= List of villages in Imo State =

This is a list of villages and settlements in Imo State, Nigeria organised by local government area (LGA) and district/area (with postal codes also given).

== By postal code ==
LGA	District / Area	Postal code	Villages
Aboh Mbaise	Amuzu	462108	Nriukwu; Umuabazu; Umubee; Umuehu; Umueni; Umugberim; Umulolo; Umuodaa; Umuogu
Aboh Mbaise	Avuru	462109	Akputu; Akuwa; Amadim; Amaim; Amaishi; Amano; Egbelu; Egwutu; Eziala; Ndi Orji; Ndigbo; Ndiukwu; Ode-Na-Ocham; Okwuta; Ozuzu; Ugwuala; Umoshi; Umuaghara; Umuananmu; Umuaru; Umudinka; Umudiriha; Umuebii; Umueke Ugo; Umueze; Umuguojii; Umuhtte; Umuime; Umuocham; Umuogakwu; Umuogale; Umuoraobara; Umuorobala
Aboh Mbaise	Enyio-Gugu	462106	Abiri-na-Owashie; Akwete; Amaetiti; Amangwu; Amoji; Awagu; Ejealolo; Eziala; Ibeku; Lagwa; Ndokwu; Okwuaku; Osi-Na-Ashia; Osina; Ugwuanya; Uloakwo; Umu Nwefor; Umuchoko; Umuckoko; Umueleme; Umueme; Umuezaku; Umueze; Umugba; Umulogho; Umuloke; Umumeka; Umunwaozani; Umuokele; Umuokpo; Umuokwe; Umuolu; Umuonu; Umuoshie
Aboh Mbaise	Lorji	462107	Ezi Amata; Eziala; Umu Gana; Umu Osike
Aboh Mbaise	Mbutu	462105	Amaku; Amoda; Amorji; Egbelubi; Ehere Ukwu; Ihitte Ocha; Obo; Obokwu; Onwuka-Na-Ukpabi; Oreetit; Umuagbara; Umuaham; Umuaku; Umualo; Umubadiloke; Umudaogbor; Umudim; Umuekwene; Umuezee; Umuezele; Umuezeorji; Umugbuakpaka; Umunocha; Umunune; Umuobee; Umuochiedu; Umuogwurukwu; Umuoshielo; Umusiehe; Umusuto; Umuzu
Aboh Mbaise	Nguru Ahiato	462103	Ezialakohu; Ngali; Obokwu; Ofeama; Ogbe; Okori; Uba; Umuaghara; Umuezie; Umuoda
Aboh Mbaise	Nguru Nwankwo	462104	Eziala Ogwu; Obeana; Obetiti; Ogbor; Ogwu Okwu
Aboh Mbaise	Nguru-Nweke	462101	Aboh; Amohuru; Egberede; Eziala; Ezuhu; Nguru Nweke; Okwu; Umaumadi
Aboh Mbaise	Okwuato	462102	Aja-Na-Agwu; Akabor; Duru Ibekuta; Ebee-Umukabi; Egbelu; Egberekatua; Ezido; Ezuhu; Ihuala; Ihumadi-Umuagwu-; Kwukwa; Ngaragu; Obo; Oborji/Obriji Ukwu; Okinkwa; Okwula; Okwuta-Umuabazu; Omuabazu; Umouguge; Umoukere; Umuba; Umubazu-Eziama; Umumechi-Umukabi; Umunaga; Umunoke; Umunokwu-Amato; Umuobazu; Umuofuga; Umuogwugwo-; Umuojii; Umuokoro; Umuokwu; Umuoshi; Umuosi; Umuwaril-Umabazu
Ahiazu Mbaise	Akabor	463119	Akanu; Azuahia; Ehizaobide; Eveulukwu-Obitti; Ibikiri; Ihieama; Lemeadem-Umuapu; Llile-Mgbuisii; Nguma; Nkarahu; Obitto-Rubber-Est; Oburugo; Odiribo; Ogburu; Ozoma-Ukwu-Umuap; Umagbukiga-Etioha; Umuadu; Umuagu; Umuagwo; Umuagwu-Mgbusoii; Umuakamuche; Umuaku-Etiho; Umuayaka; Umuba; Umubowu; Umuchaka-Ndi-Obu; Umuchine; Umuchokonagu; Umudako-Umuagho; Umuduko Umuagwo; Umudum; Umuebizi; Umuekwonye; Umuezenwora; Umuezuta; Umuhaja; Umuheja; Umukene; Umunwauba-Efioha-Efioha; Umuodu-Ono-Umuapu; Umuofo; Umuogbuanua; Umuoji; Umuokochi-Umuapu; Umuonu-Mgbisii; Umuosu-Mgbisii; Waterside-Settlement
Ahiazu Mbaise	Ekwereazu Town	463113	Abacheka; Abaezi; Aliocha; Amachi; Ariam; Dimara; Ekpe-Ekugba; Ekpe-Etekwuru; Ekpe-Mbara; Ekpe-Obokofia; Ekpe-Oforole; Ekpe-Umuoji; Ekpe-Umuudike; Ekugha; Elua; Etekwuru; Isiugbo; Iyioka; Mgbara; Mmahu; Nkpataku; Obiakkpu; Obibi; Obigbo; Obizi; Obokofia; Obom-Ukw; Oborottu; Oforla; Ojiukwu; Opuoma; Ose-Abacheke; Ose-Mmahu; Ose-Orji; Ubaba; Ubomukwu; Ugada; Ukwugbe; Umuodike; Umuowku; Unuojo
Ahiazu Mbaise	Ihitte Aforukwu	463122	Ogbor; Umuchieze; Umueze; Umunumo
Ahiazu Mbaise	Lude/Nnarambia	463111	Amakofia; Amankpu; Amaobu Settlement; Amaudara; Amekpaka; Ezoama; Lude-Awa; Ndi-Ikwuebe; Ndiako; Ndionwundele; Obeakuma; Obeama; Okwojo; Okwudo; Orsu; Settlement; Ugbele; Umakpuruedere; Umuakpa; Umuezeala; Umuezeneugwu; Umukaghara; Umukpo; Umuloghocha; Umunachi; Umuofeke; Umuofo-Na-Obai; Umuoji; Umuokoro; Umuokwu; Umuole; Umuomi; Umuoriaku; Umuro; Umurutugbu; Umuwaja
Ahiazu Mbaise	Mpam	463120	Nnemere; Okpankume; Umuaju; Umuegwu; Umuohia
Ahiazu Mbaise	Obodoahiara	463112	Mgbala; Obudi; Uba; Umuakwali; Umuobolaugwu; Umuotunwahi
Ahiazu Mbaise	Obodo-Ujichi	463117	Igburu-Awara; Ikwerrede; Oshia-Awarra; Umuagbalu; Umudimocho; Umudulu; Umugakwu; Umuigwe
Ahiazu Mbaise	Obohia	463114	Adapalm-Settlement; Afor-Amafor; Alke; Amafor-Obokwu; Amaiyi; Elekenowasi; Eziama; Eziobojwe; Ihumuonuma; Obibi; Obnogwu; Obokwu-Amafor; Obora; Olhabele-Ohoba; Umuagwu; Umuedo; Umuerim; Umugologo; Umuhuocha; Umukpo; Umukpoche; Umuodu; Umuokem; Umuome; Umuoroma-Obosima
Ahiazu Mbaise	Ogbe	463110	Ogbe Nneishii; Okeawa; Umuaghara; Umuoma
Ahiazu Mbaise	Ogwuama/Amuzi	463118	Abakuru; Amakohia; Amaokwu-Makohia; Izuoha; Ogwuamahati; Oriekpa; Umuage; Umuaku; Mgbirichi; Umunnanwe; Umuochankwo; Umuodu; Umuofor; Umuokazi; Umuokisi; Umuokoro; Umuowasi; Uzuuba-Mgbirichi
Ahiazu Mbaise	Oparanadim	463121	Oparanadim-Nweke; Oparanadim-Nwafor; Oparanadim-Nwoko
Ahiazu Mbaise	Oru Ahiara	463109	Abodinoso; Afor-Oru; Ebisike-Igwe; Eket-Idi-Ido; Nnalane-Okorocha; Owainjoko; Umpara; Umuajunwa; Umualaji Umuber-Leche; Umualaji-Iwe; Umucheikuku; Umuidi; Umudike; Umuele Na-Ezealawa; Umuenuyi-Na-Ehiocha; Umuieoaku; Umukeli; Umulolo-ogbe; Umunrom-Ororocha; Umuokorobo; Umuokwulehe; Umuoparawuadu-Idi; Umuosi; Umurogu
Ahiazu Mbaise	Otulu/Aguneze	463116	Aguneze; Itu-Aguneze; Orduga; Umuakwake; Umuobogwo; Umuochoke-Aguneze; Umuokpoke; Umuokuzu; Umuoloo; Umuzeri-Aguneze; Otulu;- Umuokoro; Ihitte; Umuagwu; Umuoke; Umuorise; Umuoyaa; Umuakam; Umugaa
Ahiazu Mbaise	Umuokrika	463115	Okrika-Nwankwo; Okrika-Nweke; Akpim; Umuevu; Umuagbavu; Umuezuo; Umugama; Umugwa; Umuikwo; Umuobodo
Ehime Mbano	Agbaja	472109	Abosi; Dinka; Mgbam; Umuchakwe; Umuechele; Umueke; Umuemeke; Umuimo; Umuobia; Umuofa
Ehime Mbano	Ehime	472101	Ehime
Ehime Mbano	Nsu	472104	Agbagbara; Ezeoke; Ihitte; Ikpe; Umuakagu; Umuanunu; Umudur; Umuezeala I; Umuezeala II; Umunohu; Umuopale
Ehime Mbano	Nzerem/Ikpem	472111	Ikwe I; Ikwe II; Mpam-Ikpem; Njoke-Nzerem; Nnegbe-Ikpem; Nocha-Nzerem; Umuagum-Nzerem; Umueleala I; Umueleala II; Umueleke-Ikpem; Umuobodo; Umuoha-Nzerem; Umuolimokoro-Nzerem; Umuolo-Ikpem; Umuosu-Nzerem
Ehime Mbano	Umualumaku/Umuihim	472108	Umudibia; Umuihim; Umuonyia; Umuoparalum
Ehime Mbano	Umueze I	472103	Umualuwaka; Umuanigo; Umuawuchi; Umuihim; Umunanom; Umuodu
Ehime Mbano	Umueze II	472102	Umueleke; Umuike; Umuodara; Umuokwe
Ehime Mbano	Umuezeala	472105	Umuopara; Umuezeala Ama; Umuezeala Ogwara; Ezike/Umunagbala
Ehime Mbano	Umukabai	472110	Ngboroko; Odoli; Umaizi; Umualuwoke; Umuchoko; Umuduru; Umueze; Umuezeala; Umunkwa; Umunwanekwu; Umuodu; Umuowere
Ehime Mbano	Umunakanu	472106	Amazi; Ofeokwe; Okpaziza; Umuele; Umueli; Umuerim; Umugolo; Umuja; Umuola
Ehime Mbano	Umunumo	472107	Eze/Obom; Offor-Ama; Ofo-Owerre; Umuamunu; Umuchima; Umuduruokoro; Umuerir; Umunghala; Umuofeke; Umuogwara; Umuwoshe
Ezinihitte	Akpodim	462112	Akpokwu; Amukwu Okoromiri; Amukwu-Okpulor
Ezinihitte	Amaumara	462111	Abu; Isiama; Ndem; Obibo; Okeohia; Okpanku; Okwuta; Otutu
Ezinihitte	Azuzuahia-Eziudo	462114	Amakam; Ezeakam-Umuhunaez; Ezikpi-Egberemiri; Umuakan-Umuagu; Umuekwerede-Ekwenenaelochi; Umuhu-Egberemiri; Umuzu
Ezinihitte	Ife	462116	Nri; Umuoshi
Ezinihitte	Itu	462110	Achi; Afor/Ocham; Akurubi-Akuru; Anaga; Ekwele; Isu; Ndem; Odo; Oria; Umuagu (Agu O); Umuakuru; Umuezea (Ezea O)
Ezinihitte	Obizi	462122	(Umuawam); (Umueluma); Amaudi; Azuahia; Obokwu; Umuire; Umuosisi
Ezinihitte	Okpofe	462113	(Umuafeze); Chukwuoma; Okpula; Okwu; Okwuaba; Umudinta; Umugadi; Umuime; Umuke; Umuocha; Umuoforikpo
Ezinihitte	Onicha	462123	Eziama; Omukwu; Ubolukam; Umuagbala; Umuekekwene; Umueleagwua; Umuevu; Umuhu; Umuoma
Ezinihitte	Owagia Eziudo	462115	Amakam; Ezibu; Ikenga; Umuchekua; Umuegwu; Umuezeaku; Umuhunaezikpo; Umulolo; Umunebia
Ezinihitte	Udo	462124	Uhuala; Umunorde; Umuofo
Ideato North	Akokwa	475107	Akwu; Owerre-Akokwa; Umuazeaga; Umuokegwu; Umuokwara; Umuopia
Ideato North	Isiokpo	475106	Isieke; Okpoko
Ideato North	Akpulu	475105	Ubaha; Okwu; Umuishim; Okpoko
Ideato North	Obodo-Ukwu	475104	Ugbelle; Umuagbo; Umueme; Umunkwukwa; Umunwarahu; Uzubi
Ideato North	Osina	475102	Durunogbu; Eluama; Ofe-Eke; Uhuala
Ideato North	Umua Laoma	475108	Alaike; Obinaohia; Obinuhu; Umuikpa
Ideato North	Uralla	475101	Amaokwu; Ezemazi; Ozoakoli; Ozu; Umuturu
Ideato North	Uzil	475103	Abiakanawaegbo; Ezihe; Umudiesie; Umuonuoha
Ideato South	Amnator	475111	Ogboza; Umuelee; Umueze; Umunobo
Ideato South	Awa-Izuogu	475118	Ikpeze; Ndiadimoha; Ndiakeme; Ndiakunwanta; Ndiamazu; Ndianichie; Ndianyakie; Ndiawa; Ndiegbuonyeoma; Ndiejezie; Ndimoko; Ndionuoha; Ndiukwu
Ideato South	Dikenafai	475122	Ndiabo/Umuabor; Okohia/Ndikpa; Okuahu/Umuabe; Umuchoke; Umudike; Umueju; Umufai
Ideato South	Isiekenesi	475121	Awalla; Isieke; Okhia; Umuaghobe; Umudim; Umuojisi
Ideato South	Ndiuche Izuogu	475120	Agochia; Amakoham; Amorji; Bianko; Irogbelu; Ndiemenike; Ndiume; Obinikpa; Okoro-Abicha; Okoro-Obumukpabia; Okorobi
Ideato South	Ntueke	475110	Durihuaukwa; Onere; Umuakuoma; Umuchinekwe; Umuduruehughara; Umuduruiakam; Umuokwaradim
Ideato South	Ubiohia	475105	Agballa; Umudunaku; Umueze; Umunkpu
Ideato South	Ugbelle	475113	Umuakuku; Umudurichi; Umuemumere; Umueze; Umuleke; Umuokwaraodu; Umuonyiri; Umuoriaku
Ideato South	Umuakam/Umuago	475110	Ndiokwara; Okorobi; Uhuaka-Okorobi; Umuchunioha; Umueze; Umuohuoba; Umuokwaramire; Umuokwaraozoka
Ideato South	Umuchima	475111	Obinugwu; Okoroduruaku; Uhala; Umudurnwaneri; Umuduruonara; Umuefe; Umuiokwaranke; Umuokwaraku
Ideato South	Umueshi	475109	Umunaga; Umunanwoke
Ideato South	Umunna-Isiaku	475112	Akeyi Isiaku; Isiogwugwu; Umuebgbu; Umueme; Umuire; Umulebe
Ideato South	Umuobom	475108	Abukwa; Akanu; Amnagwu; Imenweato
Ihitte-Uboma	Abuke	472119	Abekenta; Ibe; Ndibinaihu; Umuchie; Umudibia; Umudikengwu; Umudikeorji; Umuegwele; Umuezeala; Umuoparaodu
Ihitte-Uboma	Amainyi	472121	Amokwe/Amorji; Omulo; Opara Amainyi; Umuebeta; Umunahihie; Umuode
Ihitte-Uboma	Amakoha	472112	Amuzu; Ipinweke; Nnacheru; Umuahia; Umuokoroezuka; Umuonyeche; Umuoye
Ihitte-Uboma	Ato-Werem	472116	Elugwu; Omuchienta; Umuezea; Umuezina; Umulemaku; Umuopi
Ihitte-Uboma	Awuchi-Numo	472122	Amaikpa; Ummudaku; Umuamara; Umuduebo; Umuebonu; Umunumu; Umuokpoko; Umuore I; Umuori II
Ihitte-Uboma	Ezimba	472123	Umuduroma; Umuduru; Umueze; Umukoku
Ihitte-Uboma	Ikper-Ejere	472117	Umuanyaku; Umudwu; Umuehie; Umuejere; Umuezealaduzu; Umuopara-Owerre
Ihitte-Uboma	Onicha-Uboma	472124	Ehienahi; Umuakpa; Umudiim; Umuezeke; Umuopara; Umuchioma;
Ihitte-Uboma	Umue-Zegwu	472113	Umuakpi; Umudibia; Umule/Umuhere; Umuode; Umuokparaka
Ihitte-Uboma	Umuihi	472118	Dikenachieze; Emekengwe; Ikenafo; Uhegbu; Uhuanwuse; Umudiaba; Umuezeokwa; Umuikpu; Umunachiala; Umunne; Umuode; Umuorisa; Umuosocha
Ihitte-Uboma	Umuoma	472120	Alaocha; Eluama; Ndiehuhu-Alaocha; Ukwuobu; Umuakugba; Umudinagu; Umuijerekwe; Umunwaokafor
Ikeduru	Akabo/Amatta	461102	Abazu; Obinnekel; Umuezekom; Umuiyi; Umuiyi-Ukwa; Umuohia
Ikeduru	Amaimo	461111	Amaohiara; Amuzu; Egbelu; Obodo; Umueze; Umuofor; Umuri
Ikeduru	Amakohia	461107	Amaoba; Amaochari; Ofo-Obodo; Ogwu; Umualumagwa; Umuaririogu; Umuduruoma; Umuechem; Umuelum; Umuezizi; Umugana; Umukebo; Umuobasi; Umuoleru; Umuonunka; Uzoiyi
Ikeduru	Atta	461103	Agu; Amaano; Amaeke; Amambaa; Amauba; Atta; Attaukwu; Awo/Ohii; Ntu; Ogada; Okwara-Na-Ezeala; Olulo/Dimagu; Umuafa; Umuchi; Umudim; Umueze; Umuhu; Umuhu-Ukwu; Umulolo; Umuoku; Umuonuocha
Ikeduru	Avuvu	461113	Amachara; Amato; Amaudara; Obama; Owalla; Umushievule
Ikeduru	Eziama-Ikeduru	461108	Amachi; Amambara; Ogada; Owuzo; Umuagwu; Umuchime; Umuigwe; Umuopa
Ikeduru	Ihuo-Dimeze	461110	Amaeke; Amanunu; Okpuala; Umuakpim; Umuawom; Umuokoro; Umuori; Umusi
Ikeduru	Inyishi	461105	Amaeke; Oziri; Umuoti; Umuoziri
Ikeduru	Ngogu/Ikembara	461106	Amasa; Ekuem; Ndi-Okwu; Ochicha; Oke-Ikpo; Udor/Ochani; Umuabali; Umuahunanya; Umuaruke; Umuzor
Ikeduru	Ugri-Ike/Okwu	461112	Akwuli; Ndioji; Oba; Ofikoche; Ogada; Umuamadi; Umuchime; Umuduruebo; Umuezem; Umumgeke; Umumkpehi; Umunnohu; Umuochem; Umuodom; Umushihie
Ikeduru	Umudim	461104	Dimodu; Duruagwu; Duruejeme; Durueneriji; Duruyeome; Kwagide/Duruebo; Ndama; Ndiokwu; Oparaire; Oree/Oyime; Uhualaowere; Umuduruonyeoma
Ikeduru	Uzoagba	461109	Abo; Amambar; Obokwe; Umuagwu; Umualumaku; Umuehichie; Umuelumaku; Umueme; Umueze; Umueziogwu; Umunkpeyi; Umuomii
Isiala Mbano	Amaraku	471108	Orori; Umuelo; Umukaram; Umuobasi; Umuosu
Isiala Mbano	Amauzari	471107	Amanki so; Amuzor Owerre; Ekwe; Okwile; Okwosu; Umuagwu; Umuchukwu; Umudim; Umuecheri; Umueze Chokocho; Umuezeduru/; Umumpelle; Umunurno
Isiala Mbano	Anara	471105	Aguna; Anara; Dialum; Durunaezike; Idem; Station; Umudo (formerly Umuagwu); Umuehie; Umuneke; Umuoluwa
Isiala Mbano	Ibeme	471113	Agwumaeze; Alaude; Amaoji; Oduagwu Na Ireze; Okoroukwu Nodu; Umuoduma; Umuokii; Umuoko; Umuopurum; Umutu
Isiala Mbano	Nneto Nwaefor	471103	Ezike Ikpa-Ezike; Obinohuru; Okpeko-Obinohuru; Ugwuala; Ukulu; Umuata; Umuekwara; Umuezeala-Afor-Ezike; Umuikuku-Obinuhuru; Umukala Obinohuru; Umumahia-Obinohuru; Umumkpu; Umunankwo-Ezika
Isiala Mbano	Obollo	471109	Alaiyi-Owerre; Alaiyiama'Umuanu; Umuche; Umucheze; Umuikiti; Umukam; Umuoroma; Umuoso; Umuozuama
Isiala Mbano	Ogbor	471111	Umuagwu; Umuakobia; Umuduruagwu; Umuebinwele; Umuelem; Umunuaku
Isiala Mbano	Oka	471114	Ndiama; Ndibinuhu; Ndikpa; Ndiowerre; Okpala; Umudike; Umuduru-Ire; Umuezeala; Umunoha
Isiala Mbano	Osu-Ama	471104	Abaeke; Amaise; Ewuru; Ezi-Eze; Okeri; Okpuala-Umunachi; Umuduru; Umuduru-; Umuduruimo; Umuezeala; Umuezeala-Nyanke; Umulolo; Umunachi-Diewem; Umuogwai; Umuokoro; Umuokpara; Umuolu
Isiala Mbano	Osu-Owerre	471102	Amaolom; Naeze; Druire; Eziukwu; Mbara; Obinetiti; Obinetiti Okohia; Odiekiti; Ofeiyi; Opara-Na-Duru-Umuafala; Umuafo; Umuagwu-ukwu; Umuahighi II; Umualighi I; Umuama; Umuama-Umunchi; Umuarusi; Umubo; Umudike; Umudum-Ogwara; Umudurchie; Umuduruele; Umuelemai I; Umueze; Umueze-Abighehie; Umuezeala Okoro; Umuezeala Umunchi; Umuezeala-Oforikpa; Umuezealagwu; Umuezemaire; Umuezike; Umuguma; Umuhim-Okonia-Umulolo; Umukaku Okohia; Umukuju; Umunnum-Okohia; Umunwaoha; Umunwekwe; Umunwiji; Umuogam; Umuogugala; Umuogwaeku; Umuokwaegede; Umuokwaraobi; Umuolu; Umuomagwu; Umuorike; Umuram-Umanchi; Umuzoho
Isiala Mbano	Uguri	471112	Amemeka-Umuebie; Awam; Obinatiti-Umuneke; Oparadim-Umuobie; Udubu-Umuopala; Umuele Ujino; Umueneke-Town; Umuezefeke; Umunaku; Umuopara Agwu
Isiala Mbano	Umuduru	471101	Ebeokimma-Dibia; Egbe-Owerre; Isiebu; Ukwuakwu; Umuagwunta; Umuagwuukwu; Umuchioma; Umudur; Umuduru-Orji; Umuduru/Nneji; Umueboise; Umuegbe; Umueke; Umuelema; Umuezeala; Umuezeala-Egbema; Umuichie; Umuluwe-Ajirija; Umunwebo; Umuodu; Umuogwuma-Umunwaebo
Isiala Mbano	Umunkwo	471110	Ezunenyi; Ndiowere; Nneato; Umuago; Umuduruebika; Umuizi; Umuonyi; Umuozuga
Isiala Mbano	Umuosu	471106	Amagwu; Anuma; Chokendau; Dike-Ntako; Dunmoeji; Duruesiketu-Okorokwu; Duruofor Duruolume; Duruofor-Ntako; Emeramnwume; Ezeale-Okorokwu; Ezedim; Iheoma Okorokwu; Ihimduru; Ihu; Odummchi-Duru-Oluwe; Okorokwu; Okpamnne-Duru-Oluewe; Okpamnne-Duru-Oluwe; Oluwe; Omuoma-Okorokwu; Oparaichukwu-Duru; Ukwunyi-Duru; Umulolu-Ahia
Isu	Amandugba	474120	Aman-Dugba; Duriobi-Umualoma; Durueghuruo-Umualoma; Ndiaba; Ndiuhu-Umuduru; Umudike-Okporo; Umudishi; Umuduruoho; Umuelem; Umueye; Umuezealachukwu; Umuihoma-Umunama; Umununo; Umunwoke - Umuarisi; Umuogwu; Umuona
Isu	Amurie-Amanze	474122	Amaeze; Diojiaku; Diokhara; Dioloka; Dioma; Duraji; Durunaoma; Dururaku; Ekilite; Ezisu; Imenyi; Ndiuhu-Uloasa; Nnerim; Obiato; Okporofo; Umuchegba; Umudieke; Umudinre; Umuduruihoma; Umulolo; Umunwankwu; Umunwisi; Umuokwaradum
Isu	Ekwe	474121	Amunike; Ebenano; Ebenato; EKWE; Eluama; Eziekwe; Ibeama; Ibenwa; Nduhu; Obara; Odoicheku; Umudibi; Umudim; Umuduru; Umuduru-Ehie; Umuduru-Ewufu; Umuogra; Umuoko Rokoro; Umuokwara
Isu	Isu-Njaba	474125	Amagbara-Ezealaire; Amato; Araku; Dimnwanze; Duruaku; Duruaku-Umukpoko; Duruiheneku; Eluokporo; Ezeduru-Okwara; Ihite; Ihokporo; Mbaraonu-Nkwo; Ndinbara; Ndiuhu; Nkahu; Nnato; Nzeneri; Okwara-Nam; Uba; Umorji; Umuchima; Umudim; Umuduru II; Umuezealaibe; Umunwamiri; Umuokwara; Umuokwaraku
Isu	Umundugba	474119	Duruaro-Okporo; Durunjaba-Okoro; Umuchoko; Umudigo; Umudike; Umudim; Umudioma-Ezisu; Umuduoma-Nnerim; Umuduru; Umuezeala; Umuezeala-Ezisu; Umuezeala-Nnerim; Umuezealaji-Ororo; Umumkwo; Umunwodo; Umuokebele; Umuokwara; Umuokwara-Dim; Umuokwara-Oha
Mbaitoli	Afara	461121	Akatta; Amakpu; Amaocha; Ihitte; Obibiokwu; Umuahiaami; Umuezike; Umuokwe
Mbaitoli	Eziama Obiato	461118	Obaba; Obuoka; Ogwa; Otura-Amaigbo; Otura-Ukwu; Umuduruafor; Umuekpu; Umuele; Umufere
Mbaitoli	Ifakala	461114	Amafor; Nkwesi; Nwaorieubi; Uba/Amazu; Umuagwuoche; Umutaku/Umungwo
Mbaitoli	Mbieri	461115	Achi; Amaike; Amankuta; Amaulu; Awo; Azioha; Ebon; Obazu; Obilubi; Obokwe; Ohohia; Ubakwu; Ummomumu; Umuagwu; Umuahii; Umuchoke; Umudagu; Umuduru; Umunjam; Umuobom; Umuodu; Umuonyali
Mbaitoli	Ogbaku	461117	Amaegbu; Eziome-Ogbaku; Ishokpa-Obibi; Lawa-Ogbaku; Ohobo; Okpuala; Umuabagwo-Obibi; Umuaku; Umuawaka-Okwu; Umudogu; Umueze; Umugama-Ogbaku; Umuokpu; Umuyazi-Nsokpo; Uzele
Mbaitoli	Ogwa	461122	Abazu; Amaeke; Amankwo; Ekereazu Ogwa; Idem-Ogwa; Idem-Ukwu I & II; Idune; Igweocha; Ihihe Ogwa; Ndiuhu; Oburo; Ochii; Oluokwu; Umuanu; Umuarisi; Umueze; Umueze-Alakpa; Umuezealaeze; Uru; Uymuegbu Ogwu
Mbaitoli	Orodo	461120	Ahaba; Amaku; Amaukwu; Eziama; Odumaa; Ofekata; Okwu; Ubaha; Umuonyahu
Mbaitoli	Ubomiri	461116	Ahana; Amaubulu; Egbeada; Obokpu; Ohuba; Ohum; Umuabali; Umuocha; Umuojinnka
Mbaitoli	Umunoha	461119	Emeabiam; Isieke; Umudu; Umudurundom; Umukanama; Umumbala; Umuokparafor; Umuokparaoma
Ngor Okpala	Agala	460132	Egbelu; Emeke
Ngor Okpala	Amala/Alulu/Oburu	460128	Alatia; Alulu; Elugwu; Ikem; Imekeze; Obokwe; Umuabali; Umuaghara; Umuagwu; Umuaka; Umuakamerim; Umuarii; Umuelemii; Umuemadiukwu; Umuezumezu; Umuims; Umuisu; Umujala; Umuke; Umunebo; Umuokebi; Umuoshi; Umuotu; Umuwadi
Ngor Okpala	Egbelu/Obube	460131	Mgwoma; Ugakwoche; Umuchoko; Umugaa; Umuokpaa
Ngor Okpala	Elelem	460127	Umuagbara; Umuakiri; Umuechem; Umuiche; Umuoka
Ngor Okpala	Eziama	460126	Egbelubi-Amata; Umuagwu; Umualum; Umuchekwu-Amato; Umuchie; Umuebi; Umuegirige; Umulu; Umuogba; Umuopeke
Ngor Okpala	Ngor/Ihite/Umu	460118	& Umuevo; Ameke; Amuke; Obokwu; Ozara Umukabia; Umuafor; Umuagbom; Umuakali; Umualum; Umuanyika; Umueke; Umuekperechi; Umujioche; Umukabia; Umuochere; Umuodu; Umuogwugwu; Umuohie Ngor; Umuohu; Umuokoche; Uram Ngor
Ngor Okpala	Ntu	460120	Okpala; Umuaku; Umuhita; Umuocham; Umuogba; Umuogbor; Umuokpor; Umuolokochie; Umuoru; Uvuru
Ngor Okpala	Obiangwu/Logara	460133	Awogwu; Eziala; Eziama; Ngali; Obohia; Umuegemolu; Umuekwune; Umuena; Umueze; Umunchi; Umuoghor; Umuokeola; Umuolulu; Umuopara; Umuoronma; Umuwa
Ngor Okpala	Obib-Ezena	460130	Amaeze; Amaorie; Emeke; Eziobo; Ogbeke; Okolochi; Umuikea
Ngor Okpala	Obike	460125	Okpala; Ugwana; Umuagwu; Umubachi; Umudu; Umugakwo; Umugo; Umukabia; Umumahi; Umuoda; Umuogbe; Umuohite
Ngor Okpala	Ohekelem/Nnorie	460119	Amaedo; Amandara; Amankwu; Egbelu; Mbutu; Mgbuala; Nnabiada; Nnorie; Oda; Ota/Ikaa; Umuahia; Umuakaeshe; Umuarum; Umudim; Umuechem; Umueze; Umuhu; Umunobo; Umuohii; Umuonyike
Ngor Okpala	Ozuzu	460129	Ekwoke; Eti Oha; Obu; Okechibachi; Okeketa; Opehi; Ovakali; Owu; Umu Ekwune; Umuagwu; Umuanyim; Umuapu; Umucheze; Umuchoko; Umuejechi; Umuejim; Umuevo; Umuezeakali; Umuezom; Umuikoro; Umuimeka; Umunachi; Umunakwo; Umunama; Umuodam; Umuokweke; Uramobo
Njaba	Amucha	474127	Aguwa; Duriaku; Duroboaku; Duruewuru; Duruigwe; Ebeasaa; Ebeise; Eziene; Umuduruoka; Umunudo; Umunzu; Umuokpoko; Umuokwara; Umuoma; Umuorji; Umuzikeabum
Njaba	Atta	474128	Egwedu; Eziuba; Isiekwe; Ohima; Ubokoro; Ubudom; Ugbele; Umuerim; Umumanu; Umunam; Umuoke
Njaba	Okwudor	474124	Abazu; Umuawi; Umudirogha; Umuelem; Umuneke; Umuofeke; Umuokwara; Umuseke
Njaba	Umuaka	474123	Achara; Amafor; Amainyi; Amakor; Ibele; Isiozi; Obeakpu; Ogbele; Uba; Umuele
Nkwerre	Amaok-Para	471118	Aboh; Umuagali; Umuegbe; Umujisi; Umulo; Umuokwaranyido; Umuonyenwere; Unudei; Uzii-na Ofeafor
Nkwerre	Eziama-Obaire	471117	Amano; Amise
Nkwerre	Nkwerre	471115	Amaigbo; Nnanano; Nnanato; Obinocha; Obinuhu; Onusa; Ugwunagbor; Umugara; Unmuko
Nkwerre	Owerre-Nkw-Orji	471116	Amaegbu; Ezeoha; Ishiowerre; Oforie; Okorokparaocha; Uhusieke; Umuibu; Umuoke; Umuoma
Nkwerre	Umun-Wala	471119	Agboala; Amaorji; Ekiti; Ndimbara; Ofeiye; Ugwaula; Umuchoke; Umudirimo; Umuduru; Umudurunwaner-o; Umueluweren; Umuezeala; Umunnuhu; Umuokwaraurmu; Umuozu
Nwangele	Abajah	471125	Aladoro; Amadi; Duruiheeko; Ebikpe; Eziosuala; Nkwonyikwu; Odenaguma; Odu; Okwenafa; Umuarawode; Umubenelu; Umudim; Umuduru; Umuduruafo; Umuduruehe; Umuduruire; Umuduruokoro; Umuezeala; Umuezealaeke; Umuezealaihu; Umuezealaofor; Umugwudu; Umuike; Umunabala; Umuocha; Umuohe; Umuokwara; Umuokwaran-Yanwu; Umuokwem; Umuome; Umuonyimo; Umuozuo
Nwangele	Abba	471121	Amukwe; Mbara; Okwaradimnasu; Okwaradum; Okwesi; Orinaosa; Oteke; Umudim; Umuduruagwu; Umuezealaibe; Umuonuma; Umuotukwu; Umuozuliri;
Nwangele	Amaigbo	471124	Abali/Anyam; Eluowere; Ezealaopi; Ezeobolo; Nduhu; Obodo; Ofeahia; Otunna; Umuagwoke; Umuakwaraofo; Umuanya; Umuba/Umudurule; Umuda; Umudike; Umudim; Umudumagu; Umudurji; Umuduru-Oha; Umuduruagrishi; Umudurueze; Umudurugwonu; Umuduruigwe; Umudurumba; Umuduruobi; Umuduruobiaku; Umueze; Umuezealanwoke; Umukabia; Umukwaraoha; Umuleke; Umuode-Umuanu; Umuokwaramadu; Umuruofo; Umuwobube
Nwangele	Isu	471122	Abbo; Amuziii; Umualaoke Umurlu; Umudiweugo; Umudurioke-Umueze-Umuorlu; Umuezeala; Umuezealaofor; Umuezealarioha-Umugada; Umunabala; Umunnakara; Umuobasi; Umuopara; Umuoparadim; Umuoparaiheoma; Umuora; Umuosbasi
Nwangele	Umuozu	471123	Ekifiafor; Umuchoke; Umudurhie/Dureze; Umuokwuome
Obowu	Alike-Obowu	463105	Mgboma; Ngali; Owugha-Ohumala; Umuchienwanyi; Umuekwuele; Umukpa-Ohumala; Umukpa-Uhu
Obowu	Amuzi-Obowu	463106	Ndiokwu; Ndiuhu; Umuezigwe; Umulowu; Umuosinta
Obowu	Avutu	463103	Amaeke; Umuada; Umuagagba; Umueshi; Umuifem Umuodinma; Dikenta;
Obowu	Ikwuato	463107	Ndichule; Ndiuhu; Odenkume; Okwuohia; Umuagwu; Umuezealu; Umukwu; Umuosochie
Obowu	Okena-Logha	463101	Ehume Umunachi
Obowu	Umuariam/Achara	463104	Amagu; Nnachioma; Umuasonye; Umuegele; Umunnebi; Umuokoro
Obowu	Umungwa	463108	Amanze; Umungwa
Oguta	Awa	464106	Abiaziam; Akabor; Awa; Ejemekwuru
Oguta	Egbuoma	464105	Amagu; Egbu; Ebenamo; Ndigwe; Odode; Okwubarameh; Omadi; Ubahudara; Ugwurugwuala; Umezeala; Umuojinta; Umuadije; Umuamara; Umuereke; Umubwachuwkwu; Umuezeike; Umuezeikegbu; Umuiheala; Umuohuwo; Umuomirima
Oguta	Egwe	464103	Amamputu; Eziama; Ihite-Egwu; Imo; Umuchi
Oguta	Eziorsu	464108	Umudarakerekpu; Umundankike
Oguta	Izombe	464110	Amakofia; Ammaudara; Amnkpu; Ezoama; Ndi-Awa; Ndi-Ikwuegbu; Ndiako; Ndionwundele; Okwojo; Okwudo; Orsu; Ugbele; Umakpuruedere; Umuakpa; Umukaghara; Umuoji; Umuokwu; Umuole
Oguta	Mgbelle	464107	Ndeabiara; Uba; Umuobinihu; Umuudiaba
Oguta	Nkwesi	464109	Abodinoso; Umudei; Umudike; Umukeli
Oguta	Nnebu-Kwu	464104	Nnebukwu
Oguta	Orsu-Obodo	464102	Igbugankwo; Kalabari-Beach; Mgbabachi; Orsu-Obodo; Umu-akpu; Umu-dei; Umu-eze-aja; Umu-Ifumaezeami-Okiri; Umu-Isoma; Umu-Mbeogeri; Umu-Nnama; Umu-Nwokediukor; Umu-Obike; Umu-Ogbugo; Umu-Omeji; Umu-Onwuka; Umu-Opo; Umu-Udara
Ohaji Egbema	Assa/Obile	464115	Awoma; Idigele; Umugama; Umuikwo; Umuobodo; Umuosu; Uzoara/Mgbirichi
Ohaji Egbema	Awara/Ikweraede	464117	Igburu -Awara; Ikwerrede; Oshia-Awarra
Ohaji Egbema	Egbema	464113	Abaccheka; Abaezi; Aliocha; Ekpe -Oforole; Ekpe -Umudike; Ekpe -Umuoji; Ekpe-Ekugba; Ekpe-Etekwuru; Ekpe-Mbara; Ekpe-Obokofia; Ekugba; Elua; Etekwuru; Isiugbo; Iyika; Mgbara; Mmahu; Nkpataku; Nwaro; Obiakpu; Obibi; Obigbo; Obizi; Obokofia; Obom-Uku; Oborottu; Oforola; Ojiukwu; Opuoma; Ose Abacheke; Ose Orji; Ose-Mmahu; Ubaba; Ubomukwu; Ugada; Ukwugbe; Umuodike; Utu
Ohaji Egbema	Mgbirichi	464118	Abakuru; Amakohia; Amaokwu-Makohia; Umuaro; Uzuuba
Ohaji Egbema	Nwari-Agwa	464111	Obeama; Umuakpu; Umukpo; Umuofeke; Umuomi
Ohaji Egbema	Obudi-Agwa	464112	Mgbala; Obudi; Uba
Ohaji Egbema	Ohoba	464114	Adapalm-settlement; Afor-Amafor; Alake; Amafor-Obokwu; Eziama; Eziobojwe; Ihumuonuma; Obnogwu; Obobi; Obokwu-Amafor; Obora; Ohabele-Ohoba; Umuagwu; Umuerim; Umugologo; Umukpo; Umukpoche; Umuodu; Umuokem; Umuome; Umuoroma-Obosima
Ohaji Egbema	Umuapu	464119	Akanu; Azuahia; Ehizaobide; Eveulukwu-Obitti; Ibikiri; Ihieama; Illile-Mgbuisii; Lemeadem-Umuapu; Nguma; Nkarahu; Obitto-Rubber-Est; Oburugo; Odiribo; Ogburu; Ozoma-Ukwu-Umuap; Umagbukiga-Etioha; Umuadu; Umuagu; Umuagwo; Umuagwu-Megbuosii; Umuaku-Etiho; Umuba; Umubowu; Umuchime; Umudako-Umuagho; Umuduko Umuagwo; Umudum; Umuezenworaa; Umuezuta; Umuhaja; Umuheja; Umukene; Umunwauba-Efioha-Effioha; Umuodu-Ono Umuapu; Umuogbuanua - Umuagwo; Umuokochi - Umuapu; Umuonu - Magbisii; Umuosu -Mgbissi; Waterside-Settlement
Ohaji Egbema	Umuo-Kanne	464116	Orduga; Umuobogwo; Umuokpoke; Umuokuzu; Umuoloo
Okigwe	Amuro	470103	Amuro; Aro-Amuro
Okigwe	Ihube	470105	Agbala; Akpugo; Amagu; Amalator; Amano; Ogube
Okigwe	Okigwe (Rural)	470101	Aro-Okigwe; Aro-Ubaha; Ope; Ubahaa; Umuka; Umuokpara
Okigwe	Otan-Chara	470106	Alaike-Ogwaku; Alaocha-Igwaku; Ihitte; Ihitte-Isiokwe; Ikenga; Ikenga-Isiokwe
Okigwe	Otanzu	470102	Amaeze-Ogii; Umuawa-Ogee; Unualumoke
Okigwe	Umulolo	470104	Agbobu; Agbuala; Aku (Ihitte); Aku (Ikenga); Amano; Amaosu; Amasator; Aro-Agbobu; Aro-Umulol (West); Aro-Umulolo (East); Ibinta; Ndi-Oji; Ndi-Okoroji; Okanachi; Umuawa-Ibu
Onuimo	Okwe	470108	Ezelu; Eziama; Ezoama; Owerre; Umucheke
Onuimo	Okwelle	470109	Alaike; Ofeahia; Oji ama; Oji-Owerre; Okoronkwu; Umoma; Umuagwo; Umudufuebo; Umudumoodu; Umuegwala; Umueze-Owerre; Umuoko; Umuokwara; Umuoram
Onuimo	Umuduru	470110	Aboh; Umuduru; Ofahia; Ofeabia; Okohia; Umuanumeze; Umuokpara-Bobo; Umuokparaiye
Onuimo	Umuna	470107	Diakuma; Nzifoke; Uhi
Orlu	Amaifeke	473103	Ajafulem; Amadim; Ihunachi; Okoroemenje; Oleme; Uja; Umucheke; Umudaza; Umuegbe/Umuezihe; Umueze; Umuobom; Umuofeke; Unudu; Unulolo; Unuola
Orlu	Amaike	473108	Eshime; Umudimodu; Umudimoha; Umuduruelem; Umuduruewuru; Umueze; Umuokwaraebike; Umutukutu
Orlu	Eziachi	473118	Amano; Amato; Umuduruaku; Umuoba
Orlu	Ihioma/Ebenese	473104	Ebenese; Ikwubali; Umuezenachi
Orlu	Ihitte-Owerre	473124	Aboh; Amanator; Obinugwu
Orlu	Mgbee	473112	Ozara; Umosshie; Umudara; Umuokwara
Orlu	Obibi-Ochasi	473117	Amihe; Uhuala; Umudim; Umuede; Umuezike; Umuiheanji; Umuomedi
Orlu	Ogberuru	473106	Eluguwutokpi; Umuadu; Umuawule; Umunume
Orlu	Okporo	473110	Ubaha; Abara-Durueze; Akwakuma; Umuechem; Umudaraezike; Umudim-Na-Dara; Umudim-Na-; Umuekee; Umuebele; Umuocham
Orlu	Orlu (Rural)	473101	Aboh; Aluama; Ndiowerre; Umuafor; Umudiatu; Umudihe; Umuelelke; Umuire; Umundule; Umuokwara
Orlu	Owerre-Ebeiri	473102	E/Uama; Ezeakaeke; Ndimbara; Ndiokwu; Okworji; Onyioha; Umuduru; Umueze; Umuokwara; Umuokwu; Umuorekpu
Orlu	Umudioka	473120	Aboh; Owerre; Umudim; Umudiokaukua
Orlu	Umuna	473107	Amoji; Ebenato; Umuokware-ikuku; Umusasa
Orlu	Umuowa	473119	Ejemewune Umubu; Odielieku Ujah; Okwaraebike; Okwu; Okwuekititi-Umubu; Uhu-Umuba; Umudaduru; Umudilee; Umudim; Umuezikegwu-Ujah; Umuezukwe; Umuogu
Orlu	Umutanze	473111	Chioke; Obinator-Obor; Okwuafor; Uba-Na-Okpara; Ubaha-Owerri; Umualum; Umudara; Umunkwu-Umudim
Orlu	Umuzike	473109	Umuegbe; Umuezeoma; Umuezurike; Umulolo; Umunkwu; Umuogini; Umuokew; Umuokwaraji
Orsu	Amaruru/Ebenasaa	473123	Umuadu; Amaokwe; Elugwutokpi; Elugwu; Umuawula; Umunume; Umungozi; Ihuoma; Umuogueri; Umughadinanwa
Orsu	Assa Ubirielem	473116	Akpiobu; Elugwu-Umuhu; Elugwu-umuoka; Isi-Assah; Okuabasisi; Uhuala-Umuoka; Umucheke; Umuidi
Orsu	Awo-Idemili	473114	Abahb; Amadim; Amaimo; Amaokew; Edenta; Edeukwu; Ezeogwu; Isieke; Obhukabia; Obibi; Ubahaeze-Awo; Ubahaezeleke; Ubahaezike
Orsu	Ebenator	473113	Amaebu; Amaebu Nkwo; Amaranetu; Amazu
Orsu	Eziawa	473115	Akama-Ubaha; Amakpara; Urualla
Orsu	Ihitte-Nansa	473122	Akama; Amaokpara; Chekenagu; Nansa; Ogum; Ogwugwu-Eyi; Uhuala; Umudiaba; Umudim
Orsu	Orsu Ihite-Ukwu	473121	Amihia; Etiti; Iheteukwu; Okwu; Uda
Orsu	Umuhu-Okabia	473105	Amaimo; Ofeahia; Ofeke; Okwu; Uhuala; Umuerem; Umunabochi
Oru East	Akatta	474116	Akwa; Etim; Ibah; Ichina Amaka; Ulahangwu-Nakporo; Ura
Oru East	Akuma/Amagu	474118	Abamba Akuma; Ezi Akuma; Ezioha Amagu; Ihitte-Akum; Ihitte-Amagu; Ulabia-Akuma
Oru East	Amiri	474110	Amokpara-Amiri II; Isioorie Amiri-Isu; Nchoko-Amiri I; Nchoko-Amiri-Isu; Ugbeke-Amiri-Oru I; Umbutu-Amiri-Uru II; Umuduni-Amiri III; Umuduni-Amiri-Isu
Oru East	Eziawo 1	474111	Obibi; Ohuba; Umuokwe
Oru East	Eziawo ll	474112	Isieke; Ubaeze; Umuejike; Umuezukwe
Oru East	Ofekata ll	474114	Okwoji; Ubachima; Umubochi; Umueme
Oru East	Ofekata 1	474113	Ubogwu; Umueme; Umuezeala
Oru East	Omuma	474109	Abia-Ozuh; Umuhu-Etit
Oru West	Aji	474102	Abuga-Ezi; Akwada-Ihitte; Amiriaji-Ihitte; Ihitte; Ubahaze-Ijeja
Oru West	Amaofuo	474115	Amorie; Ebisi; Ubaha; Umuduru
Oru West	Eleh	474108	Ihitte; Umuabiahu; Umuezike; Umuoma
Oru West	Ibi Asoebe	474106	Amadaba; Ibiasoegbe; Exiama; Ubahaibi; Umuonicha; Umuorji
Oru West	Mgbidi	474101	Ezeani; Ihitte; Imeoha; Mgbidi Govt. Station; Ugbele; Umuaboah; Umuehi; Umuekwe/Okwudoe; Umuokpara; Umuorji; Uzinumu
Oru West	Nempi	474107	Ezioha; Ihitte
Oru West	Ohakpu	474105	Amafor; Eziukwu; Ikenga; Ubahudara
Oru West	Otulu	474103	Okponsu; Ubahawa; Umueji; Umuezem; Umuhu
Oru West	Ozara	474104	Aboh; Etitilabu; Ngbidi; Ubaha-lanuwon; Umuobioma; Umuogu; Umuokoporoma
Oru West	Ubulu	474117	Amadelu; Amaorie; Ezenamba; Eziama; Ubaha; Umuanyachu; Umuchukwu; Umuihejiofor; Umuoleaku; Umuonyeyile; Umuoru
Owerri North	Egbu	460105	Ishiza; Mapna; Ofeuzo; Umuayalu; Umuofor
Owerri North	Emekuku	460109	Akalovo; Awaka; Azara Owale; Azara Egbelu; Azeogba; Ezedibia; Ndi-Egbelu; Okwu-Emeke; Uboegbulu; Ubowala; Umuadu; Umuakuru; Umuocham; Umuzi
Owerri North	Emii	460111	Emeoha; Eziala; Mgbahiri; Nkepho; Ubah; Umuaawuka; Umudulu; Umuebe; Umuolu; Umuorisha
Owerri North	Ihite/Ogada/Oha	460108	Akwakuma; Amakohia; Ogoloche; Okom; Owaala; Owaelu; Umunahu
Owerri North	Naze	460112	Ezeakiri; Okpala; Umuakali; Umuezuo; Umuosu; Umurie
Owerri North	Obibi-Usratta	460104	Okwu; Umualum; Umuobaa; Umuorii
Owerri North	Orji	460103	Umegowerem; Umekehi; Umuazuonye; Umuchoke-Umuahuh; Umuegii; Umuimeke; Umundula; Umuodu
Owerri West	Avu/Umuguma	460106	Obokwu; Ogubuosisi; Umuadu; Umuehieta; Umunkwo; Umunwanyi; Umuobia; Umuome
Owerri West	Ihiagwa	460114	Ibuzor; Iriamugo; Mbokwe; Nkaramuche; Umuchima; Umuehum; Umuezeanula; Umuokwo
Owerri West	Nekede	460113	Umualum; Umudibia; Umuoma
Owerri West	Obinze	460115	32 Artillery Bgd; Umuagam; Umuanunu; Umuebo-Obokwu; Umuezereoche; Umunenje; Umuokuru
Owerri West	Oforola	460117	Amaku; Amaoji; Oboagwu; Umuadu; Umuagubiam; Umueke; Umuezuko; Umuimeka; Umuogide
Owerri West	Okolochi/Eziobodo	460116	Emeabiam; Eziobodo; Okolochi
Owerri West	Okuku (Obogwu)	460107	Mgbolo; Obogwu; Uborji; Umuapu
Owerri West	Umunwoha	460102	Amakohia Ubi; Irete; Ndegwu; Ohii; Orogwe

== By electoral ward ==
Below is a list of polling units, including villages and schools, organised by electoral ward.

LGA	Ward	Polling Unit Name
Aboh Mbaise	Enyiogugu	Aladinma Umuelem Hall; Okwuaku Hall; Umunkwo Village Hall; Ibeku Hall; Community School Eziala; Eziala Hall; Community School Umugaragu; Umuafor Village Hall; Umueziukwu Village Hall; Orie Umueze Hall; Community School Oboama; Ama-Iyala Hall; Village Square (Opp. Block Rosary Hall); Anokam Hall; Community School Egbelu; Umuoye Hall; Central School Egbelu Umuhu
Aboh Mbaise	Nguru-Ahiato	Community School Umuezii I; Community School Umuezii II; Community School Obibi I; Community School Obibi II; Town School Umuanuma I; Town School Umuanuma II; Central School Nguru; Community School Eziala Na Umuoda I; Community School Eziala Na Umuoda II; Community School Umuanuma; Community School Eziala; Community School Nguru
Aboh Mbaise	Nguru-Nwenkwo	Umuoma-Umualaeke Hall; Umuchieze Hall I; Umuchieze Hall II; Umubochi Hall; Community School Umuopara; Onugotu Hall; Obokwe Hall; Umudiawa Hall; Okpuruawa Hall; Umulolo Village Square; Community School Ogbor; Ogwu Okwu Primary School
Aboh Mbaise	Nguru-Nweke	Community School, Amaohuru; Ukaonu Ugaa Hall; Umuezeama Hall; Chokoneze Hall; Group School Ezuhu; Town School Umuamaechi; Community School Egberede; Community School Eziala; Community School Okwu Nguru; Awo Block Rosary Square; Amako Hall; Ukwuegbu Square; Umungoma Hall
Aboh Mbaise	Mbutu	Isiala Hall; Community School, Ekenguru; Awaka Hall; Amawo Town Hall; Community School, Mbutu; Ozara Village Hall; Central School, Mbutu; Ubahi Village Square I; Ogbor Village Square; Town School, Mbutu; Ihitte Oha Village Hall; Group School, Mbutu; Umueze Town Hall; Egbelubi Village Square; Obokwu Village Square; Ubahi Village Square II; Umudim Village Square; Mgbaraoji Village Square
Aboh Mbaise	Uvuru 1	Akpotu Hall; Community School Egbelu; Amaisii Amano Hall; Umuaghara Hall; Community School Okwunakuwa; Umuorobara Hall; Eziala Amaisii Amano Hall; Umunobi Umuoshi Village Hall; Umuoshi Village Hall; Community School Ndigbo; Umumbie Hall
Aboh Mbaise	Uvuru II	Umuokehie Hall; Umudinka Hall I; Umudinka Hall II; Umuachalu Hall I; Umuachalu Hall II; Community School Umuokehie; Town School Ogbor; Central School Ogbor I; Central School Ogbor II
Aboh Mbaise	Lorji	Community School Lorji I; Community School Lorji II; Community School Lorji III; Central School Lorji I; Central School Lorji II; Central School Lorji III
Aboh Mbaise	Lagwa	Group School Lagwa; Obo Town Hall; Central School Okwuato; Amaubeagba Hall; Umuabazu Town Hall; Umunoke Town Hall; Okwuato Town Hall
Ahiazu Mbaise	Otulu/Aguneze	Umuagu Hall Otulu; Ihitte Hall; Community School Otulu; Umuoyaa Hall; Otulu Sec. School; Umuakam Otulu Unity Hall; Group School Otulu; Umuirem Hall; Umuakpore Ukwu Aguneze; Umuoke Hall Otulu; Community School Aguneze; Otulu Civic Centre I; Otulu Civic Centre II
Ahiazu Mbaise	Oru-Na-Lude	Community School Oru I; Community School Oru II; Town School Oru; Akpakanwandu Hall; Umuogologoh Hall; Umudimugwe Hall; Umukpo Hall Lude; Community School Lude I; Community School Lude II; Ahiazu Sec. School
Ahiazu Mbaise	Nnarambia	Community School Nnarambia I; Community School Nnarambia II; Ahiara Tech. Sec. School I; Ahiara Tech. Sec. School II; Umuofor Hall I; Umuofor Hall II; Umunagere Hall; Ahiara Tech. Sec. School
Ahiazu Mbaise	Okirika Nwenkwo	Umuagbavu Town Hall I; Civic Hall Umezuo; Old St. Patricks; Okirika Ama Hall I; Okirika Ama Hall II; Group School Umuokirika; Umugwa Village Hall; Town School Umuokirika; Okwu Owere Hall; Umuagbavu Town Hall II
Ahiazu Mbaise	Amuzi/Ihenworie	Ahiarama/Umuakalor Court; Umush/Umasfimaniokpu Hall; Umuelu/Umuokoro Town School I; Umuelu/Umuokoro Town School II; Umuakali/Umubbi/Ugwu Hall; Umuigwe/Umuduru Hall; Primary School Obodoujuchi; Umudiwukwaku Hall; Group School Akabor I; Group School Akabor II; Group School Akabor III; Central School Ogwama; Ogwama Civic Centre; Central School Amuzi I; Central School Amuzi II; Eke Amuzi Market Square; Community School Amuzi; Mmagbuabighama Hall; Umuodu Hall
Ahiazu Mbaise	Okirika Nweke	Umudurueze Hall; Umuakam Square I; Umudurueze Square; Community Sch. Okirika Nweke I; Community School Akpim I; Community School Akpim II; Community School Okirika Nweke II; Community School Akpim III; Umuakam Square II; Community School Okirika Nweke III
Ahiazu Mbaise	Obohia/Ekwereazu	Umuduruji Hall; Group School Eloken-Owara; Town School Obohia; Ndi Owerre Hall; Umuodu Mocha Hall; Community School Obohia; Obohia Sec. Tech. School; Central School Obohia; Ihitte Hall Obohia; Community School Ekwereazu Town; Afor Amadi Square; Ariam Hall Ekwerazu Town
Ahiazu Mbaise	Mpam	Community School Nwamere; Group School Okpankum; Community School Mpam I; Community School Mpam II; Umuibozim Mpam; Umuasechariaino Mbara; Nkwumugegwu Hall I; Nkwumugegwu Hall II; Orie Umuju Market Square
Ahiazu Mbaise	Oparanadim	Comm. Sch. Oparanadim Nweafor; Ihenkwo Hall; Group School Eziama; Community School Eziama I; Community School Eziama II; Ihitte Ubi Community School; Central School Eziama; Community School Opraranadim Nwenkwo I; Community School Opraranadim Nwenkwo II; Umuezerum Eziama Square
Ahiazu Mbaise	Umunumo/Umuchieze	Umunumo Hall I; Umunumo Hall II; Umuesi Hall; Umuchieze Civic Hall I; Umuchieze Civic Hall II; Community School Isiokpu; Umuokehi/Umudionu Hall; Umuobi Hall
Ahiazu Mbaise	Ogbor/Umueze	Umuoni Hall; Ugwuaku Hall I; Ugwuaku Hall II; Central School Ihitte Afor; Umukete Hall; Umudiabali Hall; Boys' Sec. School Ekwereazu
Ehime Mbano	Agbaja	Community Primary School Mgbam/Ofa I; Community Primary School Mgbam/Ofa II; Dinka/Umuimo Hall; National Primary School Umuemeke; Central School Agbaja; Community Primary School Abosi; Umuihebo Hall; Umueke Hall; Community Primary School Mgbam/Ofa; Amaise Primary School; Umuchele Owerre Hall
Ehime Mbano	Umukabia	Umuode Civic Hall; Community School Umukabia; Amano Primary Umukabia I; Amano Primary Umukabia II; Central School Umukabia; Umuodu Hall; Umuowerre Hall
Ehime Mbano	Nsu 'A' Ikpe	Girls' Sec. School Ezeoke Nsu; Ndiama Primary School; Central School Umuakagu Nsu; Town School Umuakagu Nsu; T. T. C. Nsu; Central School Umuopara Nsu; Secondary School U'Duru Nsu; U'Duru Progressive Hall; Central School Ezeoke Nsu; Ukwuachi Primary School; Umuohi Hall
Ehime Mbano	Nsu 'B' Ihitte	Comprehensive Sec. Sch. Agbaghara; Umuduruebo Ndiowerre Hall; Civic Hall U'Nuoha; Umuoka Hall; Comprehensive Secondary School, Umuanunu; Community School Umuezeala Nsu; Umuoparaehie Hall I; Umuoparaehie Hall II; Umuehie Primary School; Ndiowerre Hall
Ehime Mbano	Nzerem/Ikpem	Obollo Primary School Dioka Nzerem; Isinkwo Primary School Dioka; Central School Dioka; Umuosu Civic Hall; Central School Umuoma; Ihebinachi Primary School; Central School Ikpem; Umueleke Hall
Ehime Mbano	Umualumaku/Umuihim	Boys Secondary School Umuihim; Umudimoku Hall; Ala-Owerre Hall; Umuonyikwe Hall; Umuduruebo Hall; Umuihim-Owerre Hall; Umuihim-Oki Hall; Umuonyia Hall; Alaiyi Hall
Ehime Mbano	Umunakanu	Umuola Hall; Ukwugiri Health Centre; Umuele Civic Hall; Amazi Hall; Umudiopara Aladinma Hall; Aladinma Umudire Hall; Umuezealaihu Civic Hall; Central School Umunakanu; Umuduruofaro Civic Hall; T. T. C. Compound; Community School Umugolo
Ehime Mbano	Umunumo	Development Primary School; Union Primary School I; Union Primary School II; Primary School Alike; Ibeafor Central School Umuogwara I; Ibeafor Central School Umuogwara II; Umuchima Hall; Umuafor Primary School; Umuogbe Hall I; Umuogbe Hall II; Ukwushii Hall; Numo Primary School; Town School Umunumo; Umuezeama Civic Hall I; Umuezeama Civic Hall II; Umuomeihe Village Hall; Umuomeihe Civic Hall; Umuehie Village Hall; Central School Umuaro; Umuanuanu Civic Hall
Ehime Mbano	Umuezeala	Umuopara-Ama Hall; Community School Umuezeala-Ama; Secondary School Umuezeala-Ama; Obom Umuako Square; Umuduru Aro Square I; Umuduru Aro Square II; Ukwuegbu Umuaro Hall; Umuezeala Offor Hall; Ukwuobu Umuezeala Ogwara C/S; Umuagba/Umuoba Hall; Isi-Afor Primary School; Isi-Orie Primary School; Central School Umuezeala, Owerre; Umuebo Hall; Umuecheloma Hall; Umuba Hall; Umudim-Amaku Hall; Central School Umuopara Ogboama; Ukwuachi Square
Ehime Mbano	Umueze I	Central School Umueze I; Central School Umueze II; Umuehi Hall; Umuodu Hall; Umuarugo Hall; Umuonyia Hall; Umueze I Technical School; Umuezealaji Umuodu Square
Ehime Mbano	Umueze II/Umueleke	Umuezealaji Hall; Central School Hall; Town Hall Umunakaru; Comp. Sec. School. U'Eze II; Dikenne-Ato Hall; Umuoparaiwe Hall; Umuezealaebo Civic Hall I; Umuezealaebo Civic Hall II; Ebezenadire Hall; Umueleke-Ama Hall; Isi-Afor Primary School; Comm. School Umueleke; Nnuhaeze Hall
Ezinihitte Mbaise	Amumara	Otulu Hall; Town School Amumara; Obibi Square; Okohia Hall; Umuokpo Hall; Ubahi Hall; Central School Amaumara I; Central School Amaumara II; Okpanku Hall; Isiama N-Ndara Hall
Ezinihitte Mbaise	Itu	Town School Itu; Central School Itu; Comm. School Itu; Umuezea Hall; Nkwo Na-Okpuala Hall; Umuekwene Hall; Umunaga Hall; Umuafor Hall; Umuoria Hall; Umuisu Hall; Eluama Hall
Ezinihitte Mbaise	Okpofe / Ezeagbogu	Umuoma Hall Okpofe; Central Sch. Okpofe; Amaforeze Square Okpofe; Amato Hall I; Amato Hall II; Umuotirikpo Hall; Uke-Na-Uga Hall; Chukwuoma Hall; Comm. School Okpofe; Comm. School Eziagbogu; Comm. Sec. School; Central School I; Central School II; Umunachi Hall I; Umunachi Hall II; Umuochaku Hall
Ezinihitte Mbaise	Onicha I	Comm. School. Umuekwene I; Comm. School. Umuekwene II; Umuawada Umuchima Hall; Com. Sch. Umuawada; Umuoma Hall; Umuoma Square I; Umuoma Square II
Ezinihitte Mbaise	Onicha II	Aladinma Umulegwa; Aladinma (Umuoshi Hall); Central Sch. Ezi-East (St. Dom); Town Sch. Ubonukam; Umubo Hall; Arugwueze Hall; Umunwanyi Comm. Hall
Ezinihitte Mbaise	Onicha III	Umuhu Hall I; Umuhu Hall II; Umuevu Square I; Umuevu Square II; Umuevu Square III; Umuaghara Hall I; Umuaghara Hall II
Ezinihitte Mbaise	Onicha IV	Eziama Hall; Omukwu Hall; Omukwu Square I; Omukwu Square II
Ezinihitte Mbaise	Eziudo	Umuakam Hall; Umuagu Hall; Umuzu Square; Ezeakam Hall; Umuekwerede I; Umuekwerede II; Umuagwu Hall; Umuchekwa; Umuhu; Ezikpi Aladinma; Amakam Hall; Umunebia Hall; Umuokoro Hall; Umualim/Ikenga Hall; Umulolo Hall; Ezihu Hall; Umuezeaku Hall
Ezinihitte Mbaise	Udo-Na-Obizi	Comm. School Udo; Uhuala Udo Hall; Town School Obizi; Comm. Sch. Obokwu; Umuire Hall Obizi; Ekwerazu Hall Obizi; Amudi Hall I; Amudi Hall II; Umuosisi Obizi; Ovurukwu Obizi; Akunari Obizi
Ezinihitte Mbaise	Ihitte	Eziala Hall; Umuomaoke Hall; Obiaka Hall; Oparachi Hall; Comm. School Ihitte; Umuokwuru Hall; Umuocham Hall; Umunagbor Hall; Group School Ihitte; Amaukwu Okoromiri Square
Ezinihitte Mbaise	Oboama/Umunama	Comm. School Oboama; Otasi Square; Umuekwere Hall; Umuodoko Square; Nkwo Ogbor; Amorji Square; Oboama/Umunama; Oboama/Umunama/Umuoshi Hall
Ezinihitte Mbaise	Chokoneze/Akpodim/Ife	Central School Akpodim I; Central School Akpodim II; Umuakam Hall; Afor Akpodim Square; Umudim Ukwu Hall; Owutu Hall Ife; Town School Ife; Umuagom Hall; Umuowuru Hall; Central School Ife; Comm. School Ife; Umunaevo Hall; Nrii Hall Ife; Ofeama Hall Ife I; Ofeama Hall Ife II; Central School Uneze; Central School Chokoneze; Comm. School Chokoneze I; Comm. School Chokoneze II; Umuajala Hall Chokoneze; Nkwuuhie Square; Egbelu Okpurulo Square; Emedike Hall; Centra L School Ife; Umunwanwiri Hall
Ideato North	Akpulu	Central School III Akpulu I; Central School III Akpulu II; Central School II Akpulu; Okwu Hall; Central School I Akpulu I; Central School I Akpulu II; Ama Dom Kindred Hall; Elembakwe Square Okwu; Umuezeoke Square I; Umuezeoke Square II; Umuisim Village Hall
Ideato North	Isiokpo	Ezekpherchi Square; Duruewuzie Hall; Town Hall; Affor Community Central School; Isiokpo Town Hall; Affor Community Central School I; Affor Community Central School II; Affor Community Central School III; Affor Community Central School IV; Alabuike Village Hall; Duruewuru Village Square; Mberu Square Isiokpo
Ideato North	Umuokwara/Umuezeaga	Central School I Akokwa; Umuloloihedi Hall; Umuduruike Hall; Umuezeona I Hall; Umuezealaku Hall; Technical College Compound; Umuezeaga Hall; Central School Hall; Umuezeala Hall; Nkwerre Hall; Umuokwara Hall; Ulobi Hall; Umudimoha Hall; Umugbagosu Hall; Dim N'Okwonu Hall
Ideato North	Akwu Owerre	Amuhu Square; Umunocha Hall; Akwu Village Hall; Umunukpa Guest House; Ogboo Square; Civic Centre Owerre; Central School Owerre; Akokwa High School; Orie Owerre Akokwa; School Extension Hall
Ideato North	Umuopia/Umukegwu	Umunyeaku Hall; Emenama Hall; Umuoghuru Hall; Okwaraji Hall; Village Square; Umuoji Hall; Ekezala Hall; Umuahunanya Hall; Umuobieri Hall; Umulolo Hall; Umumeghe Hall; C/S Afor Umuopia; Umuokwaraejesi Hall; Rest House Hall
Ideato North	Ndi Iheme Arondizuogu	Iheme Pri. School Anicheuno; St. Joseph's Sch. Ikpaezwuno; National High School A2; C/S Aniche Obinetiti I; C/S Aniche Obinetiti II; St. Micheal's Sch. Akaeme-Ohiauche; C/S Akunwanta I; C/S Akunwanta II; C/S Ndiogbuonyeoma; C/S Akeme Ikpaokoli; Independence Hall Anicheuno; Iheme Mem. Sec. School; Ndi Uhuana Village Square Obinetiti; Ndi Ofeohii Village Square Obinetiti; Ndibe Izuogu Village Hall Ogbuonyeoma; Ndiakeme Town Hall Nkwo Achi; St. Philip's Pri. School Akeme; Ndi Beuche Village Hall Ogbuonyeoma; Ndiukwu Town Hall; St. Thomas Aquinas College Hall
Ideato North	Izuogu I	Community School V. Ndiawa; Ndiuche Civic Centre; Ndiadimoha Hall; Orima Village Hall; Ama-Asusu Centre; Aguochie Village Hall; Community School Ndiadimoha
Ideato North	Ndimoko	Community Sch. Ndimoko; Obi Onunkwo Hall; Ugwunoeneocha Hall; Okporenyi Village Hall I; Ofemmiri Village Square; Community School Ndimoko; Okporenyi Village Hall II
Ideato North	Obodoukwu	C/S I Obodoukwu I; C/S III Obodoukwu; Ugbelle Hall; Pri. School Umune; C/S I Obodoukwu II; Pri. School Umunkwukwa; C/S II Obodoukwu; Primary School Uzubi; Umudiomere Hall; Umuagbadagwo Hall; Community School Umunkwukwa; Umunkwukwa Village Hall; Umumejiaku Village Hall; Umuezeugo Hall; Umuoka Village Hall; Central School I Obodoukwu; Central School III Obodoukwu
Ideato North	Osina	St. Joseph's Vocational Comm. Sch., Osina; Umuotuasi Village Hall; Ikpa Hall; Ezihe Hall; Primary Sch. Uhuelefuo; Pri. Sch. Alaogidi; Primary Sch. Alaubeojukwu; Osina Town Hall; Sec. Comm. School Osina; Umuogbu Hall; Ezeogbuwe Hall
Ideato North	Uzii/Umualoma	Uzu Town Hall; Ezihe Village Hall; Comm. School II Uzii; Obinato Hall Umualaoma; Obinihu Village Hall; C/S I Uzii; Erenama Market Square; Amanato Village Square; C/S II Umualaoma; Abiaka Na Nwaegbo Square
Ideato North	Ezemazu/Ozu	Pri. School Umuturu; Umueshiahuruike Hall; Umuelearo Hall; Okorobi Hall; Alaike Hall; Umuikpa Hall; Ugwunano Hall; Umuahunihu Hall; Umunueji Hall; Eluama Village Hall; Ekeagwuru Primary School; Umuonyemara Hall
Ideato North	Ozuakoki/Umuago	Ojenanwayo Hall; Ikpanta Hall; Okwualighili Hall; Amanato Hall; Eziokwu Hall; Umuezeonyima Hall; Umuago Village Hall I; Umuago Village Hall II; Comprehensive Sec. Sch. Urualla; Okorobi Ikpa Hall; Diokpo Hall; Urualla Girls' High School; Umumeghushie Hall; St. Micheal's Primary School Urualla; Umuduru Obiaku Hall; Primary School Ozuakoli; Umuezeogwuru Hall; Okorobi Hall; Umuago Village Hall III
Ideato North	Izuogu II	Community School Ndiejezie I; Community School Ikpakaputa I; Community School Amazu-Uno; Community School Ndiejezie II; Community School Anyakee; Emenike Village Hall; Community School Ikpakaputa II
Ideato South	Amanator/Umueshi	Central Sch. Amanator; Ogboza Village Hall; Umueze Village Hall; Hill-Top Pri. Sch. Amanator; Okorobi Village Sq.; Umuanajugh Village Hall; Umuawa Village Hall; Umuokwara Village Hall; Umuezeano Village Hall; Umuduruaku Village Square; Obinugwu Village Sq.; Umuokwaraire Village Hall; County Sch. Amanator; Ikpagbara Hall Amanator
Ideato South	Dikenafai	Umudike Hall; Umuafai Hall; Umuafai Village Sq.; Nkahu Hall; Health Centre Nkahu; Umuchoke Village Sq.; Umueju Hall; Ndiabo Village Sq.; Pri. Sch. II Dikenafai
Ideato South	Isiekenesi I	Central Sch. Isieke; Umuaghobe Village Hall; Awalla Village Sq.; Umuduruagwu Hall; St. Patrick Pri. Sch. Umuaghobe; Nkwoawalla Market Sq.; Central Sch. Awalla; Ama-Ajonuma Square Awalla
Ideato South	Isiekenesi II	Umuojisi Village Hall; Umudim Village Hall; Umudim Village Sq.; Okohia Village Hall; Umuelekuba Village Sq.; Central Sch., Isieke; St. Philip's Umudim; Umuofeke Village Square
Ideato South	Ntueke	Uhualla Village Square; Elugwuomeaku K. Hall; Primary Sch. II Ntueke; Obinugwu Square; Okorobi K. Hall; Ogwume Village Hall; Umunze Village Square
Ideato South	Ugbelle	Eluama Hall I; Uhualla Village Hall I; Eluama Hall II; Uhualla Village Hall II; Uhualla Village Hall III; Ama-Obi Hall Eluama
Ideato South	Obiohia	Ama Akwarinta Vill. Square; Comm. Pri. Sch. Obiohia; Ama-Okwaraocha Town Hall; Okorokwaraure Square
Ideato South	Ogboko I	Central Sch. Ogboko; Umuduruihearukwa Hall; Ama-Agusiegbe Sq.; Afor Ogboko Sq.
Ideato South	Ogboko II	Umuezeala Hall; Ekenta Market Sq.
Ideato South	Umuakam/Umuago	Pri. Sch. Umuakam; Comm. Sch. Umuakam I; Comm. Sch. Umuakam II; Comm. Sch. Umuago; Umuago Civic Centre; Ndiohie Village Sqr. Umuago; Akamigbo Square Umuakam
Ideato South	Umuma Isiaku	Agballaisiakwu Hall; Umulewe Vill. Sq.; Amaorji Vill. Hall; Agballa Vill. Sq.; Isiogwugwu Hall; Umueme Sq.; Umuire Sq.; Akoi Open Space; Umuduruiheoma Village Hall; Amambasha Hall; Umuobasi Village Square; Umukabi Sqr.; Ama Okwaraejiofor Umuegbu; Ngoka Hall Umuire
Ideato South	Umuobom	Ikpaokwaraebo Market Sqr. I; Umuobom Town Hall; Umuju Vill. Hall; Amagu Vill. Sq.; Cent. Sch. II Umuobom; Okwaraejesu Sq.; Comm. Sch. 4, Umuobom; Ofeiyi Sq. Umueze; Onyengwu Village Sq.; Comm. Sch. III, Umuobom; Comm. Sch. Umucheke; Uhuzi Village Sq.; Comm. Sch. I, Umuobom; Town Sch. Umuobom; Umuikpa Village Sq.; Umuobasi Vill. Sq.; Ama-Azu Okwa Centre; St. Augustine's Sch. Umucheke; Umudike Village Hall; Ikpagbara Village Sq.; Obidim Village Hall; Ikpaokwaraebo Mkt. Sq. II; Okoronyele Sqr. Umueze; County Sch. Amangbodike
Ihitte/Uboma (Isinweke)	Abueke	Umuezeala Town Hall I; Umuezeala Town Hall II; Umudike Village Square I; Umudike Village Square II; Umuchie Village Hall I; Umuchie Village Hall II; Umuoparaodu Market Square; Umudibia Village Hall; Prim. Sch. Ndibinihu; Ibi Hall
Ihitte/Uboma (Isinweke)	Amakohia	Amakohia Sec. School; Umuonyeche Village Hall; Boys High School, Amuzu; Nkwo Ihitte Market Sq.; Ogboto Umuoyo; Central School, Ihitte; Ogboto Nnachievu; Isinweke Motor Park; Umuonyemereoha Hall; Umuebere Hall
Ihitte/Uboma (Isinweke)	Amainyi	Umuarugwu Vill. Hall; Umuezeigwe Village Hall; Ekeikpa Market Sq. I; Ekeikpa Market Sq. II; Pri. Sch. Amainyinta; Amainyinta Central Sch.; Umualubi Vill. Sq.; Eluokpu Square; Umuechetu Sq.; Ogboto Umutuada; Ekeamainyi Market Sq.; Umumgboghoke Hall; Community Sch., Umunahihie
Ihitte/Uboma (Isinweke)	Atonerim	Umuemee Village Hall I; Umuemee Village Hall II; Elugwu Village Sq.; Umuchienta Vill. Sq.; Umuezinna Village Hall; Ogboto Umunemeaku; Ogboto Umuezea; Ogboto Umuoka; Comm. School, Umuderim; Umuokoroafor Hall
Ihitte/Uboma (Isinweke)	Awuchinumo	Eke Umuawuchi Market Sq.; Obom Umuori Hall; Umuduruebo Hall; Umuokpoko Village Square; Umuike Vill. Square I; Umuike Vill. Square II; Umuebonu Hall; United Sch., Umunumo; Orie Umunumo Market Square; Umuoparachoke Vill. Square
Ihitte/Uboma (Isinweke)	Dimneze	Ulo Ikoro Umuezeke Hall; Eke Egbu Market Square; Umudim Civic Hall; Community School II, Dimneze; Community School I, Dimneze; Umuduruehie Village Hall; Umuehienze Hall; Umuduruoma Hall; Ukwuachi Square; Umuakunne Ikoro Hall; Umuakpa Village Hall
Ihitte/Uboma (Isinweke)	Ikperejere	Comm. School I, Ikperejere I; Comm. School I, Ikperejere II; Comm. School II, Ikperejere; Oriezeala Market Square; Isi Orie Hall; Umuduruokoroafor Hall; Afor Ukwu Market Square; Umuejere Hall; Community School, Umuoma I; Community School, Umuoma II; Umuoma Market Square I; Umuoma Market Square II; Alaocha Village Hall
Ihitte/Uboma (Isinweke)	Okata	Comm. School II, Lowa; Comm. School I, Lowa; Okata Comprehensive Sec. Sch.; Ndiuhuala Hall; Primary School, Lowa; Comm. School, Uzinomi; Central School, Uboma; Umuanu Uhuala Hall; Umuzi Hall; Umuoloshia Hall
Ihitte/Uboma (Isinweke)	Umuezegwu	Comm. School, Umuezegwu; Umumgburu Village Hall; Ukwuchi Hall; Umuakasara Hall; Umuokwo Hall; Umuegejuru Hall; Okpuruka Hall; Ehileme Hall; Umudibia Hall
Ihitte/Uboma (Isinweke)	Umuihi	Umuokoro Hall; Nwaeruru Mbakwe Sec. Sch.; Umuezeokwa Hall; Nwakpaka Hall; Umuikpu Hall; Diabanachiala Hall; Nwankita Hall; Uhuawushi Hall; Ukwuokwe Hall; Ikenafor Hall; Imekalagwu Hall
Ikeduru (Iho)	Akabo	Central Sch. Akabo; Amaogwo Vill. Hall; Amii Comm. School; Amaudara Village Hall; Umuebem Village Hall; Umunnemoche Village Hall; Community School Akabo; Ndiokwu Hall; Amukachi Village Hall; Obiudo Village Hall
Ikeduru (Iho)	Amatta	Amatta Pri. School; Amatta Sec. School I; Amatta Sec. School II; Amatta Community School
Ikeduru (Iho)	Iho	Community School, Iho; Umuawom Village Hall; Umuakpim Village Hall; Pri. School Okpuala; Amaruru Vill. Hall; Central Sch. Iho; Amaeke Village Hall; Umuisi Village Hall; Umuokoro Village Hall; Ndiowerre Hall; Umure/Umuori Village Square
Ikeduru (Iho)	Inyishi/Umudim	Central Sch. Inyishi; Comm. School Umuoziri; Amaeke Village Hall; Umuoti Village Hall; Amakpaka Village Hall; Amaoji Village Hall; Amaugo Village Hall; Ohaohia Village Hall; Umuanu Village Hall; Umuonyeukwu Hall Umudim; Durunereti Hall Umudim; Community School Umudim; Central School Umudim; Umuduruonyeoma Hall; Uhualaowerre Village Hall; Dimodu Hall Umudim; Umuduruonyeama Hall
Ikeduru (Iho)	Amaimo	Amaukwa Village Hall; Umuebo Village Hall; Comm. School, Umuri; Ndiohia Village Hall; Umumpke Village Hall; Umuwodu Village Hall; Umuri Town Hall; Ndiruru Hall; Community School; Community School Obodo; Community School Amachara; Central School Amaimo; Community School Umueze I; Umuodom Hall; Community School Umueze II; Community School Amuzu; Umuejem Hall
Ikeduru (Iho)	Avuvu	Community School Amaudara; Central School Avuvu; Nworie Market Sq.; Community School Umude; Umuehihie Village Hall; Primary School Avuvu; Amaukwa Hall; Urobe Village Hall; Umukacha Hall
Ikeduru (Iho)	Atta I	Atta Boy's Sec. School; Pri. School Ntu; Primary School Amawo; Umuohi Civic Centre I; Umudim-Agu Hall; Mpaka Centre; Umuohi Civic Centre II
Ikeduru (Iho)	Atta II	Community Pri. Sch. Umuoku; Oparanaezeala Village Hall; Community Sch. Ogada; Amambaa Village Hall; Community School Umuhu; Umuhukwu; Central Sch. Atta (A)
Ikeduru (Iho)	Ugirike / Okwu / Eziama	Ofukoche Vill. Hall Ugirike; Umuodom Vill. Hall. Ugirike; Umumgbeke Vill. Hall Umungbeke Ugirike; Owuozor Hall Okwu (Owuozor Hall Ugirike); Umuezem Vill. Hall Ugirike; Umuduruebo Vil. Hall Ugirike; Okparanyanwu Hall Okwu; Akwuli Village Hall Okwu; Community Sch. Hall Okwu; Umumkpehi Vill. Hall Okwu; Comm. Sch. Eziama; Pri. Sch. Eziama; Amaehi Hall Eziama; Umuolulo Umuopara Hall Eziama; Umuigwe Hall Eziama; Amakpaka Vil. Sq. Eziama; Umuikkpiaka/Ejemocho Hall, Okwu (Umuikkpiaka/Ejemocho Hall)
Ikeduru (Iho)	Ngugo/Ikembara	Amachara Vill. Hall; Comm. Sch. Amasa; Comm. Sch. Ochicha; Nkwongugo Market Sq.; Ekom Mission Hall; Umuezeala Vill. Hall; Alim Hall; Amaeze Hall; Odo Naochasi Hall; Community School, Ikembara; Umuabali Vill. Hall; Ndiokwu Vill. Hall
Ikeduru (Iho)	Uzoagba	Comm. Sch. Umueme; Comm. Sch. Abo-Umueme; Comm. Sch. Umuomi; Pri. Sch. Amabaa; Pri. School Ndiuhuobokwe; Pri. Sch. Umuehihie; Comm. Sch. Umueze; Comm. School Uzoagba; Pri. Sch. Umuagwu; Umuohee/Umuomi Square; Chokwa Na Arugo Hall; Umueze Umuodu Hall; Uzoagba Central Sch.; Umukocha Hall; Umu Alumaku Hall; Umudiamangba Vill. Sq.; Orieumuomi Market Sqr.; Amaudara Vill. Sq.; Umuagwu Isinkwo Vill. Sq.; Amameka/Umuodu Village Sq; Amaeke Umuehihie Village Square; Umunwanyiha/Umuaruk Vill. Square
Isiala Mbano (Umuelemai)	Amaraku	Customary Court Amaraku; Central Sch. Amaraku; Comm. Sec. School; Comm. Pri. School; Umuosu Vill. Square; Umueli Village Square; Umueli/Umuduru/Omume Hall; Umuobasi Umudimofor Hall; Umuduruebo/Umuobasi Hall; Umuezechim Hall
Isiala Mbano (Umuelemai)	Umunkwo	National Primary School; Umuduruebika Vill. Square; Umuezeopara Vill. Hall; Cent. Sch. Umunkwo; Umunkwo Town Hall; Umudurukwaku Vill. Square; Umunkwo Comm. School; Umuezealaku Village Hall; Umuduruiheoma Village
Isiala Mbano (Umuelemai)	Ogbor	Town Sch. Ogbor; Umuchukwu Vill. Square; Umuezechukwu Village Sq.; Umuoparama Vill. Square; Umuduruagwu Vill. Square; Umuokohia Vill. Hall; Umuoparaji Vill. Square; Ogbor Pri. Sch. (Okedim); Umuwari Vill. Square; Umuoyenye Vill. Square; Umuehihie Vill. Square
Isiala Mbano (Umuelemai)	Osu-Owerre I	Comm. School Mbeke; Eze-Na-Gom Square Mbeke; Cent. Sch. Okohia; Umuduruagwu Hall Okohia; Comm. School Okohia; Umunuma Village Hall Okohia; Ikpankwo Pri. Sch. Umuaro; Hill Top Pri. Sch. Umuelemai; Township School Umuelemai; Umuolu Hall Okohia; Umuali II Vill. Square Mbeke; Agwu-Na-Aku Vill. Sq. Okohia; Township Sch. Umuelemai; State Pri. Sch. Okohia; Umukaku Comm. Health Centre; Umuihim Hall Okohia
Isiala Mbano (Umuelemai)	Osu-Owerre II	Central Sch. Ezihie; Mbara Hall; Comm. Sch. Dikenaofiyi; Central Sch. Umuekebi; Central Sch. Umunchi; Umulolo Town Hall; Central School Umuaro; Aforachi Market Square; Umuarusim Vill. Hall; Umuokio Hall Umunchi
Isiala Mbano (Umuelemai)	Osuama/Anara	Central School Eziama; Comm. School Eziama; Central School Eziama Umunachi; Okpuala Pri. School; Central Sch. Umuagwu; Isiala Pri. School; Comm. School Ezumoha; Central Sch. Anara; Comm. Sec. Sch. Anara; Comm. Pri. Sch. Anara; Ohohia Vill. Sq. Anara; Umuozu Vill. Hall Ezumoha; Umuneke Anara Vill. Square; Dd/Alum Vill. Sq. Anara; Umuoluwe Village Hall
Isiala Mbano (Umuelemai)	Ugiri/Oka	Umudimeka Vill Square; Central Sch. Umuebie; Comm. Sch. Ugiri Ama; Ukwuedo Pri. Sch. (Umuneke); Central Sch. Umuopara; Comm. Sch. Umuopara; Comm. Sch. Umuneke; Umuehie Vill. Square; Oka Pri. School; Umudike Civic Hall; Comm. Sch. Okpara Oka; Ndiowerre Hall Oka; Ndikpa Hall Oka; Umuezefeke Hall; Umuezealameri Village Hall; Akpakama Hall Umuebie
Isiala Mbano (Umuelemai)	Amauzari	Okwosu Hall Amauzari; Umuagwu Hall Amauzari; Umunpele Hall Amauzari; Central Hall Amauzari; Progress Pri. School; Anauzo Village Hall; Comm. Sch. Amauzari; Umudim Vill. Hall; Okweke Vill. Hall; Town School Amauzari; Comm. Sec. School; Ekwe Pri. Sch. Amauzari; Ogbor Village Hall; Umuechdim Vill. Hall
Isiala Mbano (Umuelemai)	Obollo	Obollo Sec. Tech. Sch.; Comm. Sch. Obollo; Umudo Hall Obollo; Alaiyi Owerre Square; Central Sch. Obollo; Umukiti Village Square; Okwanta Pri. School
Isiala Mbano (Umuelemai)	Umuozu	Ofoaziri Pri. Sch.; Comm. School Umuozu; Umuozu Sec. Sch.; Umuezealaire Hall; Umuhieofo Town Hall; Umuchoko Town Hall
Isiala Mbano (Umuelemai)	Osu-Achara	Ikpafor Pri. Sch. (Umuduru); Isiegbu Town Hall; Town Sch. Umuduru; Comm. School Umuduru; Central School Umuduru; Central Sch. Umuluwe; Central Sch. Orji; Central Sch. Umuohiri; Comm. Sch. Obiohuru; Umukala Town Hall; Comm. Sch. Ezike; Umunanje Vill. Square; Umuegbe Owerre Town Hall; Umuezeala Hall Umuohiri; Umuchima Hall; Umuohii Hall
Isu (Umundugba)	Amandugba I	Umunumo Hall; Umunama Hall; Umuarusi Hall; Umeye Hall; Umuelem Hall; Umuezealachukwu; Ndiama Vill. Square; Ndikpa Amaukwuegbu Square; Umudishi Hall; Umuezenaka Vill. Square; Amaukwure Square; Community Sch. Amandugba
Isu (Umundugba)	Amandugba II	Umuduru Hall; Umuogwu Hall; U. Y. C. Hall; Umuduruoho Hall; Umuona Hall; Inland Pri. School; Amaigidi Square; Amaocha Durueke Square
Isu (Umundugba)	Umundugba I	Umuezeala Hall; Okporo Hall; Umudike Hall; Central Sch. Umundugba; Umuokebele Hall; Umunwodo Hall; Amaukwuogu Square; Ukwuegbu Square; Umuokwara Hall
Isu (Umundugba)	Umundugba II	Umudioma; Ezisu; Umudioji; Umuokwaradim; Town School Hall; Umuokwaraoha (1); Umuokwaraoha (2); Umuduru Square; Amaukwuakpaka; Umuezealaji; Umuchoko Square
Isu (Umundugba)	Amurie Omanze I	Dioloka Vill. Square; Amagadi Vill. Square; Diakuzuruahu Vill. Square; Amaikweaku Village Square; Comm. Sch. Amurie; Dieke Village Square; Diure Village Square; Duruiheoma Village Square; Okwaraegede
Isu (Umundugba)	Amurie Omanze II	Amaenyikwasara Square; Amaigidi Square; Town School Oboro; Duruobiaku Square; Okporofor Hall; Onyiriegbe Village Square; Duruanoruo Village Square
Isu (Umundugba)	Ekwe I	Umuezeofor Square; Eluoka Hall; Eluama Hall; Ibeama Square; Amaoguike Square; Umuduru Hall; Amaocha Umuomenike Square; Obara Hall; Ebenano Hall; Ukwube Square; Elugwu Hall; Obara Owerre; Ofenkoro; Obara Okwu; Amauwakwe Square
Isu (Umundugba)	Ekwe II	Union School Ekwe; Amaukwu Umuokwara Ndiuhu; Amaukwu Ozurumba; Umunjo Village Square; Comm. School Ekwe; Amaukwuokwe Ebenator; Amaukwuorji Umuokoroko; Isiobiukwu Square; Amaukwu Umuokwara Ndiokwu; Umukundu Village Hall; Amadionwuka Square; Umuduruije Hall; Amaukwuezi Eluama Square; Umudioka Umuduruewuru Square
Isu (Umundugba)	Isu-Njaba I	Okwara Village Square; Duruaku Village Square; Uzoafor Village Square; Imeowerre Village Square; Ihite Village Square; Umunwamiri Village Square; Umuezealaire Village Square; Uba Village Square; Odouhuru Square; Umuokwaraku Village Square
Isu (Umundugba)	Isu-Njaba II	Amaizara Vill. Sq. I; Amaizara Vill. Sq. II; Town Sch. Amaizar; Amauju Vill. Square I; Amauju Vill. Square II; State Pri. School I; State Pri. School II; Umuduru Village Square; Umuokpoko Village Square I; Umuokpoko Village Square II; Eluokporo Vill. Square; Nkahu Civic Centre; Umuchima Village Square
Isu (Umundugba)	Isu Njaba III	Comm. School Isunjaba; Umunkalu Hall; Ungor Village Hall; Umuduru II Vill. Square; Umunwanze Hall; Amu-Gbara Village Square; Ezealaire Village Square; Umuduruofor Square
Mbaitoli (Nwaorieubi)	Afara/Eziama	Eke Obibiokwu; Comm. Sch. Afara; Akata Village Hall; Central Sch. Afara; Holy Trinity Nursery Sch. Ihitte; Umuahiamii Village Hall; Central Sch. Eziama Obiato; Nkwokwu Pri. Sch. I; Nkwokwu Pri. Sch. II; Community Sch. Otura I; Community Sch. Otura II; Community Sch. Afara; Umuagha Vill. Square; Amaigbo Hall; Ogwa Hall
Mbaitoli (Nwaorieubi)	Umunoha/Azara	Umuduru Pri. Sch. Umunoha I; Umuduru Pri. Sch. Umunoha II; Comm. Sch. Umuokparafor; Obasamanwu I Square; Obasamanwu II Square; Community Sch. Umunoha I; Community Sch. Umunoha II; Ejimadu Hall; Umudurudom Hall; Comm. Sch. Azara I; Comm. Sch. Azara II; Umubara Hall
Mbaitoli (Nwaorieubi)	Ubomiri	Estate Children's Pri. Sch. Egbeada I; Estate Children's Pri. Sch. Egbeada II; Ahama Vill. Hall; Umueze Obokpo Hall I; Umueze Obokpo Hall II; Ojinaka Hall; Ezeakpi Umuabali Hall I; Ezeakpi Umuabali Hall II; Central Sch. Ubomiri; Comm. Pri. Sch. Ebgeada; Egbeada Junction I; Egbeada Junction II; Afor Orji Market Square I; Afor Orji Market Square II; Orieuchi Market Square; Nkwo Onyecherem Market Sq.; Amaegbu Square; Umuocha Hall Onu Well; Umunchoke Hall; Ohum Community School; Amauburu Civic Hall; Nkwonyecherem Market Square
Mbaitoli (Nwaorieubi)	Ifakala	Central Sch. Ifakala; Uba Hall; Umudurulaka Civic Centre I; Umudurulaka Civic Centre II; Amazu Village Hall; Umuagwu Hall; Umuchilewe Hall; Umuanuo Hall; Oboro Hall; Primary Sch. Ifakala; Civic Centre Owerri Ifakala; Comm. Sch. Ifakala; Umutaku Village Square; Amafor Village Square; Okwuagu/Ndiokwu Square; Durumba Village Square
Mbaitoli (Nwaorieubi)	Ogwa I	Idem Ukwu Civic Centre; Central Sch. Idem Ogwa; Comm. Sch. Umuopara Anyanwu; Comm. Sch. Oboro; Amaogwe Vill. Hall; Orie Idume Mkt. Sq.; Central Sch. Oboro Umueze; Umuelekeocha Hall; Girls' Sec. Sch. Umueze Ogwa; Comm. Pri. Sch. Abazu; Ihitte Hall; Ndiokwu Hall; Umueke Hall; Umunwachukwu Hall; Umuduruzo Hall; Eke Ama Square; Ihitte-Umueze Civic Centre
Mbaitoli (Nwaorieubi)	Ogwa II	Uloukwu Hall; Amakwu Hall; Umuezealaeze Hall; Ndiuhu Hall; Ndikpa Hall I; Ndikpa Hall II; Amaeke Hall; Comm. Cent. Sch. Alaenyi; Primary Sch. Alaenyi; Amankwo Hall; Comm. School Ekwereazu; Amaegbu Hall Square; Umuokparaku Hall; Umuezealaije Hall; Umuezeaakme Hall I; Umuezeaakme Hall II; Umuoremiri Village Hall Ochii; Okwu Hall; Comm. School Uru Na Anu; Umuanu Hall; Ogbo Meeting Vill. Square; Primary School Ochii; Uru Village Hall
Mbaitoli (Nwaorieubi)	Orodo 'A'	Comm. Sch. Okwu Orodo; Amaukwu Comm. Sch. Orodo; Umuokwa Village Hall; Duruegbuwa Hall; Umuokparaocha Hall; Okwaragi/Elo Hall; Echendu Hall; Umuomezume Hall; School For The Deaf; Comm. School Ofekata; Eke Amaku Square; Umuonyeahu Square; Amaigudu Square; Eziowere Hall; Umudim Village Hall; Umuerem Hall; Umuduru Hall; Diwodu Village Hall; Ebo Hall; Nnome Village Hall
Mbaitoli (Nwaorieubi)	Orodo 'B'	Umuokparaduru Village Square; Ukwu Udara Amorji Square; Comm. Sch. Ubaha Orodo; Umuonu Square; Umuike Square; Eziama Village Hall; Umudionu Village Hall; Mansion Primary Sch. Odumara; Duruejiaka Kindred Hall; Umumbara Kindred Hall; Eke Ubaha Market Square; Obioku Village Hall; Ndi Okwu-Eziama Hall
Mbaitoli (Nwaorieubi)	Umunwoha/Mbieri/Umuawu	Amudam Hall; Primary School Awo I; Comm. School Awo I; Comm. School Awo II; Primary School Awo II; Umuagwu Community School I; Umuagwu Community School II; Obiakobo Age Grade Hall; O. Y. A. Hall; Ohohia Community School; Community School Ebom I; Community School Ebom II
Mbaitoli (Nwaorieubi)	Amaike Mbieri	Dimorji Obokwe Hall; Umuduru Primary School; Amaike Community Sch.; Umuahii Civic Centre; Comm. Sch. Umuomumu; Okwambara Duruebika Comm. Hall; Comm. Sch. Umuobom; Comm. Sch. Ubakuru; Amankuta Comm. Civic Hall; Amankuta Community School; Eziuhu Obokwe Hall; Zion Sch. Umuomumu
Mbaitoli (Nwaorieubi)	Ezinihitie Mbieri	Umuchoke Hall I; Umuchoke Hall II; Comm. Pri. Sch. Obazu; Ama Okwe Vill. Sq.; Umueze Hall; Comm. Sec. School Mbieri; Comm. School Obazu; Umuneke Vill. Hall; Comm. School Obilubi I; Comm. School Obilubi II; Amaochasi Square; Achi Primary School; Achi Comm. Sch. Mbieri; Ezioma Comm. Sch.; Umuodu Comm. School; Ama Ugba Square; Eke Ihitte Market Sq.; Amaulu Comm. School; Umunjam Hall; Ukwu-Uko Hall; Ama Abosi Sq. Umudagu; Amaide Sq. Umuomenihu; Orie Ahia Market Sq.; Umunkwodu Vill. Square
Ngor Okpala (Umuneke)	Amala/Alulu/Oburu/Obokwe/Ntu	Umuocham Pri. Sch. Ntu; Central Sch. Umuhitte Ntu; Umuodagu Central Sch. Ntu; Ama Radio Square, Ntu; Central School Amala; Orie Orji, Ntu I; Central Sch. Obokwe; Orie Orji Ntu II; Pri. Sch. Ubachukwu Amala; Alulu Town Hall, Alulu; Central School Alulu; Umuisu Pri. School Amala; Town School Oburu; Umuewo Village Hall Amala; Umuinwere/Umuokwa Civic Hall Amala; Pri. School Obokwe; Obokwe Town Hall; Alulu Market Square; Afor Egbe Market Sq. Ntu
Ngor Okpala (Umuneke)	Elelem/Obike	Comm. School Obike; Comm. Central Sch. Elelem; Umuoka Village Square Elelem; Central Sch. Obike; Pri. Sch. Umueme Obike; Pri. Sch. Ebikoro Obike; Ochicha Sq. Obike; La-Pri. Sch. Umuechem Elelem; Comm. Cent. Sch. Elelem; Primary Sch. Okwunola Obike; Comm. Sch. Umuoyere Obike; Central Sch. Umuagii, Obike; Umuaghara Elelem Comm. Hall; Umuiche/Umuakiri Sq. Elelem; Amala Obike Vill. Sq. Obike
Ngor Okpala (Umuneke)	Ozuzu	Comm. Pri. Sch. Umuekwune; Ovuakali Vill. Sq.; Okechubachi Hall; Umuohoko Square; Comm. Sch. Umuekwune; Eke Umugo Hall; Central Sch. Umuekwune; Umuikoro Square; Secondary Sch. Orishieze; Comprehensive Sec. Sch. Umuekwune; Umuodam Square; Comm. School Obokwe I; Comm. School Obokwe II; Central Sch. Orishieze; Comm. Sch. Opehi; Afor Obokwe Market Square
Ngor Okpala (Umuneke)	Eziama/Okpala	Umuchulu Hall Okpala; Central Sch. Eziama; Dev. Pri. Sch. Eziama; Umuogba Vill. L Sq. L Eziama; Central Sch. Okpala; Egbelubi Vill. Sq. Amato Eziama; Comm. Sch. Umuohie/Umukabia Eziama; Umualum Vill. Sq. Eziama; Comm. Pri. Sch. Umuokoro Amato Eziama; Pri. School Okpala; Umuchukwu Hall Eziama; Umuchie Hall Eziama; Umulu Vill. Sq. Eziama; Umuagakwo Vill. Hall Okpala; Umubachi Vill. Hall Okpala; Umuokoro Amato Hall Eziama; Ehe-Nkirinki Hall Okpala
Ngor Okpala (Umuneke)	Imerienwe	Comm. Sch. Upe; Comm. Central Sch. Umunam; Central Sch. Umuoye I; Ukama Comm. School; Umunakara Comm. School; Comm. School Amafor; Central Sch. Umuoye II; Pri. Sch. Upe/Umunam; Umunakara Village Square; Central School Umuoye; Pioneer Pri. Sch. Amafor; Owerri Grammar Sch. Imerienwe; Comm. Pri. Sch. Umunam; Comm. School Upe
Ngor Okpala (Umuneke)	Nguru/Umuowa	Eziala Nguru Vill. Nguru; Dev. Pri. Sch. Egbelu Nguru; Comm. Sch. Umuowa I; Town School Nguru; Civic Centre Umuaga Nguru; Central School Umuowa; Comm. Sch. Umuowa II; Umuowa Vill. Hall; Umuowa Market Square; Amaibo Nguru Vill. Sq.; Comm. School Umuowa III
Ngor Okpala (Umuneke)	Ngor/Ihitte/Umukabia	Trinity Pri. Sch. Egbelu Ngor; Umuohie Vill. Sq. Ngor; Comm. Central Sch. Ngor; Umualam Vill. Sq. Ngor; Umuagbom Vill. Hall Ihitte; Ihitte Amaukwu Hall Ihitte; Comm. Central Sch. Umuakabia; Amaeke Vill. Sq. Ngor I; Amaeke Vill. Sq. Ngor II; Comm. Central Sch. Umuneke Ngor; Umuneke Village Sq. Ngor I; Umuneke Junction Sq. Ngor II; Ogwugwu Dev. Pri. Sch. Ihitte; Ama Tailor Umukabia; Umuneke Junction Market Sq., Ihitte
Ngor Okpala (Umuneke)	Ohekelem Nnorie	Umuahia Vill. Hall Ohekelem; Central School Ohekelem; Primary School Ohekelem; Central School Nnorie; Primary School Nnorie; Ekeukwu Nnorie Market Sq. I; Ekeukwu Nnorie Market Sq II; Umuedi Nnorie Hall
Ngor Okpala (Umuneke)	Obiangwu	Pri. Sch. Umueze Obiangwu; Comm. School Obiangwu; Comm. Central Sch. Obiangwu I; Comm. Central Sch. Obiangwu II; Pri. Sch. Umuene Obiangwu; Umuwa-Oma Village Hall; Comm. Sch. Umunehi; Airport Sq. Comp. Obiangwu; Pri. School Umueze; Primary Sch. Umueze
Ngor Okpala (Umuneke)	Logara/Umuohiagu	Ahiajoku Sq. Umuohiagu; Ndiuhu Umuokoada Logara Vill. Sq.; Central Sch. Umuohiagu I; Central Sch. Umuohiagu II; Ndiokwu Vill. Sq. Logara; Amaogwu Vill. Square; Umuoro Vill. Sq. Umuohiagwu; Pri. Sch. Umuorisha Umuohiagwu; Eziama Vill. Sq. Logara; Ngali Vill. Sq. Logara; Umuohiagu Town Hall; Umuchoko Junction Umuohiagu
Njaba (Nnenasa)	Atta III	Ukwualandisi/Village Hall, Ukwualandisi; Dim/Dim, Village Square; Las Egwedu; Umuejike/Umuejike, Village Hall; Ubarahiara/Central Sch. Ubarahiara; Umudara/Village Hall, Umudara; Umuoma/Village Hall, Umuoma; Umudim/Umudim, Village Hall
Njaba (Nnenasa)	Amucha I	Duruobiaku/National Sch. Amucha; Eziere/Eziere Village Hall; Ndibinama/Village Hall, Ndibinama; Ndiohia Owerre/Village Hall, Ndiohia Owerre; Umuorji/Umuorji Vil. Hall; Ndiuhu Vill. Hall; Duruaku Vill. Square
Njaba (Nnenasa)	Amucha II	Umuokwara/Cent. School Amucha; Umuzikabum/Umuzikabum Vill. Hall; Umunzu/Umunzu Vill. Hall; Umuoma/Umuoma Vill. Hall; Umuokpoko/Umuokpoko Vill. Hall; Uhuala Village Sq.; Local Authority Sch. (Las) Amucha; Okwuama Village Hall
Njaba (Nnenasa)	Nkume	Umuezeala/Umuezeala Vil. Hall; Umunekehi/Umunekehi Hall; Umueshime/Cent. Sch. Nkume; Umudara/Umudara Vill. Sq.; Umueze/Umueze Vill. Hall; Orori/Amaukwu Sq. Orori; Umuneke/Umuneke Vill. Hall; Umugba/Amaukwu Umugba Sq.; Okwunanu/Village Hall, Okwunanu; Umuduru/Village Hall Umuduru; Umuolu/Comprehensive Sec Sch. Nkume; Umuduruonyeka/Vill. Hall Umuduruonyeka; Umuakuma/Umuakuma Vil. Hall; Umuduruaku/Vill. Sq., Umuduruaku; Umuezealaku/Vill. Sq. Umuezealaku
Njaba (Nnenasa)	Okwudor	Okwudor Central Sch.; Abazu/New Abazu Vill. Hall; Umuenyimba-Ezeala/Comm. Sch. Okwudor; Okwudor State Pri. Sch.; Umuokwara/Umuokwara Vill. Hall; Umuofeke/Umuofeke Vill. Hall; Umuelem/Town Sch. Umuelem; National Sch. Okwudor; Umuewi/Umuewi Vill. Hall; Umuezeala/Umuezeala Vill Hall.; Durugbor/Amaukwu Durugbor Sq.; Abazu/Old Abazu Sq.; Umuakaje/Umuakaje Vill. Hall; Mpitakwa Square; Ndiokwu/Amaukwu Ndiokwu Sq.; Umuokwarama/Umuokwarama Vill. Hall; Comm. Sch. Okwudor; Umuokwarama Hall; Ama-Okata Square, Okwudor
Njaba (Nnenasa)	Umuaka I	Hill-Top Pri. Sch.; Umudiekweihe/Umudiekweihe Village Square; Amanwaigidi Square; Amaokwaraojiaku Square; Ndiuhu/Ama Ndiuhu Vill. Square; Achara/Premier Sch. Achara; Umuduruorji/Umuduruorji Vill. Hall; Unity Pri. School; Umudim/Ama Umudim Vill. Square; Umubani-Njaba/Umubani-Njaba Vill. Sq.; Ama Nwama/Ukwudara Ama Nwama Square; Amabiakwe/Amabiakwe Vill. Square; Amaocha Nwaji/Amaocha Nnaji Vill. Square
Njaba (Nnenasa)	Umuaka II	High School Umuaka; Riverside Pri. Sch. Umuaka; Amambakwe Square; Amaocha Ezegeihu Square; Obiato/Obiato Vill. Hall; Amaocha Irocho Sq.; Ama Ononiwu Isiozi Sq.; Ugbelle/National Sch. Ugbelle; Amaocha Achiga Sq.; Umuezeala/Amaocha Umuezeala Sq.; Amaocha Obisirike Sq.
Njaba (Nnenasa)	Umuaka III	Amakor/Pri. Sch. Amakor; Amaocha Mbiri Sq.; Umuolu/Umuolu Vil. Hall; Umuasharam/Umuasharam Prim. Sch.; State Primary School II; Umudurujiaku/Amaocha Umudurujiaku Sq.; State Pri. School I; Amaodozo Square; Umuoka/Umuoka Vill. Square; Umudiochi/Ukwudara Umudiochi Square; Obeakpu/Mgbakito Vill. Square, Obeakpu; Ndieziama/Ndieziama Ukwuedo Vill. Square
Njaba (Nnenasa)	Umuaka IV	Amaiyi/Town Sch. Amaiyi; Amaiyi/Hall Site Amaiyi; Umunkuta/Amaocha Umunkuta Square; Umudioribe/Amaocha Umudioribe Square; Amaocha Enyikwasara; Amaocha Obi Square; Ibele/Inland Sch. Ibele; Ibele/Union Pri. Sch.; Amanwubi/Amanwubi Vill. Square; Okwudor/Okwudor Vill. Hall
Nkwerre	Onusa	Umuagu Square I; Umuogbo Square; Aghazie Square; Isiawodu Hall I; Isiawodu Hall II; Ukwarasu Hall; Ogbemere Square; Umudike Square; 'U'Enereji Square; Umuagu Square II
Nkwerre	Nnanano (Nkwerre II)	Ukwube Hall I; Ukwube Hall II; Ukwuinyi Hall I; Ukwuinyi Hall II; Umunyuem Hall; Umukabia Hall; Ishiogwugwu Hall; St. Catherine Girls' Sec. Scho.; Umueze Hall; Umunaga Hall; Ezeala Square; Umuinyi Hall III
Nkwerre	Umukor (Nkwerre III)	Umudurumba Hall I; Umudurumba Hall II; Okala Square; Umudurumba Hall III; Okwaraji Square; Umuokpu Hall; Umuokpu Square; Community Sch. Nkwerre
Nkwerre	Nkwerre IV (Umunubo/Umunachi)	Obinihu Hall; Central Sch. Nkwerre; Amaegbu Square; St. Augustine's Sch. Nkwerre; Amangwu Hall; Umunachi Hall; National Sch. Nkwerre; Amaorji Hall I; Amaorji Hall II; Okoroihezie Hall; Nwahia Hall; Ndimbra Hall; Obinocha Hall
Nkwerre	Nkwerre V	Okwu Hall I; Amala Okwu Square; Okwu Hall II; Umukala Hall I; Umukalu Hall II; Ndimbra Hall; Ndimbra Square
Nkwerre	Owerre Nkworji I	Town Sch. Owerre Nkworji; Umuibu Village Hall; Umueke Village Hall; Eshibene Hall; Central Sch. Owerre Nkworji; Uhusieke Village Hall; Amaegbu Hall; Eluama Hall; Ego Hall; Umueke Hall
Nkwerre	Owerre Nkworji II	Girls' Sec. Sch. Owerre Nkworji; Oforie Village Hall; Umuoke Pri. Sch.; Ishiowerre Hall I; Ishiowerre Hall II; Umoke Pri. Sch.; Central Sch. Umuoke; Isiowerre Agbala Hall; Umumbara Hall; Agbala Hall; Umuwakwa Hall
Nkwerre	Umudi/Umuwala	Umuduruimo Hall; Agbala Hall; Umuaro Hall; Ofeiyi Hall; Umuezeala Hall I; Umuezeala Hall II; Ekiti Hall; Amaorji Hall; Umuchoke Hall; Umuelu Hall; Umunwuhu Hall; Np. Su; Okonze Hall; Ekpe Hall
Nkwerre	Amaokpara	Umulo Hall; Umunachi Hall; Umuegbe Hall; Umuokwara Hall; Uzii/Ezeala/Okwaranyi/Madueke; Abo Village Hall; Cent. Sch. Amaokpara; Umuneke; Umudei Village Hall; Nwara Hall; Aboh Hall; Umuduru Hall
Nkwerre	Eziama Obaire	Umunam Hall; Umuakuma Hall; Umuakuma Vill. Square; Umunwokwe Hall; Comm. Sch. Eziama; Cent. Sch. Eziama Obaire; Cent. Sch. Eziama; Ezemenaha Hall; Ezekwemba Hall; Sec. Sch. Eziama Obaire; Ndimbara Hall
Nwangele (Onu-Nwangele Amaigbo)	Amano/Umudurumba Ward (Amaigbo I)	Umuokpara Hall; Umudim Hall; Eluowerre Hall; Dick Tiger Mem. Sec. School; Umueze Hall; Comm. School Amaigbo; National Pri. School
Nwangele (Onu-Nwangele Amaigbo)	Umuanu Community Ward (Amaigbo II)	Umudurumba Hall I; Umudurumba Hall II; Comm. Sch. Umuanu I; Comm. Sch. Umuanu II; Obodo Hall I; Umuola Hall I; Obodo Hall II; Umuola Hall II; Comm. Sch. Umuanu
Nwangele (Onu-Nwangele Amaigbo)	Amaju Community Ward (Amaigbo III)	Town School Amaju I; Town School Amaju II; State Primary School; Umuduruaku Hall; Union Primary Sch.; Ndikpa Hall; Umuduruobiaku Hall; Umutakwu Hall; Umuobube Hall; Umunwerem Hall
Nwangele (Onu-Nwangele Amaigbo)	Amamnaisi (Amaigbo IV)	Umuduruagirisi Hall; Ndiuhu Hall; Umuagwoke Hall; Umuanya Hall; Umuezealanwoke Hall; Umuduruji Hall; Umugwuanya Hall; Umuorji Hall; Umuokwaraofor Hall
Nwangele (Onu-Nwangele Amaigbo)	Ezeobolo/Ofeahia/Duruoha/Umukabia (Amaigbo Ward V)	Ezeobolo Hall; Central Sch. Amaigbo; Ofeahia Hall; Umukabia Hall; Umuduruoha Hall I; Ezealaopi Hall; Umuduruoha Hall II
Nwangele (Onu-Nwangele Amaigbo)	Abba Ward	Town School Abba; Comm. High Sch.; Umuokam Hall; Central School Abba; Umuokpara Hall; Umuduruagwu Hall; Comm. School Abba; Oteke Hall; Ogwuaga Hall; State Primary School; Umuezealaibe Hall; Nwafor Umulolo Hall
Nwangele (Onu-Nwangele Amaigbo)	Umuozu Ward	Central School Umuozu; Umurawai Hall; Umuemeto Hall; Egbechi Hall; Comm. School Umuozu; Umuozu Civic Centre; Opposite Convent (Comprehensive Sec. School); Umuoso Hall; Okorokwara Hall; Okwuome Hall; Umuonukwuru Hall
Nwangele (Onu-Nwangele Amaigbo)	Kara-Na-Orlu	Umuezealaorioha Hall I; Comm. School Umuorlu; Umuolihi Hall; Umualoke Hall; Comm. Sch. Umunakara; Umunwazu Hall; Umuezealaorioha Hall II
Nwangele (Onu-Nwangele Amaigbo)	Dim-Na Nume	Police Sec. School (Isu Girls' High School); Umudiweugo Hall; Town School Dim-Na-Nume; Central Sch. Dim-Na-Nume; Umuezealaehihie Hall; Odugom Hall; Comm. School Umuoparadim; Duruokala Hall
Nwangele (Onu-Nwangele Amaigbo)	Abajah Ward I	Umuduruaro Hall I; Okwenafa Hall; Umuozuo Hall; Comm. Sch. Umudiagba; Umuokwaraori Hall; Umudim Hall; Umuishii; Umuokwaranyanwu Hall; Umuduru Hall; Umuezealaehie Hall; Central School Abajah; Comm. School Umuarisi; Umuduruaro Hall II
Nwangele (Onu-Nwangele Amaigbo)	Abajah Ward II	Addi Primary School; Umuocha Hall; Umuokpu Community School; Amaudara Community School; Odenaguma Hall; Umuduruire
Obowo (Otoko)	Alike	Pri. School Ikenanzizi; Okporo Obama Hall; Umuekwele Village Hall; Ulenadaka Hall; Umukpa Hall; Umuko Hall; Enerenwoke Hall I; Enerenwoke Hall II; Umunakazie Hall; Umugboghonkwo Village; Umuchienwanyi Hall I; Umuchienwanyi Hall II; Umubaji Hall; Umuadizie Hall
Obowo (Otoko)	Amanze/Umungwa	Umuakirika/Ofembara Hall I; Umuakirika/Ofembara Hall II; Pri. School Umungwa; Umuokoede Hall; Amangwu Hall; Umukabia Hall; Umumegwu Village Hall
Obowo (Otoko)	Amuzi	Umualum Vill. Hall; Umualaoma Vill. Sq.; Ekeala Pri. Sch. I; Ekeala Pri. Sch. II; Oriezigwe Pri. School; Ndiugiri Hall I; Ndiugiri Hall II; Umuomere Hall; Umunwandu Hall; Umunwada Hall; Umuochichieze Hall; Mgboji Umuicheku Hall; Umuchoko Hall; Obinetiti Hall; Uhunokwu Pri. School I; Uhunokwu Pri. School II
Obowo (Otoko)	Avutu	Mbara Umuifem Hall; Mbara Uhukwa Hall; Mbara Umuada Hall; Mbara Eke Village Square; Cent. Sch. Dikenodi; Mbara Umuoshi Vill. Sq.; Nkwo Umuagagba Hall.; Mbara Ukwu Uhie Square; Umuokpara Vill. Square; Umuokoko Amaeke Vill. Sq; Mbara Ukwuuhie; Umuololo-Amaeke Square
Obowo (Otoko)	Ehume	Mbara Ihie Village Square; Mbara Umuorieaku Vill. Sq.; Mbara Nta Sq.; Mbara Eho Square I; Mbara Eho Square II; Mbara Ukwu Village Hall; Umuewi Village Hall; Mbara Umuezeagu Vill. Square
Obowo (Otoko)	Odenkume/Umuosochie	Pri. Sch. Odenkume; Ogboto Ndi Uhu Vill. Hall; Umuezealum Village Hall; Umukwu Vill. Square; Umuagwu Vill. Square; Umuoparaocha Vill. Square; Progressive Pri. Sch. Umuosochie; Umuchieze Hall; Umuokereke Vill. Square
Obowo (Otoko)	Okenalogho	Central Sch. Umulogho I; Central Sch. Umulogho II; Umunnem Village Square; Umunze Hall; Jumunnam Hall; Umuagu Hall; Afor Umuokeh Hall; Comm. School Umuokeh; Umuosimaku Village Hall; Ogbedere Village Hall; Umuokoro Hall
Obowo (Otoko)	Okwuohia	Umuchime Hall; Umuonyeoki Hall; Akpunaokorie Hall; Agunachieze Hall; Umuntumogu Hall; Umuokorodugburu Hall; Umuokoroanuhuka Village Square; Umuohuo Hall; Umuosi Hall
Obowo (Otoko)	Umuariam/Achara	Ogbaedere Village Square I; Ogbaedere Village Square II; Umuogbede Village Hall; Uhuri Village Square; Umuariam College Hall; Amaorji Village Sq.; Mbara Uhu Ukwa Vill. Square; Umunnebi Village Sq. I; Agunadike Hall; Achara Sec. Comm. School; Umunnebi Village Sq. II; Comm. School Achara; Amaorji Nnachioma Village Hall
Obowo (Otoko)	Umunachi	Mbara Ikoro Vill. Sq. I; Mbara Ikoro Vill. Sq. II; Mbara Okpu Village Square; Mbara Umuokereke Village Square; Mbara Umunneato Vill. Square; Mbara Eho Village Square; Mbara Ugiri Village Square I; Mbara Ugiri Village Square II
Oguta (Oguta)	Egwe/Egbuoma	Pri. Sch. Egbuoma; District Office Egwe; Town Sch. Egwe; Umuezeala Pri. School; Umunwachukwu Omirima/Amala Ereke/Umuolowu; Comm. Sch. Egbuoma I; Primary Sch. Nkwoegbu; Central Sch. Egbuoma I; Town School Egwe; Comm. Sch. Egbuoma II; Central Sch. Egbuoma II
Oguta (Oguta)	Izombe	Comm. School Izombe; Pri. Sch. Amakpurueders; Izombe Mathernity; Central Sch. Izombe; Arbose Pri. School; L. A. School Izombe; Ugbelle Square; Ndionwanibe Square
Oguta (Oguta)	Mbala/Uba	Alaoma Pri. Sch. Mgbala I; Alaoma Pri. Sch. Mgbala II; Alaoma Pri. Sch. Mgbala III; United Town Sch. Mgbala I; Pri. Sch. Mgbala; Comm. Sch. Uba-Agwa I; Comm. Sch. Uba-Agwa II; United Town Sch. Mgbala II
Oguta (Oguta)	Ndeuloukwu/Umuowere	Umuowerre Square; Ndiuloukwu/Umuowerre I; Ndiuloukwu/Umuowerre II; Umunwenwe Square
Oguta (Oguta)	Obudi/Aro	Central Sch. Obudi I; Central Sch. Obudi II; Town Sch. Obudi I; Ekeokpo Market Square I; Ekeokpo Market Square II; L. A. Sch. Obudi I; L. A. Sch. Obudi II; Manpower Uzii Square I; Manpower Uzii Square II; Central Assembly Square Umushim I; Central Assembly Square Umushim II
Oguta (Oguta)	Oguta 'A'	Girls' Pri. Sch. Oguta I; Girls' Pri. Sch. Oguta II; Girls' Pri. Sch. Oguta III; Girls' Pri. Sch. Oguta IV; Central Sch. Oguta I; Central Sch. Oguta II; Central Sch. Oguta III; Central Sch. Oguta IV; Central Sch. Oguta V; Central Sch. Oguta VI; Town School Oguta I; Town School Oguta II; Town School Oguta III; Afiafor Ugada; Nomadic School Ugada I; Nomadic School Ugada II
Oguta (Oguta)	Oguta 'B'	Town School Oguta I; Town School Oguta II; Town School Oguta III; Town School Oguta IV; Town School Oguta V; Town School Oguta VI; Oguta Pavillion I; Oguta Pavillion II; Girls' High School Oguta I; Girls' High School Oguta II; Oguta Pavillion III
Oguta (Oguta)	Oru	Primary Sch. Nkwesi; Comm. Sch. Nnebukwu; Town Sch. Mgbele I; Primary Sch. Orsu Obodo I; Primary Sch. Orsu Obodo II; Primary Sch. Orsu Obodo III; Primary Sch. Orsu Obodo IV; Comm. Pri. Sch. K.-Beach; Amayi Pri. Sch. Ezi-Orsu I; Amayi Pri. Sch. Ezi Orsu II; Comm. Sch. Ezi Orsu I; Comm. Sch. Ezi Orsu II; Amayi Pri. Sch. Ezi Orsu; Play Ground Orsu-Obodo; Pri. School Orsu Obodo; Old Pri. Sch. Orsu-Obodo I; Old Pri. Sch. Orsu-Obodo II; Nnebukwu Pri. School; Town School Mgbele II; Primary School Nnebukwu
Oguta (Oguta)	Ossemotor/Enuigbo	Odekpu Hall I; Primary School Osemotor I; Primary School Osemotor II; Primary School Osemotor III; Comm. School Osemotor; Odekpu Hall II
Oguta (Oguta)	Uwaorie	Umukpo Primary School I; Umukpo Primary School II; Umukpo Primary School III; Umuomi Primary School I; Umuomi Primary School II; Umuomi Primary School III; Central Sch. Umuofeke I; Central Sch. Umuofeke II; Umukpo Market Square; Umuekpu Cent. School; Oboama Primary School I; Oboama Primary School II; Oboama Primary School III; Okeakuma Village Square; Okwupunji Market Square; Umuomara Village Square
Ohaji/Egbema (Mmahu-Egbema)	Assa/Obile	Town Sch. Assa I; Town Sch. Assa II; Central School Assa I; Central School Assa II; Afor Market Square I; Alioma Village Square; Community Sch. Obile; Umueneta Village Square; Nkwo Obile Market Square; Primary School Obile; Afor Market Square II; Assa Market Square
Ohaji/Egbema (Mmahu-Egbema)	Awara/Ikwerede	Ochia Dev. Pri. Sch., Ochia; Central Sch. Awara I; Central Sch. Awara II; Central Sch. Awara III; Awara Market Square I; Primary Sch. Awara; Town School Ikwerede; Central School Ikwerede; Central School Awara IV; Central School Awara V; Awara Market Square II; Awara Market Square III
Ohaji/Egbema (Mmahu-Egbema)	Egbema 'A'	Obeakpu Village Square/Obeakpu; Prim. Sch. Mmahu/Mmahu I; Mmahu Town Hall/Mmahu; Nkwo Mmahu Sq. / Mmahu; Pri. Sch. Mmahu/Mmahu II; Pri. Sch. Mmahu/Mmahu III; Ubomukwu Village Sq./Ubomukwu; Abaezi Primary School I; Pri. Sch. Abacheke/Abacheke I; Pri. Sch. Abacheke/Abacheke II; Egbema Hall I; Iyioka Village Sq/Iyioka; Afia Orie Square; Ekenta Market Square; Abaezi Primary School II; Egbema Hall II; Abaezi Primary School III
Ohaji/Egbema (Mmahu-Egbema)	Egbema 'B'	Pri. Sch. Obiakpu/Obiakpu I; Pri. Sch. Obiakpu/Obiakpu II; Town Sch. Obiakpu/Obiakpu I; Town Sch. Obiakpu/Obiakpu II; Ukwugba Village Square I; Ukwugba Village Square II; Elua Primary School/Elua; 'Nwari Primary School/Nwari; Aliocha Village Square; Ukwugba Village Square III
Ohaji/Egbema (Mmahu-Egbema)	Egbema 'C'	Akwaigbo Village Square/Akwaigbo; Comm. School Obokofia/Obokofia; Oboro Village Sq./Oboro; Primary Sch. Mgbara/Mgbara I; Primary Sch. Mgbara/Mgbara II; Comm. Sch. Mgbara/Mgbara I; Comm. Sch. Mgbara/Mgbara II; New Heaven Square; Egbema Secondary School
Ohaji/Egbema (Mmahu-Egbema)	Egbema 'D'	St. Peters Sch. Opuoma/Opuoma; Comm. Pri. Sch. Opuoma/Opuoma I; Comm. Pri. Sch. Opuoma/Opuoma II; Igbo Village Square/Igbo; Primary School Utu/Utu; Nigeria Starch Mill/; Primary Sch. Ngada/Ngada; Comm. Pri. Sch. Opuoma
Ohaji/Egbema (Mmahu-Egbema)	Egbema 'E'	Ekugba Plant. Primary Sch. I; Ekugba Village Square; Town School Etekwuru/Etekwuru; Umudike Village Sq./Umudike; Umudike Plant. Pri. Sch./Umudike; Etekwuru Plant. Junction/Etekwuru; Etekwuru Primary School/Etekwuru; Community Pri. Sch. Etekwuru/Etekwuru; Ekugba Plant Primary Sch. II
Ohaji/Egbema (Mmahu-Egbema)	Ekwuato	Town Sch. Umuokenne I; Town Sch. Umuokenne II; Central Sch. Umuokenne; District Field Umuokanne I; Primary Sch. Umuokenne I; Primary Sch. Umuokenne II; Union Primary Sch. Mgbirichi I; Union Primary Sch. Mgbirichi II; Community School Abakuru; Community School Mgbirichi I; Community School Mgbirichi II; Community School Mgbirichi III; Community School Mgbirichi IV; District Field Umuokanne II
Ohaji/Egbema (Mmahu-Egbema)	Obitti/Mgbishi	Town Sch. Obitti I; Orie Obitti Market, Obitti; Primary Sch. Obitti I; Primary Sch. Obitti II; Town School Obitti II; Primary Sch. Nkarahia I; Primary Sch. Nkarahia II; Central School, Mgbishi I; Town School Ilile; Town Hall Ilile; Community Sch. Umuoso; Primary School Umuos0; Umuonu Market Square; Rubber Est. Market Square Obitti; Central School Mgbishi II; Primary School Obitti III
Ohaji/Egbema (Mmahu-Egbema)	Ohoba	Nkwo Well Market Square I; Nkwo Well Market Square II; Alaka Village Sq.; Nkwo Well Market Square III; Central School Ohoba I; Central School Ohoba II; Eziama Village Sq.; Central School Umunwaku; Obogwe Village Hall I; Obogwe Village Hall II; Umunwaku Pri. School; Adapalm Primary School I; Adapalm Primary School II; Afor Obosima Market Sq.; Primary School Obosima I; Town School Obosima; Umunwaku Primary School; Primary School Obosima II; Nkwo Well Market Square IV
Ohaji/Egbema (Mmahu-Egbema)	Umuagwo	Community Pri. Sch. Etioha; Waterside Primary School; Comm. Primary Sch. Umukene I; Okeohia Village Sq.; Town School Umuagwo I; Town School Umuagwo II; Town School Umuagwo III; Central School Umuagwo I; Central School Umuagwo II; Central School Umuagwo III; Central School Umuagwo IV; Court Premises Umuelu I; Court Premises Umuelu II; Comm. Primary School, Umukene II; Town School Umuagwo IV
Ohaji/Egbema (Mmahu-Egbema)	Umuapu	Community Primary School Umuapu I; Primary School Umuapu I; Primary School Umuapu II; Community School Umuapu I; Community School Umuapu II; Community School Umuapuiii; Town School Ihie I; Town School Ihie II; Ihie Primary School; Ihie Village Square; Community Primary School Umuapu II
Okigwe (Okigwe)	Okigwe I	Umuchima Pri. School; Umurido Square; Umuegem Square; Low Cost Football Sq.; Urban Sec. School; Mechanic Vill. Square; Urban Pri. School; Ike Road Square I; Cho Genesis Square I; Low Cost Football Squareii; Ike Road Square II; Cho Genesis Square II
Okigwe (Okigwe)	Okigwe II	Umuokpara Hall I; Umuka Hall; Comm. Sch. Ikpatu; State Pri. School; Ekeagbara Market Square; Ikpaeke Square II; Garki Market Square I; Okigwe Moto Park I; Ndiawa Uwonu Pri. School; Garki Cattle Mkt. Square II; State Primary School; Garki Cattle Mrk Square III; Okigwe Moto Park II; Umuopara Hall II
Okigwe (Okigwe)	Ihube	Ihube Pri. Sch., Ogube; Ogube Village Square; Amagu Hall; Ndiobilikpa Square; Aforndu Primary School; Nkoto Square I; Amaokwe Village Square; Comm. School, Ihube; Ekeukwu Ihube Mrk. Square I; Amakpu/Akpugo Village Square; Amaikpa Agbala Vill. Square; Ekeukwu Ihube Mkt. Square II; Nkoto Square II; Ozara Village Square
Okigwe (Okigwe)	Aku	Umuanu/Ugwu Umuanu; Amalato/Umunnekwu I; Ofoisii/Obulorie; Amaorie/Umunuo/Aheiyi; Uhuala/Umunneato; Agbala/Aniti/Ofoato; Amalato/Umunnekwu II
Okigwe (Okigwe)	Ogii	Ogii Central School; Ogii Community School; Mbator Community School; Comm. School, Obilikpa; Umuoduehi Village Square
Okigwe (Okigwe)	Ezinachi	Ezinachi Central School I; Ubahu Village Square; Amaukwa Village Square; Ezinachi Primary School; Ndiohia Comm. School; Ezinachi Comm. Primary School; Amachara Village Square; Ezinachi Comm. Sec. School; Umudiaba Village Square; Ezinachi Central School II
Okigwe (Okigwe)	Umualumuoke	Umualumoke Comm. School; Umuokkpara Square; Ugwaku Comm. Primary School; Aro Ugwaku Vill. Square; Isiokwe Central School; Orre Village Square; Umuagwu Civic Hall; Umuajia Lkvillage Hall; Umuobiala Village Square; Alaohu Ndiuche Vill. Square
Okigwe (Okigwe)	Amuro	Comm. Primary School, Amuro; Eke Oha Market Square; Ogele Primary School; Amuro Ogele Square; Ofeiyi Amuro Square; Eke Ogbuonyeoma Mkt. Square; Ndiuche Aro Onuimo Comm. School; Ndianiche Obaa Hall; Nkwo Ogele Mkt. Square; T-Junction Ndiogbuonyeoma
Okigwe (Okigwe)	Ndimoko Ofeimo/Ibinta/Okanachi/Umuowa Ibu	Umuowa Ibu Central School; Mbasaa Central School; Ibinta Primary School; Ndiamazu Ikpocha Pri. School; Mbasaa Primary School; Ndimoko Ofeimo Vill. Square; Mbara Ndinwafor; Ndiokoroji Comm. School; Okorodike Village Square
Okigwe (Okigwe)	Umulolo	Girls' High School, Umulolo; Central School, Umulolo; Amosu Community School; Agbuala Primary School; Aro Umulolo Central School; Abo Umulolo Comm. School; Umuokpara Town Hall; Umulewe Village Square; Umukele Village Square
Okigwe (Okigwe)	Agbobu	Aro Agbobu Primary School; Isieke Village Square; Agbobu Sec. School; Aro Umudike Primary School; Umueze Vill. Sq.; Ibura/Umueshi Pri. School; Ikpaeze I Village Sq.; Imo Basin Primary Sch.; Ezeanaaniche/Okonkwo-Aniche/Anya/Aniche Ogbu
Onuimo (Okwe)	Umucheke	Ezihie Vill. Hall; Umudurunnahu Hall I; Umudurunnahu Hall II; Umuokpara Hall; Umuokpara Ehie Hall; Umuaebi Vill. Hall; Ukulo Village Hall; Okwogo Vill. Hall; Umuikpe Vill. Hall; Umuezeori Vill. Hall
Onuimo (Okwe)	Owerre-Okwe	Umudike Hall; Umunamu Hall; Dev. Pri. School; Nnahora Hall; Umuala Hall; Eziorie Obioma Hall; Umuoluwe Hall; Umudike Sq.; Umudike Obirikpa Sq.
Onuimo (Okwe)	Ezelu	Ezelu Pri. School; Ezimba Village Hall (Eziama Vill. Hall); Umuopi Vill. Hall; Umuode Comm. School (Dumuode Comm. School); U. D. A. Civic Centre; Umueli Vill. Hall; Umualulu Vill. Hall
Onuimo (Okwe)	Ofeahia	Umuezeala Hall; Ogbuka Hall; Comm. Sch., Umuduru; Central Sch. Umuduru; Ekenkwo Vill. Sq.; Okoroigbo Civic Centre; Amakanu Square
Onuimo (Okwe)	Aboh/Okohia	Aboh Market Square; Comm. Sec. School; Amazu Ikwu Hall; Comm. School, Okohia; Umuokwaradike Vill. Sq.; Okohia Civic Centre; Ukwu Ogbo-Ogbo Square; Ama Eleazer Sq.; Amazu Ikpakwu Square; Comm. Civic Centre
Onuimo (Okwe)	Ozimo / Umuanumeze	Orie Market Square; Umuanumeze Vill. Sq.; Comm. School Oziomo; Eke Market Sq.; Central Sch., Uwakonye; Comm. Sch. Aniche Ikpe; Ogwogo Uwakonye; Amaocha Square; Umuobi Sq.; Amaokorie Vill. Square; Central Sch. I Uwakonye; Central Sch. II Uwakonye; Egerege Square
Onuimo (Okwe)	Umuna	Umuhu Vill. Sq.; Umuna Cent. School; Okai Primary School; Diakuma Primary School; Umuibe Village Hall; Umunumu Hall; Umuna Primary School I; Umuna Primary School II; Okohia Village Square; Okigwe National School; Ihe Owerre Village Hall; Ode-Na-Ebo Village Hall; Ajabo Village Hall
Onuimo (Okwe)	Okwelle I	Dispensary Centre Okwelle; Okwelle Comm. School I; Umudurudu Hall; Okwelle Central School; Umuagwu Town School Hall; Umuezeala Umuagwo Hall; Umuoma Hall; Okwelle Comm. School II
Onuimo (Okwe)	Okwelle II	State Primary School; Okpala Hall; Okwelle Primary School; Umuoko Hall; Umuduruebo Hall; Oil Mill Hall; Alaike Hall I; Alaike Hall II
Orlu	Ohafor/Okporo/Umutanze	Afor Ala Sq.; Ocham Na Dibie Hall; Okporo Civic Centre; Umuokpara Hall; Central Sch. III Okporo; Health Centre Okwu Ududu; Ubaha Sq. Okporo; Okporo Town School; Amanator Sq. I; Amanator Sq. II; Ubaha Sq. (Umutanze); Okwafor Hall; Obor Square; Afor Ala Square II
Orlu	Ohaeke/Okporo	Eke Abara Sq.; Ubaha Abara Sq.; Ama Iduna Oba; Ozurumba Sq.; Cent. School I Okporo; Umuezeoma Hall; Obi Ukwu Umuduru I; Ama Egbebu Hall I (Okwu); Ama Egbebu Hall II (Okwu); Amaga Hall; Obi Ukwu Umuduru II
Orlu	Ebenese/Umueze/Nnachi Ihioma	C. P. S. Okwuekpe I; Onuogwugwu Sq.; Ubaha Hall I; Ubaha Hall II; Cent. School Ihioma; Ibuzor Hall; Orie Ugiri Mkt. Sq.; Uhuala Hall; Dibie Na Nneme I Pa Hall; Umuagii Village Sq.; Ogbeke/Umuebele Sq.; C. P. S. Okwuekpe II
Orlu	Okwua Bala/Ihioma	Cent. Sch. Okwuabala I; Cent. Sch. Okwuabala II; Umuezikeodu Hall Ndida; Mudim Hall Obinugwu; Amaudeagha Hall I; Amaudeagha Hall II; Amaegbu Hall Umudim; Obinugwu Village Sq.; For Ndida Hall; Obinugwu Hall; Ama Udeagu Hall
Orlu	Umudioka	Dimamoke Sq.; Umuzi Okwaranwaedo Sq.; Umudoka Town Hall; Umudoka Sec. School; Umudimaku Square; Prim. Sch. Ow. Umudioka I; Prim. Sch. Ow. Umudioka II; Eluama Square; Progress Prim. Sch. Umudioka; Okwaranwanedo; Umuawaka Square
Orlu	Ihite Owerre	Aboh Pri. School; Comp. Sec. Sch. Ihiteowerre; Ama Onyejesi Sq.; Comm. Pri. Sch. Aboh Ndida; Unity Prim. Sch. Aboh Ndida; Amaokwu Sq. Aboh; Comm. Pri. Sch. Amanator; Umuagu Hall Amanator; Oduma Square Amanator; Nkwo Amanator Mkt. Square; Comm. Prim. Sch. Obinugwu I; Comm. Prim. Sch. Obinugwu II; Afor Africa Mkt. Sq.
Orlu	Amaifeke	Ofor Ogidi Hall; Umudu Hall I; Amanano Sq.; Oleme Hall; Amaukwu Okoroemeje; Ofeke Square; Ofeke Hall; Umudara Hall; Umucheke Square; Umucheke Vill. Hall; Umueze Square; Ihunnachi Village Hall; Ujar Na Obom Hall; Umuofeke Hall; Umuezeokwu Hall; Amadim Hall; Umudu Hall II
Orlu	Umuzike/Umuowa	Umuokwe Hall; Umuogir Square; Pri. Sch. Umuzuike; Umuegbe Hall; Umuokwaraji Square; Central Sch. Umuowa; Ama Ezike Nwawuihe Sq.; Ejemekwuru Square; Town School Ujah; Comm. School Umuowa; Umudaduru Hall; Umuezukwe Hall; Umudim Hall; Umuogu Village Square; Umuojinma Village Square
Orlu	Owerri Ebeiri	Premier Prim. Sch. Owerri Ebeiri I; Ndiokwu Square; Eluama Square I; Okworji Square; Umuegbe Square; Umuokekpu Square; Ndimbara Village Square; Premier Prim. Sch. Owerri Ebeiri II; Eluama Square II
Orlu	Eziachi/Amike	Umuduruaku Square I; Umuduruaku Square II; Umuorji Hall; Amaukwu Okorogwu Square; Central School Eziachi; Umunanta Hall; Umunoba Hall; Umunoba Square; Umuneze Square; Umuneze Comm. Sec. School; Premier Prim. Sch. Umuanumeze; Umudimoha Hall
Orlu	Ogberuru/Obibi	Umuezeala Square; Cent. Sch. Ogberuru; Eziama Hall; Aboh Square; St. Patrick School; Umunam Square; Umuamuji Square; Obibi Pri. School; Umuiheanyi Square; Onyeweliwe Hall; Umuezike Amadara Square I; Uhuala Square; St. Maria Goretti School; Umuazala Hall; Umuezike Ama Udara Square II
Orlu	Orlu/Mgbee/Orlu Govt. Station	Eluama Square; Umudiatu Square; Girls' Sec. Sch. Orlu; Umuafor Square; Umueleke Square; Umudihe Square; Umuire Square; Kumuokwara Town Hall; Nepa Area Orlu; Township School Orlu; Umudara Hall; Ozara Square; Umuokwara Village Hall; Comm. Prim. School Mgbee; P. E. I. School Campus II
Orsu (Awo Idemili)	Umuhu Okabia	Ofeke Hall; Town Pri. School; Ogbezi Hall; Umuhu Okabia Hall; Alanganome Prim. Sch.; Duruma Hall; Amaegbejimba Hall; Umuopume Hall; Eziokwu Hall; Cent. School Umuhu; Amabada Hall; Ometu Dev. Hall; Okwudia Hall
Orsu (Awo Idemili)	Okwufuruaku	Police Station; Mbara Idemili Vill. Square; C. P. S. Ohukabia; C. P. S. Ohukabia Primary Sch.; Girls' Sec. School; Comm. School Amaokwe; Amaokwe Comm. Hall; Amaokolie Vill. Sq.; Awo Idemili Mat. Comp; Ama Kadueze Vill. Sq.
Orsu (Awo Idemili)	Okwuamaraihie I	Amaraihie Pri. School Ezeogwu; Akwaorji Hall Ezeogwu; Comm. Primary School Obibi
Orsu (Awo Idemili)	Okwuamaraihie II	Peoples Prim. Sch. Ubahaeze I; Peoples Prim. Sch. Ubahaeze II; Peoples Prim. Sch. Ubahaeze III; Amadim Prim. Sch.; Ama Uzoigwe Square
Orsu (Awo Idemili)	Okwuetiti	Cent. Sch. Awo-Idemili; Comm. Sec. Awo-Idemili; St. Simon's School; Isieke Hall; Edenta Vill. Square I; Edenta Vill. Square II; P. P. S. Dimaro Edenta; P. P. S. Edenta; Ubohaezike Hall; Ama Keven; Amaimo Village Hall; Edenta Vill. Square III
Orsu (Awo Idemili)	Orsu Ihiteukwa	Cent. Sch. Orsu Ihiteukwa; Union Prim. Sch. Okuru; Union Prim. Sch. Umunama; Union Prim. Sch. Ubaha Orsu; Pri. Sch. Ubaha Orsu; Amihie Primary School; Onymewulem Village Square; Sec. Sch. Orsu Ihitieukwa; Igwebuike Town Hall; Onyemegbulem Square Ubaha; Ama Ezekwere Village Square; Ezi Amihie Vill. Square; Ekek Ututu Market Square
Orsu (Awo Idemili)	Ihitenansa	Comm. Sch. Akama; Cent. School Umudiaba; Ozuru Market Square; Eke Ihite Market Square; C. P. S. Umudim; Umudim Hall; Ihitenasa Sec. Sch.; Umuala Hall; Nansa Primary School; C. P. S. Akama; Umuegwugwu Hall; Ama Obierie Vill. Square; Cent Sch. Ebonabu; Amaokpara Village Hall; Umuezionyi Vill. Hall; Ama Aguguesi Village Square; Ama Ogbuehi Square; Obinugwu Village Square; Ama Umuechizie Village Hall; Eziafor Akama Village Hall; Ama Uchenwoke Village Hall; Amaigwe Village Hall
Orsu (Awo Idemili)	Assah Ubiri Elem	Ama Laz Okafor Sq.; Assah Ubirielem Hall I; Comm. Sch. Assah Ubiri I; Comm. Sch. Assah Ubiri II; Elugwu Umuaka Hall; Mbaro Square; Ama Hycient Village Square; Amaezeoma Square Akpuobu; Ama Chima Square; Assah Ubirielem Hall II
Orsu (Awo Idemili)	Eziawa	Comp. Sec. School Eziawa; Comm. Sch. II Eziawa I; Comm. Sch. II Eziawa II; Comm. Sch. III Eziawa I; Comm. Sch. III Eziawa II; Comm. Sch. I Eziawa I; Comm. Sch. I Eziawa II
Orsu (Awo Idemili)	Amaruru	Obi Amaokwe; Ama Azubuike; Comm. Sch. III Ihungwo; Ama Ohiala-Elugwu; Ama Nwaokoro-Umueriwuala; C. S. I. Umuokporiri/Umuogu; Ama Nguma; Ama Udoyibo-Umunume; Ama Ihuojukwu; Ama Orji-Umuawula; Ama Ozorkwere Umugha; Ama Ajagwu Vill. Hall
Oru-East	Awo-Omamma I	Central School Isieke; Umuezike Primary School I; Isieke I Primary School I; Isieke I Primary School II; Unity Central School I; Unity Central School II; Umuduru Isieke Primary School; Umuezukwu Primary School I; Ubaheze Primary School; Comprehensive Secondary School, Awo; Umuezukwe Primary School II; Umuezike Primary School II; Umuezike Market Square
Oru-East	Awo-Omamma II	Umubochi Primary School; Okworji Primary School; Umudim Hall; Ubachima Primary School; Umuelibe Primary School; Oguboe Market Square; Pioneer Primary School I; Amaji Primary School I; Amaji Primary School II; Umuifa Hall; Pioneer Primary School II
Oru-East	Awo-Omamma III	Umuokwe Primary School I; Umuokwe Primary School II; Umuejike Hall; Umudaracha Hall; Obibi Primary School I; Obibi Primary School II; Ohuba Primary School; Umuokwe School; Umuokwe Primary School III
Oru-East	Awo-Omamma IV	Comm. Primary Sch. Uboawu; Amaukwu Village Sq., Umuokparachi; Umuejikereukwu Village Square; Ubaogwu Comm. Sec. School I; Obilofia Village Square; Umuezeali Primary School; Primary School, Umueme; Amaukwu Umueme Village Square; Amaukwu Umueme Across The Bridge; Ubaogwu Comm. Sec. School II; Ejikeakwa Village Square; Ubaogwu Comm. Sec. School III
Oru-East	Amiri I	Central School Ukwuegbu Umuocheta; Mbubu Progressive School; Community School Amaokpara; Umudioka Hall I; Hill-Top Primary School, Mbubu; Amiri Primary School Amuka; Isiorie Hall; St. Gregory Secondary School; Umudioka Hall II
Oru-East	Amiri II	Umuduru Hall; Comm. Primary School, Umuduru; Ubahazu Central School Umuonuoha; Comm. Primary Sch. Umuonuoha; United Primary School Ugeke; United Primary School Nchoko I; Central School Amiri; United Primary School, Nchoko II; Boys' Secondary School, Amiri; Cms School Umuduru Njaba; United Primary School Nchoko III
Oru-East	Akuma	Akuma School Akuma I; Akuma School Akuma II; Civic Centre Akuma; Govt. School Akuma I; Govt. School Akuma II; Akuma Secondary School; Amimo Village Square; Afor Akuma Market Square; Akuma School Akuma III
Oru-East	Akata	Central School Akata; Ihitte Primary School; Okwu Akata Hall; Ubahu Primary School I; Comm. Primary School, Kurah; Middle Age Hall Ichi I; Middle Age Hall Ichi II; Akwa Civic Centre; Umuokpara Akwa Hall; Ohana Hall; Community Primary School, Okporo Akatta; Ubaha Primary School II; Progressive Primary School, Aziakatta I; Akatta Town Hall I; Women Education Centre; Akatta Town Hall II; Progressive Primary School, Aziakatta II
Oru-East	Omuma	Umuhu Primary School; Court Hall Etiti; Amaodum Primary School; Umuezeala Hall; Ubaha Hall; Central School Omuma; Powerline Primary School; Ozuh Primary School; Ihite Hall; Ozuh Hall; Abia Central School; Omuma Community School; Okwu-Ozuh Hall; Ukwu-Uhie Square
Oru West (Mgbidi)	Nempi/Elem	Nempi Primary School; Nkwo Ugbele Primary School; Nempi Health Centre; Eastern Nempi Primary School; Western Nempi Primary School; Nempi Sec. School; Ogadinma Sec. School I; Ogadinma Sec. School II; State Primary School Eleh I; State Primary School Eleh II; Community Primary School I; Community Primary School II; Ezi-Eleh Village Square; Ihite-Eleh Village Square; Ezioma Nempi Civic Hall I; Ezioma Nempi Civic Hall II
Oru West (Mgbidi)	Otulu	Progressive Cent. School; C. P. S. Otulu I; C. P. S. Otulu II; Community Hall Otulu; Sec. Comm. School Otulu; Okechukwu Hall; Wilfred Civic Centre; Ama Wire; Okwuora; Amacheleke Village Square
Oru West (Mgbidi)	Aji	Community Primary School I; Community Primary School II; Central School Aji; Ubahaeze Old Treasury; Ubuhumpam Village Square; Ama Eze Obidike
Oru West (Mgbidi)	Ibiaso Egbe	Comm. Primary School Ibiasoegbe; Ibiasoegbe Court Hall; Progressive Primary School; Udoma Primary School; Agumiri Central School I; Umuonucha Village Square; Amadaba Social Club; Hill Top Primary School; Agumiri Centre School II
Oru West (Mgbidi)	Amafuo	Ubaha Civic Centre; Amaofuo Post Office; Eke Amaofuo Market; Amaofuo Primary School; Ebiri Primary School
Oru West (Mgbidi)	Ohakpu	Institute Of Management; C. P. S. Ohakpu I; C. P. S. Ohakpu II; Sec. School Ohakpu; Aro-Ndiekwara Square; Masquerade Square
Oru West (Mgbidi)	Ozara	Masquerade Square; Town School; Central School I; Central School II; Comprehensive Secondary School; Aboh Primary School
Oru West (Mgbidi)	Ubulu	Mbachu Primary School; Ama Enwenonu Square; Onyebunwana Square; Comprehensive Secondary School Ubulu I; Comprehensive Secondary School Ubulu II; Central School Ubulu; Nobis Primary School, Ubulu I; Nobis Primary School Ubulu II; Ihebigbo Primary School; Umuom Health Centre; New Eru Club; C. P. S.(Jnr.) Eziama Ubulu; Community Primary School Eziama I; Community Primary School Eziama II; Community Primary School Eziama III; New Era Club-Hall Eziama; Ubadara Village Square; Ama Enweonu I; Ama Enweonu II; Ama Ogwa Omuonyeyele; Ama Muonwu Eziama Enwere; Ndi Okwu Village Square; Ositadinma Club Hall I; Ositadinma Club Hall II
Oru West (Mgbidi)	Mgbidi I	Umuorji Girls' Secondary School I; Umuorji Girls' Secondary School II; Ihite Primary School; Nkwo Ihite Market; Primary School Ndehu I; Primary School Ndehu II; Umuohiaku Primary School; Primary School Igba; Orie Umuabiam Market; Ama Omerenna Square; Community Primary School I; Community Primary School II; Umuagama Village Square I; Umuagama Village Square II; Ama-Nneaka Village Square I; Ama-Nneaka Village Square II; Alioji Village Square; Umuabiahu Square
Oru West (Mgbidi)	Mgbidi II	Ndam Hall; Central School I; Central School II; Mgbidi Boys' Secondary School I; Town School; Mgbidi Boys' Secondary School II; Ugbele Primary School; New Layout Primary School; Amaicheoku Square; Ezeani Primary School; Amachukwu; Umuodimma Village Square; Amawuse/Eke Mgbidi Market I; Amawuse/Eke Mgbidi Market II; Afor Ugbele Market Square; Amaekwesike Village Square; Umuorji Village Square; Umuoma T. Junction
Owerri Municipal	Aladinma I	Housing Estate Primary School I; Housing Estate Primary School II; Housing Estate Primary School III; Housing Estate Primary School IV; Startright Primary School I; Startright Primary School II; Imsu I; Imsu II
Owerri Municipal	Aladinma II	Unity Primary School I; Unity Primary School II; Unity Primary School III; St. Paul's School I; St. Paul's School II; St. Paul's School III
Owerri Municipal	Ikenegbu I	Mann St. Primary School I; Mann St. Primary School II; Mann St. Primary School III; Mann St. Primary School IV; Township Primary School I; Township Primary School II; Township Primary School III; Township Primary School IV; Sam Njemanze Primary School I; Sam Njemanze Primary School II; Sam Njemanze Primary School III; Sam Njemanze Primary School IV; Oha Owerri Hall I; Oha Owerri Hall II; Okigwe Road Park I; Okigwe Road Park II
Owerri Municipal	Ikenegbu II	Ikenegbu Secondary School I; Ikenegbu Secondary School II; Ikenegbu Secondary School III; Front Of Ikenegbu (First Nursery/Primary School I); Front Of Ikenegbu(First Nursery/Primary School II); St. Juliana Int. Nursery/Primary School; Main Stadium I; Main Stadium II; Main Stadium III; Main Stadium IV; G. T. C. I; G. T. C. II
Owerri Municipal	Azuzi I	St. Paul Primary School I; St. Paul Primary School II; St. Paul Primary School III; St. Paul Primary School IV; St. Paul Primary School V; St. Paul Primary School VI; St. Paul Primary School VII; Water Side Primary School I; Water Side Primary School II; Water Side Primary School III; Water Side Primary School IV; Water Side Primary School V; Water Side Primary School VI
Owerri Municipal	Azuzi II	Emmanuel College I; Emmanuel College II; Emmanuel College III; Emmanuel College IV; Assumpta Primary School I; Assumpta Primary School II; Assumpta Primary School III; Timber Shed Hall I; Timber Shed Hall II; Timber Shed Hall III; Holiness Nurs/Primary School
Owerri Municipal	Azuzi III	Nekede Mech. Village Hall I; Nekede Mech. Village Hall II; Dev. Primary School I; Dev. Primary School II; Dev. Primary School III; Dev. Primary School IV; New Market Hall I; New Market Hall II; New Market Hall III; New Market Hall IV
Owerri Municipal	Azuzi IV	Uzii Primary School I; Uzii Primary School II; Uzii Primary School III; Uzii Primary Schooliv; Uzii Primary School V; Uzii Primary School VI; Uzii Primary School VII; Baptist Primary/Nursery School I; Baptist Primary/Nursery School II; Old Mbaise Park I; Old Mbaise Park II; Old Mbaise Park III
Owerri Municipal	Gra	Multi-Purpose Hall I; Multi-Purpose Hall II; Madonna Primary School; Shell Camp Primary School I; Shell Camp Primary School II; Aice Pavillion St.; Education Service Department I; Education Service Department II; Government College Owerri; Daice Nursery School; Imo International Conference Centre(Imo Hotels)
Owerri Municipal	New Owerri I	Model Primary School I; Model Primary School II; Model Primary School III; Urban Secondary School; World Bank Primary School I; World Bank Primary School II; World Bank Primary School III; Opposite St Mark's Cath Church Fhe I(Eton Day Primary School I); Opposite St Mark's Cath Church Fhe II (Eton Day Primary School II)
Owerri Municipal	New Owerri II	Holy Ghost College I; Holy Ghost College II; Owerri Girls' Secondary School I; Owerri Girls' Secondary School II; Beside Temple Filling Station, Akajaku Road(Fizz Primary School I); Beside Temple Filling Station Akajaku Road II (Fizz Primary School II); Holy Ghost Park I; Holy Ghost Park II; Concord Hotel
Owerri North (Orie Uratta)	Awaka/Ihitte-Ogada	Ekeama Primary School Awaka I; Ekeama Primary School Awaka II; Community Primary School Amapu Awaka I; Community Primary School Amapu Awaka II; Amuzi Awaka Village Square; Community Primary School Ihitta-Ogada I; Community Primary School Ihitta-Ogada II; Ihitta-Ogada-Village Square
Owerri North (Orie Uratta)	Naze	St. John's Central School Naze I; St. John's Central School Naze II; St. John's Central School Naze III; St. Jude's Community School Naze I; Naze Secondary School I; Naze Secondary School II; Nkwo Naze Market Square; Alaoma Village Square I; Alaoma Village Square II
Owerri North (Orie Uratta)	Egbu	Central School Egbu I; Central School Egbu II; Girls' Secondary School Egbu I; Girls' Secondary School Egbu II; Primary School Egbu I; Primary School Egbu II; Comprehensive Secondary School Egbu; Oha Egbu Hall I; Oha Egbu Hall II
Owerri North (Orie Uratta)	Emii	Central School Emii Umuorisha; Umuorisha Village Square; Community School Emeohe Emii; Ebikoro Primary School Emii; Primary School Mgbahiri; Primary School Umuebee-Eziala; Progressive Primary School Umuawuka; Mbutu Umuawuka Village Square; Emii Technical School Emii; Comm. Central School Umuolu; Health Centre Ubah Emii I; Health Centre Ubah Emii II; Eziala Village Square
Owerri North (Orie Uratta)	Emekuku I	Emekuku High School I; Emekuku High School II; Chief Obi Mem. Primary School Emekuku I; Chief Obi Mem. Primary School Emekuku II; Community Central School Kemekuku; Ezelukwu Primary School I; Ezelukwu Primary School II; Okwuemeke Village Square I; Okwuemeke Village Square II; Nkwo Ezeogba Market Square
Owerri North (Orie Uratta)	Emekuku II	T. T. Practicing School Azaraegbelu I; T. T. Practicing School Azaraegbelu II; Uboegbelu Primary School I; Uboegbelu Primary School II; Ubowala Primary School I; Ubowala Primary School II; Emekuku Comprehensive Secondary School I; Emekuku Comprehensive Secondary School II; Azara-Owalla Village Square
Owerri North (Orie Uratta)	Orji	Community Primary School, Orji I; Community Primary School, Orji II; Community Primary School, Orji III; Umudula Village Square; Township School Orji I; Township School Orji II; Mechanic Village Hall Orji I; Mechanic Village Hall Orji II; Mechanic Village Hall Orji III; Ebiri Ukwu Orji I; Ebiri Ukwu Orji II; Front Of Fire Brand Nurs/Pro Sch Umougii(Bilgrim Comm. Secondary School Umuogii); Umumike Village Square; Works Layout Market Square I; Works Layout Market Square II; Nkwo Orji Market Square; Orji Youth Cultural Hall; Umuasonye Village Hall
Owerri North (Orie Uratta)	Ihitta-Oha	Girls' Sec. School, Akwakuma I; Girls' Sec. School, Akwakuma II; Girls' Sec. School, Akwakuma III; Comm. Pri. School, Akwakuma I; Comm. Pri. School, Akwakuma II; Comm. Pri. School, Akwakuma III; Comprehensive Sec. School Amakohia I; Comprehensive Sec. School Amakohia II; Orlu Road Prim. School Amakohia I; Orlu Road Prim. School Amakohia II; Comm. Primary School Amakohia; Comm. Primary School Amakohia (Junior) I; Comm. Primary School Amakohia (Junior) II; Comm. Primary School Amakohia (Senior) I; Comm. Primary School Amakohia (Senior) II; Akwakuma Market Square I; Akwakuma Market Square II; Police Primary School Amakohia
Owerri North (Orie Uratta)	Obibi-Uratta I	Community Primary School Umualum; Umuorii Primary School (Junior) I; Umuorii Primary School (Junior) II; Orie Umuorii Market Square; Community Primary School Umuoba I; Community Primary School Umuoba II; Community Primary School Umuoba III; Town Hall Nkwo Umuoba I; Town Hall Nkwo Umuoba II; Community School Okwu Uratta I; Community School Okwu Uratta II; Okwu Village Square; Fair Child Nursery School I; Fair Child Nursery School II
Owerri North (Orie Uratta)	Obibi-Uratta II	Community School Ihitte Oha; Uratta Secondary School; Umunahu Primary School I; Umunahu Primary School II; Umunahu Primary School III; Community School Owalla (Ndiokwu) I; Community School Owalla (Ndiokwu) II; Ekeobi Market Square Owalla Ndiuhu; Ukwuobu Square Owalla Umuosuagwu I; Ukwuobu Square Owalla Umuosuagwu II; Owaelu Primary School I; Owaelu Primary School II
Owerri North (Orie Uratta)	Agbala/Obube/Ulakwo	Community School Agbala I; Community School Agbala II; Community Central School Ulakwo I; Community Central School Ulakwo II; Community Central School Ulakwo III; Ndiama Village Square; Umuovum Village Square I; Umuovum Village Square II; Primary School Obube I; Primary School Obube II; Primary School Obube III; Umuokpaa Village Square Obube; St. Micheals Primary School Ngwoma; Emeke Agbala Village
Owerri North (Orie Uratta)	Obibiezena	Comm. Primary School, Amaorie; Egbelu Emeke Village Square; Okpuruakwa Ezeagu Amaeze; Primary School Eshiedi; Ogbeke Village Square; Amaejiofor Village Square, Amaorie; Comm. School Obibiezena I; Comm. School Obibiezena II; Ebikoro Village Square Oamaeze
Owerri West (Umuguma)	Avu/Oforola	Primary School Avu I; Central School Avu I; Central School Avu II; Central School Oforola I; Central School Oforola II; Ola Primary School; Ogbakoro Village Square; Oforola Comm. School Sec.; Primary School Avu II; Central School Avu III
Owerri West (Umuguma)	Umuguma	Development Primary School I; Development Primary School II; Comm. School Umuguma; U'Okanne Village Square; Ogbosisi Market Square I; Kohaumuonmaegbu; Ogbosisi Market Square II
Owerri West (Umuguma)	Emeabiam/Okolochi	Nkwo-Olukwu Market Square; Umudim/Umuikea Village Square; Kumuodu/Egbelu Village Square; Dev. Primary School Umuokpo; L. A. Primary School U'Okpo; Nkasi Village Square; Est. Sec. Sch. Emeabiam; Comm. Primary School Okpuala; Nducity Comm. School Okpuala; Aforukwu Market Square; Umuikea Town Hall I; Umuike Town Hall II; Central School Umuso; Comm. Primary School, Okolochi I; Comm. Primary School, Okolochi II; Danben Comm. College Okolochi; Ogbakoro Ohamara Okolochi I; Ogbakoro Ohamara Okolochi II; Umuika Town Hall; Comm. Primary School Okolochi III; Ogbakoro Ohamara, Okolochi III
Owerri West (Umuguma)	Eziobodo	Central School Eziobodo I; Umuayo Village Square; Comm. School Umuayo; Okpuruokpu Square; Umuechem Village Square; Orie Eziobodo; Central School Eziobodo II; Central School Eziobodo III
Owerri West (Umuguma)	Ihiagwa	L. A. School Ihiagwa I; L. A. School Ihiagwa II; Ihiagwa Secondary School I; Health Centre Ihiagwa; Comm. Cent. School Ihiagwa; Comm. School Ihiagwa I; Comm. School Ihiagwa II; Comm. Primary School (Baptist); Ihiagwa Secondary School II; Comm. School Ihiagwa III
Owerri West (Umuguma)	Nekede	Umualum Primary School I; Umualum Primary School II; Umualum Primary School III; Nekede Town School I; Umualum Primary School IV; Nekede Town School II; Central School Nekede I; Nekede Town School III; Nekede Town School IV; Ogbakoro Village Square; Orieu'Dibia Hall I; Comm. School U'Dibia; Umukoto Village Square; Central School Nekede II; Nekede Secondary School; Ogbakoro U'Dochie; Central School Nekede III; Ogbakoro U'Dochie Village Square I; Oha Hall Nekede; Ogbakoro U'Dochie Village Square II; Umualum Primary School V; Orieu'Dibia Hall II
Owerri West (Umuguma)	Obinze	Primary School Azudo I; Primary School Azudo II; Comm. Primary School Aladoro I; Comm. Primary School Aladoro II; Practicing School Obinze I; Practicing School Obinze II; Army Children School I; Housa Quarters; Practicing School Obinze III; Army Children School II
Owerri West (Umuguma)	Amakohia-Ubi/Ndegwu Ohii	Primary School Amakohia Ubi I; Primary School Amakohia Ubi II; Comm. School Amakohiaubi I; Comm. School Amakohiaubi II; Primary School Ndegwu I; Primary School Ndegwu II; Comm. School Ndegwu I; Comm. School Ndegwu II; Primary School Ohii I; Primary School Ohii II; Comm. School Ohii I; Comm. School Ohii II; Comm. School Amakohiaubi III; Primary School Ndegwu III; Comm. School Amakohiaubi IV
Owerri West (Umuguma)	Irete/Orogwe	Comm. Primary School Irete I; Comm. Primary School Irete II; Irete Sec. Tech. School I; Comm. School Irete I; Comm. School Irete II; T. T. C. Irete I; T. T. C. Irete II; T. T. C. Irete III; T. T. C. Irete IV; T. T. C. Irete V; T. T. C. Irete VI; T. T. C. Irete VII; Irete Sec. Tech. School II; Ukwezi Primary School Orogwe I; Ukwezi Primary School Orogwe II; Uba Village Square; Comm. School Orogwe; Umunomo Village Square; Amato Well I; Amato Well II; Cocacola Square; Irete Sec. Tech. School III; Comm. Primary School Irete III; T. T. C. Irete VIII
