= Simeon Okezuo Nwobi =

Nigerian Catholic prelate (born 1960)

The Most Reverend Simeon Okezuo Nwobi C.M.F.
- Bishop of Ahiara; Nigeria
- Church: Catholic Church
- Archdiocese: Roman Catholic Archdiocese of Owerri
- See: Diocese of Ahiara
- Appointed: 3 May 2024
- Installed: 20 June 2024
- Predecessor: Peter Ebere Okpaleke (7 December 2012 - 19 February 2018)
- Successor: Incumbent
- Previous posts: Auxiliary Bishop of Ahiara, Nigeria (14 October 2023 - 3 May 2024)

Orders
- Ordination: 21 July 1990 by Plácido Rodriguez
- Consecration: 19 December 2023 by Lucius Iwejuru Ugorji

Personal details
- Born: Simeon Okezuo Nwobi; 25 March 1960 (age 66) Eziama Oparanadim Ekwereazu, Diocese of Ahiara. Imo State, Nigeria
- Motto: "Spes non confundit" (Hope does not disappoint)

Styles of Simeon Okezuo Nwobi
- Reference style: His Grace; The Most Reverend
- Spoken style: Your Grace
- Religious style: Bishop

Simeon Okezuo Nwobi C.M.F. (born 25 March 1960) is a Nigerian Catholic prelate who serves as the bishop of the Roman Catholic Diocese of Ahiara, in Nigeria since 3 May 2024. Before that, from 14 October 2023 until 3 May 2024, he served as Auxiliary Bishop and apostolic administrator of the same Catholic See. He was appointed bishop by Pope Francis. He was concurrently assigned Titular Bishop of Rusguniae, while auxiliary bishop. He received his episcopal consecration at Ahiara on 19 December 2023 by the hands of Lucius Iwejuru Ugorji, Archbishop of Owerri. The Holy Father elevated him to local ordinary at Ahiara on 3 May 2024. He was installed there on 20 June 2024. He is a professed member of the Congregation of Missionary Sons of the Immaculate Heart of the Blessed Virgin Mary (Claretians).

== Background and education ==
He was born on 25 March 1960 in Eziama Oparanadim Ekwereazu, in the Diocese of Ahiara, Imo State, Nigeria. He became a member of the Congregation of Missionary Sons of the Immaculate Heart of Mary (Claretians), when he was in his early 20's. He studied philosophy at the Claretian Institute of Philosophy (CIP), located in Maryland Nekede, Owerri, Imo State, Nigeria. He then studied theology at the Bigard Memorial Seminary in Enugu. He holds a postgraduate diploma in public administration from the Enugu State University of Science and Technology in Enugu. He graduated with a licentiate in missiology from the Pontifical Gregorian University in Rome, Italy. His Master of Public Administration degree was awarded by the National Open University of Nigeria.

== Priest ==
He took his preliminary vows as a member of the Claretians on 25 March 1983. On 11 September 1988, he took his perpetual vows for the same religious order. He was ordained a priest for his order on 21 July 1990 at Owerri by Plácido Rodriguez, C.M.F., Titular Bishop of Fuerteventura. He served as a priest until 14 October 2023. While a priest, he served in various roles and locations, including:

- Parish priest at Saint Anthony in Igbo-Ora from 1990 until 1992.
- Bursar at Claretian Theology, Enugu from 1992 until 1997.
- Director of the Department of Spirituality at the Claretian Institute of Philosophy Maryland, Nedeke from 1999 until 2000.
- Professor at the Bigard Memorial Seminary of Enugu from 2000 until 2009.
- Prefect of the Apostolate at the Claretian Provincial Curia of New Owerri from 2005 until 2010.
- Parish priest of Saint Paul in Nedeke from 2006 until 2010.
- Provincial of the East Province of Nigeria of the Missionary Sons of the Immaculate Heart of Mary from 2010 until 2022.

== Bishop ==
On 14 October 2023, Pope Francis appointed him Titular Bishop of Rusguniae, and concurrently Auxiliary Bishop and apostolic administrator of the Catholic Diocese of Ahiara, Nigeria. He received his episcopal consecration at Ahiara on 19 December 2023. The Principal Consecrator was Lucius Iwejuru Ugorji, Archbishop of Owerri who was assisted by Wilfred Chikpa Anagbe, Bishop of Makurdi and Augustine Tochukwu Ukwuoma, Bishop of Orlu.

On 3 May 2024, The Holy Father appointed him Bishop of the Diocese of Ahiara. He was installed there as local ordinary on 20 June 2024.

== See also ==
- Roman Catholicism in Nigeria

== Succession table ==
Catholic Church titles
Preceded by Peter Ebere Okpaleke (7 December 2012 - 19 February 2018)	Bishop of Ahiara (since 3 May 2024)	Succeeded by (Incumbent)
Preceded by	Auxiliary Bishop of Ahiara (14 October 2023 - 3 May 2024)	Succeeded by
