= Moses Chikwe =

Bishop of the Catholic Archdiocese of Owerri

Moses Chikwe (born 3 April 1967) is a Nigerian prelate and Auxiliary Bishop of the Catholic Archdiocese of Owerri since 2019. He was kidnapped in transit along with his driver on 27 December and reportedly rescued on 30 December 2020 after widespread rumour that he had been killed by the kidnappers and his body found. He was ordained into priesthood in 1996 and served as an assistant parish priest in various parishes before moving to the United States for studies and pastoral services until 2016 when he returned to Nigeria.

== Background and education ==
Moses Chikwe was born 3 April 1967 to Moses Nwamadi and Anthonia Nwaobiara as the last of ten children of the family just months before the Nigeria Civil War. His parents were devout Catholics, and his mother was a member of Sacred Heart, Legion of Mary, Saint Jude and mother of Perpetual Succuor. She often took Moses along with her to the devotions. This inspired Chikwe to recite rosary and singing Marian songs. His interest to join the priesthood came at the age of ten when he saw a priest celebrating holy mass and thought that the priest was already in heaven. His parents were not educated but made a vow to educate all their ten children to at least secondary school level.

After his primary education in 1981 at the age of 14, he was admitted to Saint Mary's minor seminary where he spent one year before transferring to St. Peter Claver Seminary, Okpala finishing in 1987 with West African School Certificate Examination (WASCE). Chikwe was retained in the school for a one-year apostolic service teaching. In 1988, he was sent to St. Joseph's major seminary where he studied Philosophy graduating with magna cum laude (second class upper). In 1992, Chikwe began his Theology studies at Bigard Memorial Seminary graduating again with magna cum laude in 1996.

== Priestly career ==
He was ordained on 6 July 1996 with eight others by Bishop Anthony J.V Obinna at Maria Assumpta Cathedral, Owerri. His first pastoral posting was to holy cross parish, Emii as an assistant to Fr John Ibe for one year and then posted to ST. Columba's parish, Amaimo as an assistant to Fr. Bartholomew Okere from 1997 to 1998. From 1998 to 2002, he served as an assistant director at Assumpta press and The Leader newspaper.

Chikwe was sent to Loyola Marymount University, Los Angeles, in 2002 for a master's degree studies in Educational Administration graduating in 2005 winning Graduate Administration Student, Award. During his studies, he served as priest in residence at Visitation Church, Westchester from 2002 to 2005. Chikwe served as chaplain of UCLA Medical Center where he earned a certification in Clinical Pastoral Education (CPE) between 2005 and 2007. In 2006, he got a scholarship at the University of California, Los Angeles for a doctoral study in Educational Administration finishing in 2013.

During his doctoral studies, Chikwe served in several churches including at St. Mark's Church in Venice as priest in residence from 2007 to 2010 and was chaplain of Veterans Hospital from 2008 to 2010. He was priest in residence at St. Joseph's Cathedral, San Diego from 2011 to 2016 when he returned to Nigeria. On 17 October 2019, Pope Francis appointed Moses as Auxiliary bishop of Owerri Archdiocese and assigned Titular See of Flumenzer. He was ordained bishop on 12 December 2019 at Maria Assumpta Cathedral, Owerri.

He was kidnapped in transit along with his driver on 27 December and reportedly rescued on 30 December 2020 after widespread rumour that he had been killed by the kidnappers and his body found. It was not clear whether a ransom was paid for his release but the police claimed he was freed in a rescue operation. After his release, Chikwe recounted his ordeal to including being stripped, blindfolded and walking long distance in forest for several hours.
