= Ahiazu Mbaise =

Local Government Area in Imo State, Nigeria

- LGA
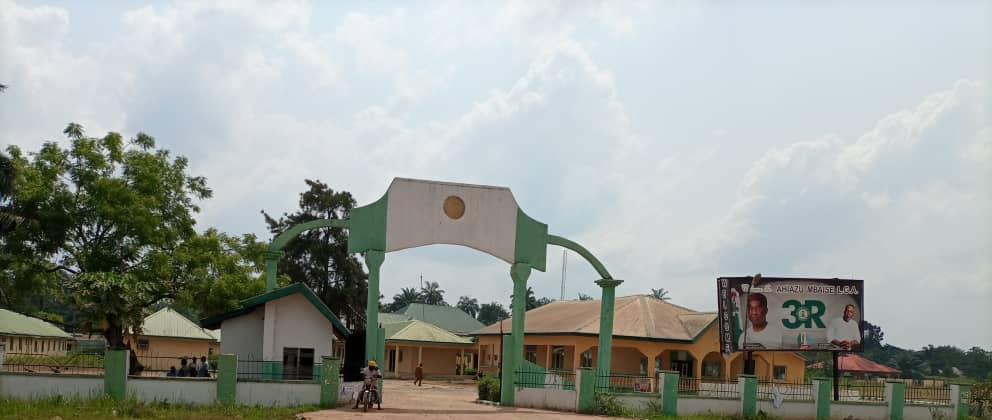
- Ahiazu Mbaise Headquarters Entrance
- Interactive map of Ahiazu Mbaise
- Location within Nigeria
- Coordinates: 5°33′45″N 7°15′40″E
- Country: Nigeria
- State: Imo State
- Capital: Afor-Oru

Government
  - Local Government Chairman: Larry Obinna Chikwe

Area
  - Land: 114 km^{2} (44 sq mi)

Population (2006)
  - Total: 170,902
  - Density: 1,500/km^{2} (3,880/sq mi)
- Time zone: UTC+1 (WAT)
- Postal code: 463

Ahiazu Mbaise is a Local Government Area in Imo State, Nigeria. It has an area of 114 km^{2} and an estimated population of 170,902 as of the 2006 census. It is the result of a merger between Ahiara and Ekwerazu towns, and it is headquartered in the town of Afor-Oru.

The local government area is bounded to the north by Isiala Mbano and Ehime Mbano, to the east by Obowo and Ihitte Uboma, to the south by Ezinihitte Mbaise and Aboh Mbaise and to the west by Ikeduru.

== Organization ==
Communities that make up Ahiazu Mbaise include those from Ahiara:

- Agu na Eze
- Akabo
- Amuzi
- Nnarambia
- Obodo
- Ogbe
- Ogwuama
- Otulu
- Oru na Nneude
- Ujichi

and those from Ekwereazu:

- Ihitte-Afor Ukwu
- Mpam
- Obohia
- Oparanadim
- Umuokrika (now Okrika-Nwankwo and Okrika-Nweke)

== Administration ==
The postal code of the area is 463.

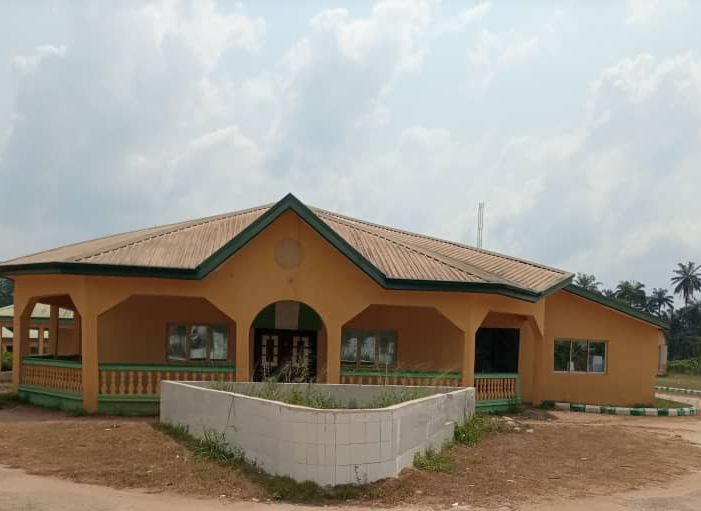
Ahiazu Mbaise Headquarters Building
