= Chike Okafor =

Nigerian politician

Member of the House of Representatives of Nigeria from Imo
- Constituency: Ehime Mbano/Ihitte Uboma/Obowo

Personal details
- Born: 15 November 1972 (age 53) Umuokeh, Obowo
- Citizenship: Nigeria
- Party: All Progressive Congress
- Spouse: Akudo Okafor
- Children: 3
- Education: Imo State University, Enugu State University of Science and Technology
- Occupation: Politician

Chike Okafor is a Nigerian politician. He is serving currently as a member representing Ehime Mbano/Ihitte Uboma/Obowo Federal Constituency in the House of Representatives.

== Early life and marriage ==
Chike Okafor was born on 15 November 1972 in Umuokeh, Obowo LGA, Imo State. He is married to Deaconess Akudo Okafor with three children.

== Education ==
After completing his primary and secondary education at Imo State in primary & secondary education in Imo State, he proceeded to study at Imo State University and obtained a BSc. in Economics in 1998. He ventured into the banking in 1999, spending 12 years, and rose to the ranks of Senior Manager with Zenith Bank Plc. In addition, he holds a Masters Degree in Human Resources Management from ESUT Business School. He is a Fellow of the Nigerian Institute of Management (NIM), and the Institute of Chartered Economists of Nigeria. He is also a member of the National Institute of Marketing of Nigeria (MNIMN) and the Chartered Institute of Personnel Administration (CIPM).

== Political career ==
He began as a Commissioner for Finance, Imo State from June 2011 to October 2014. He contested the House of Representatives elections in 2015 under the platform of the All Progressive Congress (APC) and emerged victorious. Amongst several other positions, he once served as House Committee Chairman on Healthcare services. He has served in the 8th and 9th Assembly as a member representing his constituency. The federal lawmaker in October 2024 distributed bags of fertilizer to his constituents as part of support to promoting agricultural development and enhancing food security in Nigeria.

== Legal challenge and victory ==
An Appeal Court sitting in Lagos affirmed Chike Okafor as winner of the House of Representatives election for Ehime Mbano/Ihitte Uboma/Obowo Federal Constituency. This was in harmony with the early declaration by the Imo State Election Petition Tribunal, sitting in Mararaba, Nasarawa State, which nullified the election victory of Hon Jonas Okeke of the Peoples Democratic Party (PDP) held in February 2023.

== Religion ==
Chike Okafor is a deacon and a Christian.

== Awards and honors ==
- Most Distinguished Lawmaker of the year, Face of Arise Afrika Awards
- Paul Harris Fellow Award, Rotary International
- Prince of Umuokeh Kingdom, Obowo Local Government Area, Imo State
