= Otulu =

Otulu may refer to one of a number of populated places in Imo State, Nigeria:

- Otulu, Ahiara
- Otulu, Oru West
