= Iwa Akwa =

Igbo Traditional Festival

Iwa Akwa or Aju
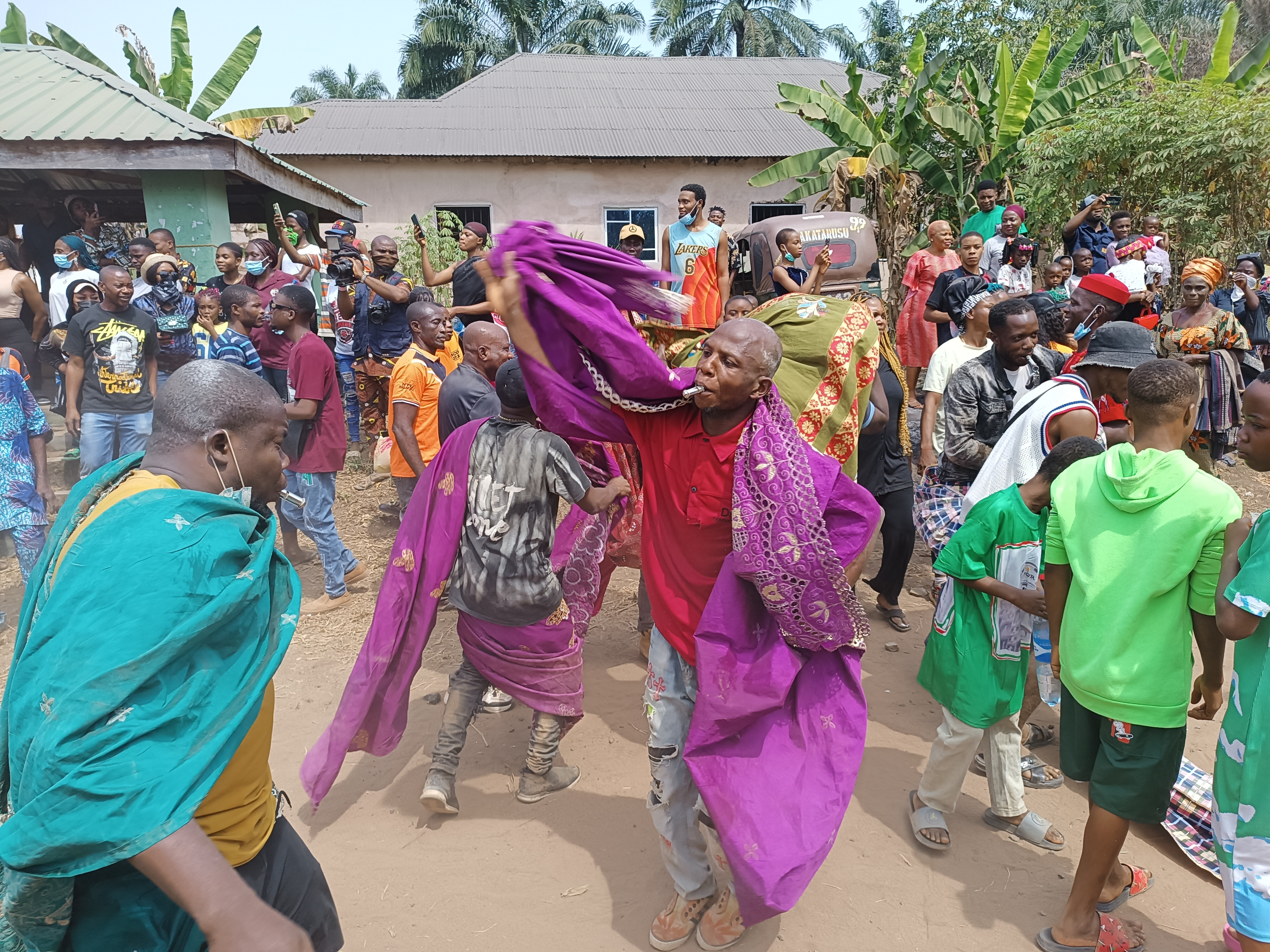
- Location: The Eastern Part of Nigeria
- Country: Nigeria

Iwa Akwa or Aju Festival which can also be translated as Cloth Wearing is a traditional ceremony that is practised by the Igbo people to indicate that a boy has become a man. Iwa Akwa ceremony is a triennial festival that occurs in Obowo, Ihitte/Uboma, the Ehime Mbano, Ahiazu Mbaise local government areas of Imo state in Nigeria.

== Background ==
Iwa Akwa Festival is part of the ancient history of Igbo. Whoever dies without performing the rites would be regarded as a child and would be buried the same day just like a child.

== Initiation process ==
=== Investigation Stage ===
The members of the community would investigate the boys who are going to participate in the initiation. The age of the boys, the mother of the boys and the father of the boys would be investigated. The boys are supposed to be between the age of 21 and 26 years; the mother must have been married and known by the community and the father must have passed through the process.

=== The Preparation Stage ===
After the investigation has been completed, the family of the participants goes to the market to buy high quality clothes that would be used for the initiation and also make sure that the reception venue is ready for the guests.

=== The Initiation Stage ===
The participants are to follow strictly what the elderly men who have passed through the process dictate for them. The families of the participants are expected to spread wrapper in front of their compounds to receive the blessings of a spiritual leader who walks barefooted along the streets.

== Life after initiation ==
The boys who participated are regarded as men and they can take up governance or any other traditional title in the community.
