= Assumpta Cathedral =

Latin Catholic cathedral in Nigeria

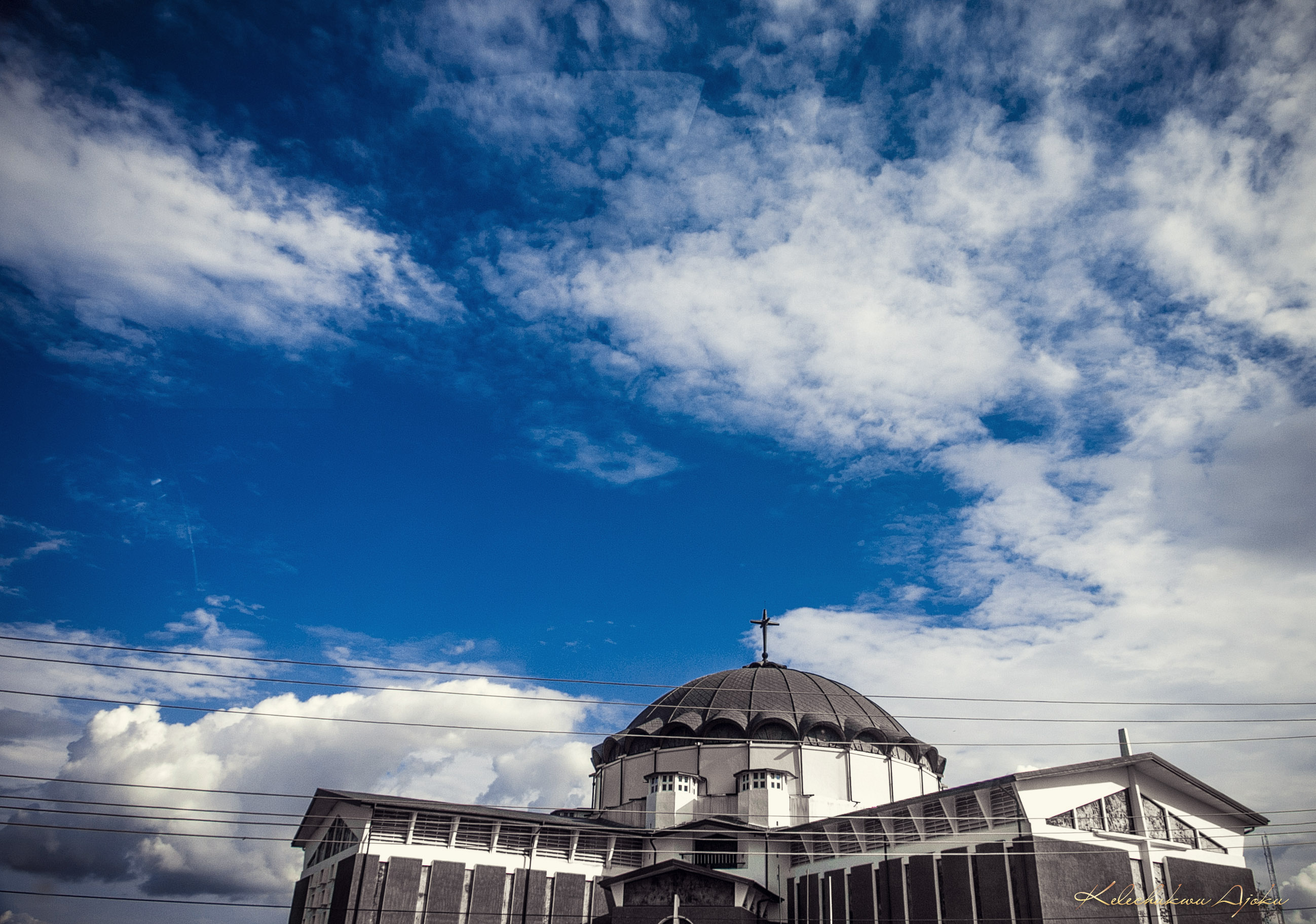
- Assumpta Cathedral
- 5°29′20″N 7°01′18″E
- Location: Owerri, Imo State
- Country: Nigeria
- Denomination: Catholic Church
- Sui iuris church: Latin Church
- Tradition: Roman Rite

Architecture
- Architect(s): Hooper & Mayne
- Architectural type: Renaissance
- Style: Tropical Modernism
- Years built: 1954 – 1980
- Completed: 1980
- Closed: 1967 – 1970

Administration
- Province: Province fo Owerri
- Archdiocese: Owerri

Clergy
- Archbishop: Lucius Iwejuru Ugorji

The Assumpta Cathedral, also called Owerri Cathedral, is a Catholic cathedral in Owerri, Imo State, Nigeria. The mother church of the Archdiocese of Owerri, it is dedicated to Assumption of the Virgin Mary.

== History ==
Construction of the cathedral began in 1954 and was dedicated in 1980. The plan to build a modern cathedral in Owerri was led by the diocese and its Irish bishop, Joseph Brendan Whelan. Funds were sourced from church members and from abroad, in particular, Rome. An Irish priest, Christopher King who was also an architect supervised the construction of the structure right before the Civil War. The site chosen for the cathedral was at the outskirts of Owerri near an inter-state road junction that links Owerri to Port Harcourt, Onitsha, and Aba. The commencement of the Nigerian Civil War impeded construction from 1967 to 1970. Before the war, construction had progressed and the main part of the building with the exception of the roof deck and covering was already finished. During the war, the site of the cathedral came under fire a few times because the dome was thought to be an observation post.

The architectural style of the building is similar to Renaissance ecclesiastical. The structure of the church is designed in the shape of a Greek cross with four naves of equal length spread in opposite directions and between the naves will four chapels. The altar is centrally located and has a dome that reaches 120 feet in height and 101 feet in diameter. The interior floor is made of marble while the material of the structure is reinforced concrete. The capacity of the building is 3,000.

== Architecture ==
The Assumpta Cathedral plan has a cruciform planned shape, common in European ecclesiastical architecture. Its layout resembles a Greek cross, with arms of equal length. The central dome, symbolic of heavenly presence. The use of radial symmetry enhances spatial order and symbolic meaning.

The nave, aisles, transepts, and sanctuary are spatially organized to facilitate liturgical procession and congregational gathering. The dome serves as the liturgical and visual focal point. Windows and arches create a rhythm of light and shadow, enhancing the sensory and symbolic experience.

Postmodern aspects emerge in the use of eclectic forms, Romanesque domes, Renaissance-like columns, and vernacular finishes. Ornamentation appears not only in altar pieces but also in the dome’s coffered ceiling and facade detailing. Pattern language, repetition of arches, axial procession, and symbolic domes communicate religious and cultural messages.

== See also ==
- Cathedral of the Holy Cross, Lagos
- Catholic Church in Nigeria
- List of cathedrals in Nigeria
