= Peter Okpaleke =

Nigerian prelate of the Catholic Church (born 1963)

His Eminence Peter Ebere Okpaleke
- Cardinal, Bishop of Ekwulobia
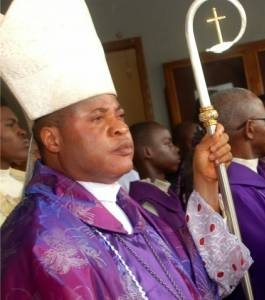
- Church: Roman Catholic Church
- Diocese: Ekwulobia
- See: Ekwulobia
- Appointed: 5 March 2020
- Installed: 29 April 2020
- Other post: Cardinal-Priest of Santi Martiri dell'Uganda a Poggio Ameno (2022–present)
- Previous post: Bishop of Ahiara (2012–2018)

Orders
- Ordination: 22 August 1990
- Consecration: 21 May 2013 by Anthony John Valentine Obinna
- Created cardinal: 27 August 2022 by Pope Francis
- Rank: Cardinal-Priest

Personal details
- Born: Peter Ebere Okpaleke; 1 March 1963 (age 63) Amesi, Anambra, Nigeria
- Motto: Veni Sancte Spiritus ("Come Holy Spirit")
- Coat of arms

Peter Ebere Okpaleke (born 1 March 1963) is a Nigerian prelate and cardinal of the Catholic Church who has been Bishop of Ekwulobia since 29 April 2020. He was appointed Bishop of Ahiara in 2012 and consecrated in 2013, but after the local clergy and laity insisted on an Mbaise bishop instead, he was installed as bishop of Ekwulobia. He was elevated to cardinal by Pope Francis on 27 August, 2022.

== Biography ==
=== Priesthood ===
Peter Ebere Okpaleke born on 1 March 1963 in Amesi in Anambra State, Nigeria. He attended local schools and in 1983 entered the Bigard Memorial Major Seminary in Ikot-Ekpene and Enugu, where he studied philosophy and theology from 1983 to 1992. He was ordained a priest of the Diocese of Awka on 22 August 1992.

In the twenty years following his ordination, he filled a wide variety of pastoral and administrative positions, including university chaplain, parish priest, diocesan finance administrator, diocesan chancellor, and secretary and member of diocesan boards. He also studied canon law in Rome at the Pontifical University of the Holy Cross.

=== Episcopacy ===
On 7 December 2012, Pope Benedict XVI appointed Okpaleke Bishop of Ahiara, Nigeria. Okpaleke was consecrated a bishop on 21 May 2013. Because of objections to his appointment, his consecration was held outside the Diocese, in the Major Seminary of Ulakwo in the Archdiocese of Owerri.

Local clergy and parishioners objected to his appointment and prevented him from entering the cathedral in order to take possession of the diocese. A petition objecting to the fact that Okpaleke was not of the area's Mbaise ethnic origin was sent to Pope Benedict after he appointed Okpaleke bishop. On 9 June 2017, Pope Francis gave clergy in the diocese 30 days to either write a letter promising obedience and accepting Okpaleke as their bishop or be suspended. Clergy sent letters of apology but continued to protest what they saw as racial discrimination.

On 19 February 2018, Pope Francis accepted Okpaleke's resignation as Bishop of Ahiara.

On 5 March 2020, just over two years after accepting his resignation as Bishop of Ahiara, Pope Francis appointed Okpaleke the Bishop of the Diocese of Ekwulobia, a newly created diocese in Anambra State which formerly had its territory under the jurisdiction of Awka Diocese. Okpaleke was installed there on 29 April 2020.

Pope Francis made him a cardinal on 27 August 2022, assigning him to the rank of Cardinal-Priest of Ss. Martiri dell’Uganda a Poggio Ameno. He participated as a cardinal elector in the 2025 papal conclave that elected Pope Leo XIV.

== See also ==
- Cardinals created by Pope Francis
