= Augustine Echema =

Nigerian Catholic prelate

Your Excellency Augustine Echema
- Bishop of Aba
- Church: Roman Catholic Church
- Diocese: Aba
- Appointed: 28 December 2019
- Installed: 13 February 2020
- Predecessor: Vincent Valentine Ezeonyia

Orders
- Ordination: 16 August 1986
- Consecration: 13 February 2020 by Antonio Guido Filipazzi

Personal details
- Born: Augustine Ndubueze Echema; 28 December 1958 (age 67) Ohuhu Nsulu, Abia State, Nigeria

Augustine Ndubueze Echema (born 28 December 1958) is a Nigerian Catholic prelate who has served as the bishop of the Diocese of Aba since 2019. He is a Professor of Liturgy at the Catholic Institute of West Africa (CIWA) in Port Harcourt, Rivers State, Nigeria.

== Biography ==
Echema attended St. Peter Claver Seminary, Okpala from 1972 to 1977. He studied philosophy from 1978 to 1982 and theology from 1982 to 1986 at Bigard Memorial Seminary (then at Ikot Ekpene).

Echema was ordained to the Catholic priesthood on 16 August 1986 for the Diocese of Owerri. He worked at St. Peter Claver Minor Seminary, Okpala as a formator from 1986 to 1988 and became a parish priest of St. Mark Parish in Umuneke Ngor from 1988 to 1989 when he left Nigeria for Germany to study at Philosophisch-Theologische Hochschule Sankt Georgen in Frankfurt. He obtained his doctorate degree in theology. Echema served as the parish priest of St. Joseph parish in Schwalbach from 1996 to 1998. Following his return to Nigeria, he became the deputy chaplain of CIWA and was appointed a professor of liturgy there.

On 28 December 2019, Pope Francis appointed Echema as the bishop of the Diocese of Aba. He was consecrated on 13 February 2020 by Archbishop Antonio Guido Filipazzi at the Christ the King Cathedral, Aba.
