= Michael Kalu Ukpong =

Nigerian Catholic prelate

- Bishop of Umuahia
- Church: Catholic Church
- Diocese: Diocese of Umuahia
- Appointed: 1 November 2022
- Predecessor: Lucius Iwejuru Ugorji
- Previous posts: Titular Bishop of Igilgili (2020-2022); Auxiliary Bishop of Umuahia (2020-2022)

Orders
- Ordination: 7 August 1993 by Lucius Iwejuru Ugorji
- Consecration: 30 July 2020 by Antonio Guido Filipazzi

Personal details
- Born: 15 December 1964 (age 61) Amaekpu Ohafia, Eastern Region, Nigeria

Michael Kalu Ukpong (born 15 December 1964) is a Nigerian Roman Catholic prelate who has served as the bishop of the Diocese of Umuahia since 2023.

== Biography ==
Michael Kalu Ukpong was born on 15 December 1964 in Amaekpu Ohafia, Abia State, Nigeria. He attended Immaculate Conception Minor Seminary in Ahiaeke from 1978 to 1984. He had his philosophy education at Seat of Wisdom Major Seminary, Owerri from 1985 to 1989 and his theological studies at St. Joseph Major Seminary, Ikot Ekpene from 1989 to 1993. He was ordained priest on 7 August 1993 by Bishop Lucius Iwejuru Ugorji for the Diocese of Umuahia. He became the parish vicar of St. Finbarr parish, Umuahia from 1993 to 1994 and the secretary to the bishop from 1994 to 1996. From 1996 to 2009, he was the pastor of St. John's parish in Item, Abia State and served as the editor of Lumen Newspaper from 1999 to 2001. From 2001 to 2003, he served as the Chaplain of the Christ the King Chaplaincy in Umudike. He left Nigeria for Germany to study canon law at the Klaus Mörsdorf Institute for Canon Law at LMU Munich in Germany from 2006 to 2007, and from 2008 to 2014, he had his doctorate at the University of Regensburg in Ratisbona. During his education, he served as the parish vicar of St. Joseph's parish in Reinhausen from 2008 to 2011; Assumption parish in Ascholtshausen from 2011 to 2013; Berathausen-Pfraundorf parish unit from 2013 to 2016. Returning to Nigeria, he led the Coronata High School in Asaga, Ohafia from 2016 to 2018. In 2018, he became the Chancellor of Umuahia diocese as well as the parish priest of St. Theresa's Parish in Umuahia.

He was appointed as the Titular bishop of Igilgili and auxiliary bishop of Umuahia by Pope Francis on 30 May 2020. He was consecrated by Archbishop Antonio Guido Filipazzi on 30 July 2020. On 1 November 2022 he was appointed as the bishop of Umuahia diocese by Pope Francis. He was installed on 2 February 2023 at Mater Dei Cathedral, Umuahia.
