= Diocese of Okigwe =

Roman Catholic diocese in Nigeria

Diocese of Okigwe Dioecesis Okigvensis

Location
- Country: Nigeria
- Territory: a portion of Imo State
- Ecclesiastical province: Owerri
- Metropolitan: Owerri
- Coordinates: 5°28′59″N 7°33′00″E

Statistics
- Area: 1,386 km^{2} (535 sq mi)
- Population: Total; Catholics: (as of 2022); 1,788,458; 948,229 (53%)
- Parishes: 126

Information
- Denomination: Roman Catholic
- Rite: Latin Rite
- Established: 24 January 1981
- Cathedral: Saint Mary's Cathedral in Okigwe
- Secular priests: 351 (337 diocesan, 14 religious)

Current leadership
- Pope: Leo XIV
- Bishop: Most Rev. Solomon Amanchukwu Amatu

Map
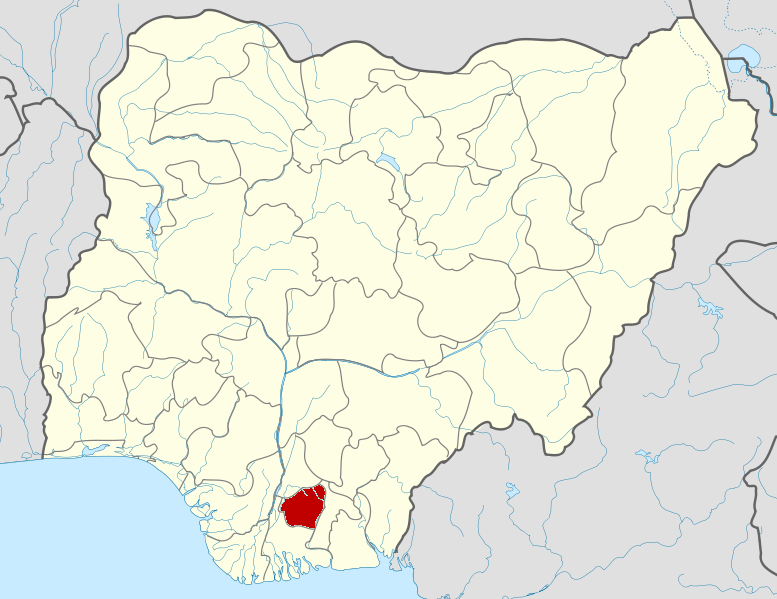
- Okigwe is located in Imo State shown in red.

Website
- www.okigwediocese.org

The Roman Catholic Diocese of Okigwe (Latin: Okigven(sis)) is a diocese located in the city of Okigwe, Imo State in the ecclesiastical province of Owerri in Nigeria.

As at 2016, the diocese has 43 missions, 219 lay religious (33 brothers, 186 sisters), and 198 seminarians.

== History ==
- January 24, 1981: Established as Diocese of Okigwe from the Diocese of Umuahia

== Special churches ==
The Cathedral is St. Mary's Cathedral in Okigwe.

== Leadership ==
- Bishops of Okigwe
  - Bishop Anthony Ekezia Ilonu (24 January 1981 – 22 April 2006)
  - Bishop Solomon Amanchukwu Amatu (since 22 April 2006)

== See also ==
- Roman Catholicism in Nigeria
