= Victor Adibe Chikwe =

Roman Catholic bishop

- Church: Mater Ecclesiae Cathedral
- Archdiocese: Owerri
- Province: Owerri Province
- Metropolis: Ahiara
- Diocese: Ahiara
- Appointed: November 18, 1987
- Term ended: September 16, 2010
- Predecessor: none
- Successor: none

Orders
- Ordination: January 6, 1988
- Consecration: by Pope John Paul II

Personal details
- Born: June 24, 1938
- Died: September 16, 2010 (aged 72) Ogbor Nguru Aboh Mbaise
- Denomination: Roman Catholic

Victor Adibe Chikwe (June 24, 1938 – September 16, 2010) was the Nigerian Roman Catholic prelate who was the first bishop of the Roman Catholic Diocese of Ahiara from his appointment on November 18, 1987, until his death on September 16, 2010. He was formally ordained bishop on January 6, 1988.
