= Chidozie Kennedy Ibeh =

Nigerian politician (born 1976)

Member of the Imo State House of Assembly
- Constituency: Obowo

Personal details
- Born: 25 June 1976 (age 50)
- Citizenship: Nigeria
- Party: All Progressive Congress
- Education: Enugu State University of Science and Technology, Abia State University
- Occupation: Politician, lawyer

Chidozie Kennedy Ibeh is a Nigerian politician and lawyer. He is a member of the Imo State House of Assembly representing Obowo state constituency.

== Early life and education ==
Chidozie Kennedy Ibeh was born on 25 June 1976. He completed his secondary education at ASCL Comprehensive Secondary School Kogi State before proceeding to bag a Bachelor of Laws (LL.B Hons) degree at Enugu State University of Science and Technology and a Master’s degree in Law (LL.M) from Abia State University, Uturu, Abia State.

== Political career ==
In 2010, he was elected councillor for Okenanlogho ward, in Imo State and as Leader of Obowo Legislative Council in 2011. In 2015, he represented Obowo constituency in the Imo State House of Assembly. He formerly served as a member of Transition Committee for Obowo Local Government Council, and Special Assistant to the Governor on Labour Matters.

He was a speaker of the Imo State House of Assembly under the All Progressives Congress until his resignation from the position in 2022.

== Religion ==
Kennedy is a Christian.
