= Lude Ahiara =

Town in Imo state, Nigeria

Lude Ahiara is a community in Ahiara Mbaise, in the Ahiazu Local Government Area of Mbaise, Imo State, Nigeria. The population is predominantly Catholic.

: 72
