= Mbaise =

LGA in Imo state, Nigeria

Mbaise is a region in Imo State in southeastern Nigeria. In the heart of Igboland, the region includes several towns and cities. The population is composed of indigenous clans, connected by intermarriage. With a population density of over 1,000 people per square kilometer, Mbaise is among West Africa's most densely populated areas; its 2006 population was 611,204.

The name "Mbaise" was derived from five clans: Agbaja, Ahiara, Ekwereazu, Ezi na Ihite and Oke Uvuru. The three local government areas of Mbaise cover about 404 km^{2} (156 sq mi); Aboh Mbaise covers 185 km^{2} (71 sq mi), Ahiazu Mbaise covers 111 km^{2} (43 sq mi), and Ezinihitte Mbaise covers 108 km^{2} (42 sq mi).

== History ==
Before Europeans arrived, the precolonial economy of the area was based on subsistence agriculture. Communities were protected from raids and other disturbances by the area's eastern flank along the Imo River, which borders Ezi na Ihite. Igbo government was based on kinship and customs, with the village group forming the highest level of organization. Chinua Achebe describes pre-colonial Igbo life in his novel, Things Fall Apart.

The area first came under British rule in 1902. When the British colonial administration initially imposed the Southern Protectorate of Nigeria, the new government established a post at Nguru in 1905 and built a residence for the British there. Around this time, Dr. Rogers Stewart, a British man who took a wrong turn on his bicycle, was captured and killed by indigenes in a case of mistaken identity. The British subsequently launched the 1906 Ahiara Punitive Expedition, led by Captains Brian Douglas and Harold Hastings, to begin reprisals in the region and enforce control.

To further supervise the clans, a native court was established in Obohia in 1907 and transferred to Nguru in 1909. However, in 1927, the colonial government introduced taxation, tax increases in 1929 were met with fierce opposition by the Igbo population, and the Women's War began in protest of social and economic oppression under British rule. The native court at Nguru was destroyed as a result of the Women's War. Regional courts were then established in Itu (for Ezinihitte); Afor Enyiogugu (for Agbaja); Obohia (for Ekwerazu); Orie-Ahiara (for Ahiara); and Uvuru (for Oke-Uvuru) in response to the home rule movement of the 1930s.

On June 12, 1941, Mbaise became a political and administrative federation of five clans: Agbaja, Ekwerazu, Ahiara, Ezinihitte, and Oke-Uvuru. A treasury was opened in Enyiogugu in 1942, later transferred to Aboh in 1948. Councils were formed by 1945, loosely based on autonomous communities that already existed, and it was from these councils that the three local governments of Mbaise were created. Ahiazu Mbaise was a merger of the Ahiara and Ekwerazu councils, and Aboh Mbaise was a merger of the Oke-Ovoro and Agbaja councils. Ezinihitte Mbaise remained by itself except for Obiangwu and Umuohiagu, two small villages which joined the Ngor-Okpala from the Agbaja region.

Between 1955 and 1958, the Mbaise County Council began landmark development projects, such as the Mbaise Secondary School and Mbaise Joint Hospital (now General Hospital) which are both in Aboh.

On June 1, 1969, Mbaise was one of the last remaining Igbo strongholds during the Biafran War and Ahiara Mbaise was the site from which General Chukwuemeka Odumegwu Ojukwu delivered the historic Ahiara Declaration.

== Culture and demographics ==
The people are predominantly Igbo. About 55 percent are Catholics, 35 percent are Protestants, and other religions make up the remainder. Some cultural and traditional ceremonies have survived Western influence. The eight-day Ahianjoku festival honored the yam deity; since 1946, the annual August 15 new-yam festival has been a Christian version of the Ahianjoku festival. Oji Ezinihitte celebrates the Ezinihitte on January 1 each year. Itu Aka, before the farming season, encourages the people to weather the environment, modernity, and new challenges. A local salad, ugba, is served with raffia wine.

Mbaise women are celebrated for their fertility. To be an eghu ukwu, a woman must bear at least 10 children; some women have given birth to as many as 15. The Iri Ji Mbaise festival is observed by the Mbaise people every year on August 15th.

Mbaise culture is rich in music and Igbo dance. Music is played on the wood xylophone, hand piano, long short and slit drums, pots, gongs, bamboo horn and calabash. There are dances for childbirth, marriage, funerals, communal labor, and other social occasions. The agbacha ekurunwa dance is performed for childbirth, and alija and ogbongelenge are performed for marriage. Eseike, esse, ekwerikwe mgba and nkwa Ike are performed at funerals of men, and uko and Ekereavu for funerals of women. D. I. Nwoga, who brought an abigbo group to the United States during the 1980s, wrote that the musicians and dancers philosophize, criticize, admonish and praise with their performances.

== Climate ==
Tropical weather prevails in Mbaise. The region has notable precipitation levels for most months in a given year. There is, however, a short time frame that is characterised by aridity. The predominant climate in this area falls under the Köppen-Geiger classification and is designated as Am. According to the information available, the average annual temperature in Mbaise is 25.9 °C (78.6 °F). Here, there is roughly 2,412 millimetres (95 inches) of precipitation per year.

== Notable people ==
- Emeka Ihedioha, Nigerian politician and former Governor of Imo State.
- Sir Warrior, Nigerian Igbo highlife musician, guitarist and band leader.
- Genevieve Nnaji, Nigerian actress, producer and director.
- Rita Dominic, Nigerian actress and producer.
- Eberechi Eze, English professional footballer.
- Kanayo O. Kanayo, Nigerian actor and lawyer.
- Victor Osuagwu, Nigerian actor.
- Tchidi Chikere, Nigerian film director, producer, scriptwriter, actor, music video director and singer.
- Okey Bakassi, Nigerian stand-up comedian and actor.
- Eucharia Anuobi, Nigerian actress, producer, and pastor.
- Oby Kechere, Nigerian actress and film director.
- Mike Godson, Nigerian actor.
- Chioma Ajunwa, Nigerian former track, field athlete and football player.
- Ngozi Eucharia Uche, former Nigerian football player and a former head coach of the Nigeria women's national football team.
- Anthony Obinna, First black man to serve as branch president of the church of Jesus Christ.
- Chinwe Obaji, Nigerian former minister.
- Chris Anyanwu, Nigerian politician.
- Viola Onwuliri, Nigerian former minister.
- Sylvester Ugoh, Nigerian former minister.
- Fabian Osuji, Nigerian former minister.
- Kaycee Madu, Nigerian-Canadian politician.
- Jennifer Echegini, Nigerian-Dutch footballer.
- Emmanuel Ekwueme, Footballer.
- Uru Eke, Actress.
- Kaodirichi Akobundu-Ehiogu, Basketballer.
- Osita Henry Chikere, Footballer.
- Martins Ekwueme, Footballer.
- Benedict Akwuegbu, Footballer.
- Patrick Ekeji, Footballer and sports administrator.
- Uche Kalu, Footballer.
- Chizaram Ezenwata, Footballer.
- Anthony Uzodimma, Footballer.
- Oby Kechere, Actress and director.
- Dickson Iroegbu, Film director.
- Ike Iroegbu, Nigerian-American basketball player.
- Donatus Nwoga, Nigerian professor of African literature.
- Mary Odili, Retired Nigerian Justice.
- Celestine Onwuliri, Nigerian academician.
- Matthew Nwogu, Nigerian politician and lawyer.
- Victor Adibe Chikwe, Roman Catholic Bishop.
- Emeka Chinedu, Nigerian politician.
- Joseph Ahaneku, Former Vice Chancellor of Nnamdi Azikiwe University.

== Sources and further reading ==
- Agulanna, E. C. (2008). The Mbaiseness of Mbaise (2nd ed.). Owerri, Nigeria: Career Publishers.
- Njoku, C. A. C (2003). History and Culture of Mbaise from Earliest Times to AD 2001. Owerri, Nigeria: Celaju.
- Nwoga, D. I. (1978). "Culture and Religion in Contemporary Mbaise". In T. U. Nwala (ed.). Mbaise in Contemporary Nigeria. New York: Gold and Maestro.
- Njoku, G. (1978) "Mbais in Pre-colonial and Colonial Nigeria" in T. U. Nwala (ed.), Mbaise in Contemporary Nigeria. New York: Gold & Maestro.
- Achebe, Chinua. Things Fall Apart. New York: Anchor Books, 1994. ISBN 0385474547
