= Igbokwe =

Igbokwe is a surname. Notable people with the surname include:

- Cheta Igbokwe, Nigerian playwright
- Christy Essien-Igbokwe (1960–2011), Nigerian actress and musician
- Miracle Igbokwe (born 1995), Nigerian pilot, model and TV personality
- Obi Igbokwe, American sprinter
- Pearlena Igbokwe, Nigerian-American television executive
- Raphael Nnanna Igbokwe, Nigerian politician
