= Emeka Chinedu =

Nigerian politician

Member of the House of Representatives of Nigeria, 9th & 10th Assembly from Imo
- Incumbent
- Assumed office June 2019
- Preceded by: Raphael Nnanna Igbokwe
- Constituency: Ahiazu Mbaise/Ezinihitte

Personal details
- Citizenship: Nigeria
- Party: Peoples Democratic Party
- Occupation: Politician
- Committees: Deputy Chairman House Committee on Federal Capital Territory (10th Assembly)

Emeka Martins Chinedu is a Nigerian politician. He is currently a member representing Ahiazu Mbaise/Ezinihitte Federal Constituency in the House of Representatives. He serves as Deputy Chairman on the House Committee on the Federal Capital Territory (FCT) in the 10th assembly.

== Political career ==
He was first elected to the 9th Assembly in 2019 on the platform of the Peoples Democratic Party (PDP). At the 2023 House of Representatives elections, he contested again on the same party ticket (PDP) to win a second term as a member representing Ahiazu Mbaise/Ezinihitte Federal Constituency. As of 5 December 2024, he has sponsored four bills which have passed their first reading in the National Assembly. He is currently serving as the Deputy Chairman, House Committee on the Federal Capital Territory (FCT).

== Legal challenge and victory ==
On 7 September 2023, an Appeal Court sitting in Lagos affirmed Emeka Chinedu's victory at the polls, thereby dismissing the appeals of Darlington Amaechi of Labour Party (LP) and Nnanna Igbokwe of the All Progressive Congress (APC), on the grounds that it lacked merit and jurisdiction. Earlier in 2019, The Election Petitions Tribunal sitting in Owerri dismissed the petition filed by Nnanna Igbokwe of the All Progressives Congress (APC) against Emeka Chinedu for Ezinihitte Mbaise/Ahiazu Mbaise federal constituency elections, on grounds that it lacked merit.
