= Innocent Anyanwu =

Dutch boxer (born 1982)

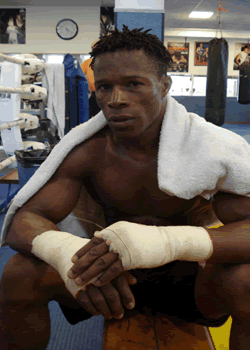

Personal information
- Nationality: (Netherlands) Dutch / (Nigeria) Nigerian
- Born: Innocent Anyanwu; 25 September 1982 (age 43) Ekwerazu, Nigeria
- Weight: Super Featherweight

Boxing career
- Stance: Orthodox

Boxing record
- Total fights: 73
- Wins: 73
- Win by KO: 73
- Losses: 8
- Draws: 3

Innocent Anyanwu // (born 25 September 1982) is a Dutch professional boxer from Amsterdam, Netherlands. He currently holds the Dutch and BeNeLux Super Featherweight titles.

== Biography ==
Innocent Anyanwu was born in Ekwerazu, Imo State, Nigeria. When he was 13 his mother died and Innocent quit school. Shortly thereafter he started to work as a car mechanic in his brother's garage. However, he had a dream to practise sports in Germany, even though he did not know which sport. He left Nigeria when he was 16 and went to Cameroon without a passport because he did not have one. Since Cameroon is a French-speaking country, the language barrier proved a problem. Still, after that, he went to another French-speaking country, Gabon, where a brother of his was living. Through German tourists, Innocent learned that he needed several visas in order to compete in sports there. Since he did not have a passport, Innocent never went to Europe.

== Professional career ==
Innocent started his boxing career in Amsterdam, Netherlands in 2001. After promising his trainer Martin Jansen total dedication to the sport, an intense training regime started and the cooperation continued until today. After three months, Innocent participated in his first boxing match which he won. The victory parade of Innocent continued through the amateur ranks in national and international boxing matches in The Netherlands. Innocent fought against boxers from not only the Netherlands but also from Belgium, Russia and Germany. With only 3 losses (early in his boxing career) in 36 contests, and many wins by (T)KO, Innocent wanted to represent the Netherlands at the Olympics in Athens but was denied because he did not hold Dutch nationality. Innocent then went back to his native country Nigeria where he captured the national amateur title and Champion of Champions trophy at super-featherweight. That enabled Innocent to return to the Netherlands and reunite in 2005 with his longtime boxing trainer Martin Jansen to continue his professional boxing career.

In 2005, Innocent made his pro debut. He fought 20 times up to October 2009 in and outside the Netherlands and never lost a fight. He captured the Dutch national and smaller European (BeNeLux) crown. Innocent's goal is to support his people in Ekwerazu, Nigeria through his boxing career. His results as a sportsman and social human being were awarded by the Dutch Queen with a Dutch passport (with a radio chip and coil), which enables him to participate on short notice in a European championship fight.

== Professional boxing record ==
22 Wins (13 KO), 13 Loss (4 KO), 3 Draws
Result	Record	Opponent		Date	Location	Notes
Loss	11-5-1	(Belgium) Ahmed El Hamwi	UD 8	2014-02-01	Ingelmunster, Belgium
Loss	20-0-0	(Finland) Edis Tatli	KO 5	2013-08-17	Savonlinna, Finland
Loss	13-0-0	(Belgium) Steve Jamoye	UD 8	2013-06-29	Liege, Belgium
Draw	6-0-1	(Belgium) Arnaud Dimidschtein	MD 8	2013-03-23	Hainaut, Belgium
Loss	9-2-0	(Tunisia) Hedi Slimani	UD 8	2013-02-02	Ingelmunster, Belgium
Loss	25-0-1	(Belgium) Jean Pierre Bauwens	UD 8	2012-02-18	Izegem, Belgium
Loss	24-23-3	(Spain) Ruddy Encarnacion	UD 8	2012-10-15	Amsterdam, Netherlands
Loss	25-2-0	(Wales) Gary Buckland	PTS 8	2012-07-21	Wales, United Kingdom
Loss	21-8-2	(Canada) Arash Usmanee	UD 8	2012-02-18	Quebec, Canada
Loss	23-4-0	(Italy) Ermano Fegatilli	UD 8	2011-12-23	Liege, Belgium
Loss	22-22-3	(Spain) Ruddy Encarnacion	TKO 8	2011-11-11	Antwerp, Belgium
Win	2-24-0	(Belgium) Pascal Bouchez	UD 6	2010-05-16	Amsterdam, Netherlands
Loss	21-8-2	(Portugal) Antonio João Bento	KO10	2010-05-16	Hilversum, Netherlands	Vacant EBA super featherweight title
Win	0-8-0	(Germany) Tahir Celic	RTD 4	2009-11-28	(Netherlands) Hoyer's Gym, Heerlen
Win	21-3-0	(Spain) Sergio Palomo	TKO 3	2009-10-26	(Netherlands) Carré, Amsterdam
Win	14–3-0	(Belgium) Herve De Luca	TKO 3	2009-04-19	(Netherlands) Bussum
Draw	14–4-0	(Armenia) Hovhannes Zhamkochyan	MD 10	2008-12-25	(Belgium) Izegem, West-Vlaanderen	BeNeLux lightweight title
Win	7–2-0	(Armenia) Karen Boyadjyan	TKO 6	2008-11-01	(Belgium) Izegem, West-Vlaanderen	Defended BeNeLux super featherweight title
Win	10–3-0	(France) Mhand Boukedim	TKO 6	2008-10-13	(Netherlands) Carré, Amsterdam
Win	4–4-1	(Netherlands) Nico Schroeder	TKO 3	2008-09-20	(Netherlands) Rotterdam
Win	6–32-0	(Czech Republic) Zsolt Botos	KO 3	2008-05-12	(Belgium) Deinze, East Flanders
Win	0–12-0	(Belgium) Pascal Bouchez	UD 6	2008-04-19	(Netherlands) Rotterdam
Win	9–2-0	(Czech Republic) Araik Sachbazjan	UD 10	2008-04-13	(Netherlands) The Hague	Won vacant Dutch super featherweight title
Win	0–4-0	(Romania) Felician Trif	TKO 2	2008-02-17	(Netherlands) The Hague
Win	5–9-0	(Belgium) Younes Amrani	UD 8	2007-06-09	(Belgium) Antwerp
Win	9–0-1	(Belgium) Herve De Luca	KO 7	2007-05-01	(Belgium) Bruges, West Flanders	Won vacant BeNeLux super featherweight title
Win	5–10-0	(Slovakia) Lubos Priehradnik	PTS 8	2006-12-16	(Belgium) Brussels
Win	9–40-0	(Hungary) Bela Sandor	PTS 6	2006-09-30	(Netherlands) Stadskanaal
Win	1–10-0	(Czech Republic) Josef Holub	KO 5	2006-05-20	(Netherlands) Purmerend	Holub not able to beat the count after a body-shot. No suspension required by the doctor.
Draw	4-4-2	(Armenia) Erik Nazarian	PTS 8	2006-05-01	(Belgium) Bruges, West Flanders
Win	0–5-0	(Czech Republic) Zsolt Botos	PTS 6	2006-09-30	(Netherlands) Barneveld
Win	0–1-0	(Czech Republic) Josef Holub	PTS 4	2006-02-25	(Netherlands) Spakenburg	Referee: Hennie De Rijk 40-37
Win	3–0	(Romania) Daniel Chitu	TKO 3	2005-11-12	(Netherlands) Helmond
Win	2–0	(Netherlands) Chad Bisschop	PTS 6	2005-11-12	(Netherlands) Amersfoort	Referee: Hennie De Rijk 59-56
Win	0-1–0	(Czech Republic) Tomas Berki	TKO 2 (4)	2005-10-01	(Netherlands) Hilversum
