= Diocese of Ahiara =

Catholic diocese in Nigeria

Diocese of Ahiara Dioecesis Ahiarana

Location
- Country: Nigeria
- Territory: Mbaise, Imo State
- Ecclesiastical province: Owerri
- Coordinates: 5°31′40.2″N 7°16′23.9″E

Statistics
- Area: 425 km^{2} (164 sq mi)
- Population: Total; Catholics: (as of 2022); 656,471; 457,969 (69.8%)
- Parishes: 84

Information
- Denomination: Catholic Church
- Sui iuris church: Latin Church
- Rite: Roman Rite
- Established: 18 November 1987
- Cathedral: Mater Ecclesiae Cathedral
- Secular priests: 193

Current leadership
- Pope: Leo XIV
- Bishop: Simeon Okezuo Nwobi, CMF

Map
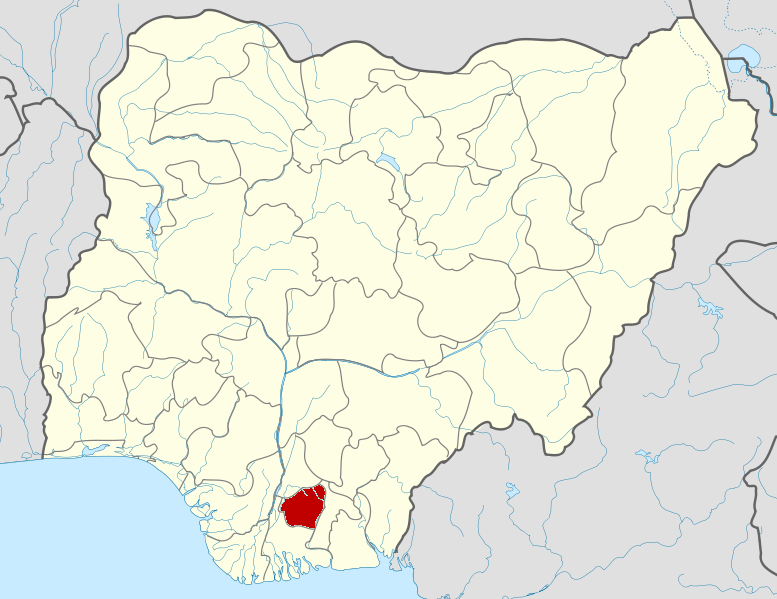
- Ahiara is in Imo State which is shown in red.

Website
- AhiaraDiocese.org

The Diocese of Ahiara (Latin: Ahiaran(a)) is a Latin Church ecclesiastical territory or diocese of the Catholic Church located in Ahiara in the region of Mbaise in Imo State, Nigeria. It is a suffragan diocese in the ecclesiastical province of the metropolitan Archdiocese of Owerri.

== History ==
- 18 November 1987: Established as Diocese of Ahiara from the Diocese of Owerri

== Appointment controversy 2012-2018 ==
The clergy and laity of the diocese refused to accept the bishop Pope Benedict XVI had appointed in 2012 as their ordinary, Peter Ebere Okpaleke, because he was not of the Mbaise ethnic group or chosen from among the local priests. Okpaleke was consecrated a bishop on 21 May 2013, but he was not installed in Ahiara.

On 3 July 2013, Pope Francis appointed Cardinal John Onaiyekan, Archbishop of Abuja, as Apostolic Administrator.

On 8 June 2017, Pope Francis, after receiving a delegation from the Diocese, gave all the diocesan priests and deacons 30 days to personally write to the Vatican pledging obedience to the pope and accepting Okpaleke. Those who failed to write would be suspended a divinis, which would prohibit a priest or deacon from administering the sacraments, save for a priest hearing the confession of a person in danger of death, and would be removed from their posts. He had considered suppressing the diocese, but decided against that. On 8 July, it was reported that while the letter of apology was sent, Okpalaeke's appointment was still rejected by the local priests who insisted that the Holy See was enforcing racial discrimination in the country by hiring outsider priests to become bishops.

On 22 July 2017, Pope Francis agreed to respond through emissaries to the individual priests protesting Okpaleke's appointment.

On 14 February 2018, Okpaleke submitted his resignation to Cardinal Fernando Filoni, Prefect of the Congregation for the Evangelisation of Peoples, and Archbishop Antonio Guido Filipazzi, Apostolic Nuncio to Nigeria. He wrote: "I do not think that my apostolate in a diocese where a group of priests and lay faithful are very ill disposed to have me in their midst would be effective." Pope Francis accepted Okpaleke's resignation on 19 February 2018, and appointed Okpaleke bishop of the newly created Diocese of Ekwulobia on 5 March 2020. Okpaleke was installed in that position in April of the same year.

== Special churches ==
- The cathedral is Mater Ecclesiae Cathedral in the episcopal see of Ahiara.

== Leadership ==
=== Bishops ===
- Victor Adibe Chikwe (18 November 1987 – 16 September 2010)
- Peter Okpaleke (7 December 2012 – 19 February 2018), who did not take possession
- Simeon Okezuo Nwobi C.M.F. (3 May 2024 – present)

=== Auxiliary bishops ===
- Simeon Okezuo Nwobi, C.M.F. (14 October 2023 – 3 May 2024)

=== Apostolic Administrators ===
- John Onaiyekan (3 July 2013 – 19 February 2018)
- Lucius Iwejuru Ugorji (19 February 2018 – 6 March 2023), appointed Metropolitan Archbishop of the Roman Catholic Archdiocese of Owerri in Owerri, Nigeria by Pope Francis, but he remains as interim apostolic administrator (Note: Sede vacante et ad nutum Sanctae Sedis (Latin for 'Sit vacant and at the behest of the Holy See'))

== See also ==
- Catholic Church in Nigeria
