= Okwuohia =

Village in Imo state, Nigeria

Coordinates: 05°35′56″N 07°20′10″E

Okwuohia is one of the 14 villages of Obowo, Imo State, Nigeria.

== History ==
During the colonial era, the British established an oil mill in Okwuohia to take advantage of the abundant local water resources in order to harvest palm extract. Due to the huge demand for palm oil, the mill generated significant profits. Palm oil was exported to Europe and around the world for the production of finished goods, such as soap and candles, which helped the local economy.

The British also introduced the customary-court system, with warrant chiefs who dispensed tribal justice.

== Culture ==
The community's traditional celebrations include the Iwa Akwa Festival (Initiation Into Manhood) and the African Folk Music Festival Mbom-Uzo. The community has three market days: Nkwo Okwuohia, eke Okwuohia, and Orie Okwuohia, all of which serve as an economic "coming together" for the community with commodities, especially farm produce, on display for purchase.

== See also ==
- Imo State
- Nigeria
