= Okigwe =

LGA in Imo state, Nigeria

- LGA and town
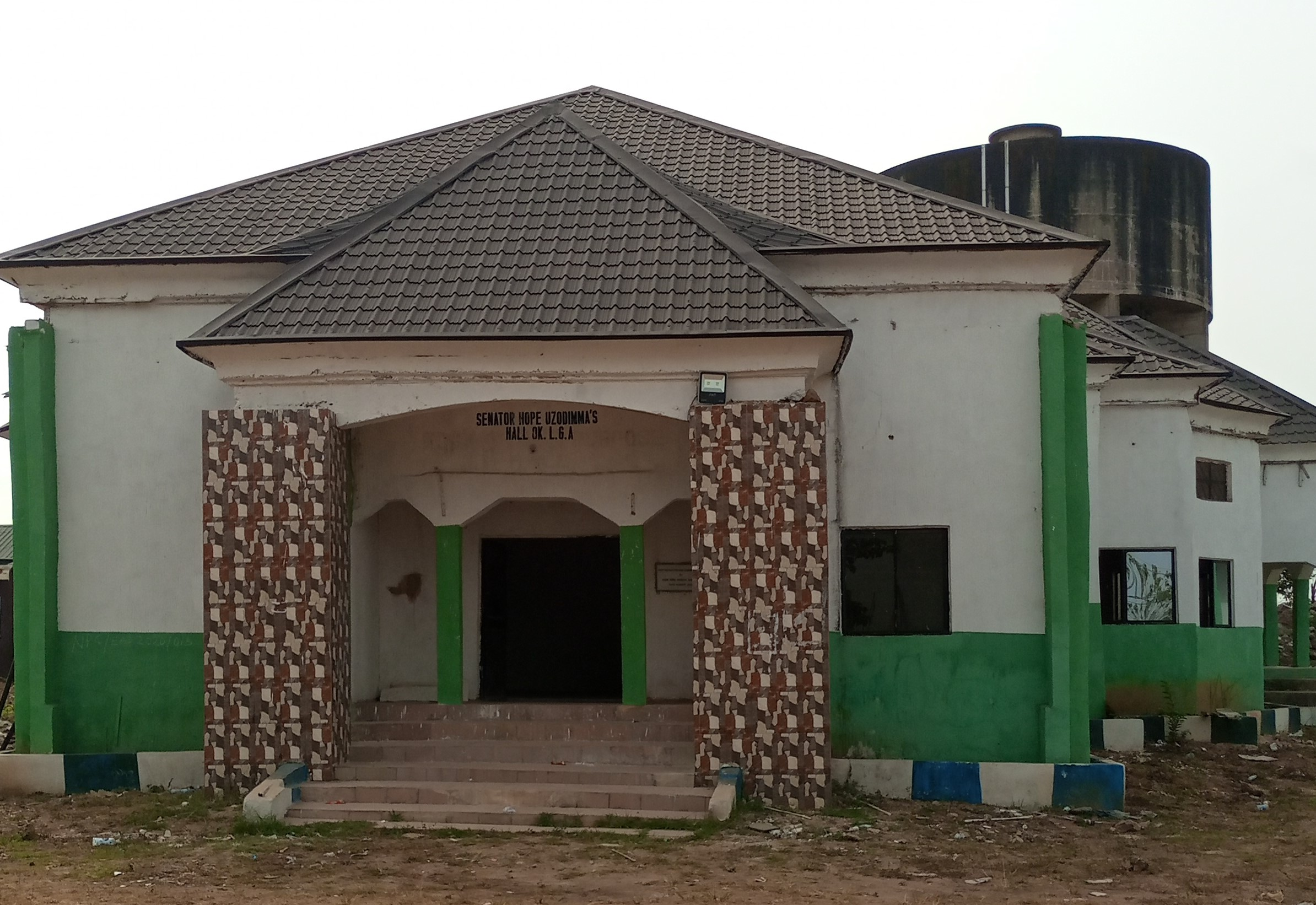
- Senator Hope Uzodimma's Hall, Okigwe Local Government Headquarters
- Motto: The Land Of Peace
- Interactive map of Okigwe
- Location in Nigeria
- Coordinates: 5.483°N 7.55°E
- Country: Nigeria
- State: Imo State

Government
  - Local Government Chairman: Nkechi Mbonu

Population (2005)
  - Total: 132,237
- Time zone: UTC+1 (WAT)
- National language: Igbo

Okigwe is the third largest city in Imo state in Nigeria after Owerri and Orlu. Okigwe is located in the Okigwe Local Government Area (LGA) of Nigeria. The city lies between the Port Harcourt-Enugu-Maiduguri rail line, being the nearest city to the biggest cattle market in Nigeria located in the Umu Nneochi Area of Abia state. Thus, the city has grown into a major cattle transit town for the South-East and South subregions of Nigeria. Okigwe has a population of 132,237 (2005 census). Most of the population is made up of immigrant workers from other states. Okigwe city was the primary host site of the old Imo State University (now Abia State University). Okigwe has various tourist and historical sites. Okigwe remains one of the breadbaskets of Nigeria with terrace cultivation practised on its hilly farmlands. St. Mary's Cathedral in Okigwe is the seat of the Roman Catholic Diocese of Okigwe. In 2016, the Imo state government recommissioned a new cattle market in the city in respect to the previous one that has been relocated to Abia.

== Autonomous communities and villages ==
Okigwe has six autonomous communities with different villages (in bracket) namely;

- Ezinachi (Ndiohia, Umudiaba, Amukwa, Amorie, Umuokparaoba, Amajarata, Obiohia, Umudo, Ndi Ngeleogwe, Umuebiri, Ubahu, Ajanumuna, Amachi, Umuike, Amachara, Umuoma, Umunuma, Umuoho, Uhugbuala/Ndizorie, Ovoro/Umuagu),
- Ikigwu (Aro-ubaha, Aro-Okigwe, Ope, Ubanaka, Umuka, Umuokpara),
- Otanzu (Amaeze-Ogii, Umuawa-Ogee, Umualumoke, Amuro (Amuro, Aro-Amuro),
- Umulolo (Agbobu, Agbuala, Aku/Ihette, Aku/Ikenga, Amaosu, Amasator, Aro-Agbobu, Aro-Umulolo West, Aro-Umulolo East, Ibinta, Ndi-Oji, Ndi-Okoroji, Okanachi, Umuawa-Ibu)
- Ihube (Agbala, Akpugo, Amagu, Amalator, Amano, Nkoto, Ogube, Ozara)
- Otan-Chara (Alaike-Ogwaku, Alaocha-Igwaku, Ihitte-Isiokwe, Ikenga, Ikenga-Isiokwe, umuinem, umuzegem, Umueze, Umukeoke).

== Agriculture and soil ==
The soil is predominantly partly red clay and black or dark brown. The major crops grown in the district on its hilly farmlands are palm trees (palm oil and palm wine), cassava, and vegetables.

== Climate ==
Rarely falling below 14 °C (58 °F) or rising beyond 32 °C (90 °F), the weather is consistently warm throughout the year. The wet season is partially gloomy and humid.

== See also ==
- Roman Catholic Diocese of Okigwe
