= Ermano Fegatilli =

Belgian boxer (born 1984)

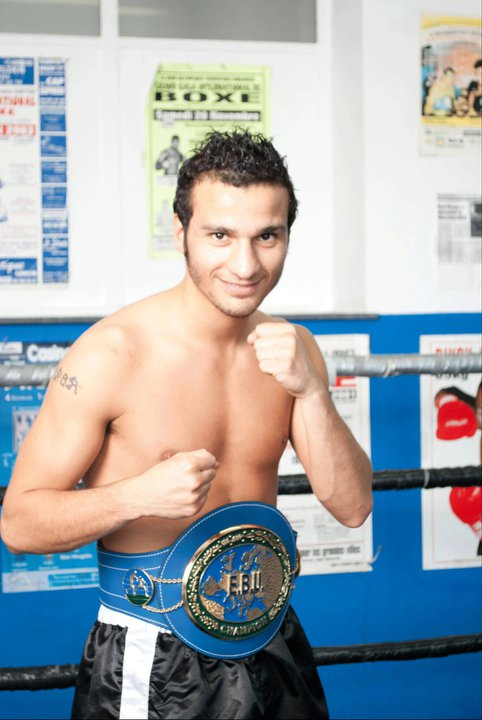

Personal information
- Nickname: Il Dottore
- Nationality: (Belgium) Belgian (Italy) Italian
- Born: 19 August 1984 (age 42)
- Weight: Super Featherweight

Boxing career
- Stance: Orthodox

Boxing record
- Total fights: 36
- Wins: 30
- Win by KO: 8
- Losses: 5
- Draws: 1
- No contests: 0

Ermano Fegatilli (born 19 August 1984) is a Netherlands-based Italian boxer. He is the former European Boxing Union Super Featherweight champion.

== Personal life ==
Fegatilli combines work and boxing and is currently a full-time employee as a healthcare project consultant at the Möbius Business Redesign.

== Boxing career ==
=== Amateur career ===
Fegatilli's amateur career was a rather short one, finishing at 25-2-2 and becoming Belgian champ in four consecutive years since 2001.

=== Professional career ===
Fegatilli started his professional career in 2005. He is the Belgian Champion since 2008. In May 2007 he won the European Boxing Union European Union (EBU-EU) Super Featherweight title against Italian champion Antonio De Vitis.

As of February 2012 Fegatilli is ranked #9 by the WBC. and is therefore official title challenger for both the WBC and WBA world titles.

Fegatilli is being promoted by GMG Boxing Promotion and managed by Mirco Giuliani.

His trainers are Martin Jansen (head trainer/coach and cutman), Sandro Menconi (co-trainer), Urbano Giuliani and Dimitrios Mevroudis.

=== Winning the EBU Super Featherweight Championship ===
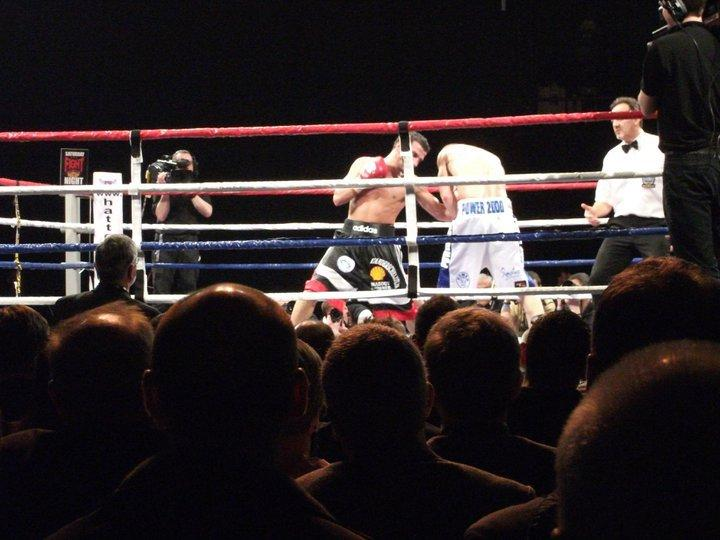
Fegatilli vs Foster Jr.

On 26 February 2011 Fegatilli won the EBU Super Featherweight Title by beating Stephen Foster Jr., 30, in the Premier Suite at Bolton’s Reebok Stadium, England, United Kingdom. This was Fegatilli's biggest win to date. Foster Jr. was knocked down a total of five times yet lasted to the final bell. Relatively unknown and a 13-2 underdog before this fight, Il Dottore surprised many with the result.

Final scores were 140-110 and 114-109 twice, making Fegatilli the winner by unanimous decision. Foster was knocked down once in round nine, three times in round 10 and once more in round 11. Foster Jr. gave a good account of himself in the first seven rounds but Fegatilli's consistent body attack and high workrate proved to be too much for Foster Jr, who had stopped Levan Kirakosyan in three rounds in October 2010.

=== First title defense ===
Fegatilli was set to make a voluntary defense of his European title against tough Frenchmen and EBU-EU super featherweight champion Karim Chakim in October but French promoter Gilbert Tesseron cancelled the fight just four days before it was to take place because of financial reasons.

Ermano defended his EBU title on 25 February against Italian Antonio De Vitis in the latter one's hometown of Savigliano, Italy. Fegatilli remained on the attack in a technically thrilling bout. A cut on the head of De Vitis caused a stoppage in round 6. Fegatilli won a close-but-clear majority decision.

=== Non-title fight ===
Because of the cancellation of the fight against Chakim Fegatilli's management was forced to organize a bout to keep Ermano's high world rank spot secured.

On 23 December 2011 Fegatilli faced Dutch-Nigerian boxer Innocent Anyanwu in Liege, Belgium. Ermano won the fight by unanimous decision.

=== Losing his title ===
On 21 July 2012 Fegatilli lost his title in a close and questionable decision to Italy's Devis Boschiero.

The fight was very close and entertaining to watch but on the scorecards but all three judges scored the contest for the local challenger Boschiero. Many people protested for a rematch.

=== Comeback ===
On 28 September 2012 Fegatilli returned home to Ghent to face journeyman Michael Isaac Carrero.

He dominated the overmatched Michael Carrero over eight rounds quite clearly winning a near-shutout Unanimous Decision.

=== Karim Chakim trilogy ===
On 29 March 2013 Ermano Fegatilli once again fought at the Topsportal - This time with vengeance in mind. In a trilogy fight with past rival Karim Chakim, Ermano Fegatilli fought past the French veteran in a highly impressive 80-72 victory. This fight sparked him back into Super Featherweight title contention.

== Professional boxing record ==
25 Wins (5 knockouts, 20 decisions), 4 Losses (0 knockouts, 4 decisions), 0 Draws
Res.	Record	Opponent	Type	Rd., Time	Date	Location	Notes
Win	25-4	(Italy) Antonio De Vitis	TD	7 (12)	2012-02-25	Bocciodromo, Savigliano, Italy	Retained EBU Super Featherweight Title
Win	24-4	(Netherlands) Innocent Anyanwu	UD	8	2011-12-23	Salle Omnisport, Oupeye, Belgium	
Win	23-4	(England) Stephen Foster	UD	12	2011-02-26	Reebok Stadium, Bolton, England	Won EBU Super Featherweight Title
Win	22-4	(Belgium) Pascal Bouchez	UD	6	2010-04-17	Deux Acren, Lessines, Belgium	
Win	21-4	(Poland) Maurycy Gojko	UD	6	2010-02-20	Salle de la Prehalle, Herstal, Belgium	
Win	20-4	(Morocco) Samir Boukrara	UD	6	2009-11-28	Salle Omnisport, Oupeye, Belgium	
Win	19-4	(France) Alix Djavoiev	UD	6	2009-11-01	Stedelijke Sporthalle, Izegem, Belgium	
Win	18-4	(Poland) Maurycy Gojok	UD	4	2009-10-10	Salle Omnisport, Cheratte, Belgium	
Win	17-4	(Spain) Jesus Garcia Escalona	UD	8	2009-05-09	Hall Omnisport, Loncin, Belgium	
Win	16-4	(Belgium) Pascal Bouchez	TKO	3 (6)	2009-02-21	Hall Omnisport de Herstal, Herstal, Belgium	
Win	15-4	(Slovakia) Ivan Godor	UD	6	2008-11-22	Vise, Belgium	
Loss	14-4	(Germany) Vitali Tajbert	UD	8	2008-08-29	Burg-Waechter Castello, Düsseldorf, Germany	
Win	14-3	(Czech Republic) Araik Sachbazjan	UD	10	2008-05-30	Vise, Belgium	Won vacant Belgium Super Featherweight Title
Win	13-3	(Armenia) Gagik Martirosyan	UD	10	2008-02-23	Herstal, Belgium	Won TWBA Super Featherweight Title
Loss	12-3	(Spain) Jesus Garcia Escalona	SD	12	2007-11-17	Complexe Sportif, Andenne, Belgium	Lost EBU-EU Super Featherweight Title
Win	12-2	(Belgium) Pascal Bouchez	PTS	6	2007-09-29	Centre Sportif, Soumagne, Belgium	
Win	11-2	(Italy) Antonio De Vitis	MD	12	2007-05-05	Sart Tilman, Liege, Belgium	Won vacant EBU-EU Super Featherweight Title
Win	10-2	(Romania) Andrei Florin	KO	1 (6)	2007-02-24	Herstal, Belgium	
Loss	9-2	(Italy) Devis Boschiero	UD	10	2006-12-17	Battaglia Terme, Padua, Italy	For vacant IBF Youth Super Featherweight Title
Win	9-1	(Slovakia) Elemir Rafael	TKO	5 (6)	2006-10-21	Complexe Sportif de la Spetz, Arlon, Belgium	
Win	8-1	(France) Karim Chakim	UD	8	2006-05-27	Salle Omnisports, Vise, Belgium	
Loss	7-1	(France) Karim Chakim	PTS	6	2006-04-08	Flemalle, Belgium	
Win	7-0	(Slovakia) Robert Zsemberi	TKO	1 (6)	2006-02-25	Herstal, Belgium	
Win	6-0	(France) Kamel Guerfi	PTS	8	2005-12-02	Dudelange, Luxembourg	
Win	5-0	(Romania) Andrei Florin	UD	4	2005-11-26	Verviers, Belgium	
Win	4-0	(Belgium) Miloud Saadi	PTS	4	2005-10-22	Arlon, Belgium	
Win	3-0	(Poland) Piotr Niesporek	TKO	3 (4)	2005-09-30	Amay, Belgium	
Win	2-0	(Poland) Damian Lawniczak	UD	4	2005-05-21	Vise, Belgium	
Win	1-0	(Russia) Sergey Babushkin	PTS	4	2005-04-23	Salle La Ruche, Herstal, Belgium	Fegatilli's professional debut

== See also ==
- British Scene: Stephen Foster vs Ermano Fegatilli Preview
- List of European Boxing Union super featherweight champions
