= Santi Martiri dell'Uganda a Poggio Ameno =

- Church of the Holy Ugandan Martyrs at Poggio Ameno
- Chiesa Santissimi Martiri dell'Uganda a Poggio Ameno
- Click on the map for a fullscreen view
- 41°50′43″N 12°29′24″E
- Location: Via Adolfo Rava 31, Rome
- Country: Italy
- Language: Italian
- Denomination: Catholic
- Tradition: Roman Rite
- Website: www.facebook.com/Parrocchia-Santi-Martiri-dellUganda-103783384584998/

History
- Status: titular church
- Dedication: Uganda Martyrs
- Consecrated: 1980

Architecture
- Architect(s): Giuseppe Vaccaro and Gualtiero Gualtieri
- Architectural type: Modern
- Groundbreaking: 1973
- Completed: 1980

Administration
- Diocese: Rome

Santi Martiri dell'Uganda a Poggio Ameno is a 20th-century parochial church and titular church in Rome, dedicated to the Uganda Martyrs.

== History ==
The church was built in 1973–1980. Its roof is curved like a Ugandan hut.

On 28 June 1988, it was made a titular church to be held by a cardinal-priest.

Titulars

- Christian Tumi (1988–2021)
- Peter Okpaleke (2022–present)
