= Diocese of Aba =

Roman Catholic diocese in Nigeria

Diocese of Aba Dioecesis Abana

Location
- Country: Nigeria
- Territory: Abia State
- Ecclesiastical province: Owerri
- Metropolitan: Owerri
- Coordinates: 5°31′34″N 7°29′22″E Umuahia

Statistics
- Area: 2,494 km^{2} (963 sq mi)
- Population: Total; Catholics: (as of 2022); 1,345,630; 647,102 (48.1%)
- Parishes: 96

Information
- Denomination: Roman Catholic
- Rite: Latin Rite
- Established: 2 April 1990
- Cathedral: Christ the King Cathedral in Aba
- Patron: Christ the King
- Secular priests: 265

Current leadership
- Pope: Leo XIV
- Bishop: Bishop Augustine Ndubueze Echema

Map
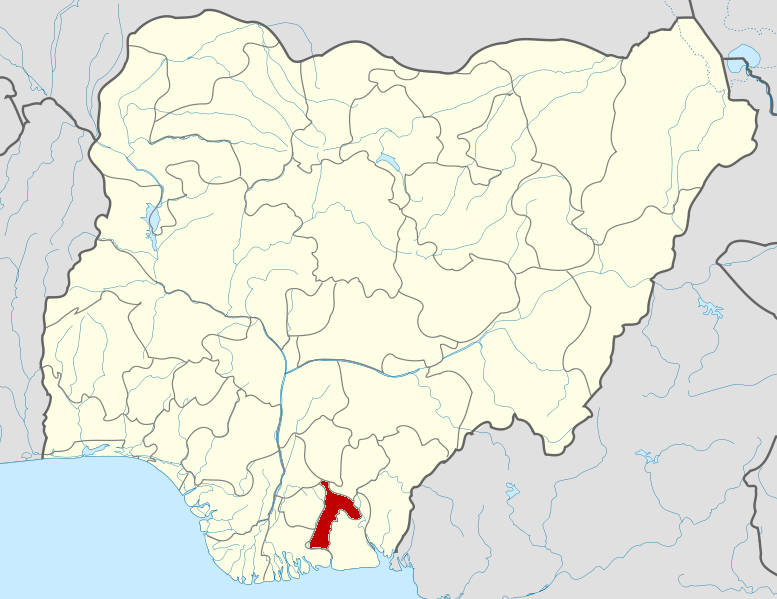
- The cathedral is in Aba which is located in Abia State shown here in red.

Website
- Profile

The Roman Catholic Diocese of Aba takes its name from the major commercial city of Aba in Abia State, Nigeria. Aba Diocese was created from Umuahia Diocese on April 2, 1990. Its first diocesan bishop, Vincent Valentine Ezeonyia, CSSp, was installed on 2 July 1990 at Christ the King Church; he was ordained bishop on 1 July 1990 at Mater Dei Cathedral in Umuahia. At the time the Catholic Diocese of Aba was created, there were 24 parishes, 33 Indigenous priests, including those born and bred in Aba, many religious people, and a Catholic population of 227,225. The bulk of the Catholic population was concentrated in Aba Urban and its immediate environs. Ezeonyia died in 2015.

In July 1990 Vincent Valentine Ezeonyia, C.S.Sp. took over the administration of the Catholic Diocese of Aba. At some time after he took over the diocese had 144 priests, with 59 parishes, with several men in seminaries, and women in convents.

The bishop has built many primary and secondary schools. The Diocese has a hospital (St Joseph's Catholic Hospital, Ohabiam, Aba) and some Health Centres/Maternities.

In 2000 the Diocese celebrated its tenth anniversary. The bishop of the diocese, Vincent Valentine Ezeonyia, the clergy and lay faithful held a diocesan "Synod for True Christian Identity", holding sessions in 2001.

== Bishops ==
- Bishop Vincent Valentine Ezeonyia, CSSp (from 1990; died 2015)
- Bishop Augustine Ndubueze Echema

=== Other priests of this diocese who became bishop ===
- Fortunatus Nwachukwu, appointed nuncio and titular archbishop in 2012.
