= Diocese of Umuahia =

Roman Catholic diocese in Nigeria

Diocese of Umuahia Dioecesis Umuahiana

Location
- Country: Nigeria
- Metropolitan: Onitsha

Statistics
- Area: 2,460 km^{2} (950 sq mi)
- Population: Total; Catholics: (as of 2021); 1,474,000; 274,000 (18.6%)
- Parishes: 72

Information
- Rite: Latin Rite
- Cathedral: Mater Dei Cathedral
- Secular priests: 161

Current leadership
- Pope: Leo XIV
- Bishop: Michael Kalu Ukpong

The Roman Catholic Diocese of Umuahia (Latin: Umuahian(a)) is a diocese located in the city of Umuahia. It was part of the Old Ecclesiastical Province of Onitsha, but presently, it belongs to the ecclesiastical province of Owerri, in Nigeria, which was erected on 26 March 1994.

== History ==
On 23 June 1958, the diocese was established as the Diocese of Umuahia, separated from the Diocese of Owerri. In 1981 and 1990, two younger dioceses, Okigwe and Aba, were carved out of the old Umuahia diocese.

The Cathedral is Mater Dei Cathedral in Umuahia, dedicated on 8 December 2000.

== Bishops ==
- Bishops of Umuahia (Roman rite)
  - Bishop Anthony Gogo Nwedo, C.S.Sp. (19 February 1959 – 2 April 1990)
  - Bishop Lucius Iwejuru Ugorji (2 April 1990 – 6 March 2022)

=== Auxiliary Bishop ===
- Michael Kalu Ukpong (2020–)

=== Other priests of this diocese who became bishops ===
- Anthony Ekezia Ilonu, appointed Bishop of Okigwe in 1981
- Fortunatus Nwachukwu (priest here, 1984–1990), appointed nuncio and titular archbishop in 2012
- Gregory Obinna Ochiagha, appointed Bishop of Orlu in 1980
- Mark Onwuha Unegbu, appointed Bishop of Owerri in 1970

== See also ==
- Roman Catholicism in Nigeria

== Sources ==
- GCatholic.org
- Catholic Hierarchy
