= Oru na Nneude =

Village in Imo state, Nigeria

Oru na Nneude (alternately Oru na Lude) is a village in Ahiara, Imo State, Nigeria. It was divided into two sections, Oru and Nneude, by the late 1950s.
