= Vincent Valentine Ezeonyia =

Vincent Valentine Eguchukwu Ezeonyia C.S.Sp.
- Bishop of Aba
- Church: Catholic Church
- Diocese: Diocese of Aba
- In office: 20 April 1990 – 8 February 2015
- Predecessor: Diocese erected
- Successor: Augustine Echema

Orders
- Ordination: 3 August 1968
- Consecration: 1 July 1990 by Paul Fouad Tabet

Personal details
- Born: 5 April 1941 Uke, Southern Nigeria, Colony and Protectorate of Nigeria, British Empire
- Died: 8 February 2015 (aged 73)

Vincent Valentine Eguchukwu Ezeonyia (5 April 1941 – 8 February 2015) was a Roman Catholic bishop.

Ordained to the priesthood in 1968, Ezeonyia was appointed the first bishop of the Roman Catholic Diocese of Aba, Nigeria in 1990. He died while still in office.
