= Tisedi =

Diocesal city in Algeria

Tisedi was an ancient city and episcopal see, which remains a Latin Church titular see within the Catholic Church.

== History ==
Tisedi, located near modern Aziz-Ben-Tellis in present Algeria, was one of many towns in the Roman province of Numidia which was important enough to become a suffragan bishopric but faded completely.

Three of its residential bishops are recorded (although author Morcelli assigns them to Tiddi):

- Donatus I suffered gravely, according to Saint Optatus (bishop of Milevis), under the heresy Donatism and was deprived of his see in 362 by their bishop Felix of Idicra
- The Council of Carthage (484), called by Huneric of the Vandal Kingdom, was attended for Tisedi by both a Catholic bishop Lampadius, who was banished afterwards, and his Donatist counterpart, Donatus.

== Titular see ==
The diocese was nominally restored in 1933 as the Latin Church titular see of Tisedi (Latin)/Tisedi (Curiate Italian)/Tiseditanus (Latin adjective).

It has had the following incumbents, so far of the fitting Episcopal (lowest) rank:

- Joseph Kilasara, Holy Ghost Fathers (C.S.Sp.) (1966.11.03 – death 1978.11.21), as emeritate, formerly Bishop of Roman Catholic Diocese of Moshi (Tanzania) (1960.01.12 – 1966.11.03)
- Jorge Ardila Serrano (1980.10.27 – 1988.05.21) as Auxiliary Bishop of Archdiocese of Bogotá (Colombia) (1980.10.27 – 1988.05.21); later Bishop of Girardot (Colombia) (1988.05.21 – retired 2001.06.15), died 2010
- Luis Gutiérrez Martín, Claretians (C.M.F.) (1988.09.15 – 1995.05.12) as Auxiliary Bishop of Archdiocese of Madrid (Spain) (1988.09.15 – 1995.05.12), Bishop of Segovia (Spain) (1995.05.12 – retired 2007.11.03), died 2016
- Neil E. Willard (1995.06.27 – death 1998.03.25) as Auxiliary Bishop of Archdiocese of Montreal (Quebec, Canada) (1995.06.27 – 1998.03.25)
- Gerhard Feige (1999.07.19 – 2005.02.23) as Auxiliary Bishop of Magdeburg (Germany) (1999.07.19 – 2005.02.23), next succeeded as Bishop of Magdeburg (2005.02.23 – ...)
- Marian Rojek (2005.12.21 – 2012.06.30) as Auxiliary Bishop of Archdiocese of Przemyśl (Poland) (2005.12.21 – 2012.06.30); later Bishop of Zamość-Lubaczów (Poland) (2012.06.30 – ...)
- Gustavo Alejandro Montini (2014.02.14 – 2016.12.16) as Auxiliary Bishop of Diocese of San Roque de Presidencia Roque Sáenz Peña (Argentina) (2014.02.14 – 2016.12.16); later Bishop of Santo Tomé (Argentina) (2016.12.16 – ...)
- Horst Eberlein (2017.02.09 – ...), Auxiliary Bishop of Archdiocese of Hamburg (Germany), no previous prelature.

== See also ==
- List of Catholic dioceses in Algeria

== Sources and references ==
- GCatholic - data for all sections

Bibliography

- J. Mesnage, L'Afrique chrétienne, Paris 1912, pp. 433–434
- H. Jaubert, Anciens évêchés et ruines chrétiennes de la Numidie et de la Sitifienne, in Recueil des Notices et Mémoires de la Société archéologique de Constantine, vol. 46, 1913, p. 95
