= Nnarambia =

Settlement in Nigeria

Coordinates: 5°31′25″N 7°15′55″E

Nnarambia is a town in Ahiara, Imo state, Nigeria.
