= Oby Kechere =

Nigerian actress and film director (died 2026)

- Died: 27 April 2026
- Other name: Ms Koi Koi
- Citizenship: Nigerian
- Occupations: Actress, film producer, director
- Years active: 2001–2026

Oby Cecilia Kechere (//; died 27 April 2026), popularly known as Ms Koi Koi, was a Nigerian actress and film director. She came from Mbaise in Imo State, Nigeria.

Kechere joined the Nigerian film industry, otherwise called Nollywood, in 2001, first-starring in the popular August-Meeting films. She died after a prolonged illness on 27 April 2026.
