= Matthew Nwogu =

Nigerian politician and lawyer

Member of the House of Representatives of Nigeria from Imo

Right Honorable
- Constituency: Aboh Mbaise/Ngor Okpala Federal Constituency
- Incumbent
- Assumed office June 2023

Personal details
- Born: 24 December 1960 (age 65)
- Occupation: Politician, lawyer

Matthew Nwogu (born 24 December 1960) is a Nigerian politician who is currently serving as a member representing Aboh Mbaise/Ngor okpala Federal Constituency in the House of Representatives of Imo State.

== Political career ==
In 2023, he was elected under the platform of the Labour Party to represent Aboh Mbaise/Ngor Okpala Federal Constituency in the House of Representatives, while defeating close rivals, Mr. Akwitti Ifeanyi Godwin of the All Progressives Congress (APC) and Mr. Agulanna Albert Chibuzor of the Peoples Democratic Party (PDP).

== Legal challenge and victory ==
At the Imo State National and State Assembly Election Petitions Tribunal, the APC candidate, Mr. Akwitti Chibuzor was not satisfied with the Labour Party lawmaker's victory and took the case to the Tribunal and Appeal court. In November, 2023 Hon. Justice Gumel dismissed the case and announced Mathew Nwogu as the winner.
