= Tiddis =

Roman city and bishopric in modern Algeria

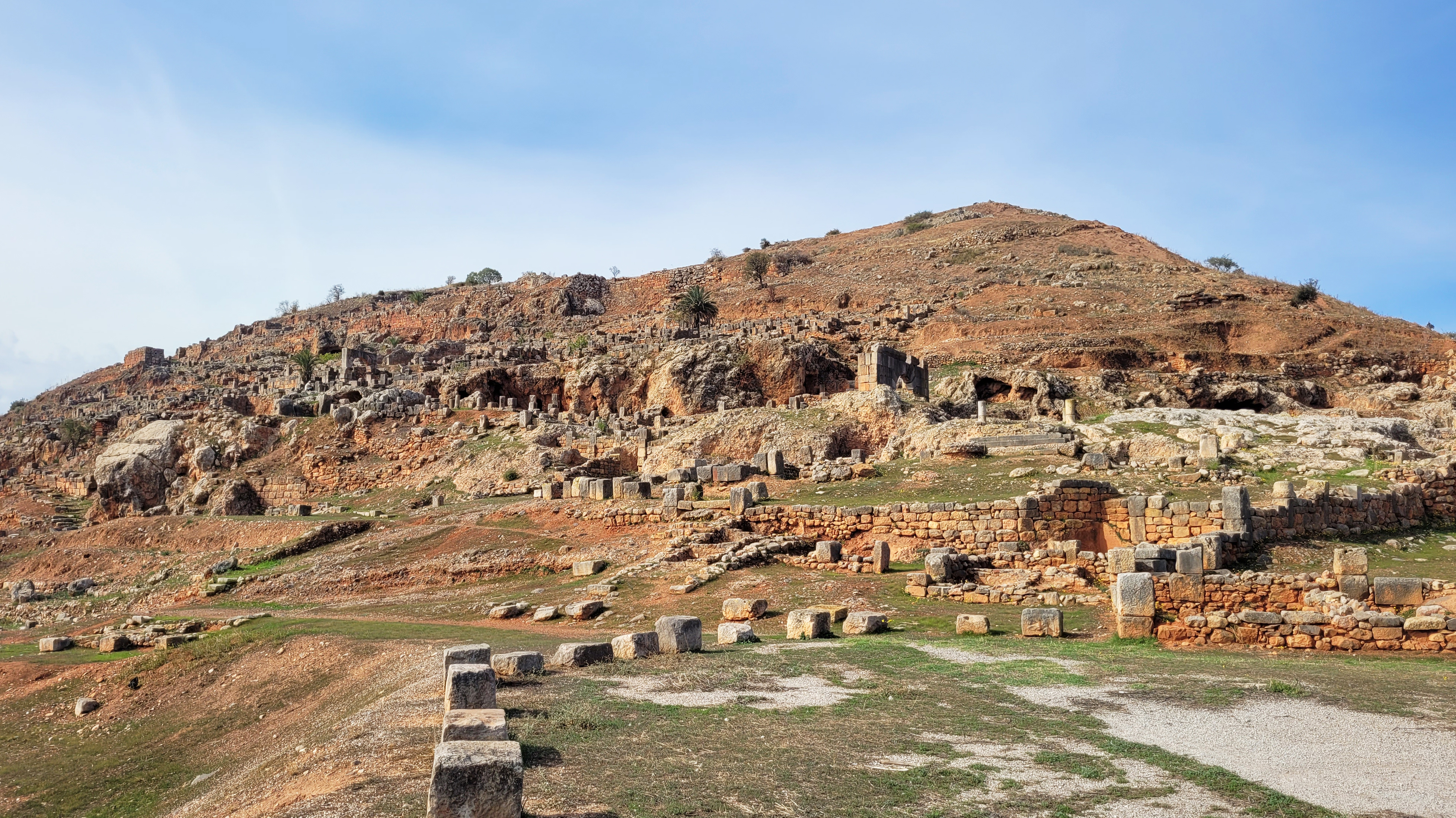
- Ruins of Tiddis

- Location within Algeria
- 36.463333°N 6.483889°E
- Location: Algeria
- Region: Constantine Province

Tiddis (also known as Castellum Tidditanorum or Tiddi) was a Roman city that depended on Cirta and a bishopric as "Tiddi", which remains a Latin Catholic titular see.

It was located on the territory of the current commune of Béni Hamidane in the Constantine Province of eastern Algeria.

== History ==
Tiddis was built by the Romans as a "vicus" & defensive castellum of the Confederatio Cirtense, initially administered by Cirta's Roman colonists and successively arranged according to their system of urbanization.

This prosperous town, established on a plateau, had a monumental gate, baths, industrial facilities (tanneries), a sanctuary to Mithras dating back to the 4th century BC, and also a Christian chapel.

The native town became Romanized just like the other towns near Cirta. Today one can cross it by following the main street as it goes from a monumental portal up between the houses, passing by the forum, a small square, and the curia. From inscriptions one knows the magistrates and decurions of the castellum. It belonged to the colony of Cirta and, with the other colonies of Rusicade, Milev and Chullu, formed part of the confederation of the IV colonies. Also among the public monuments cleared thus far are the public baths and cisterns (built by M. Cocceius Anicius Faustus in the middle of the 3d c. A.D.) and on top of the crag a Temple of Saturn (which produced a great number of stelae now in the Constantine Museum). On the slopes of the cliff one can see many houses and the remains of the original rampart of the castellum. The Lollii were one of the important families of the town. Their circular mausoleum can still be seen some kilometers to the N. The monument was erected by Lollius Urbicus, prefect of the city of Rome under Antoninus Pius. At the end of the 5th c. the town is known to have been the seat of a bishopric. Two Christian basilicas have been cleared. One was located at the entrance of the town; the other was in a more distant district and has been only partially cleared.

Castles and water tanks of all forms remind us that the city has gradually been abandoned because it lacked sources. One can admire the mausoleum that Quintus Lollius Urbicus built, a native of Tiddis (and son of a romanised Berber landowner) who then became prefect of Rome.

The local romance speaking community probably disappeared with the Arab conquest in the second half of the 7th century, but some pottery remains showed the survival of a small village -with some christian inhabitants- inside the ruins of Tiddis until the XI century.

Today, Tiddis is an authentic Roman site called Res eddar or the "peak of the House" located in the Gorge of the Khreneg, just north of Cirta. It marks the presence of a Roman civilization through rock art inscriptions and Roman pottery.

== Ecclesiastical history ==
Under Byzantine control, Castellum Tidditanorum had two small churches and was the see of a diocese.

Four bishops are assigned by Morcelli to this see, but Mesnage and Jaubert believe they were bishops of Tisedi, leaving only

- Abundius, attending the Council of Carthage called in 484 by king Huneric of the Vandal Kingdom, afterwards exiled like most Catholics, unlike their Donatist schismatic heretic-counterparts.

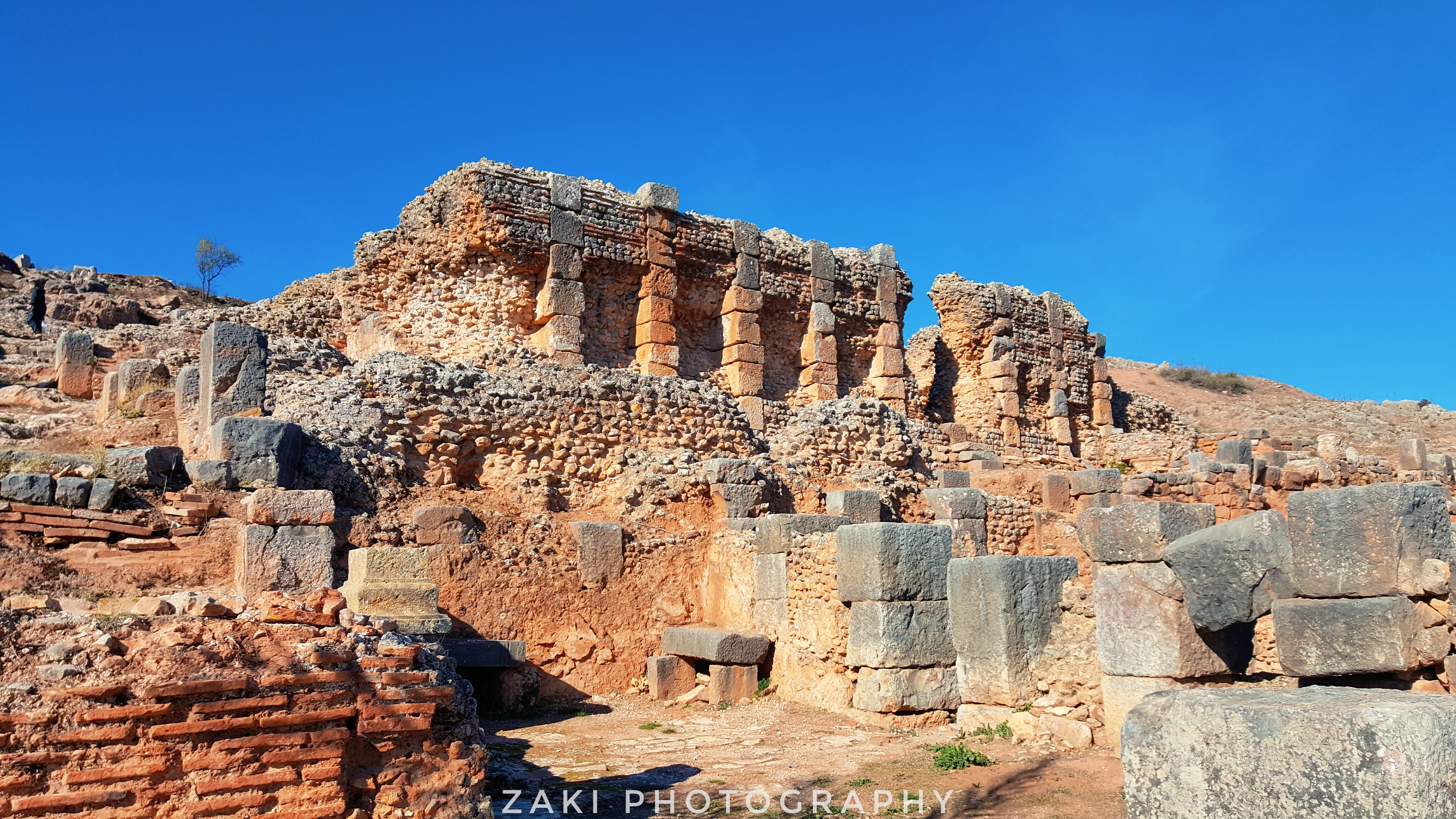
Ruins of Tiddis

=== Titular see ===
In 1925 was established the "Titular Episcopal See of Tiddis"

- Titular Bishop. Titular Archbishop (1985.09.14 – ...): Archbishop Eugenio Sbarbaro
- Former Titular Bishops. Titular Bishop: Bishop Cesar Benedetti, O.F.M. (1951.02.08 – 1983.04.04); Titular Bishop: Bishop Joseph Brendan Whelan, C.S.Sp. (1948.02.12 – 1950.04.18); Titular Bishop: Archbishop Mečislovas Reinys (1926.04.05 – 1940.07.18)

== Famous locals ==
- Quintus Lollius Urbicus
- Lollia (gens)

== See also ==
- List of Catholic dioceses in Algeria
- Confederatio Cirtense
- Cirta

== Sources and external links ==
- GCatholic - Tiddi

== Bibliography ==
- André Berthier Tiddis. Antique Castellum Tidditanorum Academie des Belles lettres. Paris, 1951
- Bonifacius Gams, Series episcoporum Ecclesiae Catholicae, Leipzig 1931, p. 469
- Stefano Antonio Morcelli, Africa christiana, Volume I, Brescia 1816, pp. 320–321
- J. Mesnage, L'Afrique chrétienne, Paris 1912, p. 315
- H. Jaubert, Anciens évêchés et ruines chrétiennes de la Numidie et de la Sitifienne, in Recueil des Notices et Mémoires de la Société archéologique de Constantine, vol. 46, 1913, p. 93
