= Obodo =

Village in Imo state, Nigeria

Obodo Ahiara is the oldest village in Ahiara city, in Imo State, Nigeria. It comprises eight hamlets, namely:

- Ahiarama
- Umuehi
- Umuakali
- Umuakwali
- Umuobinaugwu
- Umuoleru
- Umuokoro
- Umuotunwanyi
