= Fabian Ihekweme =

Politician

Dr. Fabian Chijiogu Ihekweme (born 4 March 1969) is a Nigerian politician born in Obowo Local Government Area, Imo State, Nigeria into the family of Chief and Mrs. Sabastine Ihekweme. He currently serves as the Imo State Commissioner of Foreign and International Affairs under the government of Hope Uzodinma

== Early life and education ==
Ihekweme was born on 4 March 1969 in Obowo, Imo State, Nigeria. He studied Political Science at the University of Madras, India, where he obtained bachelor's and master's degrees. He later earned a doctorate from the University of Hamburg, Germany.

== Political career ==
Ihekweme is a Nigerian politician who served as Commissioner for Foreign and International Affairs in Imo State under Governor Hope Uzodinma. He was appointed commissioner in March 2020 as part of the state executive council. Before his appointment, he had been involved in public service and political activities in Imo State. During his time as Commissioner, Ihekweme was responsible for foreign and international affairs in the Imo State Government. After leaving office, he made public comments on issues relating to the Imo State Government in 2024.
