= Otulu, Oru West =

Town in Nigeria

Otulu is a town in Oru West local government area of Imo State, Nigeria. It is located along the Owerri-Onitsha Federal Highway (which is identified as Highway A6 by Google map) in Imo State. Approaching from Owerri to Onitsha one will get to Awo-Omanma, Amiri and then Otulu after which one has Mgbidi; while from Onitsha to Owerri one has Otulu after Mgbidi.

== History ==
The name Otulu is derived from two Igbo words 'Otu' which means 'One' and 'Olu' which means 'voice', put together it means 'one voice'. The father of Otulu is Igbo n'abunkwu. He originated from Nri in Anambra State. Therefore the community is known as Otulu Igbo n'abunkwu. When Igbo n'abunkwu started expanding, he and some other immigrants of his community chose the name Otulu "one voice" which signifies unity that is 'let us be united'.

According to Chief E. Ndubuisi, Otulu married two wives, the first wife was Lolo Ogueri Ukwu and the second wife was Lolo Oji. The first wife had two children namely Umuhu and Umuezem. The second wife had three children namely Ubahawa, Okponsu and Umuojienwe. Umuhu is the first son of Otulu, Umuezem is the second son, Ubahawa is the third son, Okponsu is the fourth son and Umuojienwe is the last son. Umuhu had three children they are Umunkwa, Umudurukwu and Umuofia. Umuhu made the first community, Umuezem also made his own community with his five sons namely Umuochihe, Umuelile, Umunka, Umuaro and Umuaso. Ubahawa made his own community with his six sons they are Umuokwa, Umunabia, Umudikwa, Ubahawa Oji, Umuabuba, Umuosunkita including his two brothers Okponsu and Umuojienwe. These made up the sixteen villages in Otulu. Otulu had initially one autonomous community with the sixteen villages but the creation of autonomous community in Imo State in the year 2003 brought about the division of the town Otulu into two different autonomous communities such that each autonomous community is headed by a traditional ruler. This is to say that Umuhu and Umuezem autonomous communities were created from the then Otulu autonomous community with the Imo State of Nigeria official gazette No. 4 Vol 28 of 29 October 2003. The Umuhu and Umuezem autonomous communities are made up of eight villages namely Umuofia, Umunka, Umuelile, Umudurukwu, Umuaro, Umuochihe, and Umuaso. While Otulu autonomous community is left with the remaining eight villages namely Umuokwa, Ubahawa Oji, Umudikwa, Umuabuba, Umunabia, Umuosonkita, Okposu and Umuojienwe.

Otulu has two traditional rulers namely Obi of Otulu in the person of HRH Eze Festus I. Orji and Igwe of Otulu in the person of HRH Eze Sunday B. Nnabue; ruling Otulu autonomous community and Umuhu/Umuezem autonomous communities respectively.

== Demographics ==
Otulu has a population of about 20,028 people. It has two autonomous communities: Ubahawa and Umuhu/Umuezem.

Ubahawa has the following villages:

1. Umundikwa
2. Umunnabe
3. Ubahawa-ocha
4. Ubahawa-oji
5. Nkponsu
6. Umuabuba
7. Umuosonkita
8. Umuojienwe

While Umuhu/Umuezem has:

1. Umunkwa
2. Umudurukwu
3. Umuofia
4. Umuochoihe
5. Umunka
6. Umuelile
7. Umuaro
8. Umuaso

Most people in the town are Christians roughly split between the Anglican Church and the Roman Catholic Church. There is a huge following of Anglicanism amongst the natives of Ubahawa with the St. Stephen's Anglican Church serving as a local church as well as an archdeaconry. The Anglican church also has some few worshipers from Umuhu and Umuezem, as well as from the non-indigenes. The St. Stephen's Anglican Church, Otulu was originally established in 1914 by the Christian Missionary Society (CMS).

The Roman Catholic historically has been dominant in Umuhu and Umuezem, although it also has a sizeable following in Ubahawa. St. Christopher's Catholic Church was established in Ubahawa in the 1990s.

Before the advent of Christianity, Otulu people like many other African communities are deeply involved in their native beliefs and village deities such as Ogwugwu, Obana and Ala Umuhu. Back then, every family compound has a corner set apart for their family deity, and the head (father) of the family would offers sacrifice regularly on behalf of his family and for other needs. The chief priest does the same for the whole community. But with the advent of Christianity, Otulu now have just very few or no families who still retain this practice.

== Education ==
There is one secondary school in Otulu, which is called Otulu Secondary Commercial School. It was built by the people in the early 1980s. There are two government-owned primary schools namely Community Primary School Otulu and Progressive Central School Otulu.

== Economy ==
Otulu has two market squares called Afor Otulu and Orie Otulu situated at Ubahawa and Umuhu/Umuezem respectively.

The town benefits hugely from being on the Onitsha-Owerri highway, as such a lot of shops and businesses typically tend to be sited along this highway. There used to be a few manufacturing facilities located in the town in the 1990s and early 2000s, but not any more.

== Climate ==
Otulu, is 15.97 metres (52.4 feet) above sea level, has tropical wet and dry climate. The district's annual temperature is -0.15% below Nigeria's average, at 29.31 °C (84.76 °F). The Town usually experiences 303.09 wet days (83.04% of the time) and 247.17 millimetres (9.73 inches) of precipitation each year.

== Tourism ==
There are various cultural festivals which the Otulu people are known for, such festivals includes Owu festival, Ogugu festival, which between June and July of every year, Iri-ji (New yam festival) which is conducted mainly by the traditional rulers.

August Meeting is a yearly event held by Otulu women in the month of August.

The Obana (masquerade) festival takes place in October and November every year.

The Christmas and New Year holidays are big events in Otulu. Indigenous Otuluers, as well as Otulu natives who are resident in other parts of the world, typically travel back home to Otulu with their family to spend the time with their other relatives and friends. There are football tournaments and several outdoor parties such as wedding ceremonies and age-grade activities during this festive season.
