= Iri Ji Mbaise =

Festival in Nigeria

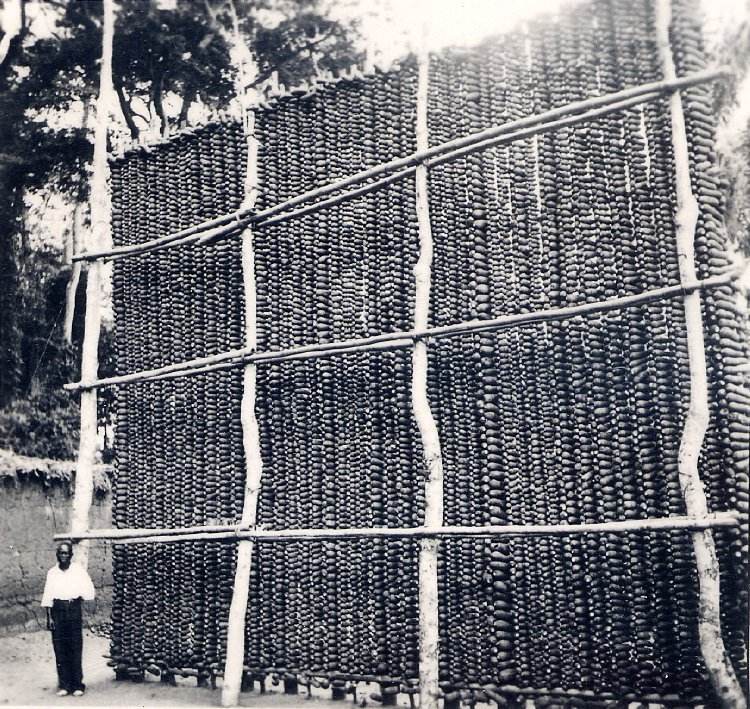
Igbo man with stored yams

Iri Ji Mbaise (The eating of New Yam Festival in Mbaise), also known as New Yam Festival of Mbaise is the annual New Yam festival celebrated by the Mbaise people of Imo State, Nigeria. Held annually on August 15, it is one of the most important cultural events in Imo State and Igboland.
