= Emmanuel Ekwueme =

Nigerian footballer (born 1979)

Personal information
- Date of birth: 22 November 1979 (age 46)
- Place of birth: Mbaise, Nigeria
- Height: 1.77 m (5 ft 10 in)
- Position: Midfielder

Senior career*
Years	Team	Apps	(Gls)
1996–1997	NEPA Lagos		
1997–1999	Jasper United FC		
1999–2003	Polonia Warsaw	75	(2)
2002	→ Widzew Łódź (loan)	7	(2)
2003–2004	Wisła Płock	21	(1)
2004–2005	Aris Saloniki	8	(1)
2005–2006	AS Veria	18	(0)
2007	Unia Janikowo	0	(0)
2007–2008	Warta Poznań	6	(0)
2008–2009	Znicz Pruszków	41	(0)
2010–2015	LZS Piotrówka		

International career
2003–2004	Nigeria	14	(0)
- * Club domestic league appearances and goals

Emmanuel Ekwueme // (born 22 November 1979) is a Nigerian former professional footballer who played as a midfielder. He played for the Nigerian national team.

== Honours ==
Polonia Warsaw

- Ekstraklasa: 1999–2000
- Polish Cup: 2000–01
- Polish League Cup: 1999–2000
- Polish Super Cup: 2000

LZS Piotrówka

- IV liga Opole: 2014–15
