= Anthony Ekezia Ilonu =

Roman Catholic bishop (1937–2012)

- Bishop of Okigwe
- Church: Catholic Church
- Diocese: Diocese of Okigwe
- In office: 24 January 1981 – 22 April 2006
- Predecessor: Diocese erected
- Successor: Solomon Amanchukwu Amatu

Orders
- Ordination: 19 December 1964
- Consecration: 29 March 1981 by Carlo Curis

Personal details
- Born: 13 November 1937
- Died: 17 June 2012 (aged 74)

Anthony Ekezia Ilonu (13 November 1937 – 17 June 2012) was the Roman Catholic bishop of the Roman Catholic Diocese of Okigwe, Nigeria.

Ordained in 1964, Ilonu was named bishop in 1981 and resigned in 2006.
