= Ahiara Declaration =

Biafran focument

Flag of Biafra

The Ahiara Declaration: The Principles of the Biafran Revolution, commonly known as the Ahiara Declaration, was a document written by the National Guidance Committee of Biafra and delivered as a speech by the Head of State of Biafra Emeka Ojukwu in the Biafra town of Ahiara on June 1, 1969.

== Background ==
After a series of pogroms in which people from the former Eastern Region of Nigeria living in other parts of that country were massacred between 1966 and 1967, the region seceded in 1967 and proclaimed an independent Republic of Biafra. A bitter war ensued as Nigeria fought to foil the secession of the oil-rich region. After three years of war and the loss of more than two million lives, the nascent republic lost its struggle for independence and was reabsorbed into Nigeria in January 1970. The leader of the republic, Oxford educated General Chukwuemeka Odumegwu Ojukwu, went into exile, but later returned to Nigeria in 1983 under special pardon. In 1969 Biafra adopted one of the most progressive national constitutions in Africa at the time. The Constitution or "Principles" drew heavily from traditional communal modes of governance but was also informed by progressive political developments in other parts of the world in the 1960s, and the ideology of "Non-alignment" adopted by several post-colonial states during the Cold War. It also provided a platform for the country to criticise the West for its role in the plight of the rest of the world and to set out the ideals of the young nation.

== Document ==
Modeled on Tanzanian President Julius Nyerere's 1967 Arusha Declaration, it was one of multiple documents drafted by Biafra's National Guidance Committee, a body including renowned author Chinua Achebe. The declaration criticized corruption in both Nigeria and Biafra, as well as imperialism on the part of outside countries, and encouraged patriotism among the Biafrans.

According to Alexis Heraclides in her book The Self-Determination of Minorities in International Politics, the declaration signaled a shift to a more politically radical phase in Biafra's short history. General Ojukwu lambasted Britain, and in particular the "Anglo-Saxon branch of [the white] race", for having repeatedly "sinned against the world" in the form of numerous genocides, including that of the Biafran people:

For two years we have been subjected to a total blockade. We all know how bitter, bloody and protracted the First and Second World Wars were. At no stage in those wars did the white belligerents carry out a total blockade of their fellow whites. In each case where a blockade was imposed, allowance was made for certain basic necessities of life in the interest of women, children and other non-combatants. Ours is the only example in recent history where a whole people have been so treated. What is it that makes our case different? Do we not have women, children and other non-combatants? Does the fact that they are black women, black children and black non-combatants make such a world of difference?

The tract encourages the Biafran people to persist in their efforts, assuring them of the moral value of their sacrifices. Ojukwu emphasizes the difference between this revolution and other revolutions, in that the world seems to be unified against their cause; economic and political interests, as well as racist indifference to the suffering of black-skinned noncombatants, are the especial challenges of the Biafran movement. The "Nigerianism" against which they were struggling was merely a system of opportunism and exploitation:

Our struggle has far-reaching significance. It is the latest recrudescence in our time of the age-old struggle of the black man for his full stature as man. We are the latest victims of a wicked collusion between the three traditional scourges of the black man - racism, Arab-Muslim expansionism and white economic imperialism. Playing a subsidiary role is Bolshevik Russia seeking for a place in the African sun. Our struggle is a total and vehement rejection of all those evils which blighted Nigeria, evils which were bound to lead to the disintegration of that ill-fated federation. Our struggle is not a mere resistance - that would be purely negative. It is a positive commitment to build a healthy, dynamic and progressive state, such as would be the pride of black men the world over...

...Since in the thinking of many white powers a good, progressive and efficient government is good only for whites, our view was considered dangerous and pernicious: a point of view which explains but does not justify the blind support which these powers have given to uphold the Nigerian ideal of a corrupt, decadent and putrefying society. To them genocide is an appropriate answer to any group of black people who have the temerity to attempt to evolve their own social system.

When the Nigerians violated our basic human rights and liberties, we decided reluctantly but bravely to found our own state, to exercise our inalienable right to self-determination as our only remaining hope for survival as a people. Yet, because we are black, we are denied by the white powers the exercise of this right which they themselves have proclaimed inalienable. In our struggle we have learnt that the right of self-determination is inalienable, but only to the white man.
