= Joseph Brendan Whelan =

Roman Catholic bishop

Joseph Brendan Whelan C.S.Sp.
- Bishop of Owerri
- Church: Catholic Church
- Diocese: Diocese of Owerri
- In office: 12 February 1948 – 25 June 1970
- Predecessor: Vicariate erected
- Successor: Mark Onwuha Unegbu
- Other post: Titular Bishop of Tres Tabernae (1970-1976)
- Previous post: Titular Bishop of Tiddi (1948-1950)

Orders
- Ordination: 4 July 1937
- Consecration: 25 April 1948 by Charles Heerey

Personal details
- Born: 25 May 1909 Limerick, County Limerick, United Kingdom of Great Britain and Ireland
- Died: 8 December 1990 (aged 81)

Bishop Joseph Brendan Whelan, C.S.Sp.(1909-1990) was an Irish Spiritan prelate who served as Bishop of Owerri in Nigeria.

== Early life and education ==
Born 25 May 1909 in St Michael's Parish, Limerick City, his secondary schooling was at Blackrock College in Dublin, joining the Holy Ghost Fathers, he studied at University College Dublin, where he took first place and was a scholarship winner in his BA. In 1934 he went to Rome to study Theology at the Gregorian University, earning an Honours Doctorate.

== Episcopacy ==
Whelan served as Bishop of Owerri from 1950 to 1970 (and experienced the Nigerian Civil War (1966 to 1970). He was there with the people and the diocese that he built until when he was imprisoned prior to being deported), before Owerri was elevated to a diocese, he was appointed in 1948 as Vicar Apostolic of Owerri. Following deportation to Ireland Bishop Whelan received a very warm welcome in Dublin, with politicians, religious leaders and the general public turning out to celebrate his release, on his return.

== Later life ==
Following his deportation from Nigeria, he worked at Duquesne University, Pittsburgh, and returned to Kimmage Manor in 1971.

He died on 8 December 1990.
