= Lucius Iwejuru Ugorji =

Nigerian Catholic prelate (born 1952)

- Archbishop of Owerri
- Church: Catholic Church; Latin Church
- Archdiocese: Owerri
- Appointed: 6 March 2022
- Installed: 23 June 2022
- Predecessor: Anthony John Valentine Obinna
- Successor: incumbent
- Other posts: Apostolic Administrator of Ahiara (2018‍–‍present); President, Catholic Bishops' Conference of Nigeria (2022‍–‍present)
- Previous post: Bishop of Umuahia (1990‍–‍2018)

Orders
- Ordination: 16 April 1977
- Consecration: 1 July 1990 by Paul Fouad Naïm Tabet, Anthony Gogo Nwedo, Albert Kanene Obiefuna

Personal details
- Born: 13 January 1952 (age 74) Naze, Nigeria
- Coat of arms

Lucius Iwejuru Ugorji // (born January 13, 1952) is a Nigerian prelate of the Catholic Church who serves as the Archbishop of the Latin Church archdiocese of Owerri in Imo State, Nigeria.

In 2022, he was appointed as the president of the Catholic Bishops' Conference of Nigeria (CBCN). He followed on from the previous president, Augustine Obiora Akubeze.

== Clerical career ==
Lucius Iwejuru Ugorji was ordained a priest on April 16, 1977.

On April 2, 1990, Pope John Paul II appointed him Bishop of Umuahia. The Apostolic Pro-Nuntius in Nigeria, Archbishop Paul Fouad Tabet, consecrated him bishop on July 1 of the same year in Umuahia Cathedral; co-consecrators were the Bishop of Awka, Albert Kanene Obiefuna, and the Bishop Emeritus of Umuahia, Anthony Gogo Nwedo.

Pope Francis additionally appointed him Apostolic Administrator of the Diocese of Ahiara on February 19, 2018, for the duration of a vacancy that came about due to the crisis surrounding Peter Okpaleke, the bishop who was rejected by many priests in the diocese due to his ancestry.

Pope Francis appointed Ugorji archbishop of Owerri on March 6, 2022.

== Suspected plagiarism ==
Ugorji's dissertation on the ethical principle of double effect was submitted to Bruno Schüller (1925–2007) at the University of Münster in 1984, and published as a book in 1985. It was well-received by several moral theologians but Alkuin Schachenmayr noted in a 2022 essay in Forum Katholische Theologie that numerous passages of the doctoral thesis were originally published by other authors, although Ugorji presented their texts as his intellectual property. Several parts were copied from popular reference works, other parts from an American dissertation published in 1935.

== See also ==
- Catholic Church in Nigeria
