= Raphael Nnanna Igbokwe =

Nigerian politician

Raphael Nnanna Igbokwe is a Nigerian politician who represented the Ahiazu/Ezinihitte Federal Constituency in Imo State. He served in the 7th and 8th House of Representatives.
