= Otulu, Ahiara =

Village in Imo State, Nigeria

Otulu is one of the ten villages of Ahiara, Imo State, Nigeria. It has nine hamlets, namely:

- Ihite*
- Umuokoro
- Umuaghara
- Umuagwu
- Umugaa
- Umuakam
- Umuorise
- Umuoke
- Umuoyaa

The people of Otulu have a large market called Nkwo Otulu. The community is mainly Catholic with Parish called St. Joseph Catholic Parish Otulu. They have one secondary School, Community Secondary School Otulu built by the community in the early eighties. Before the secondary school, there existed two primary schools, St Joseph Primary school Otulu being the foremost and Group School Otulu.
