= Obowo =

Local Government Area in Imo State

- LGA
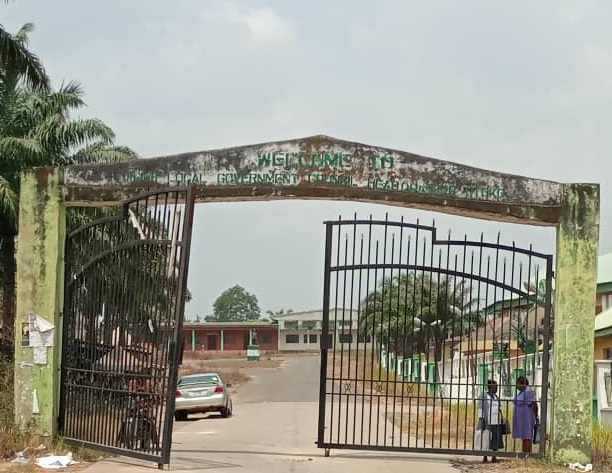
- Obowo Headquarters Entrance
- Interactive map of Obowo
- Country: Nigeria
- State: Imo State
- Capital: Isi Nweke

Government
  - Local Government Chairman: Obioma Johnson
- Time zone: UTC+1 (WAT)

Obowo, also spelled Obowu is a Local Government Area in Imo State, Nigeria formed during the Ibrahim Babangida administration in May 1989. It was carved out of Etiti Local Government Area with its headquarters at Isi Nweke. There are twenty-two autonomous communities in Obowo Local Government Area. Achara, Amanze, Umuariam, Umunachi, Umuagu, Ehume, Umungwa, Umulogho, Odenkwume, Okwuohia, Amuzi, Alike, Avutu, Umuosochie and Umuoke are towns in the L.G.A. Obowo is located about 45 minutes from Owerri, across the Imo River and is less than 30 minutes from the Umuahia and Ahiara in opposite directions with the Amanze seven and a half (7 1/2) junction and landmark in-between. It is surrounded by Ahiazu and Aboh Mbaise Local Government Areas to the north and Umuahia Abia State to the East.

The people of Obowo Local Government Area are known for farming and fishing and they produce palm oil, kernel, local baskets, brooms and rice. They are also known for politics and as a result, the Local Government Area produced the first executive Governor of Imo State in the person of late Sam Mbakwe. Dr. Abraham Nwankwo, Director-General (DG) of the DMO, spanning the period July 2007 to June 2017. Other prominent politicians in Obowo Local Government Area include Chris Okewulaonu, Chike Okafor, Dr Goderick Anosike, Dr Raymond Obioma Emerenini, Sylvester Anyanwu, Longinus Anyanwu, Charles Ugwu, Celestine Ngobiwu, Fabian Ihekweme, Kennedy Ibe and Ike C. Ibe.

A cultural festival known as "Iwa Akwa Festival" exists in Obowo Local Government Area. Other festivals in the area include Ekpo, Mbomuzo and Egbe-Nkwu. There are also some tourist attraction centers in Obowo Local Government Area. They include the Green Coloured Abadaba Lake which is situated at Odenkwume Autonomous Community, Iyi-Ukwu and the Umuariam Game Reserve Center with live monkeys.

== The Local Government ==
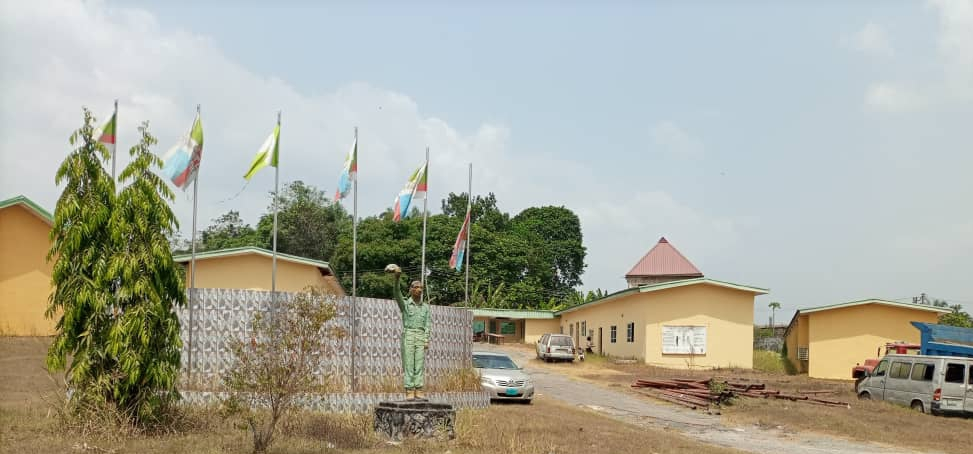
Front View of Obowo Headquarters

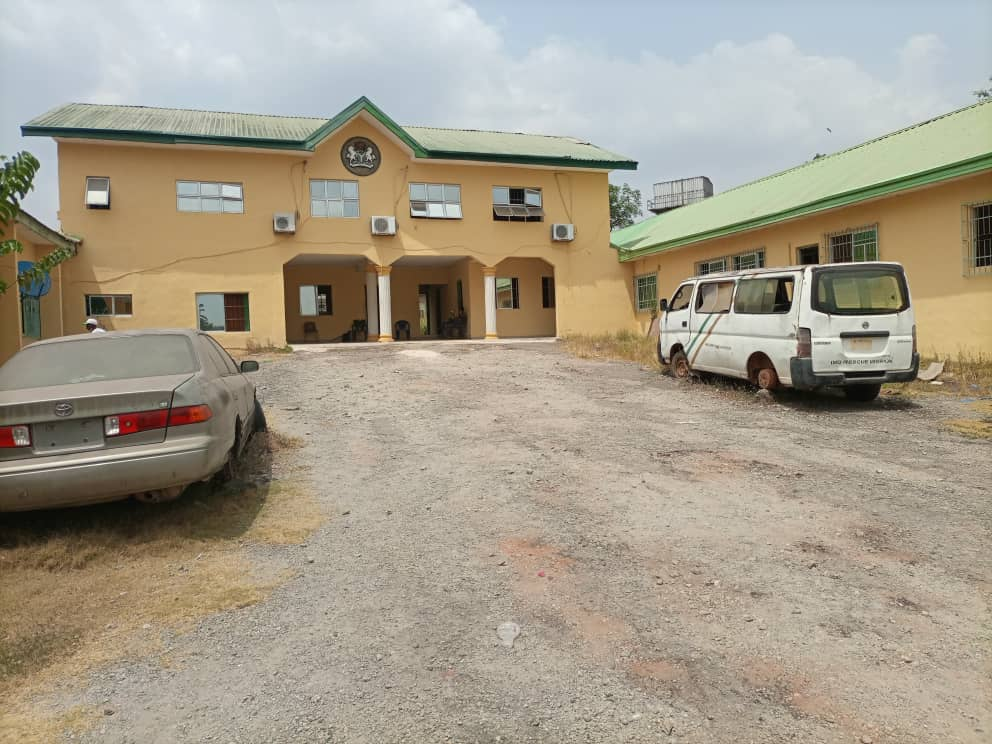
Obowo Headquarters Building

The Obowo Local Government Council was formed by the defunct Ibrahim Babangida Administration during the creation of Local Governments in Nigeria in May 1989. It was formerly a part of the Local Government Etiti headquartered in Isi-Nweke. It is home to about twenty-two autonomous communities.

== Economy ==
Formerly based around farming and fishing, the economy of Obowo now includes areas of industrial services, ranging from manufacturing to communications. Obowo people produce a large quantity of palm oil, kernel, local baskets, brooms, and rice.

== Culture and Tourism ==
Obowo have a very rich cultural festival, the Iwa-Akwa Festival, which embraces the general Obowo citizen. Other festivals include, Ekpo, Mbomuzo, Egbe-Nkwu. Popular tourist attractions in the area are Green Coloured Abadaba Lake which is located in Odenkwume Autonomous Community, Iyi-Ukwu, and the Umuariam Game Reserve Centre with live monkeys. The Obowo people are ancestrally linked to Mbaise people, they are regarded as an offshoot of the Ezinihitte-Mbaise people.
