= Schwalbach =

Schwalbach can refer to several places in Germany:

- Bad Schwalbach, in the Rheingau-Taunus-Kreis, Hesse
- Schwalbach am Taunus, in the Main-Taunus-Kreis, Hesse
- Schwalbach, Saarland, in the district of Saarlouis, Saarland
- Schwalbach (Sulzbach), a river of Hesse, Germany

== People ==
- George J. Schwalbach (1866–1966), American politician
- Henry V. Schwalbach (1878–1958), American politician
- John F. Schwalbach (1845–1915), American politician
- Jennifer Schwalbach Smith (born 1971), American actress
