= Umuoke =

Village in Imo state, Nigeria

Umuokeh or Umuoke is a village situated in Obowo local government area of Imo state, Nigeria.

Hamlets of Umuoke eleven (11) villages include: Umuonyeocha, Umuanyanwune,Umuezeala,Ogbaedere, Umuosimaku, Umuezezuru,Umuebea,Umuakama, Umueze, Umunam, Umuokoro. The people are very hospitable and it has a beautiful undulating landscape of hills and rivers. Christ the King Catholic Church at Orie Umuokeh is one famous site to visit. It is an ancient missionary church dating back to 1940. This church is located near the boundary between Umuokeh and Umulogho. Also St Marks Anglican Church sited at Eke Umuokeh is one of ancient missionaries

Umuahia, the state capital of Abia, is just five kilometres / three miles from Umuokeh. Umuokeh community has seven Village major community links roads,e g Umueze link road to Umungwa community,Umuezeala link road to Umunachi community, Umuezezuru/Umuosimaku link road to Ehume community, Umuonyeocha link road to Amanyi Ihitte Uboma, Umuebea link road to Amanyi Umunnam link road to Amanyi Umuanyanwune link road Alamkpu Ehume

Geopolitical zone. Umuokeh is known as polygamous family.. This is why Umuokeh community have two first son in shearing formula.

Umuokeh is in two blocs Uhuama bloc and Umuosuocha bloc

The first Son of Uhuama is Umuonyeocha

Uhuama is made of 4 villages,, Umuonyeocha, Ogbodere,Umuebea and Umunnam

The first Son of Umuosuocha is Umuanyanwune

Umuosuocha is made of 7 villages Umuanyanwune, Umuezeala, Umuosimaku, Umuezezuru,Umuakama,Umueze and Umuokoro..

In all ,, Umuonyeocha having been the first son of the first wife is known as Opara Umuokeh (First son of Umuokeh)
