= Ekwereazu =

Towns in Imo State, Nigeria

Coordinates: 5.5425°N 7.2292°E

Ekwereazu (or Ekwerazu) is a town in Mbaise, Imo State, Nigeria. It is made up of six communities: Oparanadim, Mpam, Ihitte-Afor Ukwu, Umuokirika (now Okrika Nwankwo and Okrika Nweke), Obohia and Ekwereazu Town.
