= Archdiocese of Owerri =

Latin Catholic archdiocese in Nigeria

Archdiocese of Owerri Archidioecesis Overriensis
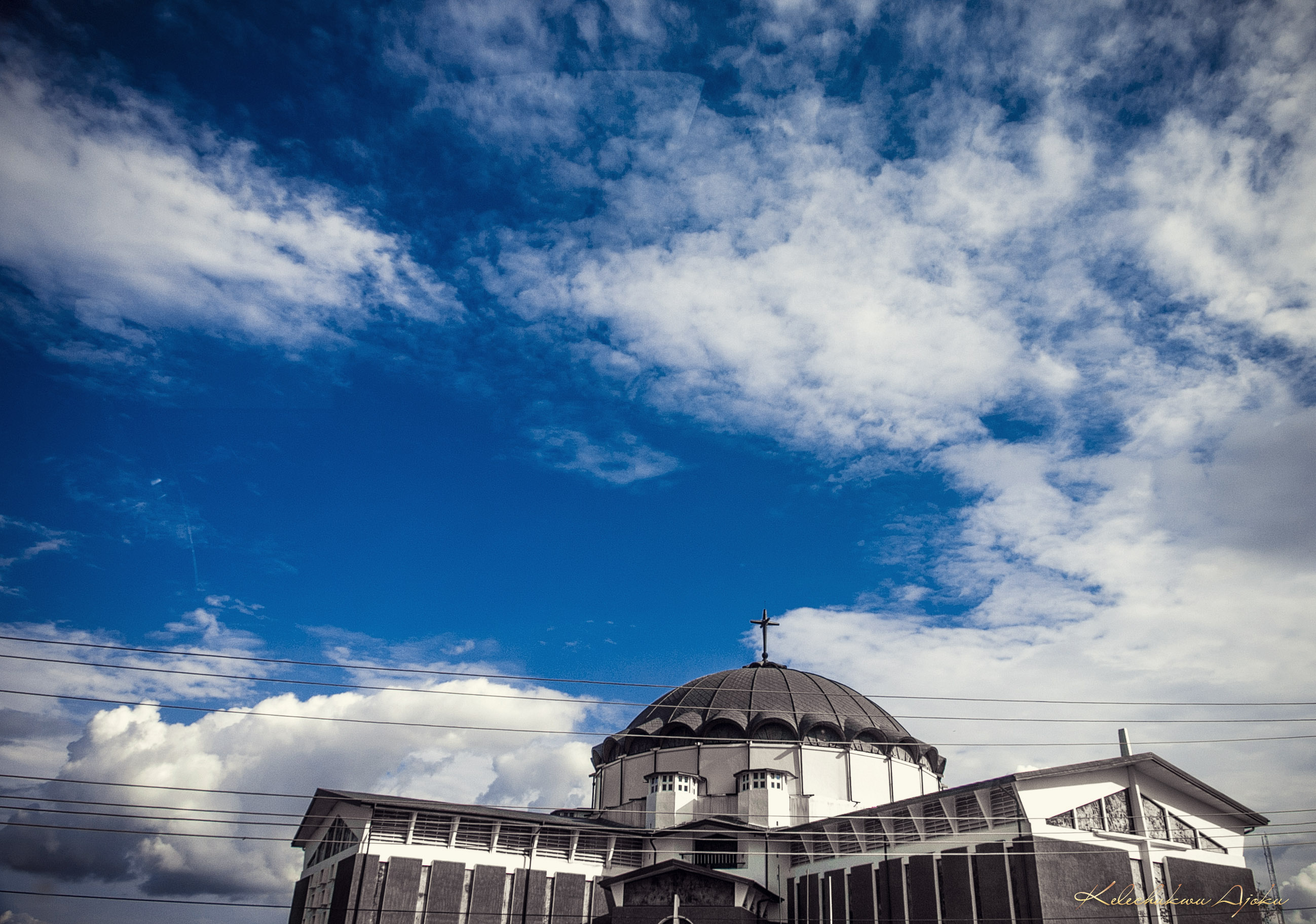
- Assumpta Cathedral

Location
- Country: Nigeria
- Territory: Imo State
- Episcopal conference: Catholic Bishops' Conference of Nigeria
- Ecclesiastical province: Owerri
- Coordinates: 5°29′06″N 7°02′06″E

Statistics
- Area: 2,996 km^{2} (1,157 sq mi)
- Population: Total; Catholics: (as of 2023); 1,555,338; ▼1,079,950 (▼69.4%)
- Parishes: ▲164 (2023)

Information
- Denomination: Catholic
- Sui iuris church: Latin Church
- Rite: Roman Rite
- Established: Diocese: 18 April 1950 (76 years ago); Archdiocese: 26 March 1994 (32 years ago)
- Cathedral: Assumpta Cathedral
- Secular priests: 396 total (2023); 279 diocesan; 117 religious priests

Current leadership
- Pope: Leo XIV
- Metropolitan Archbishop: Lucius Iwejuru Ugorji
- Auxiliary Bishops: Moses Chikwe
- Bishops emeritus: Anthony J.V. Obinna

Map
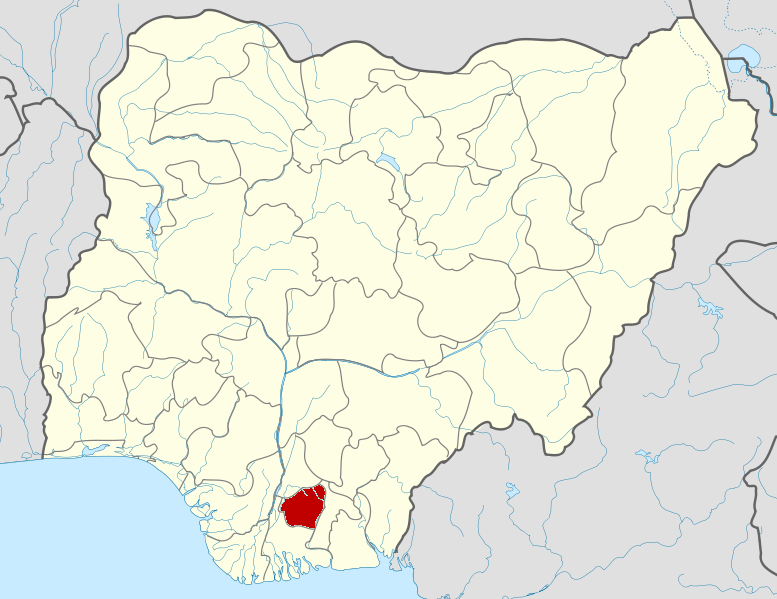
- Imo State shown in red

Website
- www.owarch.org

The Archdiocese of Owerri (Latin: Archidioecesis Overriensis) is a Latin Catholic archdiocese of the Catholic Church in Owerri, Imo State, Nigeria. The Seat of Wisdom Seminary is in Owerri.

== History ==
The diocese dates back to the Vicariate Apostolic of Owerri, which was created on February 12, 1948, when the Vicariate Apostolic of Onitsha-Owerri was split. On April 18, 1950, it was elevated to a diocese. On March 26, 1994, it became an archdiocese.

On 27 December 2020, auxiliary bishop Moses Chikwe and his driver were kidnapped by gunmen in Owerri. They were both released unharmed and without ransom, on 1 January 2021.

== Statistics ==
The archdiocese covers an area of 2,996 km^{2} (1,157 sq mi).

1,079,950 (69.4%) of the 1.55 million people (2023) in the area are Catholic. The archdiocese hosts 376 total priests (297 diocesan and 117 religious (2023). There are 164 parishes in the archdiocese (2023).

== Bishops ==
=== Ordinaries ===
- Vicar Apostolic of Owerri (Latin Church)
  - Joseph Brendan Whelan, C.S.Sp. 12 Feb 1948 – 18 Apr 1950; see below
- Bishops of Owerri
  - Joseph Brendan Whelan, C.S.Sp. 18 Apr 1950 – 25 Jun 1970; see above
  - Mark Onwuha Unegbu 25 Jun 1970 – 1 Jul 1993
  - Anthony J.V. Obinna 1 Jul 1993 – 1993; see below
- Metropolitan Archbishops of Owerri
  - Anthony J.V. Obinna 26 Mar 1994 – 6 Mar 2022; see above
  - Lucius Iwejuru Ugorji since 6 Mar 2022; see above

=== Auxiliary bishop ===
- Moses Chikwe (2019– )

=== Other priests of this diocese who became bishop ===
- Augustine Ndubueze Echema, appointed Bishop of Aba in 2019

== Suffragan Dioceses ==
- Aba
- Ahiara
- Okigwe
- Orlu
- Umuahia

== See also ==
- Catholic Church in Nigeria
- List of Catholic dioceses in Nigeria
