= Anthony J.V. Obinna =

Nigerian Catholic prelate

Most Reverend Anthony J.V. Obinna
- Archbishop Emeritus of Owerri
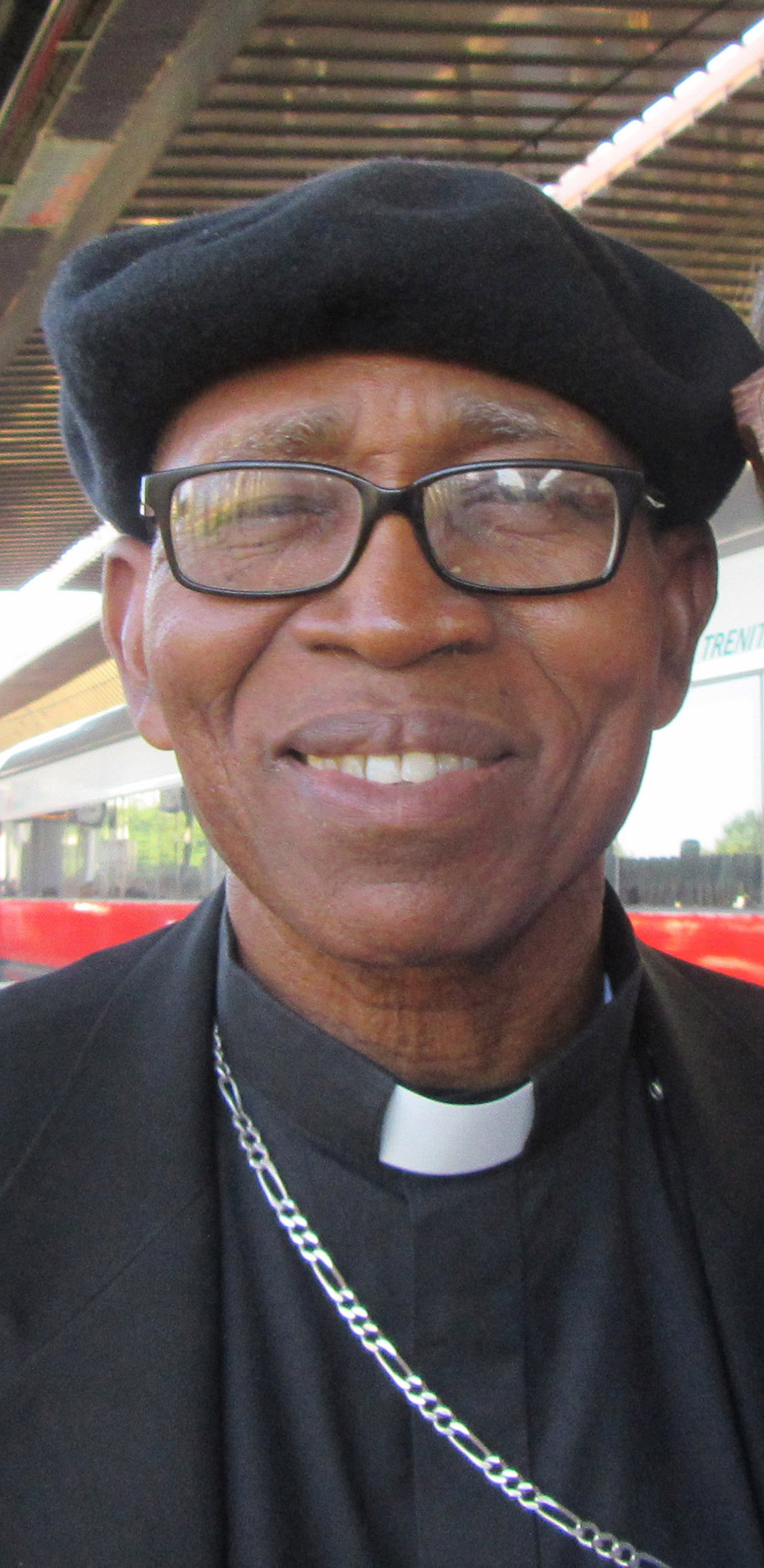
- Archbishop Obinna in Rogoredo on 18 June 2017.
- Church: Roman Catholic Church
- Archdiocese: Owerri
- See: Owerri
- Appointed: 26 March 1994
- Term ended: 6 March 2022
- Predecessor: Mark Onwuha Unegbu
- Successor: Lucius Iwejuru Ugorji
- Previous post: Bishop of Owerri (1993-94)

Orders
- Ordination: 9 April 1972
- Consecration: 4 September 1993 by Carlo Maria Viganò

Personal details
- Born: Anthony John Valentine Obinna; 26 June 1946 (age 79) Emekukwu, Nigeria
- Denomination: Catholic (Roman Rota)
- Motto: To serve God and His people

Styles of Anthony John Valentine Obinna
- Reference style: Most Reverend
- Spoken style: Your Grace, Amarachi
- Religious style: His Grace
- Posthumous style: none

Anthony John Valentine Obinna (born 26 June 1946 in Emekukwu, Imo State, Nigeria) is a Nigerian prelate of the Roman Catholic Church who served as the archbishop of Owerri from 26 March 1994 until 6 March 2022.

== Biography ==
Ordained as a priest on 1972, he incardinated in the Diocese of Owerri. Pope John Paul II appointed him as the bishop of Owerri diocese in 1993. He was consecrated by bishop Carlo Maria Viganò on the following 4 September. On 26 March 1994 he was appointed as the first archbishop of Owerri.

Catholic Church titles
Preceded by Mark Onwuha Unegbu	Bishop of Owerri; 1993–1994	Succeeded by
Preceded by himself	Archbishop of Owerri; 1994–2022	Succeeded by Lucius Iwejuru Ugorji
