= Ahiara =

City in Imo state, Nigeria

Coordinates: 5°31′40.2″N 7°16′23.9″E

Ahiara is a city in Mbaise, Imo State, Nigeria.

It was the location of Chukwuemeka Odumegwu Ojukwu's Ahiara Declaration during the Nigerian Civil War.

The Mater Ecclesiae Cathedral in Ahiara is the seat of the Roman Catholic Diocese of Ahiara.
