= Emekeobibi =

Village in Imo State, Nigeria

Emekeobibi is a village in southeastern Nigeria. It is located in the Local Government Area (LGA) Owerri North, Imo State; near the city Owerri.
