= Amuneke =

Amuneke audio is a surname of Igbo origin in south eastern Nigeria.

== Notable people with the surname include ==
- Kevin Amuneke (born 1986), Nigerian footballer
- Kingsley Amuneke (born 1980), Nigerian footballer
