= Naze, Imo State =

Naze
- Town
- Interactive map of Naze
- Coordinates: 5°26′N 7°4′E5°26′N 7°4′E
- Country: Nigeria
- State: Imo State
- Elevation: 74 m (243 ft)
- Time zone: UTC+1 (Africa/Lagos)

Naze is a town in southeastern Nigeria, 408 km south of Abuja, the country's capital. It is located in the Owerri North local government area of Imo State.

Alaenyi comprises five towns: Ihitte-Ogada, Awaka, Egbu, Naze and Owerri-Nchi-Ise. Naze is made up of six villages: Umuorie, Ezeakiri, Umuosu, Umuezuo, Okpuala, and Umuakali. The market is Nkwo Naze, hitherto known as Amara – Isu where traders from hinterlands (Isomas) came to see civil society. Today Naze is regarded for its farmers markets, vegetable stands, and large churches.

The people of Naze embraced Western education earlier, on two mission schools, St Jude's Catholic School and St John's Anglican School, were established in the 19th and early 20th century. Because of this, many Nigerian statesmen have come from Naze, including Pa J.K. Nzerem, Pa Udo Ahana, Pa James Udeh, Pa Ihebuzor, Pa Oleru, Pa Emmanuel Onyiriuka, Pa Emeana, Pa Vincent Onyewuotu, Pa Daniel Onyewuotu, Pa Julius Amadi, Pa Theophilus Ihenacho, Pa Stephen Merenini, Pa Ngoka, Pa Benny Nzeh, Engr. Amadi Amechi, and Pa Cyril Udeh.
