= Uratta =

Village in Imo state, Nigeria

Uratta (also Oratta) is a large collection of 10 communities in southeastern Nigeria. It is located in and around the outskirts of the city of Owerri and falls within the Owerri North local government jurisdiction. Uratta bloc (clan) is further subdivided into six autonomous communities which are:

1. Amakohia
2. Akwakuma
3. Orji
4. Ihitaoha-uratta
5. Obibi-uratta
6. Owalla

The communities which make up the six autonomous communities are the present day:

1. Umualum
2. Umuorii
3. Umuobaa
4. Okwu
5. Owalla
6. Owaelu
7. Amakohia
8. Umunahu
9. Akwakuma
10. Orji

The electoral wards in Uratta include

- Obibi-uratta I
  - Umualum
  - Umuorii
  - Umuoba
  - Okwu
- Obibi-uratta II
  - Owalla
  - Owaelu
  - Umunahu
- Orji-uratta
  - Orji
- Ihitaoha-uratta
  - Amakohia
  - Akwakuma
