= Otamiri River =

River in Nigeria

Coordinates: 4.903889°N 7.141667°E

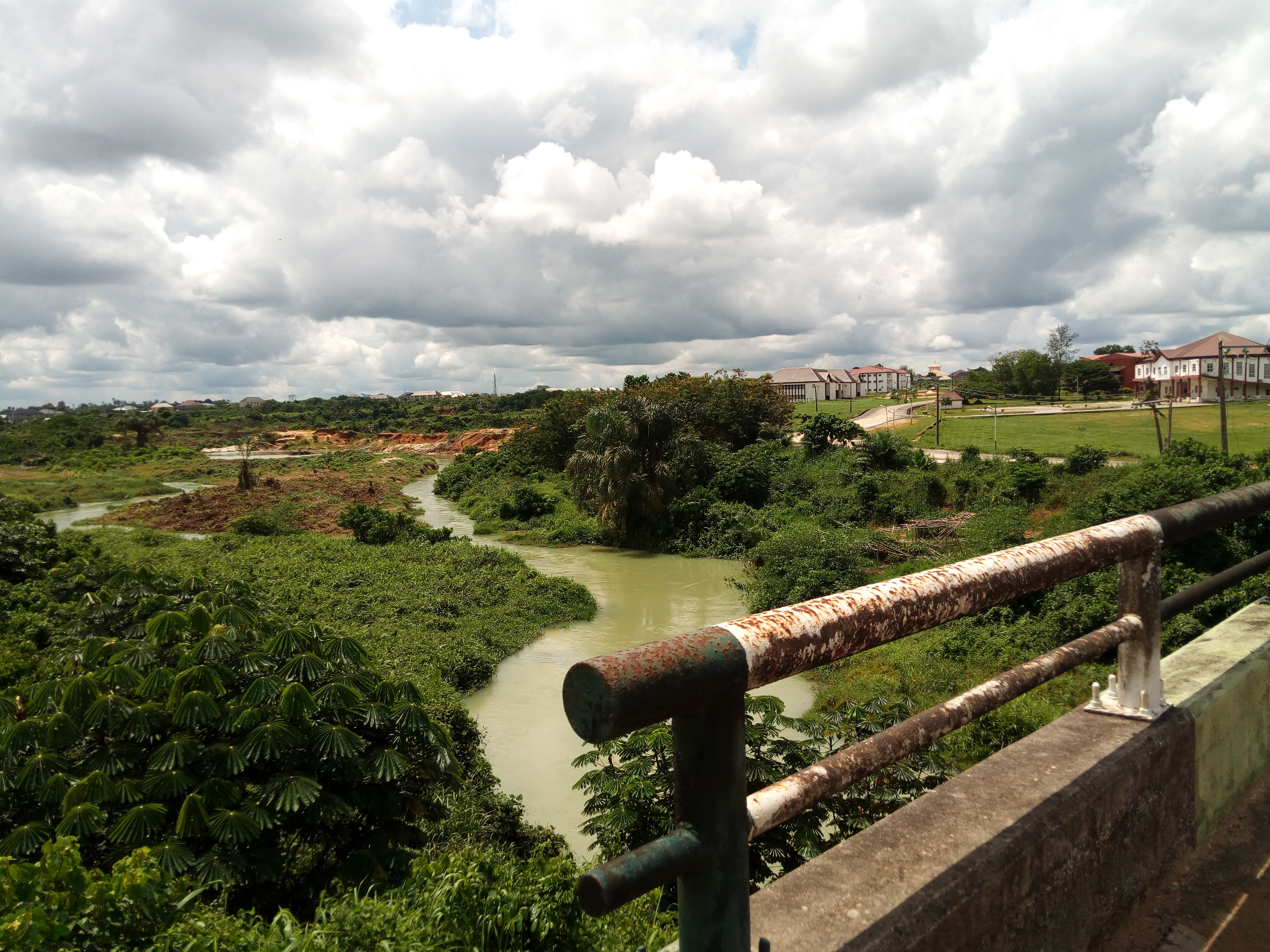
Otamiri River

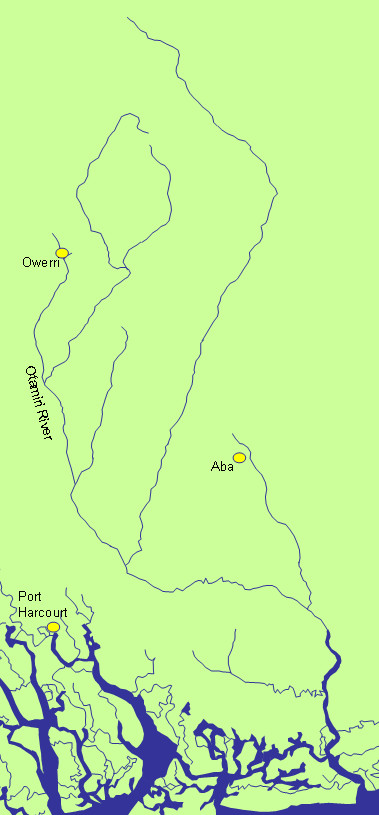
Otamiri River and tributaries

The Otamiri River is one of the main river systems in Imo State, Nigeria. The river runs south from its source (Ishi Mmiri) at Egbu, past Owerri urban centre, and through the Owerri West and Ohaji/Egbema Local Government Areas at Nekede, Ihiagwa, Eziobodo, Olokwu Umuisi, Mgbirichi, and Umuagwo, before terminating at Ozuzu in Etche, Rivers State, from which it flows into the broader inter-state Imo River system.

== Name and Cultural Significance ==
The river takes its name from Ota Miri, an Igbo deity deemed to own all the waters that are called by his name and who is often a dominating spirit of Mbari houses.

== Geography ==
The Otamiri watershed covers about 10,000 square kilometres (3,900 mi^{2}), with annual rainfall of 2,250 to 2,500 millimetres (89 to 98 in). The watershed is mostly covered by depleted rain forest vegetation, with mean temperatures of 27 °C (81 °F) throughout the year. The length of the river from its source at Egbu to its confluence at Emeabiam, with major upstream tributary Oramiriukwa River, is 30 kilometres (19 mi). The Otamiri is then joined further downstream by its other major tributary about 9.2 kilometres (5.7 mi) long, Nworie River, at Nekede in Owerri.

== Geology ==
South of Owerri, the river flows through an alternating sequence of sands, sandstones and clay-shales. Random sand samples from the bank of Otamiri River between Chokocho and Umuanyaga in Etche Local Government Area, Rivers State, showed that 86 percent of the sand particles are within the ideal range for glass making. Thus, indigenes partake in sandmining and dredging of the Otamiri for local construction material and livelihood.

== Pollution ==
Waste management in Owerri faces significant challenges, enabling pollution of the Otamiri river basin. Most of the officially and unofficially collected municipal waste from Owerri is dumped at unlined open landfill sites like the Nekede-Ihiagwa and Avu dumpsites in Owerri West, which discharge high concentrations of toxic chemical surface water runoff and contaminated sub-surface groundwater leachate directly into the Otamiri. Sandmining and dredging cause significant environmental degradation to the watershed structure by accelerating riverbank erosion, sinkhole formation, and soil destruction. The Nworie river is also subject to intensive human and industrial activities, despite not measuring in excess of acceptable levels of chemical pollution in 2008.

Imo State Water & Sewerage Corporation (ISWSC) has suggested that Otamiri River — as a source of potable water to Owerri, and including tributary Nworie River, which is also used as a potable source by poor indigenes when the public water system fails — may suffer permanent damage if urgent care is not taken to remediate it and stop continued pollution and degradation. The World Bank began a project aiming to ensure safe water for Imo citizens by January 2020.

== Pictures of Otamiri River at Egbu ==
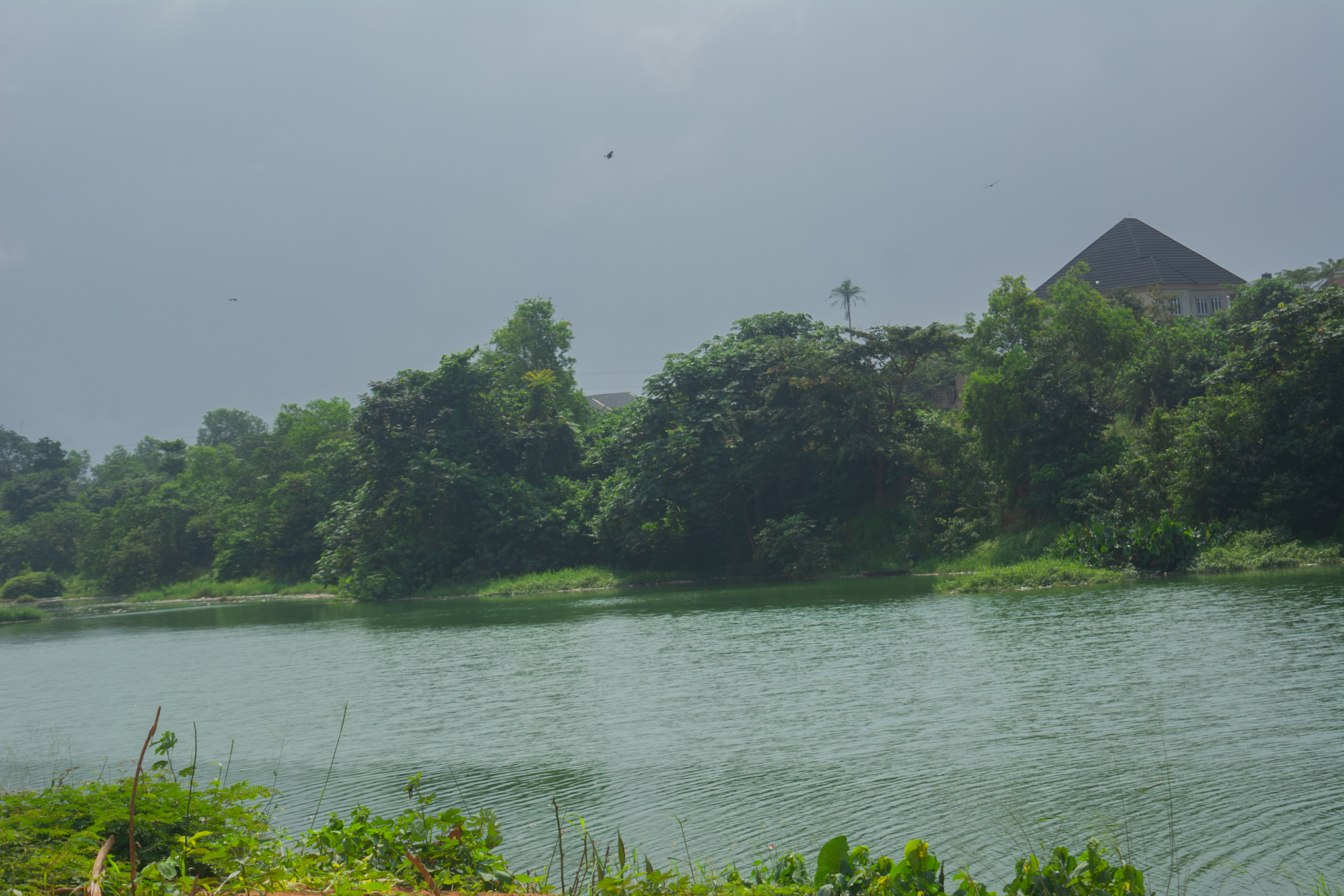
Front view of Otamiri River

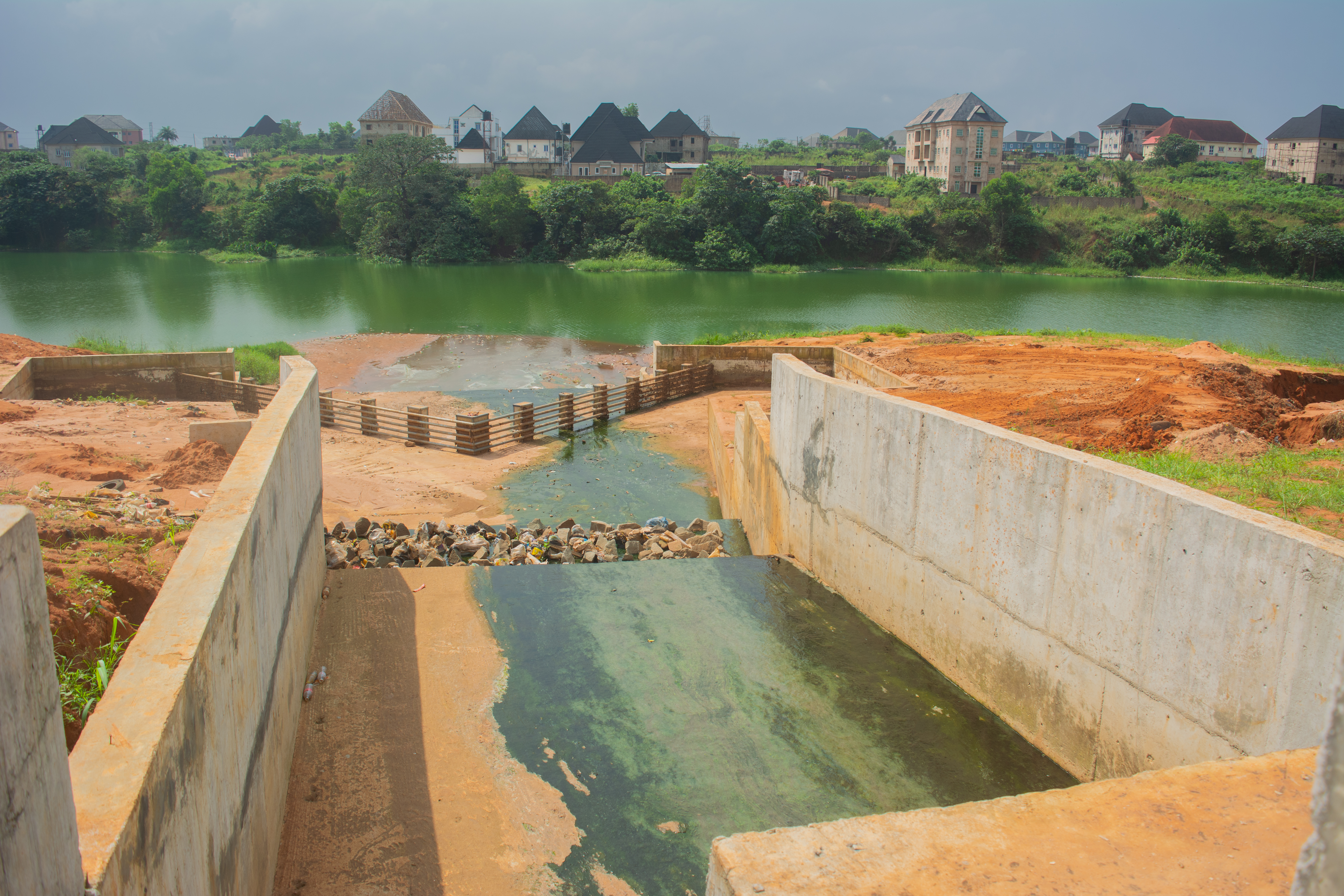
Otamiri River drainage system, through which effluent is discharged into the river.

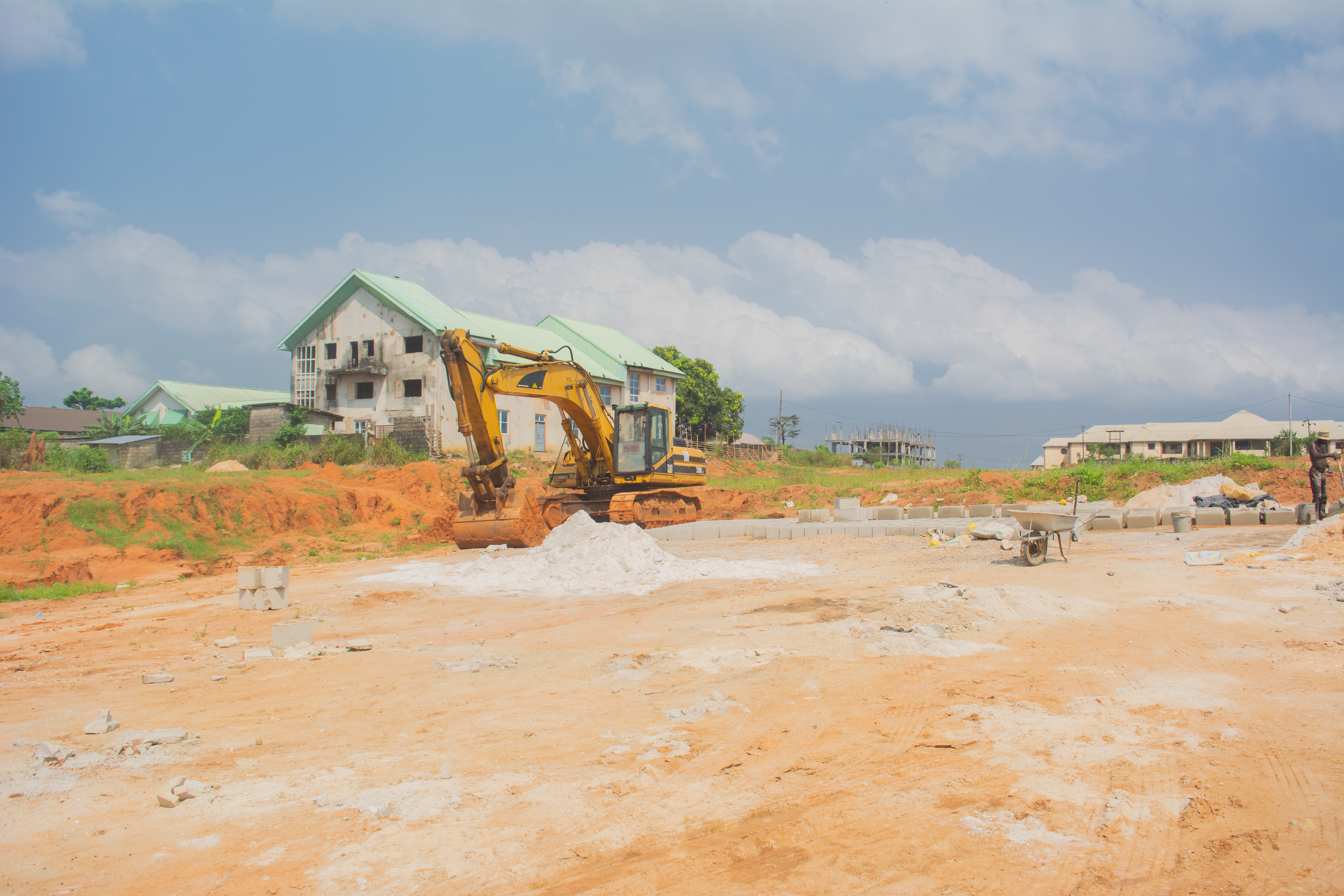
Block industry beside Otamiri river, where block moulders normally get their water for moulding blocks.

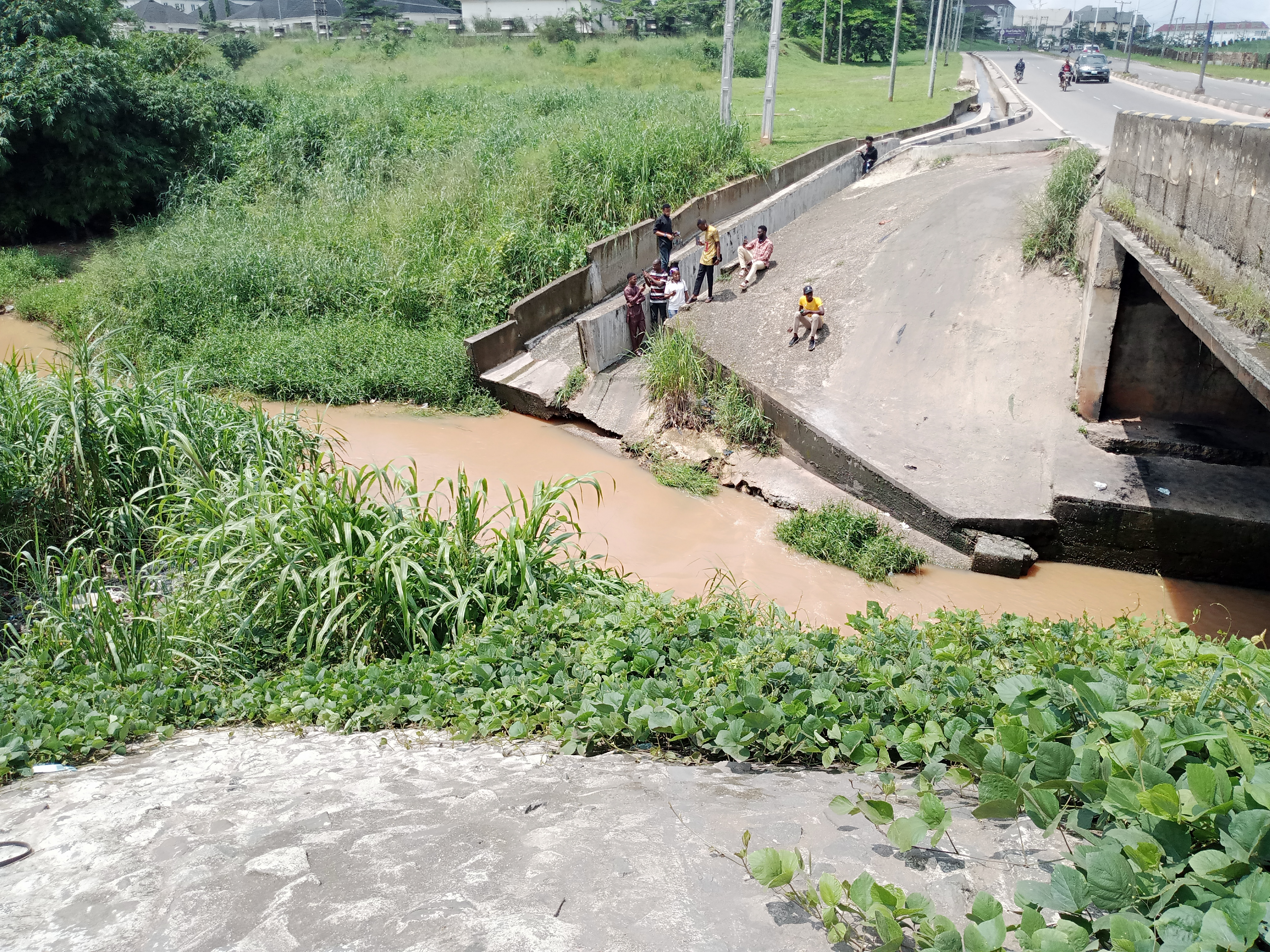
Otamiri River along Akachi Road.
