= Martin Agbaso =

Nigerian senator, economist, politician

Chief Martin Agbaso
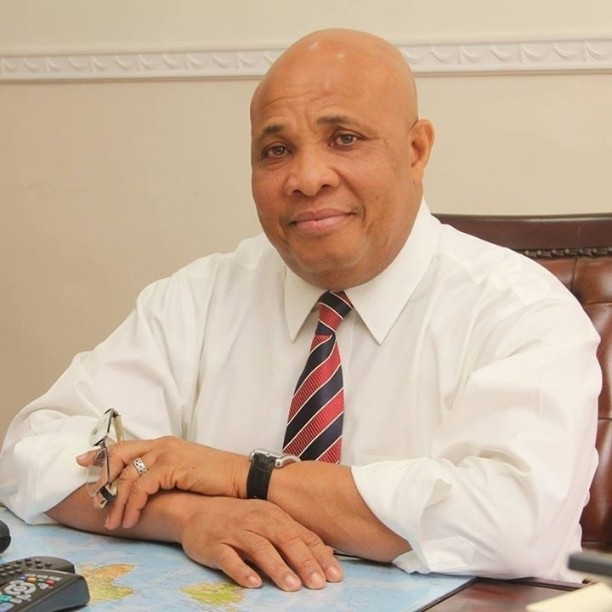

Politician

Personal details
- Born: 1959 Emekuku, Owerri
- Spouse: Robin Agbaso
- Children: Nnanna Agbaso, Adanna Agbaso, Ikenna Agbaso
- Profession: Economist

Chief Martin Agbaso (born 1959) is a Nigerian economist, politician and was a candidate for Governor of Imo State. Agbaso is the former Imo State Senator for Owerri, a special assistant on Ecology to the president of the Federal Republic of Nigeria and is married to Robin Agbaso, an American. The Agbasos have three children.

== Early life and education ==
Chief Martin Agbaso was born on April 5, 1959, in Emekuku, Owerri North Local Government Area of Imo State. The first son of Chief Nathan and Mrs. Anna Agbaso. He began his early education at Our Lady's Primary School, Emekuku (now Chief Obi Memorial Primary School), from which he graduated with the First School Leaving Certificate in 1971. He proceeded to Sabastine Academy, (now Emekuku High School), and graduated in 1976, receiving his West African School Certificate (WAEC).

Martin enrolled at the prestigious Pontifical University of St. Thomas Aquinas in Rome, Italy where he was elected as the first African Secretary General of the International Students. In 1980, he earned his Advanced Diploma in Social Sciences. He went further to earn a B.Sc. and NASD Degrees in Finance, from the State University of New York, Old Westbury, USA, in 1983 and 84 respectively.

== Career ==
Chief Martin Agbaso began his career at Prudential Inc New York, one of the world's most famous finance institutions, from 1983 to 1991, where he rose from the position of management trainee to Financial Analyst. While working for Prudential, he became a member of New York Securities Exchange (1985), a member Million Dollar Roundtable at Prudential Inc. (1985), Member Commodity Improviser New York (1987).

In 1992, Chief Martin founded Agad Nigeria Limited and served as its chief executive. In 1995, he also established Sudriva Limited and Sudenergy Limited.

Chief Martin is the chairman and CEO of Nathan Limited haven bought controlling equity of Nathan's of New York in 1997 and grew the company to become one of the largest Garment Processing Company in Africa. He is also the chief executive of Agbaso Integrated Farms which is an advanced technology driven integrated farm located on 35 hectares of land in Emekuku Owerri.

== Political career ==
Martin Agbaso got into politics in 1992 and won the Imo East Senatorial seat under the platform of the National Republican Convention, In 1998, he won the Senatorial seat in the election under the platform of the Democratic Party of Nigeria (DPN).

In 2001, Martin accepted President Olusegun Obasanjo’s invitation to serve as his special assistant on ecology, a role he played from 2001 to 2004.

Chief Agbaso became the All Progressives Grand Alliance (APGA) candidate for gubernatorial election in Imo State in 2007; the election was cancelled by INEC while he had the lead. He went on to become the Leader of the All Progressive Grand Alliance (APGA), Imo State and between 2017 and 2018 served as the National Chairman of APGA.

In November 2018, he joined APC with over 27,000 members from APGA.

== Personal life ==
Martin Agbaso is a Christian of Catholic Faith, he is married to Mrs. Robin Agbaso and he has three children and grandchildren.

== Official sites ==
- Governor of Imo State Candidate - Official gubernatorial campaign website
