= Umuguma =

Village in Imo State, Nigeria

Umuguma Townis Owerri West Local Government Area's headquarters. It is in Imo State, Nigeria. It evolved out of the old Owerri Local Government Area in 1996. Umuguma—a descendant of Arugo—is one of the 774 communities in the constitution of the Federal Republic of Nigeria as Local Government administrative

== History ==
The ancestral homeland of Umuguma was located on the banks of the Nwaorie river, where Holy Ghost College (Arugo High School) Owerri is now located. Oratta's offspring include Ekwema and Arugo. Ekwema begat Owerre and Arugo begat Umuguma. Since Umuguma endured suffering due to the actions of Owerre, many boundaries were redrawn in the latter's favor and thus most of the area is now known as "New Owerri." This term was created by recent settlers and non-indigenous individuals. Others however, take a different stance, believing the Owerri Municipal Local Government relied on the moniker to usurp some Owerri West or Umuguma land for their use.

European Incursion into Igbo Heartland

Umuguma historically was the entry point for the rampaging British frontier force led by one Douglas that finally settled at Owerri. They arrived Umuguma around 1901 and camped there, until their water supply got very low. Having moved far away from Nwaorie over the years in the acquisition of farmlands, the resolve of the community was to shepherd the strangers closer to Nwaorie river. This communication was facilitated through their interpreters Messrs Igbani and Jumbo: Owerre Nchi Ise, eventually became the bridgehead for further incursion into Igbo heartland thus, benefiting from the benevolence of Umuguma. Of course, the Church missionaries were in close pursuit of the frontier force. The Church missionaries continued their sojourning northwards.

Emerging City

Today Umuguma is an emerging City hosting the Headquarters of Owerri West LGA, in Imo State Nigeria. Umuguma is being transformed rapidly from peri-urban status to an emerging urbanized city, adorned with dual carriageway. A traditional bread basket for the residents in the municipal capital of Imo State. Umuguma is host to the two largest Housing Estates in the State: Imo Housing Estate and the World Bank Financed Scheme for Low Income Housing estate and a Federal Low Cost Housing estate. It served as Headquarters of a Brigade in the 2nd Division of the Biafra Army, during the Nigeria-Biafra War (1967-1970). The last Airfield for Biafra was under construction in Umuguma when the war ended suddenly in 1970.

== Geography ==
Umuguma stretches from the Northern part at the roundabout on Sam Mbakwe Avenue by Dream-Land Hotel, through the Coca-Cola Factory off Irete Road on the East, to the Federal Secretariat Complex on Port Harcourt Road to the West and through Port Harcourt expressway including all the Housing Estates - World Bank, Federal and Imo State Housing estates. It borders Owerre at the north, Nnekede at the west, Irete and Okuku on the east and Avu at the south. Umuguma contributed the largest landmass to the Owerri Capital Project in Imo State.

== Leaders ==
The traditional leadership of Umuguma community includes an Eze and President General of the Town Union. Umuguma has five traditional villages: Umuome(First Son), Umunwanyi(first child, first Daughter), Umunkwo(second Daughter), Umuagu(Second Son) and Ogbuosisi. The traditional leadership (Eze) has evolved through several ruling houses.

The Oparanozie ruling house in Umuome produced Eze Herbert Oparanozie (Nnayereugo of Avu/Umuguma Autonomous community) who died in 1987. Thereafter the position remained vacant for several years. In 2000, Eze Nnamdi Ugorji from Ogbuosisi was crowned and is presently the Eze Umuguma.

The General Assembly of Umuguma is the Town Union deliberates on the social, political and economic well-being of the community and assists the Eze in maintaining peace and public order within the community.

The affairs of the Town Union are presided over by the President-General, who oversees other Umuguma Town Union branch presidents, and is the custodian of the Town Union at home. The President-General is elected at a general assembly - the present elected President-General is Engineer Uzoma Kenneth Osuagwu (elected 2014).
