= Azara Egbelu =

Village in Imo state, Nigeria

Azaraegbelu is a villages in southeastern Nigeria located near the city of Owerri. The name has its origin in Emekuku. Azaraegbelu was the first son of Emekuku and is regarded as the most powerful.

Azaraegbelu, being the first son of Ezelukwu, is made up of warriors who have been the backbone of the Emekuku people. The village is one of the birthplaces of Catholicism in Eastern Nigeria as the Catholic Church in Azaraegbelu was built at the same time with one centrally located at Emekuku. The church was built by Irish missionaries. In the recent past, the people of Avuvu in Ikeduru, Enyiogugu in Aboh-Mbaise and some parts of Emii, all came to worship in church at Azaraegbelu.

The then Teachers Training College (TTC) now a catholic secondary school was located in Azaraegbelu. The Radio Nigeria Owerri, which is now called Heartland FM is located in Azaraegbelu. There is also a public Primary School. At the Catholic Church, there is a primary school there run by the Marist Brothers. Azaraegbelu is made up of four kindred, namely; Umuokoro (okoro mama ukwu), Onum (Onuma egbula Ezelukwu), Umuezehu (Ezuhu Oma Onum) and Ama-Achara.

The main market in Azaraegbelu is called Orie-Nwinyi. It is also among the most prominent markets in Emekuku. One of the most memorable days in Azaraegbelu is usually the Orienwainyi Market day during the Christmas period. Masquerades from many communities usually converge in Azaraegbelu for a show.
