= Charles Ugwuh =

Nigerian engineer and industrialist

Charles Chukwuemeka Ugwuh

Minister of Commerce and Industry
- In office 26 July 2007 – 29 Oct 2008
- Preceded by: Aliyu Modibbo Umar
- Succeeded by: Achike Udenwa

Personal details
- Born: 3 December 1942 (age 83) Obowo LGA, Okigwe zone, Imo State, Nigeria

Charles Chukwuemeka Ugwuh (born 3 December 1942) is an engineer and industrialist who headed the Nigerian ministry of commerce and industry from July 2007 to October 2008. He is a member of the People's Democratic Party (PDP).

== Background ==
Charles Chukwuemeka Ugwuh was born on 3 December 1942 in the Obowo Local Government Area of the Okigwe zone of Imo State. Charles Ugwuh holds an MSc in Mechanical Engineering from the University of Birmingham, England. He is the owner of Rokana Industries and Hydro Resources Industries Limited, both located in Imo State.

Charles Ugwuh became president of Manufacturers' Association of Nigeria (MAN). Speaking in 2003, he said that Nigerian companies were willing to go into joint ventures with foreign partners. He was concerned that Nigeria should manufacture goods, rather than import them, and that investors should put money into industries other than oil. He saw the government's role as providing incentives for investors and supplying basic infrastructure such as health, education, social security, and new roads.

== Political career ==
In late 2006, while still president on MAN, Ugwuh competed in the PDP primaries to select their candidate for Imo State governor in the April 2007 elections. Senator Ifeanyi Godwin Araraume was the clear winner, with Ugwuh in tenth place. Apparently due to pressure from President Olusegun Obasanjo, the PDP declared that Ugwuh was their candidate. Araraume contested this decision, and his candidacy was upheld by the Independent National Electoral Commission, despite the fact that the PDP expelled Araraume from the party. The PDP gave their support to Chief Martin Agbaso of the All Progressives Grand Alliance (APGA). Araruame was defeated by Ikedi Ohakim of the Progressive Peoples Alliance. Ugwuh emerged winner of Imo State Chairmanship election on 1st of August 2020. He is presently the Chairman of Imo State Chapter PDP.

== Minister of Commerce and Industry ==
President Umaru Yar'Adua named Charles Ugwuh Minister for Commerce & Industry on 27 July 2007. In September 2007, Charles Ugwuh headed a Nigerian delegation to China for a "Nigeria-China Business and Investment Forum". He noted the expanding investment from China, and expressed hopes that both sides will continue to push economic and trade co-operation to a new level.

In a January 2008 interview, Ugwuh outlined the new government strategy for manufacturing, based on the clustering concept – industrial parks, industrial clusters, enterprise zones, incubators and then free trade zones. In March 2008, Charles Ugwuh allowed a limited number of licences for cement importation, trying to balance the need to protect the local cement industry while meeting unfilled demand. In April 2008, he announced plans to revive the automobile industry, with focus on light vans, trucks and buses. In May 2008 Charles Ugwuh noted that the food crisis, which started with a steep rise in the price of wheat, had spread to other parts of the world. To prevent shortage, the Federal Government would release grain from strategic reserves as needed.

On 29 October 2008, President Umaru Yar'Adua sacked 20 members of his cabinet, including Charles Ugwuh.
