= Black Academy =

Black Academy may refer to:

- The Black Academy, a Canadian organization for the recognition of talent and fostering of African Canadians; founded by Stephan James and Shamier Anderson.
- Black Academy of Arts and Letters, a U.S. organization for the recognition of talent and promotion of African Americans.
- Black Academy of Music, an academy for the study of Black American music, founded by Joe Brazil.
- Black Academy Press, an African-American-owned academic publisher, founded by Sebastian Okechukwu Mezu.
  - Black Academy Review: Quarterly of the Black World, a quarterly journal concerning black colonization and the black diaspora, published by Black Academy Press.

== See also ==
- Black River Academy, Ludlow, Vermont, USA; a historic school building
- Black Forest Academy, Kandern, Germany; a private middle and high school
- Black (disambiguation)
