= Emekuku =

Town in Imo State, Nigeria

Coordinates: 5.4666°N 7.0997°E

Emekuku Emekukwu, Emeke
- Owerri North LGA
- Interactive map of Emekuku
- Country: Nigeria
- State: Imo State

Government
  - Type: Monarchial
- Time zone: UTC+1 (WAT)
- Postal code: 490102

Emekuku, is a town in Owerri North Local Government of Imo State in South-Eastern Nigeria.

There are two great rivers in Emekuku: Okitankwo and Oramiriukwa. Emekuku people belong to a group of people generally referred to as 'Owerre people' sharing the same tonal dialect and similar cultures with this larger group. Nkwo Emeke is the biggest market in Emekuku land and trading activities peak on Nkwo days (Igbo calendar). Orie Nwinyi Emeke is another important market in Azara Egbelu one of the ten villages (Azara Egbelu, Azaraowalla, Akalovo, Ezeogba, Ezedibia, Uboegebelu, Ubowalla, Umuakuru, Umuocham, and Okwuemeke), that make up the town. The most important festival in Emekuku town is called 'Ugu Uzo' Emeke. It is usually celebrated in the month of November of every year. Its celebration date is usually determined by the custodians of the tradition from Ezedibia village and communicated to a group of elders from the town known as 'Ndi Oha Emeke'. It is a celebration which starts with the clearing of the paths to each constituent community's stream and peaks with merry making, feasting and the chanting of an ancient song known as 'Nwa Uri ala'.

Emekuku shares boundary with the autonomous communities of Emii, Mbaoma, Awaka, Ihitta Ogada, and Enyiogugu Mbaise.

One of the interesting festivals from Emekuku village is called the Uguzo festival. The festival is a three-week period of peace and festivities preceding the planting season.

== Notable people ==
- Anthony John Valentine Obinna, (born 1946) bishop of Owerri
- Sebastian Okechukwu Mezu – Nigerian writer, scholar, philanthropist, publisher, and politician
- Late Nze'n'Ozo Cyril Eromnini Obi, until his death the traditional prime minister of Emekuku (Nze'n'Ozo Eromnini Obi retired from Golden Guinea Breweries Umuahia as the Personnel Manager and was a radio personality on issues relating Igbo traditions and culture.)
- Eze Peter Ugochukwu Obi. Rulership of the (Kingdom) of Ezemba Emekeukwu has traditionally been that of the Obi Royal family starting from Warrant-Chief Obi Ejeshi Ajuku Abuba, to Chief Keligogo Amadi Obi II, then Eze Peter Ugochukwu obi III, Ezeukwu of Ezemba who just passed in late 2017. A new traditional ruler has emerged in Ezemba who has been officially given Staff of office and crowned on Easter Monday 13 April 2020 as His Royal Majesty Eze Obi Ejeshi IV Ezeukwu of Ezemba.
- Hon Paddy Obinna, Imo State Special Adviser on Arts and Culture.
- Hon Comrade Chiagozie Obinna, former Imo State House of Assembly aspirant.
