= Akalovo =

Village in Imo state, Nigeria

Coordinates: 5°28′22″N 7°07′07″E

Akalovo is a village in southeastern Nigeria. It is in Imo state in the Owerri North local government area.

Akalovo is located near the city of Owerri.
