= Imo River =

River of Nigeria

Imo River Imo
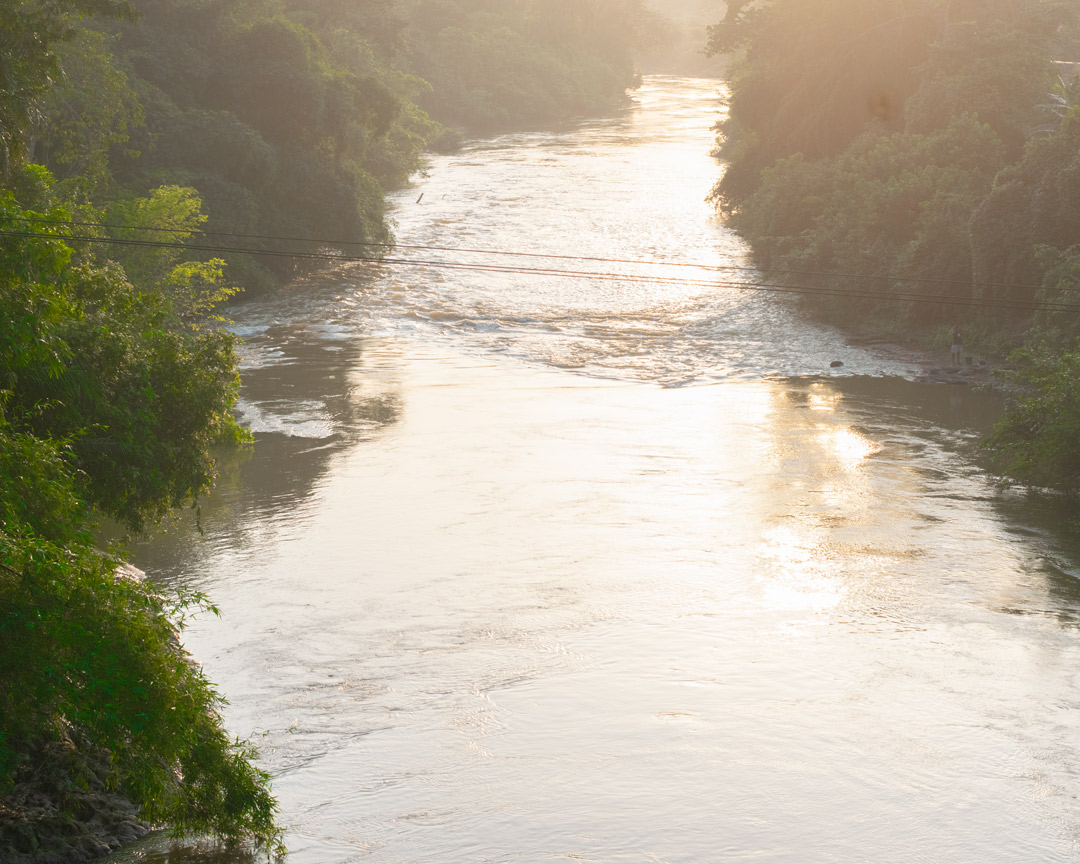
- Imo river from the top of road bridge that lead to Umuahia in Abia state
- Etymology: Named after the Imo alusi

Location
- Country: Nigeria

Physical characteristics
- Source
  - location: Okigwe, Imo State
  - coordinates: 5°50′56″N 7°14′20″W
- Mouth: Atlantic Ocean
  - location: Eastern Obolo, Akwa Ibom State
  - coordinates: 4°28′14″N 7°35′38″W
  - elevation: 0 ft (0 m)
- Length: 150 mi (240 km)

The Imo River (Igbo:Imo) is a major inter-state river system located in southeastern Nigeria, flowing 240 kilometres (150 mi) from its source in Imo State through Abia, Rivers, and Akwa Ibom states before emptying into the Atlantic Ocean. Its estuary is around 40 kilometres (25 mi) wide, and the river has an annual discharge of 4 cubic kilometres (1.0 mi^{3}) with 26,000 ha (100 sq mi; 64,000 acres) of wetland.

== Name and Cultural Significance ==
In Akwa Ibom State, the Imo River is known as Imoh River or Inyang Imoh which translates to River of Wealth (Ibibio: Inyang means river or ocean, and Imoh means wealth). Among the Igbo people, the Igbo deity, or Alusi, of the river is the female Imo, who communities surrounding the river honour as the owner of the river. A festival for the Alusi is held annually between May and July.

== History ==
The Imo River has played a crucial role in the development of inter-group relations, trade, and livelihoods in the region since precolonial times, connecting coastal and inland communities. The watershed was cleared further under the British colonial administration of Nigeria in 1907–1908 and 1911; first to Aba and then to Udo near Umuahia to expand trade routes.

== Geography ==
Many smaller streams feed into the larger hydrological network of Imo River system, perennially and seasonally. Key tributary rivers include the Otamiri and Oramirukwa. Imo River also features an 830-metre (2,720 ft) bridge at the crossing between Rivers State and Akwa Ibom State.

== Pollution ==
Imo river was reported by the World Health Organization as one of the most polluted rivers in Nigeria. Different strategies to address pollution of Imo River and its tributaries have been attempted by the Imo State Water and Sewerage Corporation (ISWSC), civil society organizations like the Open Arms Initiative for Sustainable Development (OPAISD), various Urban Renewal projects, regional collaborations like the Anambra-Imo River Basin Development Authority (AIRBDA), and the World Bank. Efforts have included infrastructure upgrades, water treatment schemes, flood and erosion control measures, and heightened enforcement against indiscriminate dumping and building structures along riverbanks.

== Gallery ==
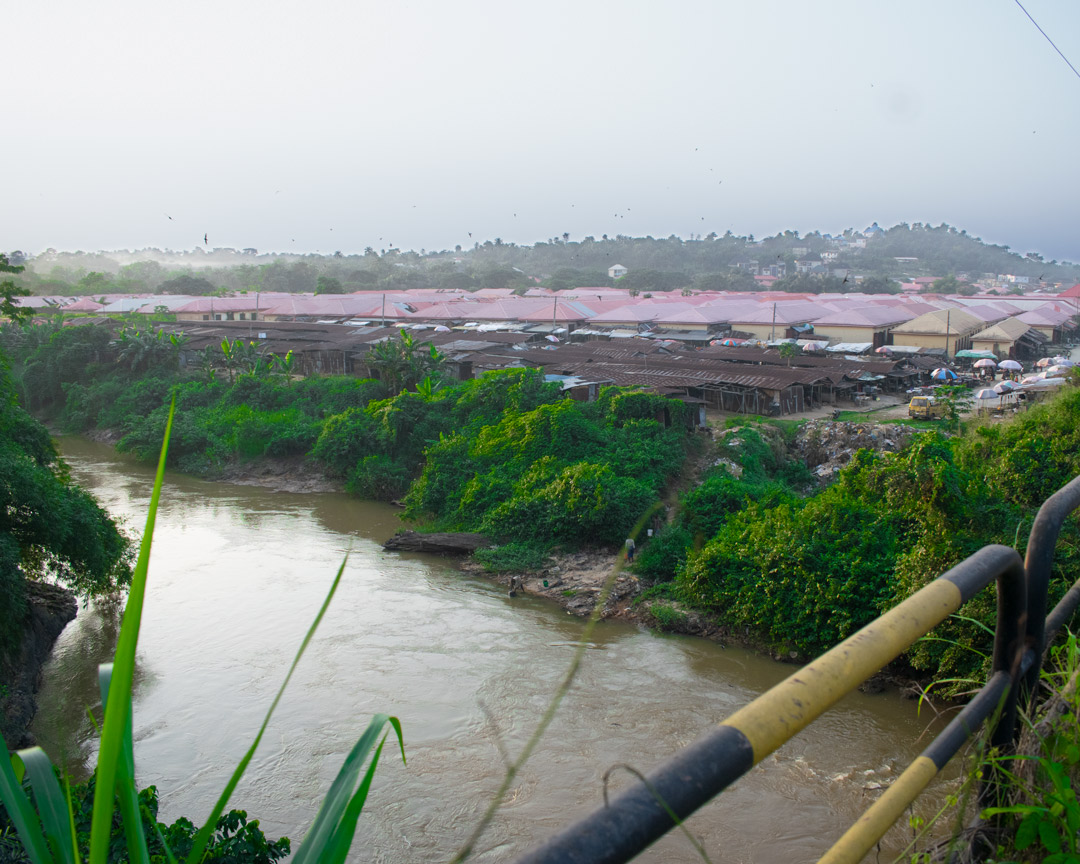
Showing river banks with vegetation and surrounding market building called Malaysian Market

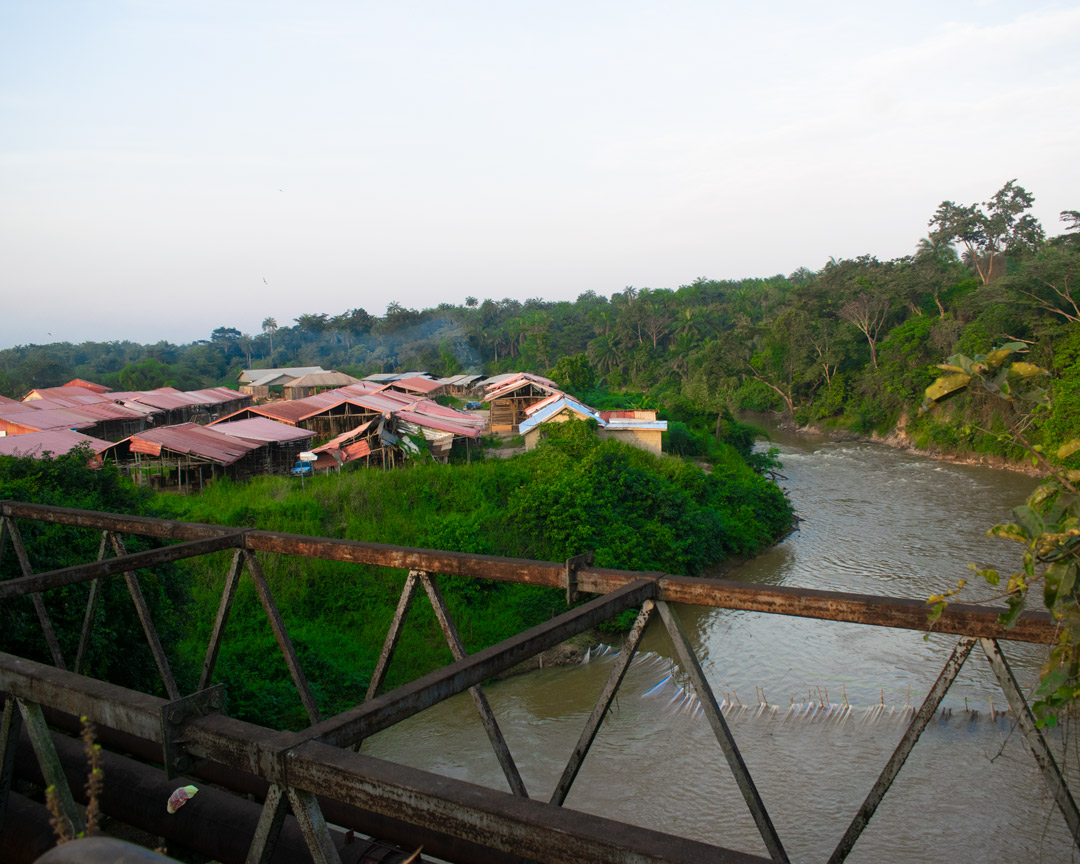
Sub-section for timber that is close to the Imo River.
