= Behind the Rising Sun =

Behind the Rising Sun may refer to:

- Behind the Rising Sun (film), a 1943 American war film
- Behind the Rising Sun (novel), a 1971 war novel by Sebastian Okechukwu Mezu
