= Kingsley Amuneke =

Nigerian footballer (born 1980)

Personal information
- Date of birth: 26 July 1980 (age 46)
- Place of birth: Eziobodo, Nigeria
- Height: 1.75 m (5 ft 9 in)
- Position: Centre-back

Youth career
- Julius Berger

Senior career*
| Years | Team | Apps | (Gls) |
| 1996–2000 | Eendracht Aalst | 16 | (0) |
| 1999–2000 | → Denderhoutem (loan) | | |
| 2000–2002 | Denderhoutem | | |
| 2002–2003 | Fornos de Algodres | | |
| 2003–2004 | Mangualde | | |
| 2004–2006 | Landskrona BoIS | 11 | (0) |
| 2007 | IFK Värnamo | | |
| 2008–2010 | Asmundtorps IF | | |
| 2011 | 07 Vestur | 14 | (0) |
- * Club domestic league appearances and goals

Kingsley Amuneke (born 26 July 1980) Nigerian former footballer who played as a centre-back.

== Football career ==
Born in Eziobodo, Amuneke played professionally for two clubs in Belgium and for Landskrona BoIS in the Swedish Allsvenskan. He is the younger brother of Emmanuel Amunike, and the older sibling of another footballer, Kevin Amuneke; all three spent some time playing in Portugal.
