= Kanayo Onyemaechi =

Nigerian Politician

Member of the Imo State House of Assembly
- Constituency: Owerri West Constituency

Personal details
- Born: Imo State, Nigeria
- Party: All Progressives Congress (APC)
- Occupation: Politician

Kanayo Onyemaechi (born 25 May 1969) is a Nigerian politician and member of the Imo State House of Assembly, representing the Owerri West Constituency under the platform of All Progressives Congress (APC) and currently serves as the Majority Leader of the House.

== Political career ==
Onyemaechi was first elected to the Imo State House of Assembly in 2019. He was re-elected and appointed as the Majority Leader, where he has been actively involved in legislative affairs.

In May 2025, he proposed an amendment to the Imo State Security Organization Law, originally enacted in 2021. The amendment allowed for the inclusion of local vigilante groups into the state’s security framework in response to rising insecurity in rural areas.

He also led the effort to repeal the Imo State Housing Corporation Edict of 1976, replacing it with a modern housing development law aimed at encouraging public-private partnerships.

== Previous appointment ==
Before his election to the Imo State House of Assembly, Onyemaechi served as the Chief of Staff to Jerry Alagbaoso, who represented the Orlu/Orsu/Oru East Federal Constituency in the Nigerian House of Representatives.
