= Ballynure Old Boys F.C. =

Association football club in Northern Ireland

Ballynure Old Boys
- Full name: Ballynure Old Boys Football Club
- Nickname: The Nure
- Founded: 1969
- Ground: Parkview
- Chairman: Angus Henry
- Manager: Michael Duff
- League: Ballymena & Provincial Football League
Home colours

Ballynure Old Boys Football Club, also known as Ballynure O.B., is an intermediate-level football club playing in the Premier division of the Ballymena & Provincial League in Northern Ireland. The club was founded in 1969. As well as the 1st team, the club also has 2nd team playing in the Junior Division 2 of the league. The club is based in Ballynure, County Antrim, but plays its home matches at Parkview Hockey Club.

Nigerian former Benfica striker Kevin Amuneke was briefly signed with the team.

== Honours ==
=== Intermediate honours ===
- Ballymena & Provincial Intermediate League: 2
  - 2007–08, 2014–15
