= Nekede =

Town in Imo State, Nigeria

Nekede is a town in southeastern Nigeria. It is located near the city of Owerri. This is an Igbo speaking town that is made up of three distinct towns, viz Umualum, Umudibia, and Umuoma. Nekede also hosts the Imo State new Owerri capital territory popularly known as new Owerri. Federal University of Technology Owerri is 20 minutes drive from Nekede. It lies on the junction of the Nworie River and the Otamiri River. The population of Nekede is fast developing into a city with increasing population due to the citing of the Federal Polytechnic, Nekede, a federal government-owned higher institution.
