= Sebastian Okechukwu Mezu =

Nigerian writer, scholar, philanthropist (born 1941)

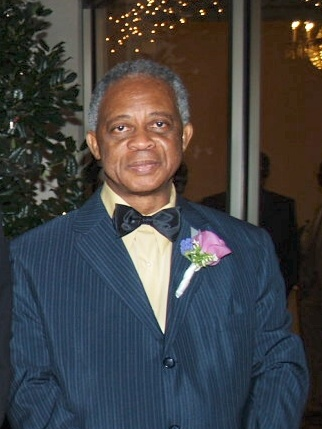

Chairman, Imo State Nigerian Peoples Party
- In office June 1978 – 1979

Chairman, Imo Newspapers
- In office 1980–1981

Personal details
- Born: April 30, 1941 (age 85) Emekuku, Owerri, Imo State, Nigeria
- Party: Congress for Progressive Change
- Spouse: Dr. Rose Mezu
- Education: B.A. in French, LL.B., M.A. & Ph.D in Romance Languages

Dr Sebastian Okechukwu Mezu // (born April 30, 1941) is a Nigerian writer, scholar, philanthropist, and publisher. He was involved in politics in Nigeria in the late 1970s.

== Background ==
Sebastian Okechukwu Mezu was born on April 30, 1941, in Ezeogba, Emekuku, Owerri, Imo State. He received a B.A. in French (1964) with minors in German and Philosophy from Georgetown University. He obtained an LL.B. in 1966 from La Salle Extension University, Chicago, and an M.A. (1966), Ph.D (1967) in Romance Languages from Johns Hopkins University, Baltimore, Maryland.

== Diplomatic service ==
When the Biafran war broke out in 1967, due to the recognition of his valuable contributions and activism as a young scholar in the United States, where he had voluntarily translated volumes of documents for his country into French and other languages, Mezu was appointed Biafran Government Special Representative and Ambassador to Abidjan, Ivory Coast, at the age of 27 by Colonel C. Odumegwu Ojukwu and was charged with affairs in Francophone and Anglophone West Africa.

Mezu was the co-founder and Deputy Director of the Biafra Historical Research Center, Paris, July 1967 – July 1968, then Biafra's semi-official diplomatic mission to France and Europe. He was Biafran delegate and French expert to various peace delegations including to Ivory Coast (President Félix Houphouët-Boigny), Senegal, (President Leopold Sedar Senghor), Gabon (President Albert Bernard Bongo), and was Biafran delegate and French expert to various peace conferences in Niamey, Niger Republic (President Hamani Diori, 1968) and in Addis-Ababa, Ethiopia (Emperor Haile Selassie, 1968).

== Black Academy Press ==
In 1969 Mezu established Black Academy Press, Inc, in Buffalo, New York, one of the first black-owned academic publishing companies that set the tone for Africana studies in the 1960s in the US. Black Academy Press remains one of the longest standing historic black publishing companies today.

== Political career ==
In the 1970s, Mezu founded the Imo State branch of the Nigerian Peoples Party (NPP) and as Secretary of the NPP he installed and helped to elect to office Governor Samuel Onunaka Sam Mbakwe and other notable names. Following the success of the NPP at the polls, Mezu became Chairman of the Golden Breweries Limited (1979–80), rehabilitating and revitalizing the brewery during a $50 million expansion; and as chairman of Imo State Newspapers Ltd where he raised the daily circulation of the Nigerian Statesman from 50,000 to 150,000.

He was Campaign Director, Party Secretary and principal architect of the NPP, which won a landslide victory (over 80%) in the Imo State Legislative, Gubernatorial and Presidential Elections in Nigeria in 1979.

== Selected bibliography ==
- The Philosophy of Pan-Africanism, editor. Washington, D.C., Georgetown University Press, 1965, 142 pp.
- The Tropical Dawn (poems), Baltimore, Maryland, 1966; Buffalo, NY: Black Academy Press, Inc., 1970, 60 p.
- Leopold Sédar Senghor et la défense et illustration de la civilisation noire, Paris: Marcel Didier, 1968, 232 pp.
- Black Leaders of the Centuries, editor, with Ram Desai. Buffalo: Black Academy Press, 1970, 302 pp.
- Behind the Rising Sun (novel about the Biafran war). London, William Heinemann, 1971, 242p; paperback (African Writers Series, No. 113) London, Heinemann Educational Books, 1972.
- Modern Black Literature, editor. Buffalo: Black Academy Press, 1971
- The Literary Works of Senghor, London Heinemann Educational Books, 1972, 121 pp.
- Igbo Market Literature, compiler. 5 vols, Buffalo: Black Academy Press, 1972, 4000 pp.
- The Meaning of Africa to Afro-Americans: A Comparative Study Of Race & Racism, editor. Buffalo: Black Academy Press, 1972, 175 pp.
- Umu Ejima (The Twins). An Igbo adaptation of the Latin play Menaechmi by Plautus. Owerri: Black Academy Press, 1975, 60 pp.
- Leopold Sedar Senghor. London: Heinemann, 1973.
- Ken Saro-Wiwa: The Life and Times, editor. Baltimore, Black Academy Press, Inc. 1996.
