= Akachi Monument =

Monument in Owerri, Nigeria

Coordinates: 5.4685°N 7.0414°E

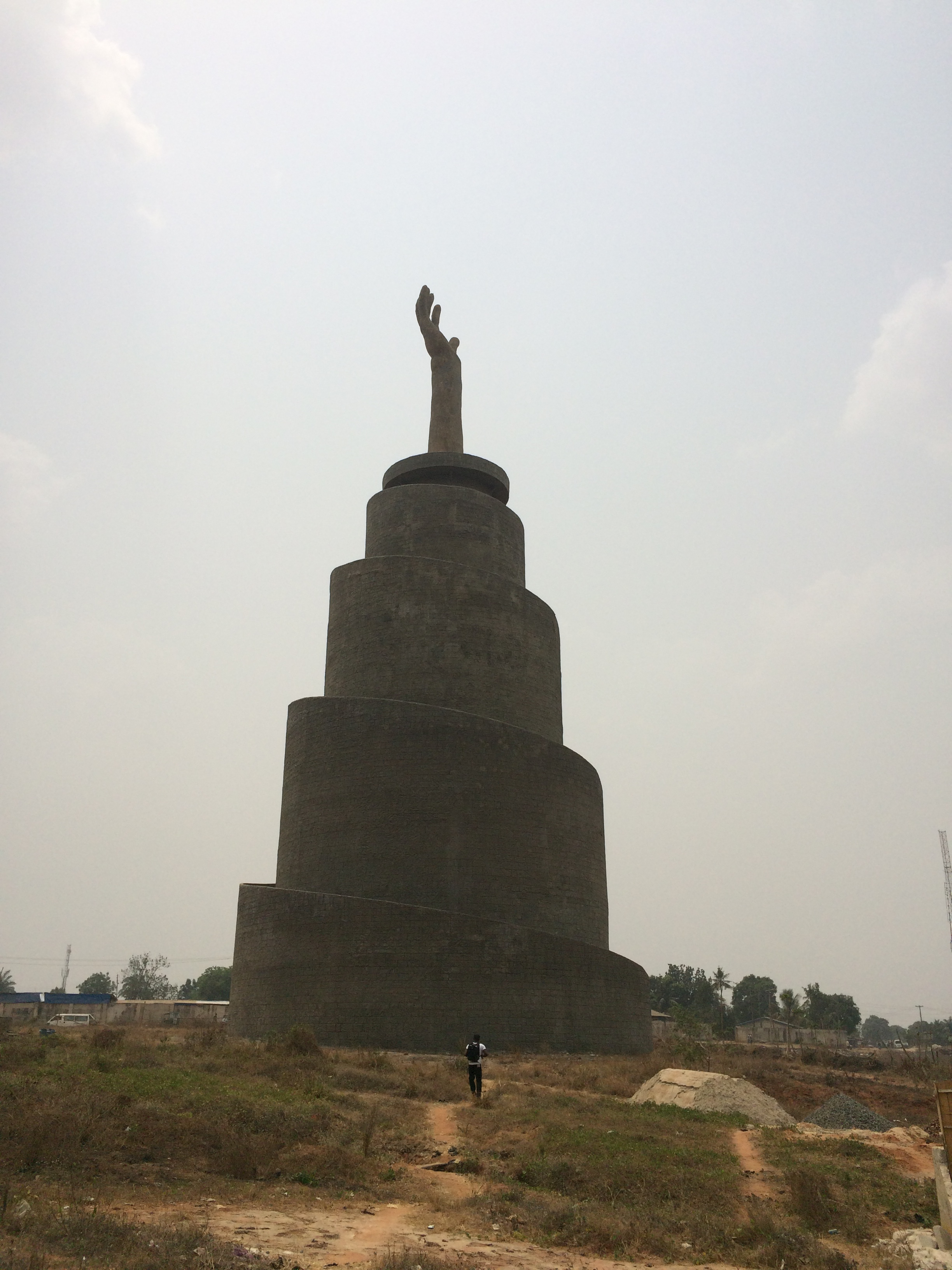
Akachi Monument, Owerri, Imo State, Nigeria

The Akachi monument was a towering sculpture located along Aba Road in Owerri, Imo State, in southeastern Nigeria. Built on a reclaimed dumpsite, the structure stood over 40 feet tall. It featured a prominent hand symbol at its peak, representing the "hand of God." The monument was intended as a tourist attraction.

It was considered during the administration of former governor of Imo State, Rochas Okorocha and was officially commissioned by Vice President Yemi Osinbajo. On 30 May 2019, the monument was demolished using earth-moving equipment under the administration of Emeka Ihedioha, who succeeded Okorocha as governor that year.
