= Egbu =

Village in Imo State

Egbu is a town in Owerri North Local Government Area of Imo state in southern Nigeria, located on the Otamiri River near the city of Owerri. Egbu is among the brother clans in owerri known as "Ala Enyi" including; Ihitta Ogada, Awaka, Owerri Nchi Ise and Naze. Egbu is linked to other towns and villages by the Owerri–Umuahia road.

The town of Egbu consists of five villages: Umuofor, Mpama, Umuayalu, Ofeuzo and Ishiuzo. Egbu is bordered by Owerri, Awaka and Naze. The town is close to the capital city of Owerri. Egbu is led by EZE Ochoromma V1 of Egbu, the only traditional leader in the community. Egbu is the first physical source of Otamiri River which flows to Owerri Nchi Ise, Nekede, Ihiagwa and then pass through many other communities in IMO State to Rivers State. In 1906 to 1912, Egbu is where Thomas Dennis of the Church Missionary Society and his co-workers, under CMS now Anglican Church translated the first Ibo bible. Presently All Saints Cathedral Egbu.
