= Ihitte Ogwa =

Village in Owerri, Imo State, Nigeria

Ihitte Ogwa is a village in southeastern Nigeria located near the city of Owerri, Imo State.
