= Kevin Amuneke =

Nigerian footballer (born 1986)

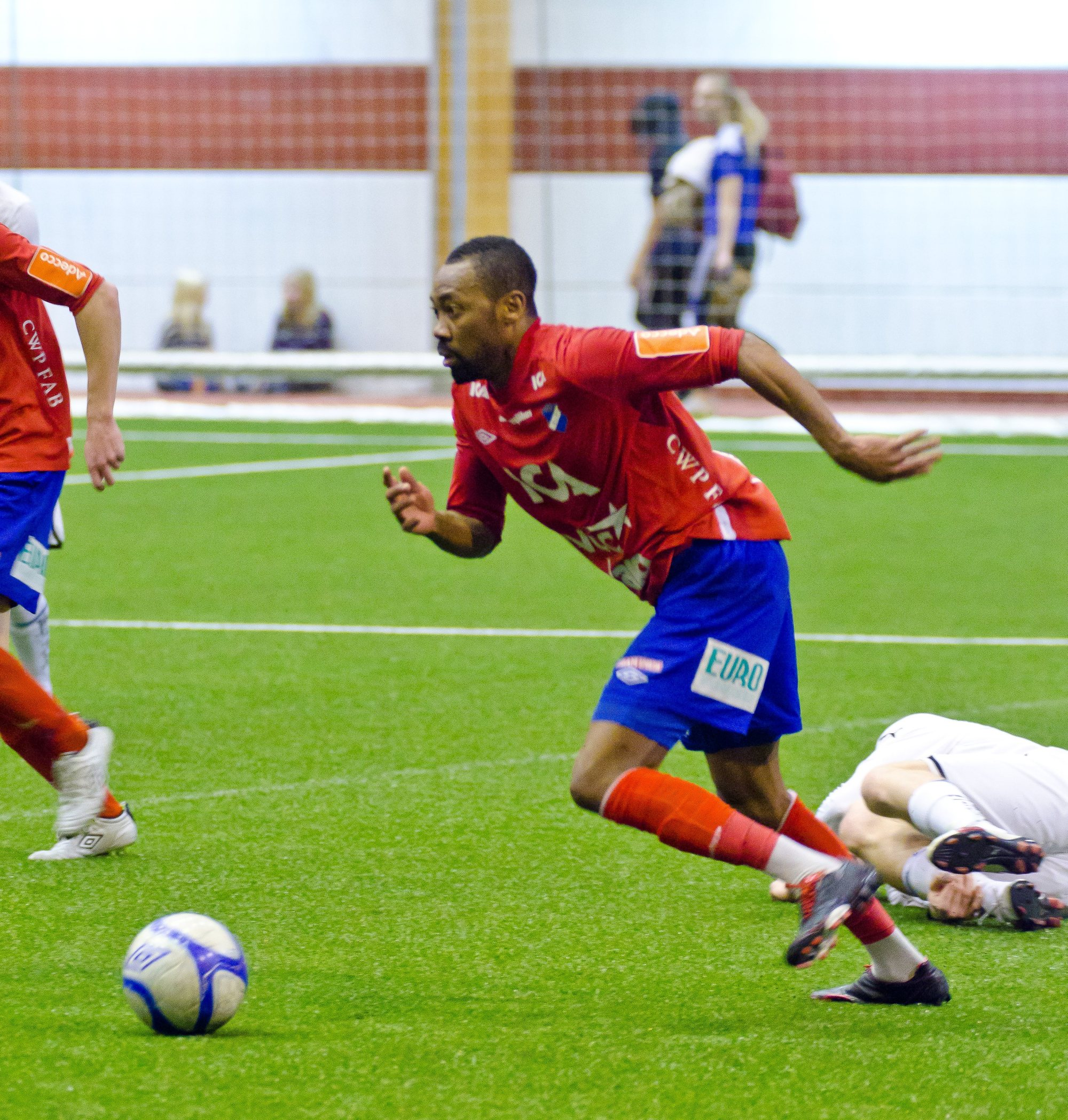
- Amuneke playing for Öster in 2012.

Personal information
- Full name: Kevin Onyekachi Amuneke
- Date of birth: 10 May 1986 (age 40)
- Place of birth: Eziobodo, Nigeria
- Height: 1.79 m (5 ft 10 in)
- Position: Forward

Youth career
- Soccer Warriors
- 1999–2002: Benfica
- 2002–2003: Porto

Senior career*
| Years | Team | Apps | (Gls) |
| 2003 | Porto B | 6 | (0) |
| 2004–2006 | Landskrona BoIS | 48 | (16) |
| 2006–2007 | Vitória Setúbal | 28 | (4) |
| 2007 | CSKA Sofia | 10 | (2) |
| 2008 | IFK Norrköping | 27 | (6) |
| 2009 | Politehnica Timişoara | 2 | (0) |
| 2009–2011 | Nacional | 16 | (2) |
| 2011–2012 | Öster | 12 | (2) |
| 2013 | Trelleborg | 4 | (0) |
| 2013 | Tondela | 1 | (0) |
| 2014 | Sloboda Užice | 4 | (0) |
| 2015 | IS Halmia | 13 | (4) |
| 2016 | Ballynure Old Boys | 8 | (12) |
| 2017 | Linfield | 2 | (0) |
| 2017 | Portadown | 9 | (5) |

International career
| 2005 | Nigeria | 2 | (0) |
- * Club domestic league appearances and goals

Kevin Onyekachi Amuneke (born 10 May 1986) is a Nigerian former professional footballer who played as a forward. He spent most of his professional career in Europe, mainly in Portugal and Sweden.

== Club career ==
Amuneke was born in Eziobodo. After starting out at Benfica and Porto, representing only the youth teams in the first case and the youths and the reserves in the second, he began his professional career in Sweden with Landskrona BoIS (where he played alongside brother Kingsley) and, after two years, returned to Portugal, appearing for Vitória de Setúbal in the Primeira Liga.

On 21 May 2007, after cancelling out his contract unilaterally, Amuneke agreed to join CSKA Sofia in Bulgaria for about €400,000. However, he returned to Sweden in December of the same year to play for IFK Norrköping in the top level – the transfer fee was this time reported as €300,000.

After a brief stint in Romania with Politehnica Timişoara, Amuneke moved back to Portugal, signing with Madeira's Nacional in early July 2009. Not having been used at all during the first part of the 2010–11 season, he was released by the club, resuming his career with Öster in the Superettan.

Amuneke rarely settled in the following years, representing in quick succession Trelleborg (Sweden), Tondela (Portugal), Sloboda Užice (Serbia) and IS Halmia (Sweden). On 21 December 2016, after a stint at Ballynure Old Boys of the Ballymena & Provincial Football League, he moved to the NIFL Premiership having agreed to a short-term deal at Linfield.

== International career ==
Amuneke won two caps for Nigeria, both during the 2006 FIFA World Cup qualifiers, featuring against Rwanda and Angola in June 2005.

== Personal life ==
Amuneke's older brothers, Emmanuel and Kingsley, were also footballers. The former, a winger, played amongst others for Sporting CP and FC Barcelona, and was also a Nigerian international.

== Honours ==
CSKA Sofia

- Bulgarian First League: 2007–08

Linfield

- Northern Ireland League: 2016–17
- Irish Cup: 2016–17
