= Nworie River =

River on Nigeria

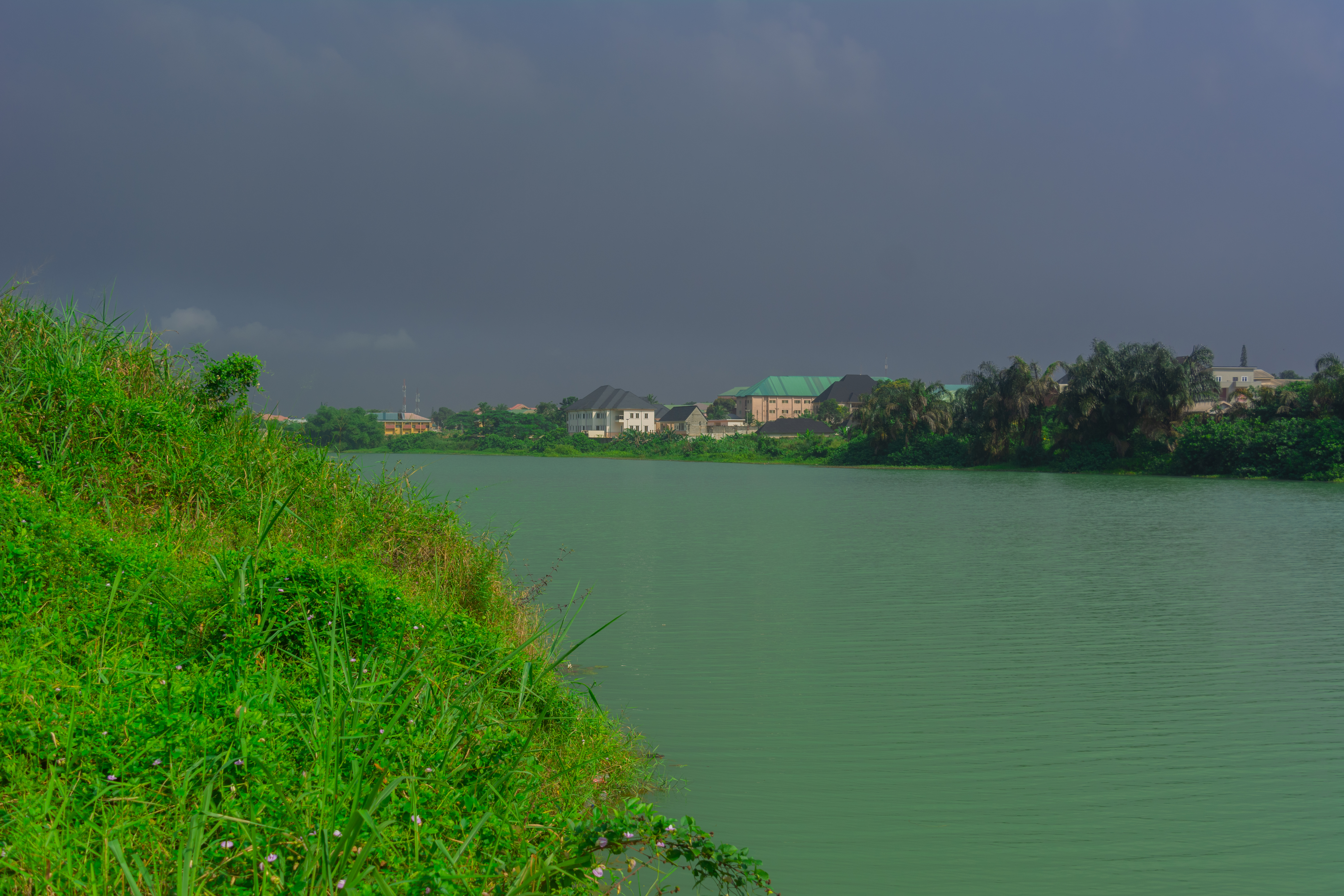
Showing some of the buildings around the river.

The Nworie River is a river in Nigeria that passes through Owerri and drains into the Otamiri River at Nekede. The length of the river from its source to its confluence is 9.2 km. The river is heavily polluted; in 2017 the local government issued warnings against using water from the river. In order to increase the state's supply of electricity, the formal President of Nigeria, Muhammadu Buhari approved the conceptual design of a proposed power producing facility near the Nworie River in Owerri, the capital of Imo.

== Pollution ==
Alexander Nwaozuzu Acholonu, a professor of biology from Awaka, in the Imo State, emphasized that a study on the potability of Nworie River had warned Imo people to avoid contact with it, stressing that it could be harmful to health as it is no longer safe for consumption.
