= Chokocho =

- Chokocho shown within Nigeria
- Coordinates: 4.990833°N 7.054444°E
- Country: Nigeria
- State: Rivers State
- Local Government Area: Etche
- Time zone: UTC+1 (CET/WAT)

Chokocho is a community in Etche Local Government Area in Rivers State, Nigeria near the Otamiri River. It has a population of about 18000 residents. The Chokocho bridge across the Otamiri, damaged during the Nigerian Civil War, was rebuilt during the governorship of Peter Odili. The bridge on the Igwuruta – Okehi – Okpalla road is 60m x 11m (4 spans of 15m each), built by Setraco Nigeria Ltd and completed in December 2002. In March 2008, Ephraim Nwuzi of the Etche Local Government Area said he was going to complete "abandoned projects" like the cottage hospital at Chokocho.

The Global Memorandum of Understanding initiated in 2005 by Shell Producing Company has provided development funds, administered by the Etche One Cluster Development Foundation. In 2007, the people of Chokocho chose to rehabilitate their water facilities and install electricity supply to the entire community. In August 2009, the foundation commissioned six rooms of lock-up shops in Chokocho Community.

Random sand samples from the bank of Otamiri River between Chokocho and Umuanyaga, Etche Local Government Area, Rivers State showed that 86% of the sand particles are within the ideal range for glass making.
