= Behind the Rising Sun (novel) =

1971 book by Sebastian Okechukwu Mezu

- Black Academy Press, Inc. edition
- Author: Sebastian Okechukwu Mezu
- Language: English
- Genre: war fiction
- Publisher: Heinemann
- Publication date: 1971
- Publication place: Nigeria
- Media type: Print (Paperback)
- Pages: 241 pp
- ISBN: 978-0435901134

Behind the Rising Sun is a 1971 war novel by Nigerian novelist and politician Sebastian Okechukwu Mezu. It was first published in 1971 by Heinemann, and later reprinted in 1972 as part of the African Writers Series. The novel explores the events of the Nigerian Civil War. The novel was considered the first novel about the war from a Biafran perspective. It suggests that the Nigerian victory in the war was not due to an aptitude by the Nigerian forces, but by the ineptitude of Biafran ability.

Book critic, Wendy Griswold described the novel as "awkwardly constructed" and highlighting a sharp contrast between the novels's artificial ending and "realistic" depictions of suffering during the war.
