= Awaka =

Town in Imo state, Nigeria

Awaka is a town about four miles north-east of Owerri, capital city of Imo State, southeastern Nigeria.

Awaka shares borders with Umuorii Uratta, Ezeogba Emekuku and Umuawuka Emii. Popularly referred to as "Ancient Town", Awaka is largely known for corn production.
