= Owerri West =

- LGA
- Interactive map of Owerri West
- Country: Nigeria
- State: Imo State
- Capital: Umuguma

Government
  - Local Government Chairman: Victor Osigwe
  - Member of State House of Assembly: Kanayo Onyemaechi

Area
  - Total: 295 km^{2} (114 sq mi)

Population (2006)
  - Total: 99,265
  - Density: 336/km^{2} (872/sq mi)
- Time zone: UTC+1 (WAT)
- Postal code: 460

Owerri West is a Local Government Area of Imo State, Nigeria. Its headquarters are in the town of Umuguma. Owerri West Local Government is administered under the terms of the Constitution of the Federal Republic of Nigeria. Elections to the office of the Chairman of the local government are held through nominations by registered political parties as stipulated by the constitution of the Federal Republic of Nigeria, under the supervision of Imo State Electoral Commission. Owerri West was carved out of the former Owerri Local Government Area in 1996. A very large portion of the local government constitute the capital city of Imo State, Nigeria.

It has an area of 295 km^{2} (114 sq mi) and a population of 99,265 at the 2006 census.

== Climate ==
Owerri has a tropical climate, which is what distinguishes its climatic characteristics. In Owerri, there is a brief dry season and significant monthly rainfall. The region's typical climate is designated as Am by the Köppen-Geiger classification system. 25.9 °C (78.6 °F) is Owerri's typical yearly temperature. 2412 millimeters / 95 inches of precipitation fall here annually.

In the northern hemisphere, you can find Owerri. September through June are considered summer months. July, August, and September are the months that make up the summer. It is preferable to travel in January, February, March, April, May, and November and December.

The postal code of the area is 460.

== Communities ==
1. Umuguma
2. Avu
3. Okuku
4. Oforola
5. Obinze
6. Nekede
7. Ihiagwa
8. Eziobodo
9. Okolochi
10. Emeabiam
11. Irete
12. Orogwe
13. Amakohia-Ubi
14. Ndegwu
15. Ohii
16. Eziokele

Prominent locations in Owerri West include:

1. Federal Polytechnic Nnekede, Owerri (FPNO)
2. Federal University of Technology Owerri (FUTO)- located at Eziobodo and Ihiagwa as the two major host communities with Okolochi, Obinze and Emeabiam as the minor host communities.
3. Nekede Zoo
4. Nekede Divisional Police
5. Federal Secretariat - located at Umuguma along Port Harcourt Road
6. State Secretariat
7. General Hospital Umuguma
8. World Bank Housing Estates Umuguma, Area L, M, N
9. Federal Housing Estate Umuguma
10. Imo State Housing Estate Umuguma
11. Concorde Hotel
12. OCHIE Microfinance Bank
