= Emmanuel Amunike =

Nigerian football player and manager

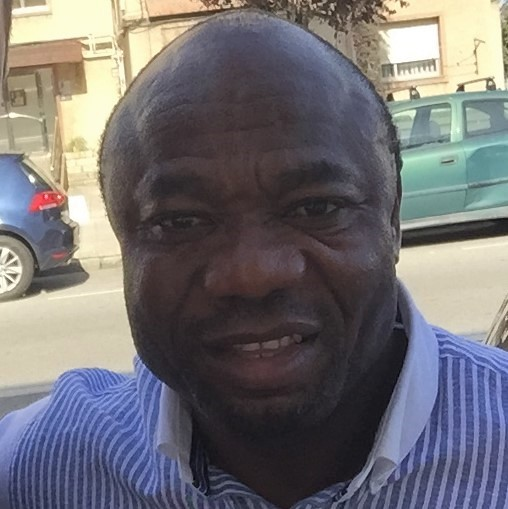
- Amunike in 2017

Personal information
- Date of birth: 25 December 1970 (age 55)
- Place of birth: Eziobodo, Nigeria
- Height: 1.76 m (5 ft 9 in)
- Position: Winger

Team information
- Current team: Nigeria (assistant)

Senior career*
Years	Team	Apps	(Gls)
1990	Concord		
1991	Julius Berger		
1991–1994	Zamalek	71	(26)
1994–1996	Sporting CP	52	(17)
1996–2000	Barcelona	19	(1)
2000–2002	Albacete	17	(1)
2003	Busan i.cons		
2003–2004	Al-Wehdat	12	(3)
2005–2006	Al-Najma	18	(0)

International career
1993–2001	Nigeria	28	(10)

Managerial career
- Reocín (youth)
- 2008: Al Hazm (assistant)
- 2008–2009: Julius Berger
- 2009–2011: Ocean Boys
- 2014–2017: Nigeria U17
- 2017–2018: Al Khartoum
- 2018–2019: Tanzania
- 2020: Misr Lel Makkasa
- 2020-2021: Misr Lel Makkasa (director of academy)
- 2021–2022: Nigeria (assistant)
- 2022: Zanaco
- 2022–2023: Zanaco (consultant)
- 2024–: Heartland
Medal record
Representing Nigeria
Men's football
Africa Cup of Nations
Winner	1994 Tunisia
Runner-up	2000 Ghana–Nigeria
Olympic Games
Gold medal – first place	1996 Atlanta
Men's football
Representing Nigeria (as manager)
FIFA U-17 World Cup
Winner	2015 Chile
- * Club domestic league appearances and goals

Emmanuel Amunike (born 25 December 1970) is a Nigerian professional football manager and former footballer who played as a winger. He played for clubs such as Zamalek, Sporting CP, and Barcelona during his playing career. After retiring, he became a coach and led the Nigeria U-17 national team.

At international level, he made 28 appearances and scored 10 goals for the Nigeria national team. He contributed to Nigeria's victory at the 1994 Africa Cup of Nations and its gold medal win in men's football at the 1996 Summer Olympics.

== Club career ==
Amunike began his professional career in 1990 with Concord and moved to Julius Berger in 1991. Later that year, he joined Egyptian club Zamalek, where he played until 1994. During his time at the club, he won the African Cup of Champions Clubs in 1993 and the CAF Super Cup in 1994.

In 1994, he moved to Portugal to join Sporting CP. He won the Taça de Portugal in the 1994–95 season and the Portuguese Super Cup in 1995, remaining at the club until 1996.

In 1996, he moved to Barcelona. The club had begun pursuing his signing in the summer of that year, and after negotiations, the transfer was finally completed in December. He contributed to Barcelona's victories in the Copa del Rey and the UEFA Cup Winners' Cup in the 1996–97 season. In the 1997–98 season, he won La Liga, the Copa del Rey, and the UEFA Super Cup. He also won La Liga in the 1998–99 season. However, knee injuries limited his playing opportunities, and he left the club at the end of the 1999–2000 season.

In 2000, he joined Albacete, where he spent two seasons in the Segunda División. In the 2000–01 season, he made 11 league appearances and scored one goal, while he made six appearances in the 2001–02 season.

In 2003, he played for South Korean club Busan i.cons before moving to Jordanian club Al-Wehdat. He played in the Jordanian Pro League during the 2003–04 season and subsequently brought his playing career to an end.

== International career ==
Amunike made his debut for the Nigeria national team in 1993. He participated in the qualifying campaigns for the 1994 FIFA World Cup and the 1994 African Cup of Nations. In April 1994, he competed in the 1994 African Cup of Nations in Tunisia, scoring both goals in the final against the Zambia to secure a 2–1 victory. Nigeria won the Africa Cup of Nations for the second time, having previously won the tournament in 1980. In recognition of his performances, Amunike was named African Footballer of the Year in 1994.

Later that year, he represented Nigeria at the 1994 FIFA World Cup, held in the United States. He scored in the group-stage match against the Bulgaria and also opened the scoring against the Italy in the round of 16. Nigeria were eliminated after losing 2–1 to Italy in extra time.

In 1995, Amunike participated in the 1995 King Fahd Cup. He played in the group-stage match against the Japan, the match against the Argentina, and the third-place play-off against the Mexico. In the same year, he came on as a substitute and scored in the second leg of the 1995 Afro-Asian Cup of Nations against the Uzbekistan.

In 1996, Amunike participated in the men's football tournament at the 1996 Summer Olympics as an over-age player for the Nigeria Olympic team. He played in the group-stage matches against Hungary, Japan, and Brazil, as well as the quarter-final against Mexico, the semi-final against Brazil, and the final against Argentina. In the final, he scored the winning goal shortly before the end of the match, securing a 3–2 victory for Nigeria. The country won its first-ever Olympic gold medal in men's football.

Beginning in November 1996, Amunike participated in the African qualifying campaign for the 1998 FIFA World Cup. He played in matches against the Burkina Faso, the Guinea, and the Kenya, helping Nigeria qualify for the tournament. However, a long-term injury to his left knee kept him out of action for an extended period, preventing him from participating in the 1998 FIFA World Cup, held in France.

In 2000, Amunike was included in Nigeria's squad for the 2000 African Cup of Nations. He came on as a substitute in the group-stage match against the Tunisia and the quarter-final against the Senegal, as Nigeria advanced to the final. He did not feature in the final, in which Nigeria drew 2–2 with the Cameroon before losing on penalties and finishing as runners-up.

Amunike made his final appearance for the national team on 13 January 2001, playing against the Zambia in the African qualifying campaign for the 2002 FIFA World Cup.

== Managerial career ==
After retiring at the end of 2004, Amunike moved to Cantabria in 2006, where he lived with his Spanish wife, Fatima, and took coaching courses. At the same time, he was also coaching some youth teams at SD Reocín. After a spell at Saudi club Al Hazm as an assistant coach, Amunike took charge of the local Nigerian club Julius Berger in August 2008.

On 23 December 2008, Amunike took on training duties for some teams in Nigeria, after completing two years of training courses in Europe. In November 2009, he took charge of Ocean Boys.

Amunike coached the Nigeria U17 national team to win the World Cup in 2015. On 6 August 2018, he was appointed as the coach of the Tanzania national team. He managed to qualify for the 2019 Africa Cup of Nations, but he resigned from training the team after losing all three games. In November 2019, he said he was looking for a new job.

Amunike was appointed the manager of Egyptian Premier League club, Misr Lei Makkasa in February 2021. In March 2021, his role was changed to director of academies.

He became assistant coach of the Nigeria national team in February 2022.

== Personal life ==
Amunike's younger brothers, Kingsley and Kevin, have also been footballers. Both also played several years in Portugal, amongst other countries.

== Career statistics ==
No.	Date	Venue	Opponent	Score	Result	Competition
1.	23 April 1993	Lagos, Nigeria	Sudan	2–0	4–0	1994 African Cup of Nations qualification
2.	23 April 1993	Lagos, Nigeria	Sudan	4–0	4–0	1994 African Cup of Nations qualification
3.	10 April 1994	Tunis, Tunisia	Zambia	1–1	2–1	1994 African Cup of Nations
4.	10 April 1994	Tunis, Tunisia	Zambia	2–1	2–1	1994 African Cup of Nations
5.	21 June 1994	Dallas, United States	Bulgaria	3–0	3–0	1994 FIFA World Cup
6.	5 July 1994	Foxborough, United States	Italy	1–0	1–2 (a.e.t.)	1994 FIFA World Cup
7.	10 November 1995	Lagos, Nigeria	Uzbekistan	1–0	1–0	1995 Afro-Asian Cup of Nations
8.	27 April 1997	Ouagadougou, Burkina Faso	Burkina Faso	2–0	2–1	1998 FIFA World Cup qualification
9.	7 June 1997	Lagos, Nigeria	Kenya	2–0	3–0	1998 FIFA World Cup qualification

== Honours ==
=== Player ===
Julius Berger

- Nigerian Professional Football League: 1991

Zamalek

- Egyptian Premier League: 1991–92, 1992–93
- African Cup of Champions Clubs: 1993
- CAF Super Cup: 1994

Sporting CP

- Taça de Portugal: 1994–95
- Supertaça Cândido de Oliveira: 1995

Barcelona

- Copa del Rey: 1996–97

Nigeria

- Africa Cup of Nations: 1994; runner-up: 2000
- Olympic Games: 1996

Individual

- African Footballer of the Year: 1994
- BBC African Footballer of the Year: 1996

=== Manager ===
Nigeria U17

- FIFA U-17 World Cup: 2015
