= Oramiriukwa River =

River in Nigeria

Oramiriukwa River is a stream in Imo State, Nigeria that runs a 14-kilometre (9 mi) course to drain into the Otamiri River. Oramiriukwa one of the Rivers found in Imo Riverdrainage runs roughly a 14 km (8.7 mi) course from its headwaters in Abba Isu (Nwangele LGA) and releases into Otamiri Waterway. In view of the fish gets of neighborhood anglers involving an assortment of fishing gear in an examining station in Emekuku (Owerri LGA), a sum of 17 groups of fish comprising 27 species were distinguished in the waterway.
