= Eziobodo =

Eziobodo is an ancient kingdom located in today's Owerri West local government, Imo State, Nigeria. Eziobodo is an igbo-speaking community with a population of over 15,000 locals.

Eziobodo is also known as Alueze or Alu-eze as this was the ancient name of the community before the colonial arrival of the former British Empire and Warrant Chiefs that followed much later around the 1930s. The town is made up of four villages namely; Eziobo (the descendants of the first son), Umuayo village, Umuokele village and Umuezeala. There is a fifth village battling for independence from Umuokele village called Umuechem (now independent) but they are grouped as one entity most of the time.

The town hosts the Federal University of Technology Owerri - FUTO. There is a misconception that a neighboring village Ihiagwa is the host community of FUTO but that is not true as Eziobodo accounts for over 70% of the landmass of Federal University of Technology Owerri.

The town is also known for agricultural produce such as cassava, Fluted pumpkin (Ugu), cocoyam, maize, and palm oil. The Otamiri river crosses through Umuayo and Eziobo villages.

The traditional stool, and the traditional leadership responsibility in Eziobodo autonomous community, is a right reserved for the OKOROAGBARA royal family from Umuezeala. An application and attempt to split Eziobodo into two autonomous communities was approved by the Imo State Government (His Excellency Rochas Okorocha). The autonomous is known as Eziokele headed by HRH Richard Ngozi Osuji ( Eze-Udo 1 of Eziokele).

== Notable people ==
Notable people of Eziobodo include Eze Lucky Ndubueze Okoroagbara (Eze and Custodian of Traditional Institution), Eze Richard Ngozi Osuji (Eze Udo), Kelly Hansome (musician), Chief Osinachi MBA (Chief Osie), Senator, Emmanuel Amuneke, Chief Alwel Nwakali, Ekeh Emeka Bright (a computer guru/Administrator, FUTO - aka takeover), Chidiebere Nwakali - (Former U17 World cup winner in 2013), Kelechi Nwakali (Former U17 World cup winner in 2015) played for Arsenal Football club in England, Chukwudi Agor (Former U17 World cup winner in 2015), Miss Ego, former singer for popular musician Lagbaja, Emeka Bethel, CEO Bensoft Enterprise and Linux/open source activist in Nigeria, Mr. Charles Emeto (Ipweb Venture), Sir Bobby owner of Bobby's signature - The beautician for former miss world winner Agbani Derego in 2001, Dr. Steve Eke-Okoroagabra MD, CEO Doctors Charity, Eke Chileobi Godanswer (B.Tech, M.Sc and PhD (In-view)-A Research Scientist at the SHEDA Science and Technology Abuja, under the Federal Ministry of Science, Innovation and Technology) Inc. Chief Ndubuisi Uchehara (president NULGE, NLC).

- Emmanuel Amuneke

== Organizations ==
Religious organizations in Eziobodo/Eziokele includes: St Marks Anglican Church, St Mary's Catholic Church, Baptist Church, Overcomers, Redeem Pilgrim, Christian Penticostal Mission (Grace Cathedral), Redeeming, Cherubim and Seraphim, Deeper Life, Watchman Charismatic, Christ Apostolic Church, Jehovah's Witnesses.

Social Clubs include Ndioma Kings and Friends Social Club (Kings Club) Senate Club of Nigeria, United Brothers Club, Great Achiever Club, Royal Eagle Club
