= Owerri North =

LGA in Imo State, Nigeria

- LGA
- Interactive map of Owerri North
- Country: Nigeria
- State: Imo State
- Capital: Orie Uratta

Government
  - Local Government Chairman: Lucky Abaraonye

Area
  - Total: 198 km^{2} (76 sq mi)

Population (2006)
  - Total: 175,395
  - Density: 886/km^{2} (2,290/sq mi)
- Time zone: UTC+1 (WAT)
- Postal code: 460

Owerri North is a Local Government Area of Imo State, Nigeria. Its headquarters are in the town of Orie Uratta. It has an area of 198 square kilometres (76 mi^{2}) and a population of 175,395 at the 2006 census. The postal code of the area is 460. Owerri North is semi-urban government area. It encircles Owerri Municipal like a peninsula. Six major roads that lead out of the municipal cuts across Owerri North Communities. In the North, Orlu road leads to Amakaohia and Akwakuma communities. In the East, Okigwe road leads to Orji Community. In the West, MCC road off Wetheral to Obibi Uratta and Ihitaoha communities. In the South, Mbaise road leads to Egbu and Emekuku communities, while Aba road leads to Naze, Agbala and Ulakwo communities.
