= Owerri =

Capital city of Imo State, Nigeria

Owerri Owèrrè / Chukwukadibia (Igbo)
- City
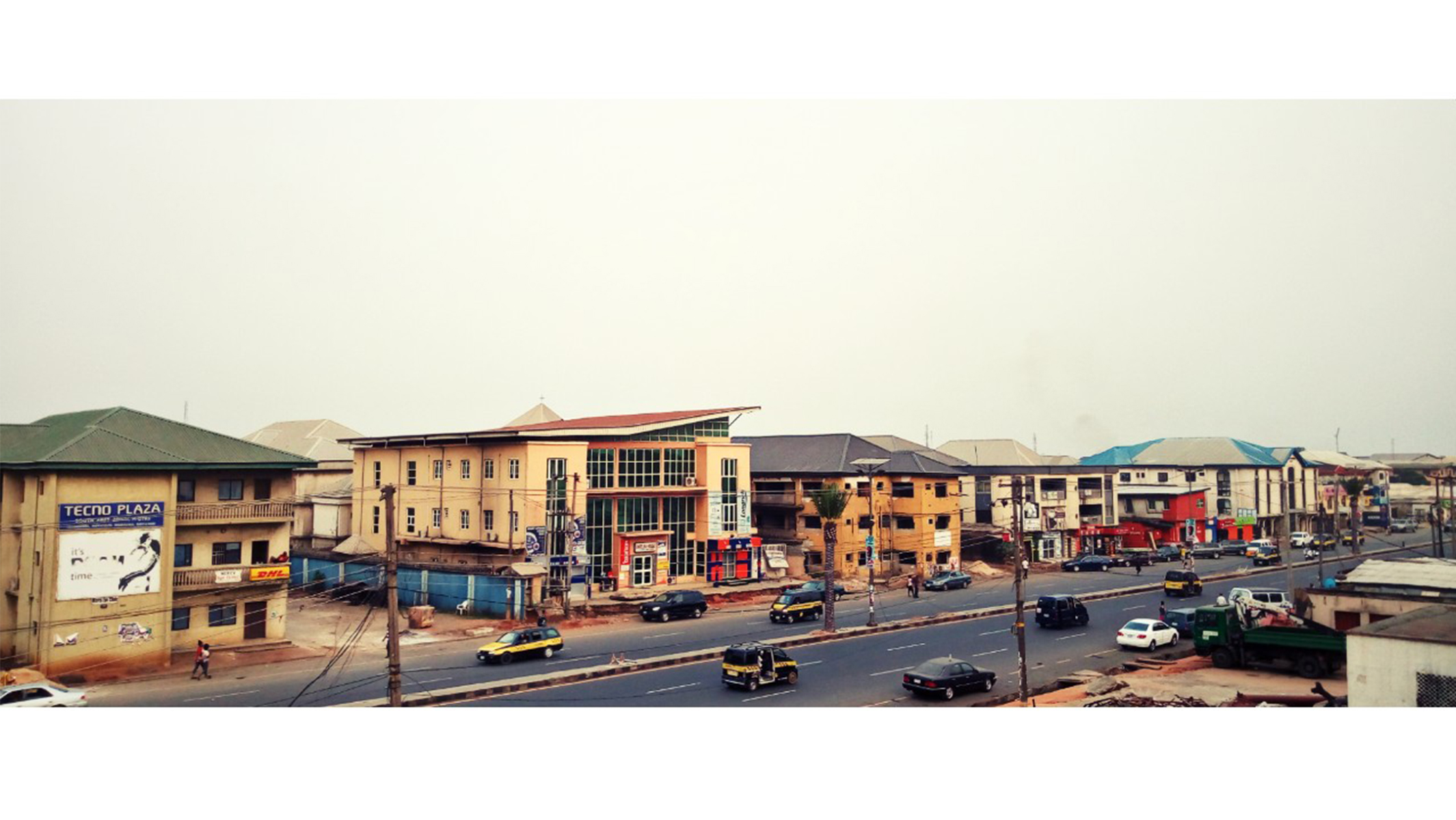
- A road in Owerri
- Nickname: Ala Owerre
- Motto: Eastern Heartland
- Owerri in Nigeria
- Coordinates: 5.485°N 7.035°E
- Country: Nigeria
- State: Imo
- LGA: Owerri Municipal, Owerri North, Owerri West. Owerri capital territory consist of 4 local governments; Owerri Municipal, Owerri North, Owerri West and Part of Mbaitoli

Government
  - Type: Executive Chairman-Council
  - Governing body: Local Government Council
  - Party: APC
  - Chairman: Emma Odor (Owerri Municipal); Henry Njoku (Owerri North); Henry Onwukwe (Apiti) (Owerri West)

Area
  - Total: 551 km^{2} (213 sq mi)

Population (2016)
  - Total: 1,401,873
  - Density: 2,540/km^{2} (6,590/sq mi)
- Disputed estimate

GDP (PPP, 2015 int. Dollar)
  - Year: 2023
  - Total: $12.6 billion
  - Per capita: $12,800
- Time zone: UTC+1 (WAT)
- Postcode: 460
- Area code: 083
- Climate: Am
- National language: Igbo
- Website: imostate.gov.ng

Owerri (/oʊˈwɛri/ oh-WERR-ee, Igbo: Owèrrè) is the capital city of Imo State in Nigeria, set in the heart of Igboland. It is also the state's largest city, followed by Orlu, Okigwe and Ohaji/Egbema. Owerri consists of three Local Government Areas namely Owerri Municipal, Owerri North and Owerri West. It has an estimated population of 1,401,873 as of 2016 and is approximately 551.00 square kilometres (212.743 sq mi) in area combining the 3 local government making up Owerri. Owerri is bordered by the Otamiri River to the east and the Nworie River to the south. The Owerri Slogan is Heartland. It is also called the Las Vegas of Africa, due to the night life of the city and the numerous hotels, casino and leisure parks all over the city.

== History ==
Owerri was founded by in the 14 century CE by Ekwem Oha.

Before becoming the capital of present-day Imo State, Owerri was the last of three capitals of the disputed Republic of Biafra in 1969. The capital of the secessionist state was continuously being moved as Nigerian troops captured the older capitals. Enugu and Umuahia were the other capitals before Owerri. Present-day Owerri does contain some statuary memorializing the war, particularly in locations which suffered heavy bombing, but most war artifacts and history are maintained in a museum at Umuahia, Abia State.

== Transport and trade ==
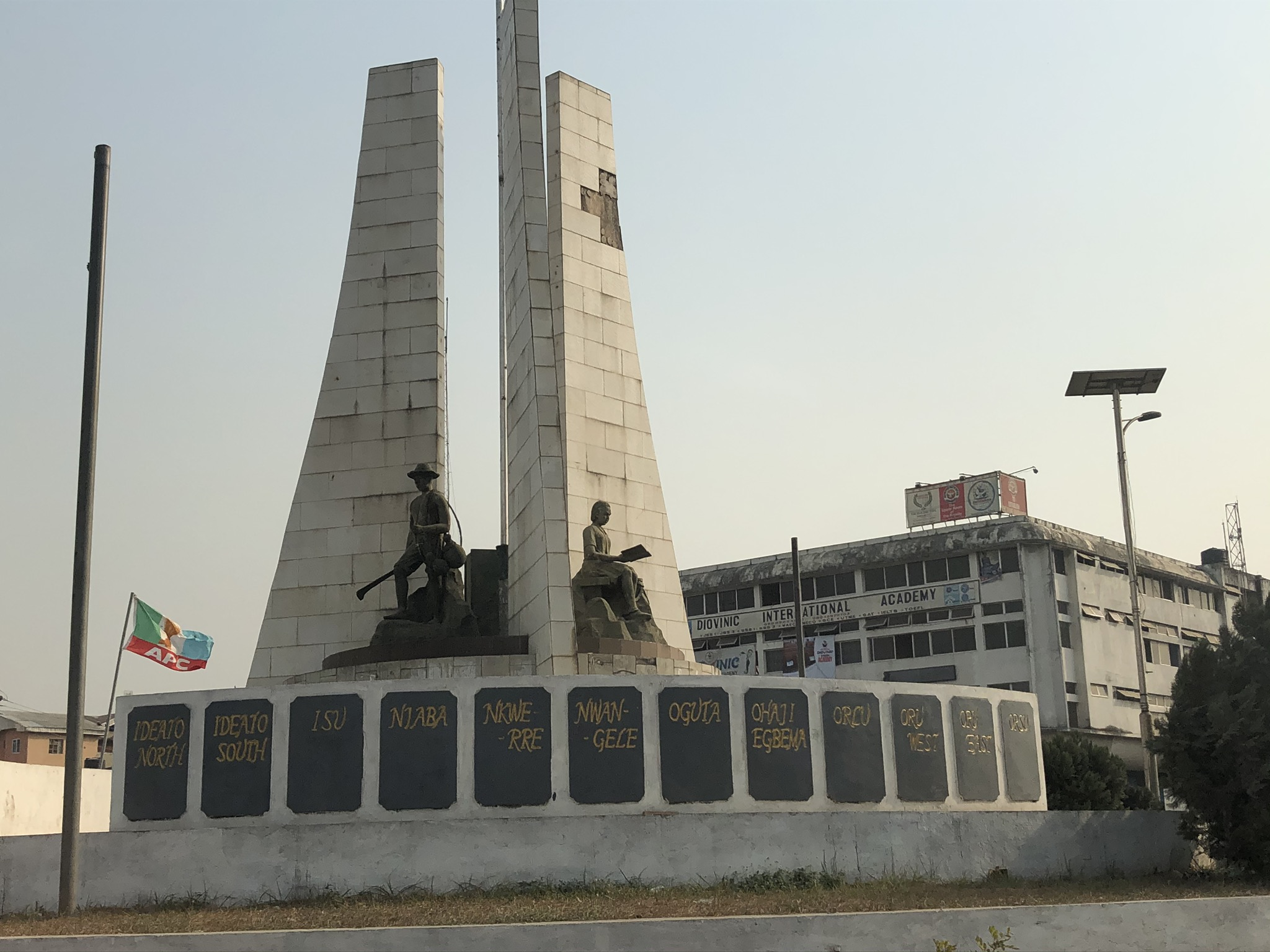
A roundabout in Owerri

Owerri has an airport 23 kilometres (14 mi) southeast of the city, called the Imo Airport, located in Obiangwu, Ngor Okpala LGA. The Airport (Sam Mbakwe Airport) provides flight services to Abuja, Lagos, Port Harcourt, and Enugu. The airport serves as an alternate for the Port Harcourt International Airport. As of 2025, the airport mostly serves as a cargo airport.

Some major roads that go through the city are Port Harcourt Road, Aba Road, Onitsha Road and Okigwe Road. Roads within the city include Douglas Road, Weatheral Road, Tetlow Road, and Works Road. Relief market is the main market in Owerri after the demolition of Eke Ukwu Owere.

Owerri sits in the rain forest and produces many agricultural products, such as yams, cassava, taro, corn, rubber and palm products. Owerri also sits on huge crude oil and natural gas reserves like most of the Igbo land areas.

== Climate ==
Owerri has a tropical wet climate according to the Köppen-Geiger system. Rain falls for most months of the year with a brief dry season. The Harmattan affects the city in the early periods of the dry season and it is noticeably less pronounced than in other cities in Nigeria. The average temperature is 26.4 °C.

Climate data for Owerri (1991–2020)
Month	Jan	Feb	Mar	Apr	May	Jun	Jul	Aug	Sep	Oct	Nov	Dec	Year
Record high °C (°F)	37.9 (100.2)	40 (104)	39 (102)	38.5 (101.3)	36 (97)	35 (95)	33.6 (92.5)	34 (93)	34 (93)	37 (99)	37 (99)	37 (99)	40.0 (104.0)
Mean daily maximum °C (°F)	33.8 (92.8)	34.9 (94.8)	34.2 (93.6)	33.3 (91.9)	32.3 (90.1)	30.8 (87.4)	29.4 (84.9)	29.2 (84.6)	30.1 (86.2)	31.2 (88.2)	32.8 (91.0)	33.7 (92.7)	32.1 (89.8)
Daily mean °C (°F)	27.9 (82.2)	29.2 (84.6)	29.1 (84.4)	28.6 (83.5)	27.8 (82.0)	26.9 (80.4)	26.1 (79.0)	26.0 (78.8)	26.5 (79.7)	27.1 (80.8)	28.2 (82.8)	27.9 (82.2)	27.6 (81.7)
Mean daily minimum °C (°F)	21.9 (71.4)	23.6 (74.5)	24.1 (75.4)	23.9 (75.0)	23.4 (74.1)	23.1 (73.6)	22.8 (73.0)	22.7 (72.9)	22.8 (73.0)	23.0 (73.4)	23.5 (74.3)	22.1 (71.8)	23.1 (73.6)
Record low °C (°F)	5 (41)	13 (55)	15.6 (60.1)	19.6 (67.3)	19 (66)	17.2 (63.0)	17 (63)	15 (59)	17.4 (63.3)	19.5 (67.1)	17 (63)	10.5 (50.9)	5.0 (41.0)
Average precipitation mm (inches)	18.2 (0.72)	44.0 (1.73)	98.7 (3.89)	171.3 (6.74)	273.2 (10.76)	314.1 (12.37)	361.5 (14.23)	341.1 (13.43)	380.7 (14.99)	256.4 (10.09)	58.5 (2.30)	10.4 (0.41)	2,328.2 (91.66)
Average precipitation days (≥ 1.0 mm)	1.2	2.7	6.0	9.7	14.1	15.5	20.1	19.8	20.0	16.0	4.5	0.7	130.3
Average relative humidity (%)	75.1	79.2	85.6	87.7	88.9	90.2	90.4	89.9	90.8	90.2	86.4	78.0	86.0
Source: NOAA

== Education ==
=== Universities/tertiary institutions ===
- African University of Science and Technology (AIST CCE Owerri)
- Federal Polytechnic, Nekede
- Federal University of Technology Owerri
- Imo State University
- Alvan Ikoku Federal University of Education

=== Secondary/high schools ===
- Federal Government Girls' College, Owerri

== Food ==
One major food that is particular to the Owerri people is known as ofe owerri (ofe means soup, while Owerri is the capital of Imo state). It is sometimes referred to as the king of soup and in some Igbo communities, beautiful women are sometimes likened to Ofe Owerri. Ingredients for the soup, include snails, ponmo (cow skin), goat meat, okporoko (dried hake fish), dried fish, oporo (smoked prawns), grounded dried crayfish, wraps of ogili (fermented soya beans), fresh pepper, grounded dried pepper, grounded uziza seeds (Ashanti pepper), cocoyam, palm oil, sliced ugu leaves (pumpkin leaves), sliced oha leaves, sliced uziza leaves, stock cubes, achi powder and salt.

== Sports ==
Owerri has a major Nigerian football club: Heartland F.C. It was known previously as Iwuanyawu Nationale, but the team retained its nickname: The Naze Millionaires. Popular super Eagle players hails from Owerri, people like Emmanuel Emenike, Kelechi Iheanacho who played for major English clubs like Manchester City F.C. and Leicester City F.C., Former Inter Milan, Arsenal, Portsmouth F.C. striker and Nigeria national football team player Nwankwo Kanu was born and raised in Owerri. He attended Holy Ghost College, a renowned local secondary school in the Owerri town.

== Religion ==
Christianity is the dominant religion in Owerri. Catholics and Anglicans have the largest followings and Owerri is home to Assumpta Cathedral, the seat of the Roman Catholic Archdiocese of Owerri (Latin: Archidioecesis Overriensis) and the Seat of Wisdom Seminary. The archdiocese covers an area of 2,996 square kilometres. 670,986 of the 1.7 million people in the area are members of the Catholic Church. The Anglican cathedral church of the transfiguration of our lord (CATOL) is the Anglican Cathedral for the Anglican faithfuls in the Anglican Diocese Of Owerri. There are about 700,670 members of the Anglican Church in the Owerri metropolis. All Saints Cathedral, Egbu, Owerri is the first and Largest Anglican Church in Owerri and the home of first Igbo translated Bible.

== Notable people ==
- Emmanuel Amunike, professional football manager and former footballer who played as a winger.
- Obed Ariri, footballer and American football player
- Luchy Donalds, actress
- Kelechi Eke, Filmmaker and Founder of Village Arts & Film Festival (VILLAFFEST)
- Mercy Eke, season 4 Winner of Big Brother Naija
- Kelechi Iheanacho, football player
- Nwankwo Kanu, football player
- Tochukwu Nnadi, football player

== Gallery ==
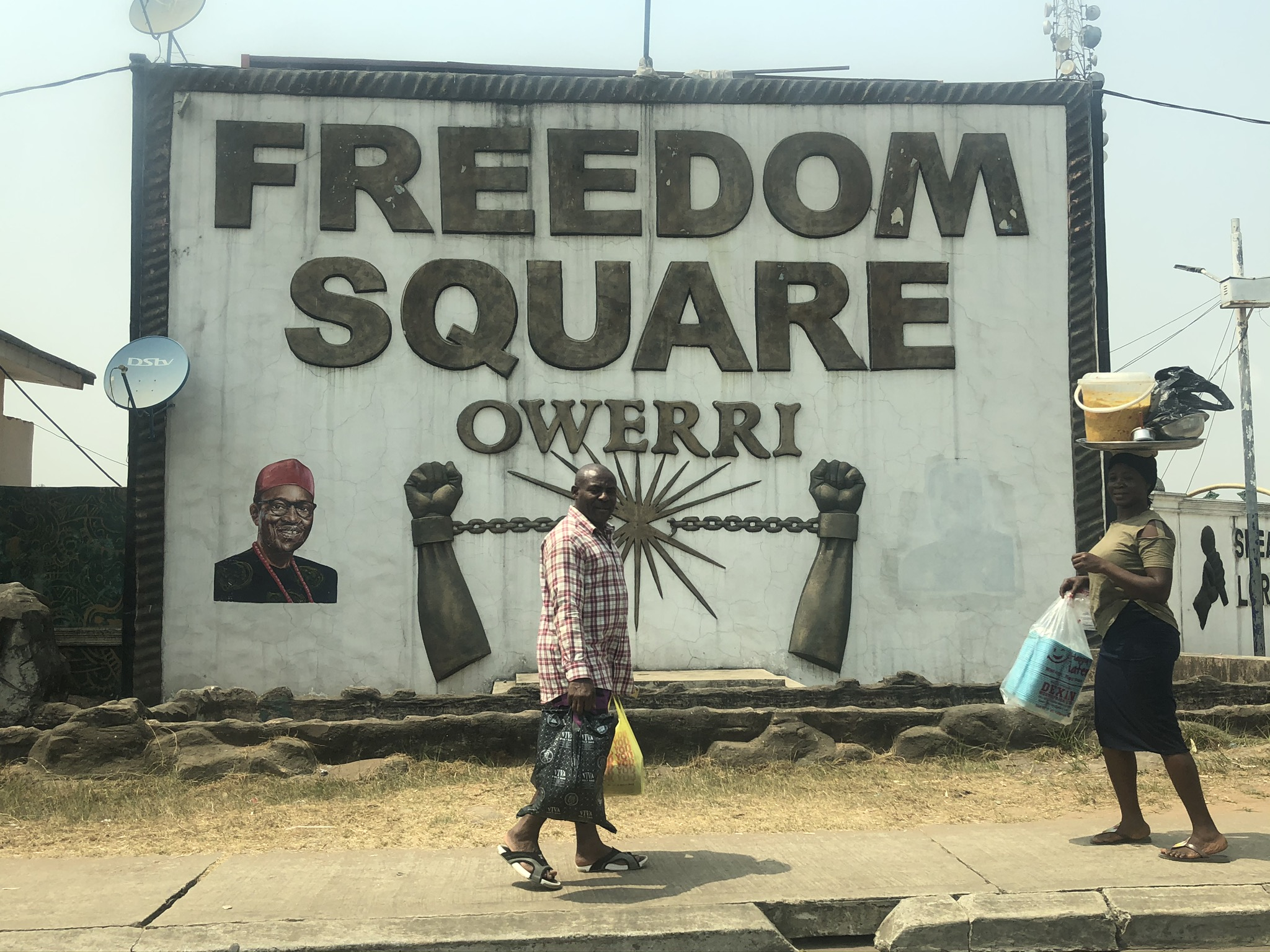
Freedom Square Owerri, Imo State

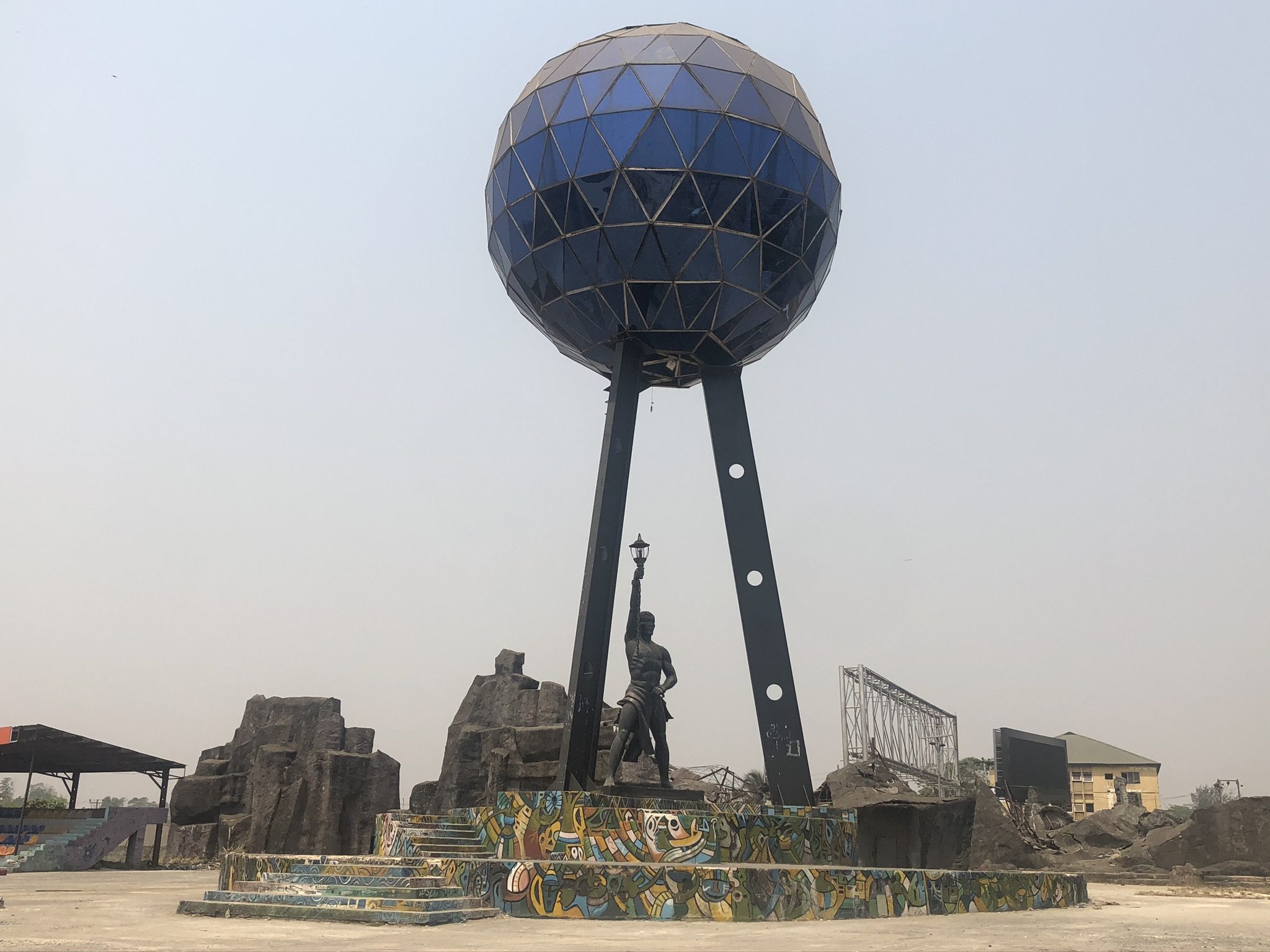
Freedom Square Owerri

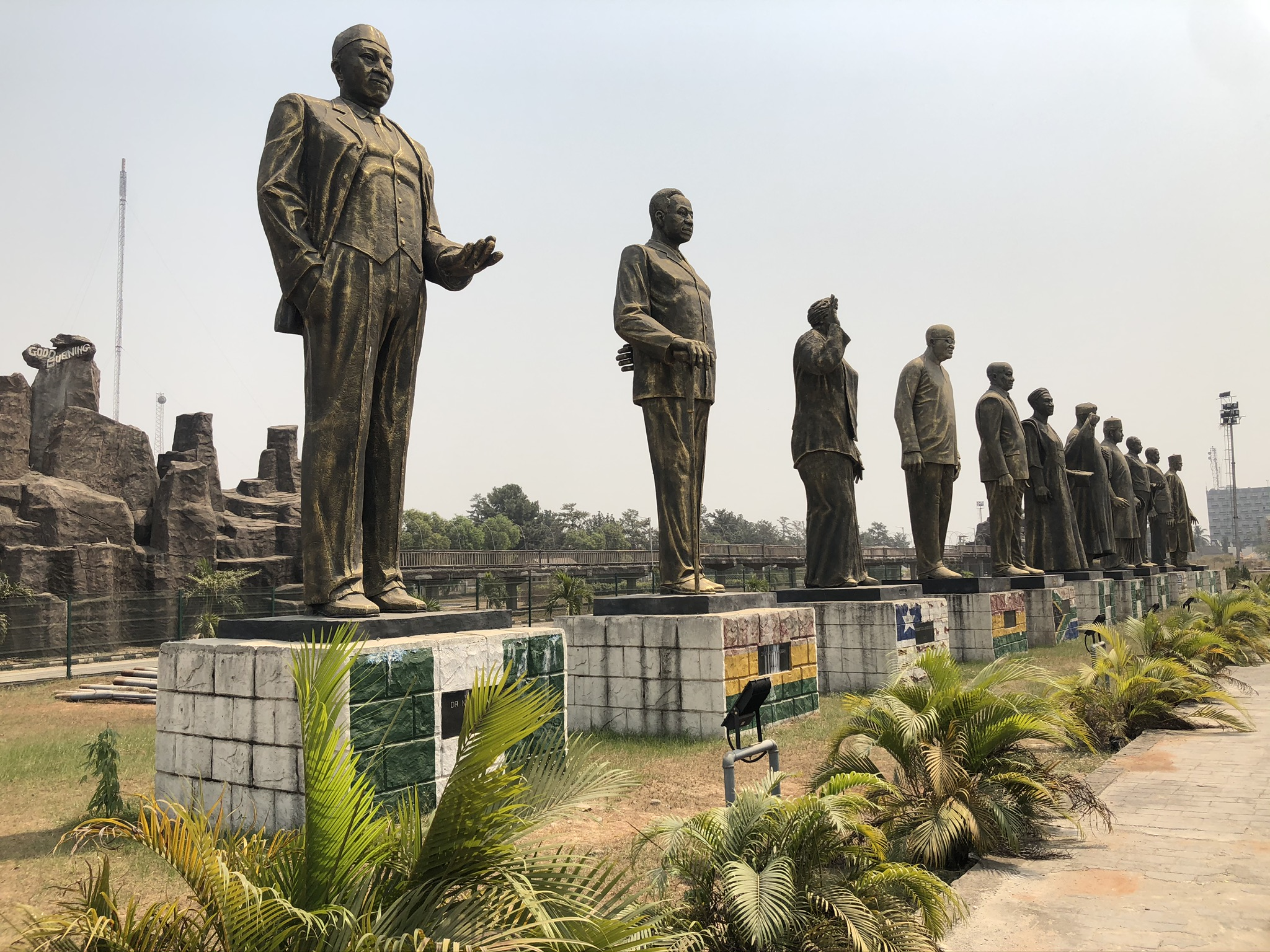
Statues in Heroes Square Owerri, Imo state

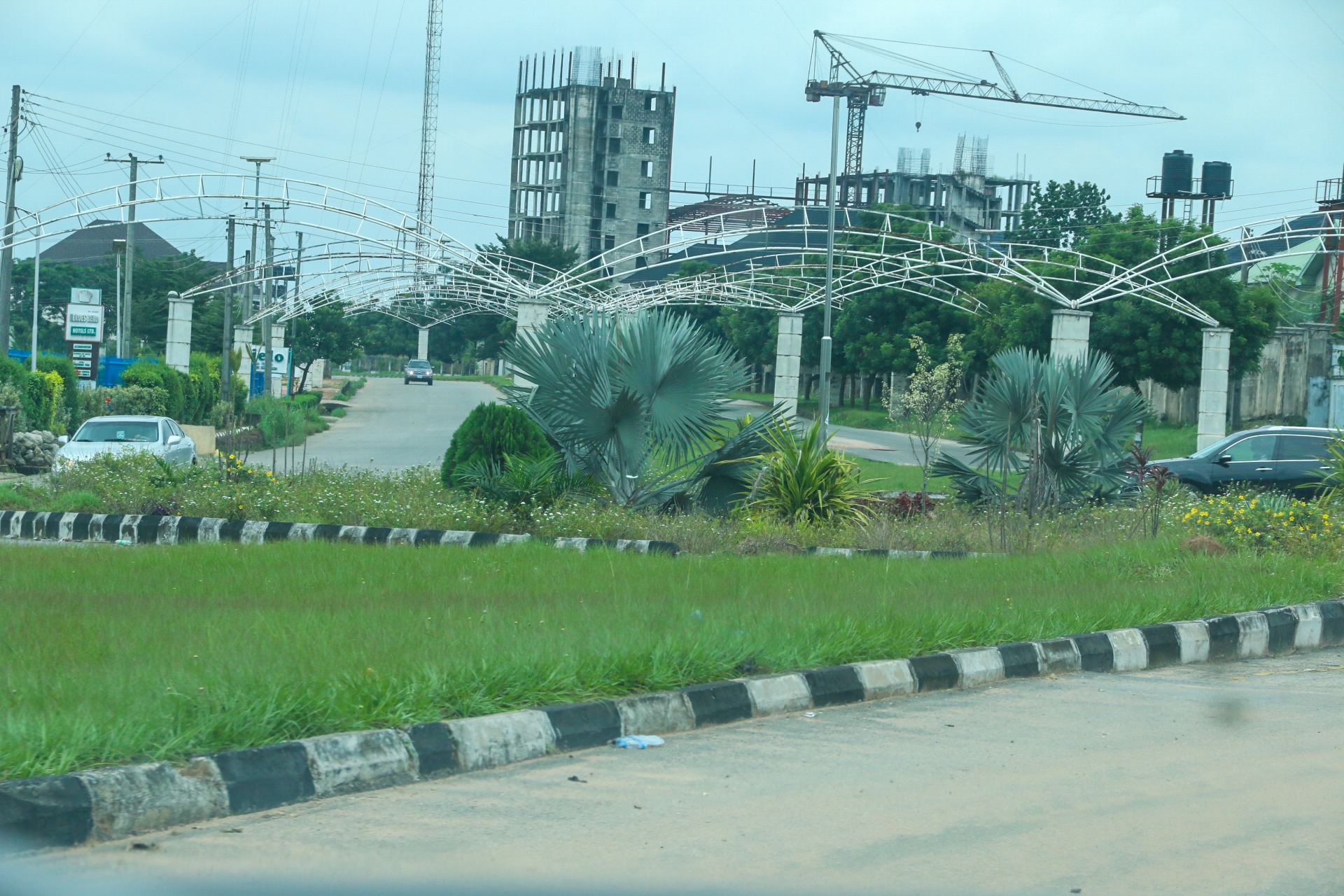
Freedom Park Owerri

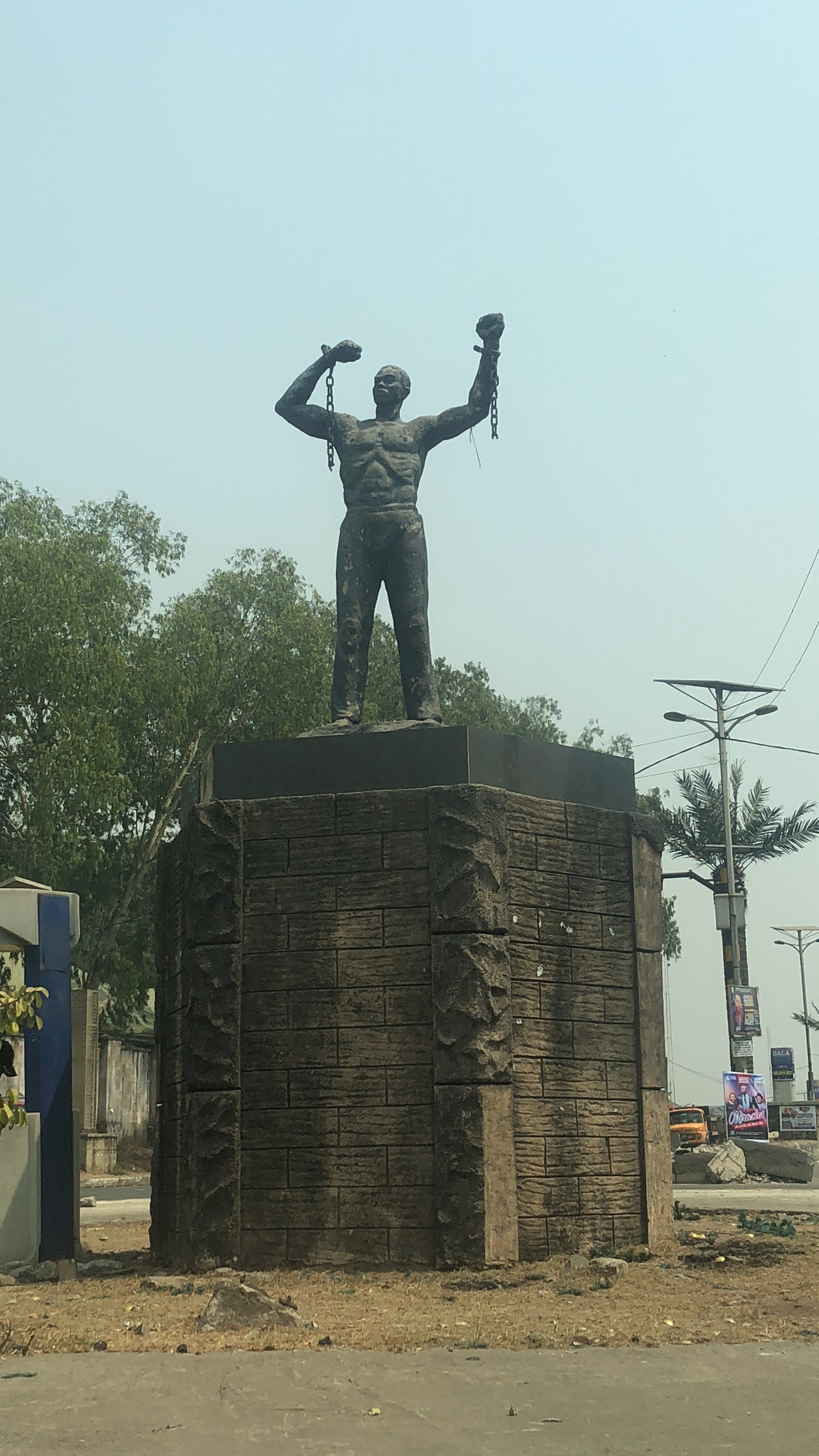
Statue of a freed slave

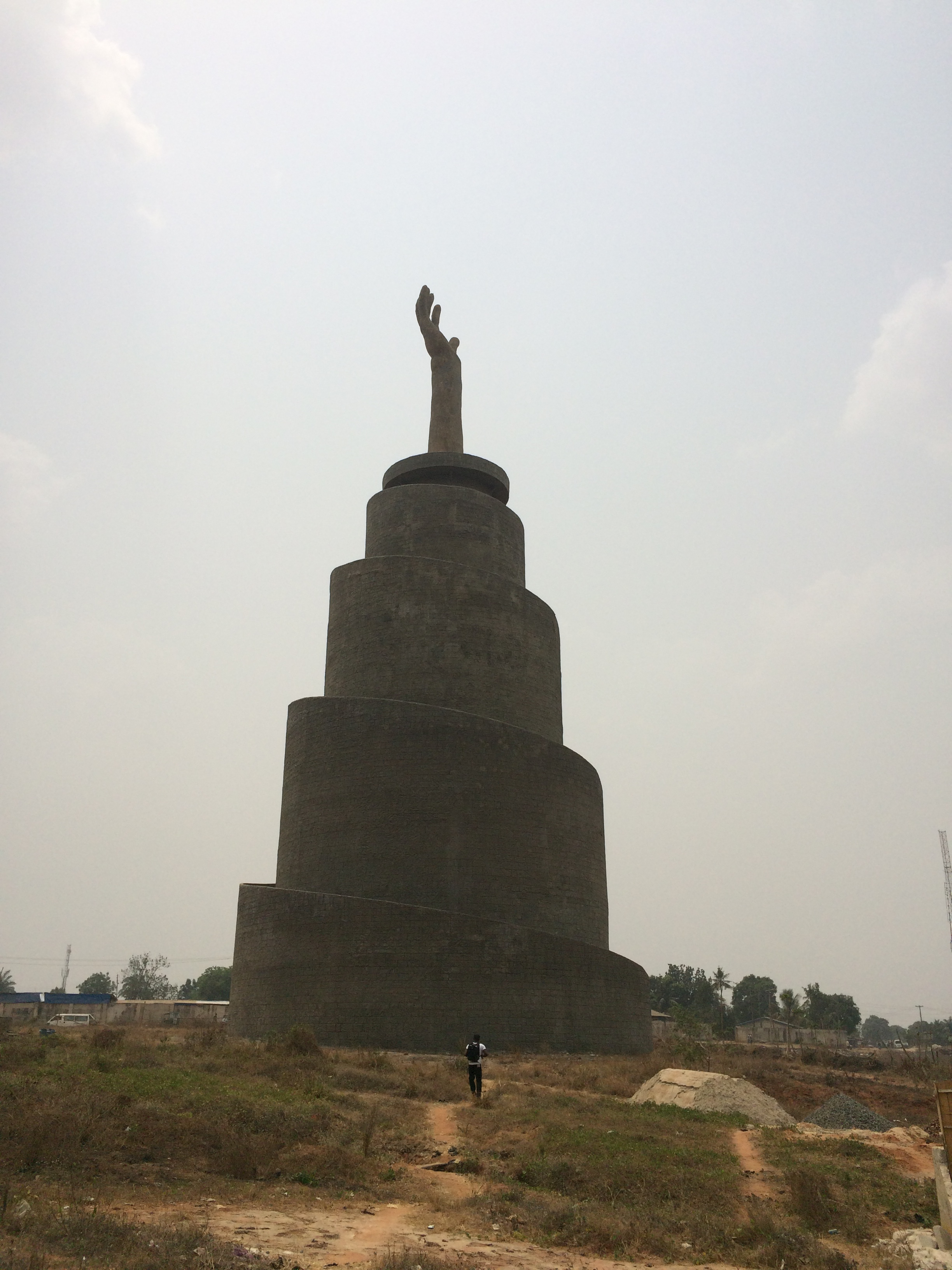
Akachi Monument, Owerri, Imo state

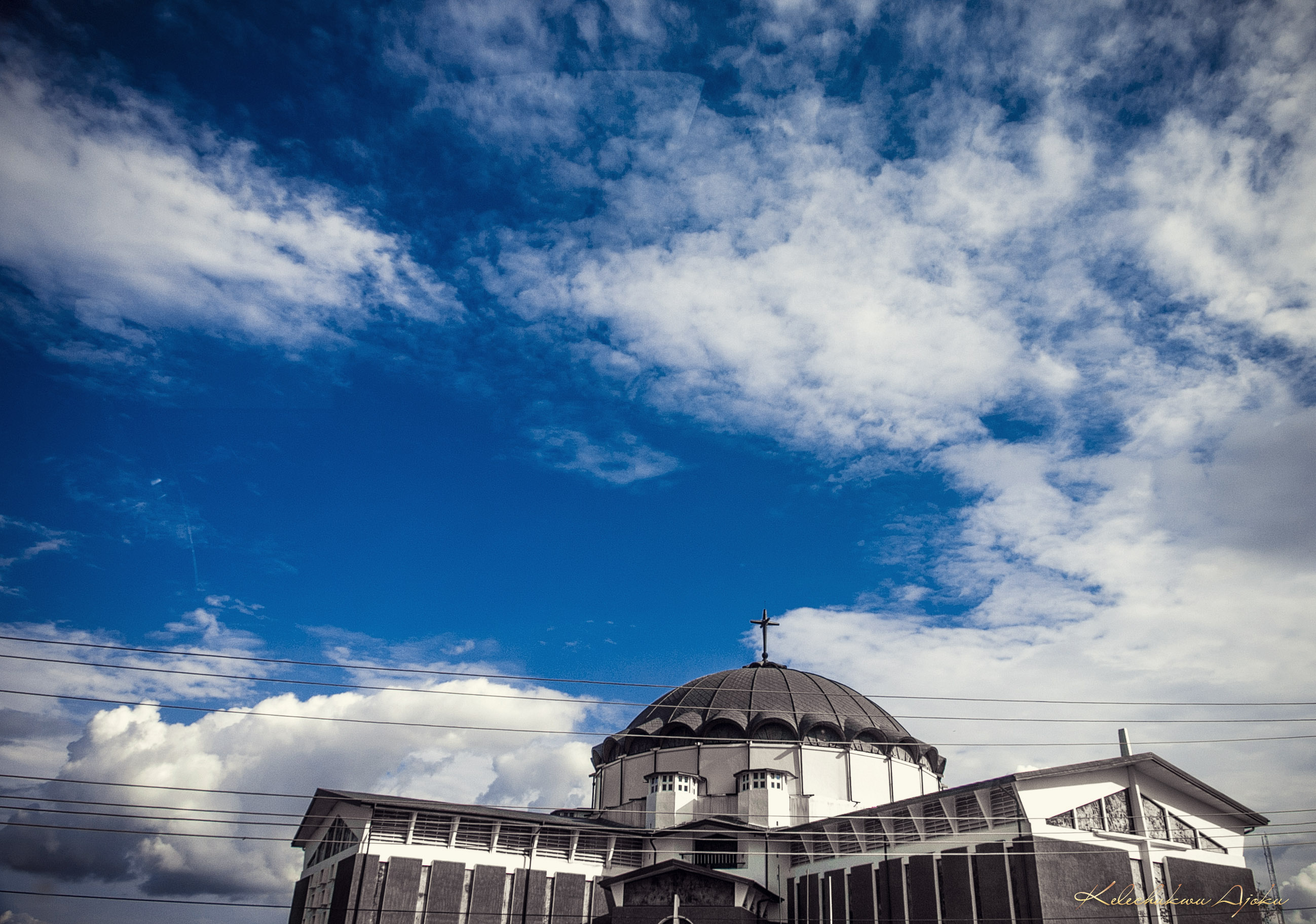
Assumpta Cathedral Owerri

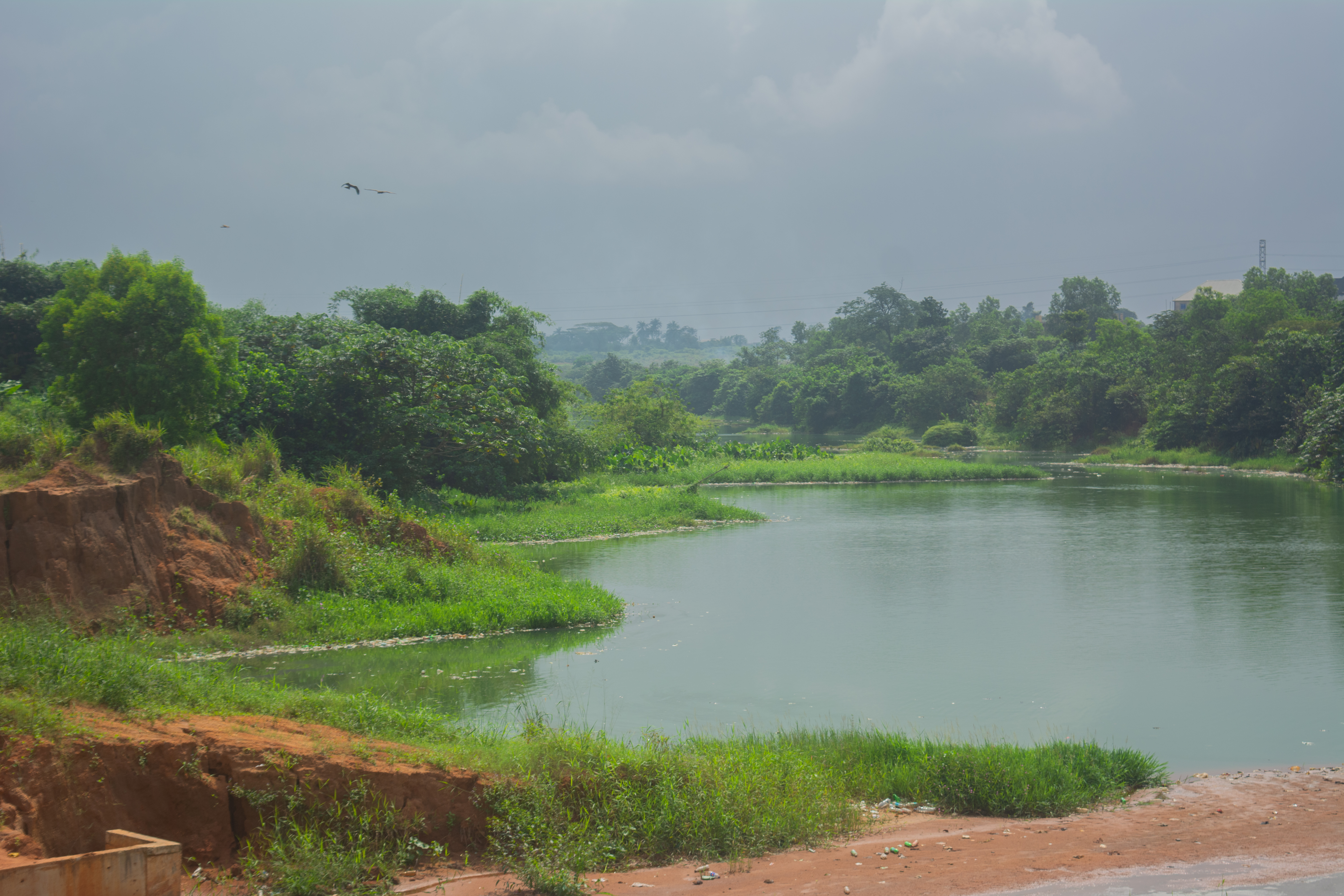
Otamiri River in Egbu, Owerri

== See also ==
- Ihitte Ogwa
