= Chigozie =

- Pronunciation: [t͡ʃígɔ́zjé]
- Gender: Masculine
- Language: Igbo

Origin
- Origin: Igboland
- Meaning: Chi bless (my efforts)

Other names
- Related names: Chiagozie(m), Chigozirim, Ngozi

Chigozie is a popular Igbo male name, derived from gọ̀zie, "to bless". It can be rendered in different ways: i.e., Chiagoziem and Chigozirim (both meaning "chi has blessed me"). It is also occasionally found as a surname.

== Given name ==
- Chigozie Agbim, Nigerian footballer
- Chigozie Anusiem (born 2000), American football player
- Chigozie Atuanya (born 1980), Nigerian actor
- Chigozie C. Asiabaka (born 1953), Nigerian academic
- Chigozie Christopher (born 1992), Nigerian footballer
- Chigozie Mbah (born 1997), Nigerian footballer
- Chigozie Obioma (born 1986), Nigerian writer
- Chigozie Ogbu, Nigerian academician
- Chigozie Udoji (born 1986), Nigerian footballer
- Chigozie Wisdom (born 1983), Nigerian singer
- Chigoziem Okonkwo (born 1999), American football player

== Surname ==
- Emmanuel Chigozie (born 1991), Nigerian footballer
