= Jennifer Okere =

Nigerian actress (born 1968)

- Born: 30 August 1968; Okolochi, Owerri West, Imo State, Nigeria
- Died: 28 June 1999 (aged 30)
- Education: University of Nigeria, Nsukka
- Occupation: Nollywood actress
- Years active: 1990—1999
- Spouse: Emeka Ossai

Jennifer Okere (30 August 1968 – 28 June 1999) was a Nigerian actress in the 1990s. Her two Nollywood movies, Living in Bondage and Glamour Girls have been re-adapted. She was the posthumous recipient of the 2016 Afro Heritage Broadcasting and Entertainment Awards (AHBEA) in Houston, Texas.

== Early life ==
Jennifer Okere was born to the family of Raymond Okere and Janet Okere in Okolochi, Owerri West, Imo State, Nigeria, where she lived through her teenage years. After completing her education, Okere moved to Lagos State with her family, where she entered the movie industry.

== Career ==
After studying theater art at the University of Nigeria, Nsukka, Okere joined Nollywood in the early nineties.

Okere's first movie role was in Living in Bondage, an Igbo movie starring Kenneth Okonkwo, Nnenna Nwabueze, Okechukwu Ogunjiofor, Francis Agu, and Bob-Manuel Udokwu.

Her second role was in Glamour Girls, starring Liz Benson, Ngozi Ezeonu, Eucharia Anuobi, Pat Attah, Ernest Obi, Zack Orji, and others.

Okere also featured in Ikuku and True Confession. She also acted in The Oath, The Ripples, Strange Woman, and Calabash. The Oath was Okere's final movie.

== Awards ==
In 1996, Okere received the Movie Award as the Best Igbo Actress after acting in Ikuku (part 2). After her death, she was awarded the Afro Heritage Broadcasting and Entertainment Awards (AHBEA) in 2016 in Houston, Texas. The award was received by her husband, Emeka Ossai, at the 2nd edition of the prestigious award. Being made popular by Living in Bondage and Glamour Girls brought about the recognition and celebration of her talents at the Afro Heritage Broadcasting and Entertainment Awards (AHBEA).
