= Glamour Girls =

Glamour Girls may refer to:

- Glamour Girls (1994 film), a Nigerian film
- Glamour Girls (2022 film), a Nigerian film

== See also ==
- The Glamour Girls, a female professional wrestling tag team
