= Ngozi =

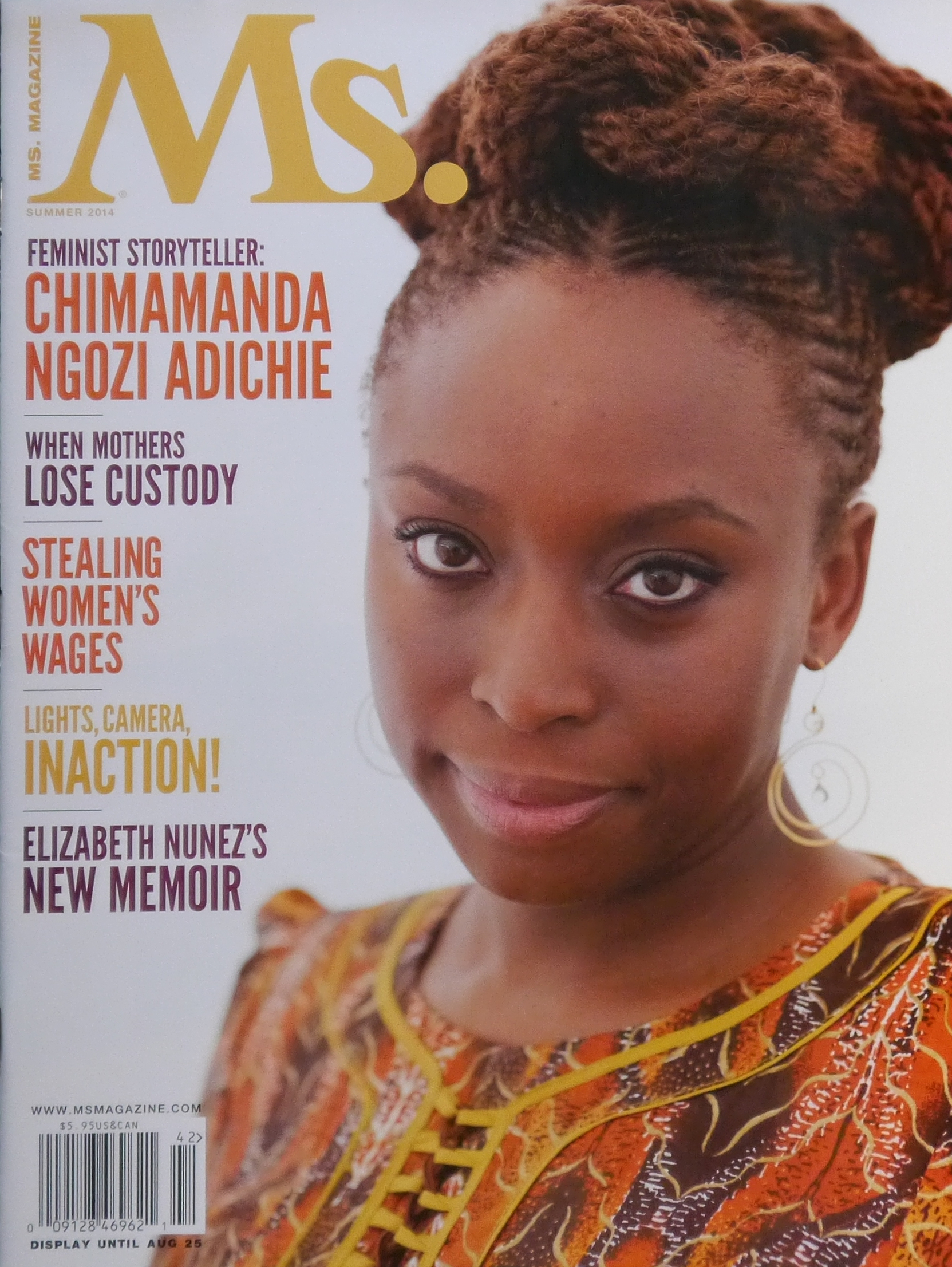
- Chimamanda Ngozi Adichie on the cover of Ms. in 2014
- Pronunciation: [ŋ́gɔ́zí]
- Gender: Female
- Language: Igbo

Origin
- Meaning: Blessing
- Region of origin: Igboland

Other names
- Related names: Chigozie

Ngozi is a popular feminine name of Igbo origin that means "blessing". It can be short for Ngozichukwu ("God’s blessing"), but standalone use is more common.

== Notable people with this name ==
- Chiedozie Ngozi Egesi, Nigerian plant scientist and professor
- Chimamanda Ngozi Adichie (born 15 September 1977), Nigerian writer and literary critic
- Ngozi Alaegbu, Nigerian journalist and TV presenter
- Ngozi Anyanwu. Nigerian playwright and actress
- Ngozi Chuma-Udeh, Nigerian teacher, orator, academic, novelist, poet, and activist for women and children
- Ngozi Ebere (born 5 August 1991), Nigerian footballer
- Ngozi Ezike, Nigerian internist and pediatrician
- Ngozi Ezeocha (born 12 October 1973), Nigerian former football player
- Ngozi Ezeonu, Nigerian actress
- Ngozi Monu (born 1981), Nigerian swimmer
- Ngozi Nwokocha, (born 28 September 1986), Nigerian sprinter
- Ngozi Nwosu (born 1 August 1963), Nigerian actress and producer
- Ngozi Odu (born 19 October 1952), Nigerian politician
- Ngozi Okobi-Okeoghene, Nigerian footballer
- Ngozi Okolie, Nigerian politician
- Ngozi Okonjo-Iweala (born 1954), finance minister of Nigeria
- Ngozi Olejeme, Nigerian philanthropist
- Ngozi Onwurah, British-Nigerian film director
- Ngozi Paul, Canadian stage and screen actress, writer, director and producer
- Ngozi Ukazu, American cartoonist and graphic novelist
- Virginia Ngozi Etiaba, Nigerian politician

== Places ==
These are independent of the Igbo meaning.

- Commune of Ngozi, Burundi
- Lake Ngozi, a crater lake in Tanzania
- Ngozi, Burundi, a city in Burundi
- Ngozi Province, Burundi
