= Viola Onwuliri =

Foreign minister of Nigeria

Prof. Viola Adaku Onwuliri
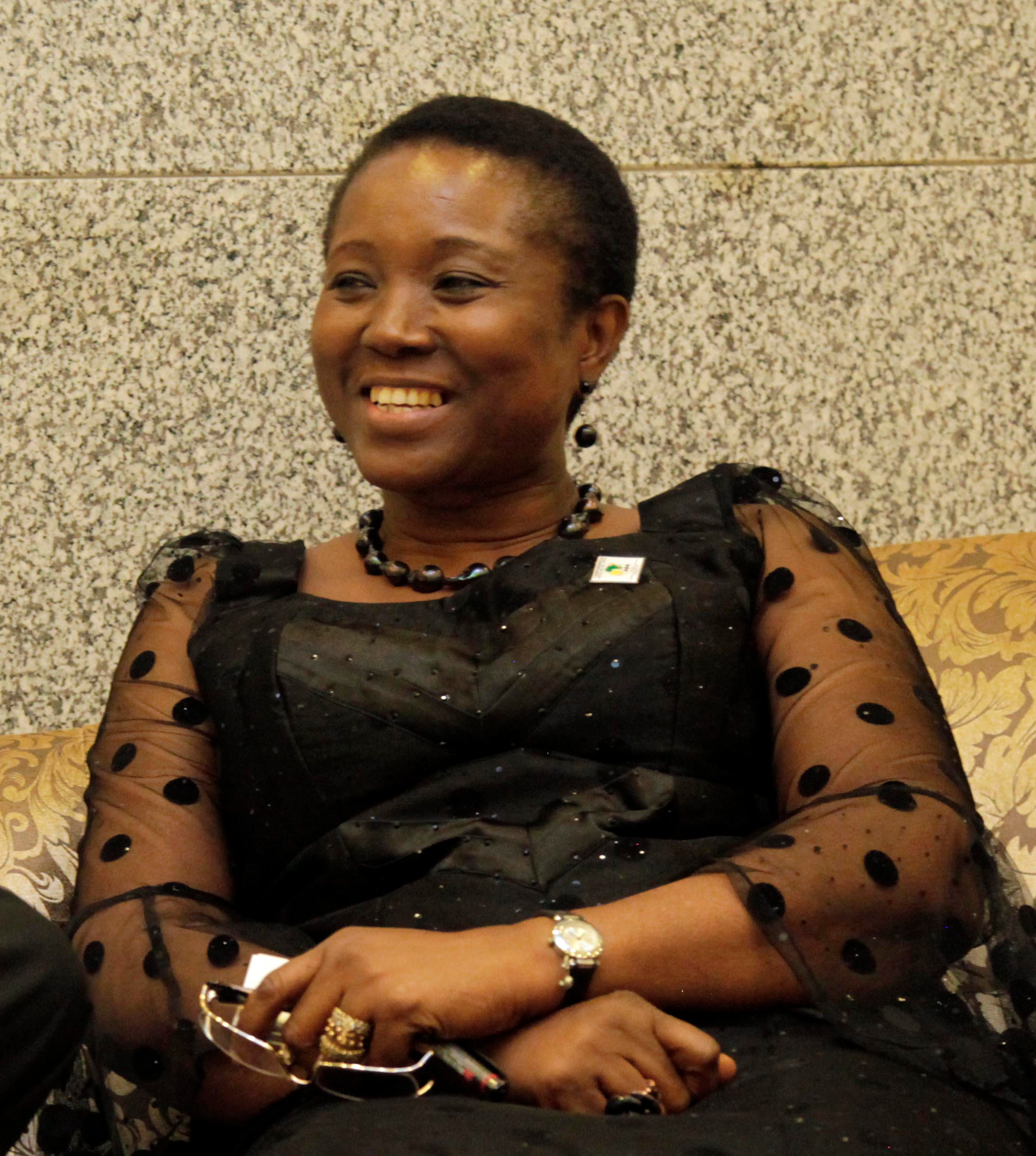

Pro-Chancellor, Nigerian Maritime University (NMU)
- In office 2015–Present

Minister of Education, State-1
- In office 2014–2015
- Preceded by: Ezenwo Nyesom Wike
- Succeeded by: A. Anwukah

Minister of Foreign Affairs
- In office 2013–2014
- Preceded by: Olugbenga Ashiru
- Succeeded by: Aminu Bashir Wali

Minister of Foreign Affairs, State-1
- In office 2011–2013

Personal details
- Born: 18 June 1956 (age 70) Mbaise
- Spouse: Prof. Celestine Elihe Onwuliri (m. 1978; died 2012)
- Children: 5 (Ije, Kenn, Emeka, Dan, Toch)
- Education: University of Nigeria, Nsukka; University of Jos; Howard University; Harvard University

Viola Adaku Onwuliri // (born 18 June 1956) is a university professor of Biochemistry and politician who served as Nigeria's Foreign Minister.

== Early life and education ==
Viola Onwuliri is the first daughter of the Royal Family of His Highness Eze Cletus and Ugoeze Dorathy Oparaoji of Amuzi, Ahiazu Mbaise LGA, Imo State, Nigeria She was born in Lagos in 1956. She attended Owerri Girls' Secondary School before proceeding to the University of Nigeria, Nsukka where she achieved a 2nd Class Upper (2:1) in Biochemistry. She later attended the University of Jos where she earned a Postgraduate Certificate in Education (PGCE), an MSc in Applied Organic Chemistry, and a PhD in Molecular Biochemistry. Additionally, she completed certificate courses at Howard University and Harvard School of Public Health in the USA.

== Career ==
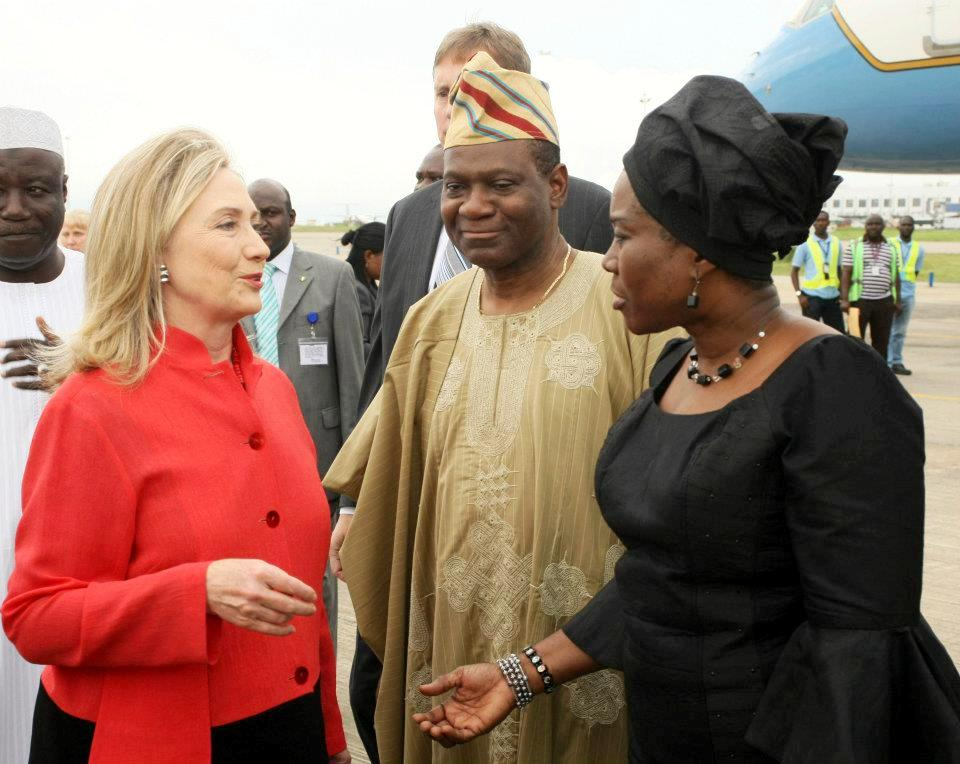
Hillary Clinton welcomed by Foreign ministers Olugbenga Ashiru and Viola Onwuliri in 2012

Viola returned to Nigeria where she took a job as a graduate assistant in 1981; in 2004 she became professor of Biochemistry 2004 at the University of Jos. During the period she and her husband, Celestine Onwuliri, had five children.

In 2004 Onwuliri became the first Nigerian and first African female to be elected member of the Geneva based International AIDS Society (IAS) and became its African regional representative from 2004 till 2008 and was reelected in 2008 for another four years.

In 2011 she was a candidate to be a deputy governor of Imo state and ran with Gov. Ikedi Ohakim, after they lost the election she was offered a Cabinet position as Commissioner by the opposing party Governor Rochas Okorocha but she turned it down to the surprise of many.

She later became a Federal Minister with her own party and made the news when on 17 October 2013 she led the Nigeria delegation to win the seat of the United Nations Security Council (UNSC) in a Global election just two years after leaving the council; this had not been expected to be achieved until much later in around 10 years time.

She was also in the spotlight when she called for Libya's ruler, Moammar Gadhafi, to resign stating that the Libyan rebel council best represented the Libyan people. The same month as Foreign Minister, she visited the scene of the Abuja United Nations bombing which killed over 20 people. She was quoted saying: "This is not an attack on Nigeria but on the global community. An attack on the world."

Disaster struck with the Dana Air Flight 992 plane crash in June 2012 that killed her husband Celestine Onwuliri and over 150 others. He had been the Vice-Chancellor of the Federal University of Technology Owerri (FUTO).

As the wife of the Vice Chancellor of FUTO and the Founder and President of the FUTO Women's Association (FUTOWA) (2006-2011), she played a critical role in job creation, the development of FUTO through FUTOWA including the creation of childcare facilities for staff and students, the establishment of the child development centre and the elevation of the status of women in FUTO.

She caused a stir in late 2013 as Foreign Minister when she requested that the Imo Governor at the time give an expenditure account of monies in form of allocations from the Federal Government he received on behalf of Imo State, including Sure-P Fund, Erosion control, Flood money, LGA Allocations, NDDC allocations and other Sundry monies As Foreign Affairs Minister she worked to re-establish and improve relationships with Nigerians in the Diaspora, as a first step towards creating an environment to attract Diaspora Nigerians' participation in accomplishing the Agenda of the President and to attract increased Foreign Direct Investment and Foreign Direct Remittances which rose to 8billion dollars and 21 billion dollars respectively during her tenure, working to promote respect of and improve the treatment of Nigerians in the diaspora; and she became the first seating Nigerian Minister to be officially hosted at the esteemed historically Black University, Howard University. As Nigeria's Minister of Foreign Affairs she served from 11 July 2011- 22 October 2014, which included serving as the State-1 Minister and then the Supervising Minister of the Ministry of Foreign Affairs between 2013 and 2014 before being moved to the Education Ministry as its State-1 Minister.

In 2013, she won the chairmanship of the GlobalPOWER Women Network Africa. Later that year, she received the European Union Honorary Platinum Leadership Award in Politics on 28 November 2013 in Stockholm, Sweden.

Onwuliri was the Chairperson of the African continental women's society SWAAN and worked as Principal Investigator and Project Director in partnership with the Bill and Melinda Gates Foundation. President Goodluck Jonathan moved Onwuliri from the Foreign Office to be the Minister of State for Education in October 2014 when Ezenwo Nyesom Wike resigned.

In 2015, the Nigerian government appointed Onwuliri as the Pro-Chancellor of the Nigerian Maritime University (NMU) and as its Chairman of council.

== See also ==
- Minister of Foreign Affairs (Nigeria)
