= Jude Njoku =

Nigerian academic

- Born: Jude Nzochukwu Njoku; Owerri, Imo State
- Occupation: Academic • writer
- Years active: 1977–present

4th Vice-Chancellor Federal University of Technology Owerri
- In office 2000–2005
- Preceded by: Prof. C. O. G. Oba
- Succeeded by: Prof. C.E.O. Onwuliri

Jude Nzochukwu Njoku better known as Jude Njoku is a Nigerian professor of Agricultural economics. He served as the 4th Vice-Chancellor of Federal University of Technology Owerri from 2000 to 2005.
