= Nnenna Oti =

Nigerian academic

Vice-Chancellor of Federal University of Technology Owerri
- Assuming office 19 June 2021
- Succeeding: Francis Chukwuemeka Eze

Personal details
- Born: Nnenna Nnannaya Oti; 15 November 1958 (age 67) Afikpo North, Ebonyi State, Nigeria

Nnenna Nnannaya Oti (born 15 November 1958) is a Nigerian professor and the first female substantive Vice-Chancellor of Federal University of Technology Owerri. Oti defeated Ikechukwu Dozie on 13 April 2021 and has resumed office as the 8th Vice-Chancellor of the institution on 19 June 2021.

== Early life and education ==
Nnenna Oti is from and was born in Afikpo North, Ebonyi State, Nigeria. She received a B. Agric. in soil science from University of Nigeria, finishing in first class. She furthered and received a master's degree in social science with focus on soil biology and biochemistry from the same University of Nigeria. She continued her studies at Catholic University, Leuven where she received a postgraduate diploma in irrigation engineering, earning a distinction. She received a doctorate degree in soil and environmental conservation from Federal University of Technology Owerri.

== Career ==
Oti is a three-time head of department of soil science and technology in the school of agricultural and agriculture technology at Federal University of Technology Owerri. She is a past chairman of Gender Policy Unit and the immediate past dean of post-graduate school in her second tenure. She is a professor of soil science and environmental conservation. She has served as a consultant to various government agencies including TETFund and Anambra Imo River Basin Development Authority.

== Vice-Chancellor of FUTO ==
On 13 April 2021, Oti was elected as the Vice-Chancellor of Federal University of Technology Owerri and replaced Francis Chukwuemeka Eze when his tenure expired on 19 June 2021. She defeated six other candidates and scored 75.5 percent to beat her closest rival, Ikechukwu Dozie who scored 69.7 percent. She is now the first female Vice-Chancellor of the institution and an immediate past deputy Vice-Chancellor, Academic.

In 2021, her administration faced criticism for appointing the Minister of Communication and Digital Economy, Isa Ali Pantami a Professor without following due process. The Alumni Association of Federal University of Technology Owerri (FUTO) called the award a deception and called on the University management to reconsider the appointment. The Academic Staff Union of Universities (ASUU) also described the promotion of Ali Isa Pantami, to a professor as “illegal” and promised to sanction Oti.

== Abia Election ==
Oti was the returning officer in the Abia state governorship election and was hailed for the key role she played in ensuring that the election outcome was not compromised, despite attempts and pressure from political actors of the ruling PDP in the state to bribe her.

== Personal life ==
Oti is married to Nnannaya Oti and they have three children.
