= Ifeanyi Orajaka =

Nigerian engineer and entrepreneur (born 1988)

- Born: Ifeanyi Benedict-Jerome Orajaka; 14 April 1988 (age 38); Anambra State, Nigeria
- Occupations: Engineer, entrepreneur

Ifeanyi Orajaka (born 14 April 1988) is a Nigerian engineer and entrepreneur. He is the co-founder and chief executive officer of Green Village Electricity (GVE) Projects Limited, a renewable energy business in Sub-Saharan Africa.

== Early life and education ==
Orajaka was born in Eastern Nigeria to Christian parents. After his primary and secondary education, he went to the Federal University of Technology, Owerri (FUTO) where he obtained a Bachelor of Engineering degree in electrical and electronics engineering. He then went on to the University of Port-Harcourt where he acquired a master's degree in electrical power systems engineering.

Orajaka is an alumnus of the Harvard Business School's Driving Profitable Growth and Senior Executives Program. He is also a member of the inaugural cohort of the Obama Foundation Leadership Program (Africa).

He is a member of the World Economic Forum's Global Shapers Community as well as the AU-EU High level Platform on Sustainable Energy Investment in Sub-Saharan Africa. He is also a member of the Institute of Electrical and Electronics Engineers (IEEE).

== Career ==
Orajaka co-founded Green Village Electricity (GVE) Projects Limited. GVE is a renewable energy provider, serving both rural and urban households. Through GVE, he has made collaborations with organisations such as Deloitte, United States Agency for International Development, Department for International Development, US Power Africa Initiative, GIZ, IEEE, General Electric and United States Africa Development Foundation.

He is a member of the advisory board of the Renewable Energy Association of Nigeria and a member of the finance working group of the African Mini-grids Developers Association.

== Awards and honors ==
- The Future Awards Africa Prize in Business (2016)
