= Dolly Unachukwu =

Nigerian actress (born 1969)

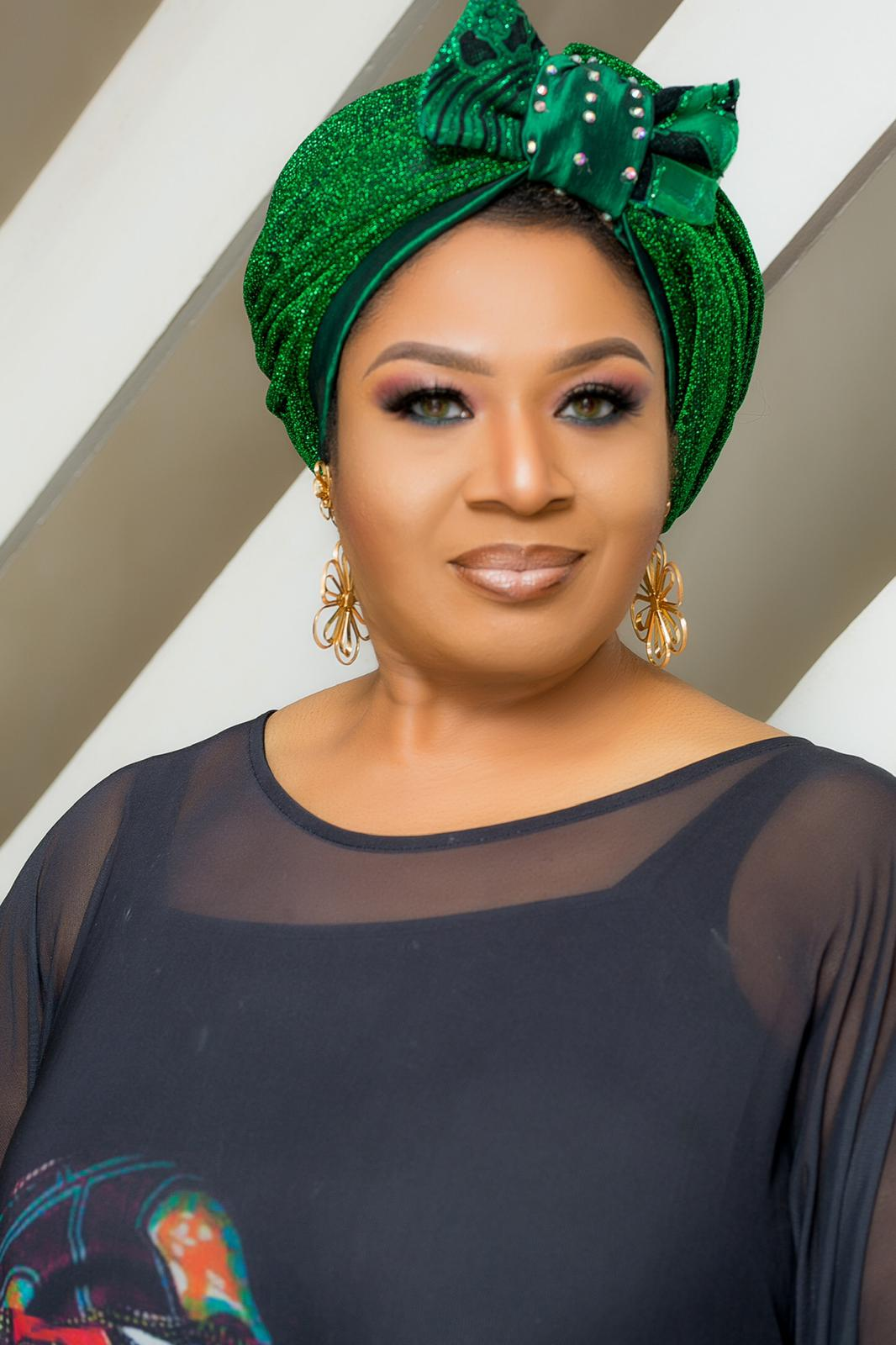
- Dolly Unachukwu in 2020
- Born: Dolly Nchedo Nkem Unachukwu; 1 November 1969 (age 56); Lagos, Nigeria
- Citizenship: British
- Education: Lagos State University University of East London
- Occupations: Actress, writer, producer, film director
- Years active: 1986 – present
- Notable work: Deadly Affair Father Moses
- Spouses: Emmanuel Nwokenkwo (m. 1992; div. 1994), 1 child; Jonathan Ezea (m. 2000; ann. 2000) Dr. Olaniyan (m. 2011; div. 2015)
- Children: 2, Ody Nwokenkwo (Billions CFL), Hazel Okoro

Dolly Unachukwu // (born 1 November 1969) is a Nigerian actress, producer, writer, and director. She came to national prominence as Fadake Akin-Thomas in the TV series Fortunes.

== Life and career ==
Born in 1969 to a family of seven, Unachukwu started her acting career at the age of 16. A native of Amichi in Anambra State, she first appeared in a junior television drama in 1985 as a secretary. Later that year she was cast in the prime-time soap opera Mirror in the Sun as Prisca. Unachukwu attended the Jos Television College in Jos, Plateau State, where she received a diploma in television production in 1988. She later went on to study phonetics in 1989 at the FRCN Training School in Lagos and then went to the Lagos State University in 1990 and earned a diploma in law.

She landed her breakthrough role in Fortunes in 1993 as Fadeke Akin-Thomas, the subdued wife of millionaire Fred Akin-Thomas. She starred in Deadly Affair and Deadly Affair II alongside Nollywood veterans Emeka Ike, Sandra Achums, and Jide Kosoko. Unachukwu played a mean pimp in the controversial film Glamour Girls, which became the most popular Nigerian film in the United States in 1995. She also appeared in the 2022 remake of Glamour Girls with Gloria Young.

In 1997, Unachukwu produced her life story, Wildest Dream. In the film, she narrated her first marriage, which ended in 1994, making her a single parent. Her estranged husband threatened to sue her over the use of his real name in the film. Unachukwu remarried in 2000 and in August of the same year moved to join her husband in England, splitting with him soon after her arrival. In England, Unachukwu began a three-year degree course in films and videos at the University of East London Docklands Campus in 2003, taking two years off for maternity leave in 2004. She graduated in June 2008. Unachukwu produced and directed her own film, The Empire, in 2005, while on break from the university.

== Filmography ==
Year	Title	Role
1986	Mirror in the Sun (TV)	
1993	Fortunes (TV)	
1994	Glamour Girls I	
1995	Deadly Affair	Isabella
1996	Deborah and the Dragon	
1996	Glamour Girls II	
1996	Tears for Love	
1997	Deadly Affair II	Isabella
1997	Deadly Passion	
1997	Irony	
1997	Wildest Dream	
1998	Love without Language	
1998	Brotherhood of Darkness	Regina
1999	Father Moses	
1998	Full Moon 1 & 2	Julie
2000	War of Roses	
2002	Good Night	Cynthia
2006	The Empire	Katherine Odogwu
2008	Sisters Love	Lizzy
2022	Private Matters	Mrs. Bimbo
2022	Dance with Me	Cordelia
