= Ikechukwu Dozie =

Nigerian academician

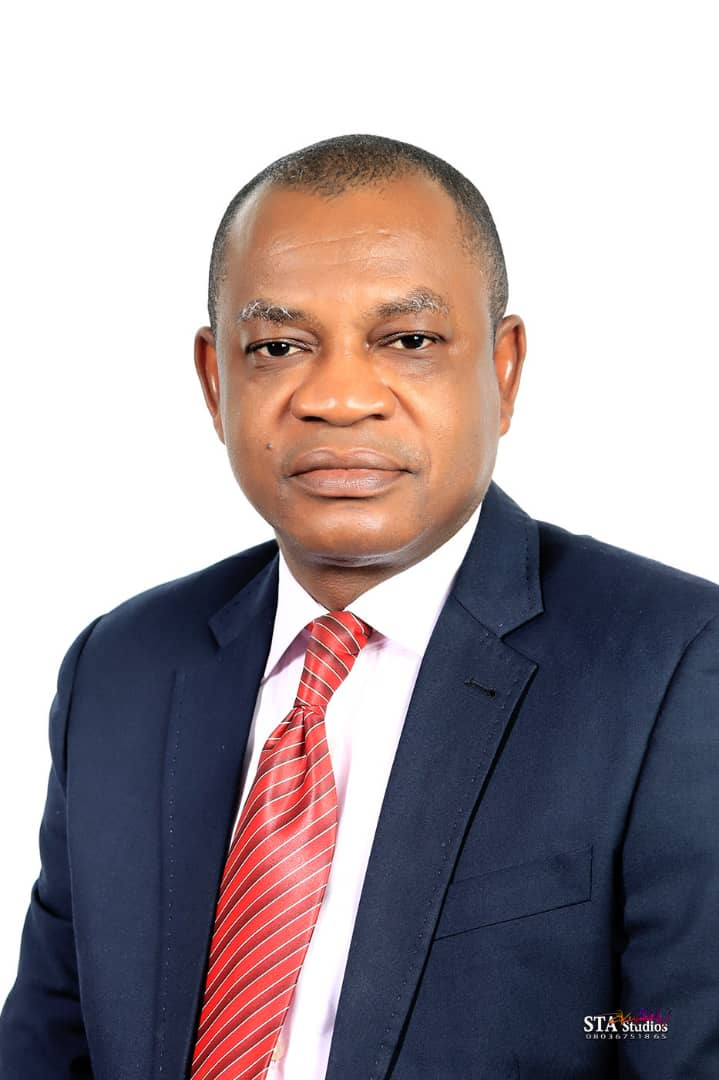
- Born: Ikechukwu Nosike Simplicius Dozie; 3 March 1966 (age 60); Umuokisi Amuzi, Ahiazu Mbaise, Imo State, Nigeria

Academic background
- Education: University of Nigeria, BSc in Microbiology/Biochemistry; University of Nigeria, Master's degree in Medical Microbiology; University of Jos, Doctor of Philosophy in Public Health Parasitology; Galilee International Management Institute, (GIMI) Israel
- Thesis: Onchocerciasis in Imo state, Nigeria (2): the prevalence, intensity and distribution in the upper Imo river basin (2007)
- Doctoral advisor: Celestine Onwuliri

Academic work
- Discipline: Public health scientist
- Institutions: Federal University of Technology, Owerri

Ikechukwu Nosike Simplicius Dozie // (born 3 March 1966) is a Nigerian professor of microbiology and a public health scientist currently serving at the Department of Public Health in the Federal University of Technology Owerri. With microbiology, he has focused on medical microbiology and parasitology.

He is a member of the American Society of Tropical Medicine and Hygiene (ASTMH). Dozie was a consultant to the World Health Organization's African program for Onchocerciasis. He was the Director of: Linkages and Advancement, Federal University of Technology Owerri and most recently became the Vice Chancellor Elect of the institution.

== Early life and education ==
Dozie was born in Umuokisi Amuzi, Ahiazu Mbaise in Imo State, Nigeria. He earned his First School Leaving Certificate from Agbani Road Primary School, Enugu, and went on to attend Mbaise Secondary School, Aboh-Mbaise, where he obtained the West Africa School Certificate with Division One in 1980. Dozie holds a BSc combined honours in microbiology/biochemistry and an MSc medical microbiology from the University of Nigeria, Nsukka and a PhD in Public Health Parasitology from the University of Jos. His quest for further skill sets in higher education management took him to Galilee International Management Institute (GIMI) Israel in 2010 and 2014.

== Professional career ==
Dozie started his teaching career in 1992 as an assistant lecturer at Imo State University Owerri, Nigeria, where he was promoted to the rank of a professor in 2005. He was engaged as a visiting professor at the Federal University of Technology Owerri between 2007 and 2010 while on leave of absence from Imo State University Owerri. He was Head, Department of Public Health Technology, Dean, School of Health Technology and member of the 11th Governing Council of the Federal University of Technology Owerri.

Dozie's engagement in other national assignments includes Panel Moderator at the 2nd High-Level Meeting (HLM) of the Global Power Women Network Africa (GPWNA) organized by the Government of Nigeria in collaboration with the African Union and with support of UNAIDS, Abuja June 27–28, 2013; Facilitator, Induction Course for Ambassador-Designates by Ministry of Foreign Affairs Nigeria, December 9–13, 2013; Panelist, 2014 Commonwealth Scholarship and Fellowship Plan (CSFP) Selection Interview, Federal Ministry of Education Federal Scholarship Board, Nanet Suites Abuja, December 1–5, 2014; and member, Imo State Government Transition Technical Committee (April, 2019).

Dozie is a member of many academic societies and professional association. These include:

- American Society of Tropical Medicine & Hygiene (ASTMH);
- International AIDS Society (IAS); Zoological Society of Nigeria (Life Member) (ZSN);
- Nigerian Society of Microbiology (NSM); Parasitology and Public Health Society of Nigeria (PPSN);
- Biotechnology Society of Nigeria (BSN); Council for Intellectual Cooperation of Nigeria (COFICON);
- Council of Democratic Scholars of Nigeria (CODES);
- Renewable and Alternative Energy Society of Nigeria (RAESON).

He was elected, Council Member, Parasitology and Public Health Society of Nigeria (PPSN) as South East Zonal Coordinator of (2011- 2016).

He is the chairman of the Chaplaincy Pastoral Council of St. Thomas Aquinas Catholic Chaplaincy, FUT Owerri.

== Research ==
He had in the past carried out studies on onchocerciasis (river blindness), lymphatic filariasis, guinea worm (dracunculiasis).

His current research interest includes ecology, epidemiology, socioeconomic aspects and control of infectious diseases of tropical prevalence, in particular:

- Tuberculosis, HIV/AIDS, malaria, cryptosporidiosis, control of filariasis, onchocerciasis (river blindness), schistosomiasis, dracunculiasis (guinea worm), loiasis etc.;
- Sexually transmitted infections (STIs) and reproductive health issues;
- Environmental sanitation, hygiene and infection control;
- Exploring the potential use of whole plant therapies as compliments to anti-malarial pharmaceuticals.

He has contributed to national and international scientific endeavors, some of which include Council for the Development of Social Science Research in Africa (CODESRIA) through (35/T96) Research Grant on: Socio-cultural and Economic Consequences of Onchocercal dermatitis in the Imo River basin of South Eastern Nigeria; UNDP/WORLD BANK/WHO Special Programme for Research and Training in Tropical Diseases, (TDR) (No. 970533) Research Grant on: Onchocerciasis and its Socioeconomic Effects in the Imo River Basin, South Eastern Nigeria; TDR Geneva Director's Initiative Fund (DIF ID: 931087) on: Lymphatic filariasis and Onchocerciasis in the Rainforest of Nigeria: the Social Effects of Genital Complications among Women as a coinvestigator; National Onchocerciasis Control Programme (NOCP) Nigeria, Consultant on Rapid Epidemiological Mapping of Onchocerciasis (REMO) in Nigeria (Team Leader to Taraba, Katsina & Akwa-Ibom States during REMO refinement exercise in Nigeria (November–December, 2000); and World Health Organization/African Programme for Onchocerciasis Control (WHO/APOC), Temporary Adviser on Rapid Epidemiological Mapping of Onchocerciasis (REMO) in South Sudan (February 28-March 28, 2003).

== Awards and recognition ==
Prof Dozie is a recipient of many honors and awards. They include:

- Fellow of the Society for Environmental and Public Health of Nigeria (FSEPHON), July 2019.
- Fellow of the Parasitology and Public Health Society of Nigeria (FPPSN), October, 2017;
- Fellow of the Postgraduate College of Environmental Health Science, Nigeria (FPCEHSN), October 2016;
- Fellow of the African Scientific Institute (ASI.F), September 2010;
- International Research Award by Middle States African Studies Association, West Virginia State College, US (May, 2000).

== Publications ==
- DOZIE, INS; OKEKE, CN & UNAEZE, NC. A thermostable, alkaline-active keratinolytic proteinase from Chrysosporium keratinophilum. World Journal of Microbiology and Biotechnology 10: 563-567 (1994).
- DOZIE, INS; ONWULIRI, COE; NWOKE, BEB. Onchocerciasis in Imo State. Community knowledge and beliefs about transmission, treatment and prevention. Public Health, 118(2): 128-130 (2004).
- DOZIE, INS; ONWULIRI, COE; NWOKE, BEB. Onchocerciasis in Imo State, Nigeria. 2. The prevalence, intensity and distribution in the Upper Imo River Basin. International Journal of Environmental Health Research, 14(5): 359-369
- DOZIE, INS; ONWULIRI, COE; NWOKE, BEB; ONWULIRI, VA. Clinical and parasitological aspects of onchocercal skin diseases in Nigeria. Tropical Doctor, 35 (3): 142-144 (2005).
- DOZIE, INS; ONWULIRI, COE; NWOKE, BEB; CHUKWUOCHA, UM; CHIKWENDU, CI; OKORO, I; NJEMANZE, PC. Onchocerciasis and epilepsy in parts of the Imo River Basin, Nigeria: A preliminary report. Public Health, 120 (5): 448-450 (2006).
- DOZIE, INS; ONWULIRI, COE; NWOKE, BEB; CHUKWUOCHA, UM; NWOKE, EA. Prevalence of lymphatic complications due to Onchocerciasis infection. Nigerian Journal of Parasitology, 27: 23-28 (2006).
- CHUKWOCHA, UM & DOZIE, INS. Malaria transmission and mobidity patterns in holoendemic areas of Imo River Basin of Nigeria. BMC Research Notes, 4: 514-522 (2011)
