= Ngoyi =

Ngoyi is a surname. Notable people with the surname include:

- Elie Ngoyi (born 1988), Canadian football player
- Emomo Eddy Ngoyi (born 1993), Congolese footballer
- Granddi Ngoyi (born 1988), Congolese-French footballer
- Lillian Ngoyi (1911–1980), South African activist

== See also ==
- Ngozi (disambiguation)
