= Okolochi =

Okolochi Okolochi( English Translation Peaceful Land)
- Community
- Location in Nigeria
- Coordinates: 5°19′N 7°06′E
- Country: Nigeria
- State: Imo State
- LGA: Owerri West

Government
  - Type: Traditional
  - Traditional Ruler: HRH Eze Sir C.C. Amadi

Area
  - Total: 1,000 km^{2} (390 sq mi)

Population
  - Ethnicity: Igbo
  - Religion: Christianity Traditional
- Time zone: UTC+1 (WAT)
- 6-digit postal code prefix: 460116
- ISO 3166 code: NG.IM.OW.OK
- National language: Igbo

Okolochi is an ancient community in today's Owerri West Local Government Area of Imo State, Nigeria, it borders Emeabiam, Eziobodo, Ihiagwa and Obibiezena communities. It is one of the host communities of Federal University of Technology, Owerri, FUTO.

== Villages ==
Okolochi is made up of five villages, with one culture and tradition. The villages are arranged in descending order to prove seniority.

1. Umuechekwuru
2. Umuiwuala
3. Umuchieze
4. Umuohamara
5. Umumoche

In addition, Umuechekwuru, Umuiwuala and Umuchieze villages can marry from Umuohamara and Umumoche, and vice versa. This act helps the community to maintain peace and union with each other. Umuechekwuru, Umuiwuala and Umuchieze villages are nicknamed "Umunaka" while Umuohamara and Umumoche are referred to as "Umuejimola".

== History ==
Three other communities namely, Ihiagwa, Emeabiam and Eziobodo were formerly under one autonomous known as Oche, with Okolochi as their headquarters and His Royal Highness Eze Dickson Osuji as the king of oche autonomous community. This continued for years before Ihiagwa pulled out and establish their own autonomous. Mba Ato Community (three-member community) was formed immediately Ihiagwa pulled out, to ensure there was unity between the remaining communities under Okolochi headquarters. Late HRH Eze FINO Nwabiri was the traditional ruler of Mba Ato Communities until Emeabiam and Eziobodo gained their own autonomous. Okolochi people welcome strangers who come to reside with them, and has been known of their hospitality and peaceful conducts.

Okolochi together with other host communities, accused Federal University of Technology, Owerri (FUTO) of plotting to manipulate the Memorandum of Understanding made between the university and host communities. The host communities had maintained that the federal government had forcefully taken more than 4,455 hectares of their land in 1982, resulting to their suffering of untold hardship for want of farmland.

== Culture ==
Okolochi is known for Mbubo Uzo annual festival that usually takes place during farming season, around February. Inhabitants of the community are required to gather at the festival with their farming equipment such as cutlass, holes, and crop seeds that will be cultivated in their farm lands, they will be blessed before they commence farming proper.

The community considers it a sacrilege to kill or eat Python as many believed that they worship it. This tradition was practiced years back and no longer in existence as Christianity tirelessly fought against it.

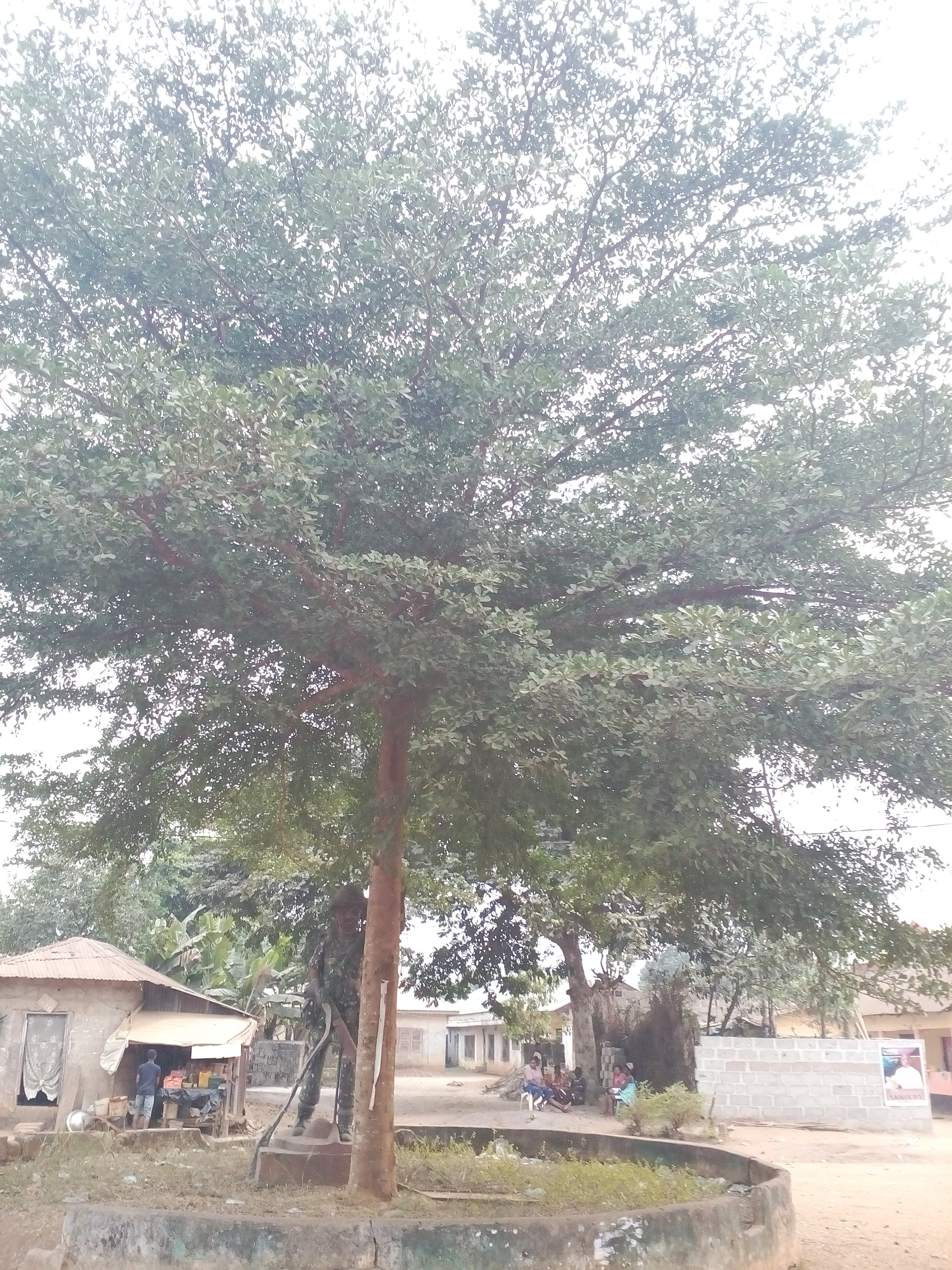
Major roundabout in Okolochi Community

== Kingship ==
Before the kingship of HRH Eze FINO Nwabiri, HRH Eze dickson osuji was the first traditional ruler (Eze) in Okolochi, who ruled before HRH Eze nwabiri took over and ruled for over 40 years. His jurisdiction included Ihiagwa, Eziobodo and Emeabiam under Oche autonomous, before Ihiagwa pulled out which gave birth to Mba Ato community. Eze Nwabiri died in 2015 and was succeeded by HRH Eze Sir C. C. Amadi in 2018. Kingship in Okolochi is rotatory which allows villages to produce an Eze after a year of memorial of the immediate late Eze. Eze Nwabiri was from Umumoche village and was succeeded by Eze C. C. Amadi from Umuiwuala village.

== Education ==
Community School Okolochi is a major Primary School in the community until St. Peters Nursery and Primary School, an Anglican Church owned school was established. Community School Okolochi was considered by some people as a Roman Catholic Church Mission School owned by St. Joseph Catholic Parish, Okolochi. The community has not been able to erect a Secondary School structure till date.

== Health ==
Okolochi Health Centre is a community owned health centre in Okolochi, recognized by the Federal Ministry of Health of Nigeria. The health centre was built by the Udodiri Ndom Okolochi Women Association years back. Government agencies like UNICEF have been recognizing the Udoiri representatives in events that require their presence and opinions, thus the current prepresentation by Mrs Clara Nkwocha.

== Politics ==
According to Independent National Electoral Commission (INEC), Okolochi and Emeabiam are in the same ward known as Emeabiam/Okolochi Ward 4, with the total number of 21 polling units.

== Notable people ==
- Charity Opara, a prominent person in Okolochi was a former Nigerian track and field athlete
- Okolochi begot the late veteran Nollywood actress, Jennifer Okere, who was lost to death in 1999. She was one of the pioneers of Nollywood in the 1990's
