= Kelechi Emeteole =

Nigerian footballer (1951–2017)

Kelechi Emeteole (1951 – 21 June 2017) was a Nigerian football player and coach. He was part of the Nigeria national team at the 1976 African Cup of Nations hosted in Ethiopia. Throughout his career, he coached various teams, including Heartland F.C., Enugu Rangers, El-Kanemi Warriors F.C. and the national beach soccer team.

== Playing career ==
Emeteole played 17 matches for the Nigeria football team scoring four goals between 1975 and 1977. He was part of the squad at the 1976 African Cup of Nations where Nigeria won the bronze medal. He was popularly called 'Caterpillar' for his rugged defensive style.

== Coaching career ==
Emeteole was assistant coach of the Super Eagles team and head coach of Heartland F.C., Enugu Rangers, El-Kanemi Warriors F.C. and the national beach soccer team. He coached the beach soccer team, known as the Super Sand Eagles, from 2007 to 2009. While he was coach of Iwuanyanwu Nationale (now called Heartland FC) in 2009, the team reached the CAF Champions League finals. In April 2017, an angry mob had attacked Emeteole, who was then coach of Enugu Rangers, after they had lost a match. He was sacked as coach in May 2015, after being in charge for three months. He was hired as coach by El-Kanemi Warriors of Maiduguri in August 2015.

== Personal life ==
Emeteole was married to Phoebe Emeteole and had children.

== Health issues and death ==
Emeteole reported loss of voice after the last match between El Kanemi Warriors and Heartland Football Club of Owerri in December 2015. He had faced similar issues before. In January 2016 the Federal Medical Centre, Owerri conducted biopsy but diagnosed it to be infection. In October 2016 he was diagnosed of throat cancer at the Lagos University Teaching Hospital. For his treatment in India, he reportedly needed US$ 11,000. He received financial helps from the Nigeria Soccer Federation-United States of America (NSF-USA), Imo Foundation, Super Eagles defender Kenneth Omeruo, and politician Ugonna Ozurigbo for his treatment.

Emeteole had travelled to India for throat cancer surgery but died on 21 June 2017 at a hospital in New Delhi, at the age of 66, after developing breathing complications during treatment.
