= Glamour Girls (1994 film) =

1994 Nigerian film

- Directed by: Chika Onukwufor.
- Written by: Kenneth Nnebue
- Produced by: Kenneth Nnebue
- Starring: Liz Benson; Ngozi Ezeonu; Eucharia Anuobi; Pat Attah; Ernest Obi; Zack Orji; Dolly Unachukwu
- Release dates: 1994 (Part 1); 1996 (Part 2)
- Country: Nigeria
- Language: English

Glamour Girls is a two-part Nollywood film about independent single women embarking on their independence within Nigeria's traditionally patriarchal society through escorting. The film gained widespread popularity in Nigeria, and starred Liz Benson, Ngozi Ikpelue, Eucharia Anunobi, Pat Attah, Ernest Obi, Zack Orji, and others.

== Plot ==
=== Part I - Glamour Girls ===
Frustrated with her limited achievements and an inability to hold down a stable relationship with eligible suitors, penniless call girl Sandra (Jennifer Okere) moves to Lagos after her close friend Doris (Gloria Anozie) offers to help her find her footing as a 'senior girl'. With the help of Doris and the latter's other friend Thelma (Ngozi Ikpelue), Sandra meets the wealthy Esiri (Peter Bunor), who instantly proposes marriage and offers her a job with his bank, but this new status is threatened when Dennis (Pat Attah), a struggling job-seeker several years younger than Sandra, takes an interest in her. Sandra is torn between the two men but eventually chooses Dennis, to the chagrin of the scorned Esiri, who vows to ruin Sandra. Doris, who has since fallen out with her old friend following an argument, approves of his decision.

Jane (Liz Benson), another Lagos 'senior girl' who attended school with Doris and Thelma, is set to marry Desmond (Sola Fosudo), a wealthy businessman who remains devoted to his fiancée despite receiving a warning from her scheming stepmother, who reveals sordid details of Jane's promiscuous past. After Desmond is involved in an automobile accident that leaves him disabled, Jane catches the eye of presidential aspirant Alex (Raymond Johnson), who urges her to leave Desmond for himself. She soon discovers her new lover's presidential aspirations are a fraud to con her out of her money after she divorces Desmond, who is still recovering in the hospital. Jane regrets meeting Alex and plots revenge.

In a nod to Pretty Woman, high-class hooker Helen (Barbara Odoh) agrees to spend a week with a software entrepreneur (JT Tom West) after he hires her for the night and is mesmerised by her beauty and background. Before their meeting she had entered prostitution as a means of acquiring materialism, accused innocent men of refusing to pay for her services, blackmailed regular customer Esiri with scandalous photos, and nearly slept with her brother (Keppy Ekpenyoung-Bassey).

=== Part II - Glamour Girls: The Italian Connection ===
The second part of the film—Glamour Girls: The Italian Connection—focuses mainly on prostitution. Thelma has since married and moved abroad, but Sandra finds herself in dire straits after Esiri terminates their arrangement. She once again approaches Doris, now a procurer trafficking young girls exploited as sex workers in Italy. Sandra travels there, where she works as a prostitute, distraught to discover her new boss, Maureen (Dolly Unachukwu), receives her fees. Maureen is a ruthless pimp who has tricked families in Nigeria into sending their daughters abroad for a better life when in reality they are forced to work as prostitutes or face dire consequences.

== Cast ==
- Liz Benson - Jane
- Jennifer Okere - Sandra
- Gloria Anozie - Doris
- Ngozi Ezeonu (Credited as Ngozi Ikpelue) - Thelma
- Barbara Odoh - Helen
- Raymond Johnson - Alex
- Zack Orji (Credited as Zachee Orji) - Fred
- Eucharia Anunobi - Anita
- Tina Amuziam - Jessica
- Clarion Chukwura (Credited as Clarion Abiola) - Vera
- Dolly Unachukwu - Maureen
- Remi Abiola - Party Girl
- Kingsley Ahizu - Jude
- Emmanuel France - Native Doctor
- Uduak Johnson - Cecil
- Thelma Nwosu - Laura
- Jide Olajuwon - Alhaji
- Voltron Tony - Bruce

== Reception ==
Commenting on the film, Jonathan Haynes opines that: “...[Nnebue’s] inventive formal strategies permit surveying of an extensive social space. "Glamour Girls" (or "senior girls") are professional women living outside of patriarchal control—scandalous figures in the Nigerian social imagination, associated with prostitution and danger.”

== Production ==
The film was produced and written by Kenneth Nnebue, and directed by Chika Onukwufor.

== Remake ==
Glamour Girls would inspire the similarly-named but unrelated male version Glamour Boys, directed by Jeta Amata and released in 1996, which garnered less recognition. On 12 December 2019, it was announced that filmmaker Charles Okpaleke had acquired the lifetime copyrights of the 1994 blockbuster for a modern remake under his production company, Play Network Africa. The film was released via Netflix in June 2022, opening to negative reviews.
