= Kpali =

2019 Nigerian comedy film

- Directed by: Ladipo Johnson
- Screenplay by: Ebele Enebeli
- Produced by: Emem Ema
- Starring: Ini Dima-Okojie; Nkem Owoh; Gloria Anozie Young; Linda Ejiofor; Kunle Remi
- Production company: Vzhun Films
- Distributed by: Genesis Deluxe Distribution (GDD)
- Release date: 20 December 2019 (Nigeria)
- Running time: 85 minutes
- Country: Nigeria
- Language: English

Kpali is a 2019 Nigerian comedy film directed by Ladipo Johnson and produced by Emem Ema, the movie stars Ini Dima-Okojie, Nkem Owoh, Gloria Anozie Young, Linda Ejiofor and Kunle Remi. ‘Kpali’ is term that is generally recognized in Nigerian pop culture as a term for passport or certificates which was applied in the same way in the movie.

== Plot ==
Kpali tells the story of 20-something year old London-based workaholic single investment banker, Amaka Kalayor, who has no time for anything else aside from her job. Amaka's parents constantly nag her to get married. They get the perfect opportunity when Amaka is sent to Nigeria alongside her Caucasian colleague, Jack Hunter to close a multi-billion Naira deal. Unbeknownst to them, her ability to stay in London and retain her visa (kpali) is dependent on a 30-day deadline based on the outcome of the deal. Amaka's parents mistake Jack for her fiancé and simply see an opportunity to execute two weddings – Amaka’s and her sister Anuli’s. Amaka gets torn between two men when she becomes closer to her colleague, Jack and her brother-in-law's cousin, Jidenna.

== Cast ==
- Ini Dima-Okojie as Amaka Kalayor
- Torin Pocock as Jack Hunter
- Nkem Owoh as Mr. Kalayor
- Gloria Anozie-Young as Mrs. Kalayor
- Linda Ejiofor as Amaka's sister, Anuli
- Kunle Remi as Jidenna
- Ade Adefeko
- Olakunle Fawole
- Nkem Merchie
- IK Osakioduwa
- Uzor Arukwe
- Seyi Law
- Namir Sakr

== Production and release ==
Kpali was shot in different locations in Lagos and London. The movie opened in cinemas on 20 December 2019.

== Reception ==
Gbenga Bada of Pulse Nigeria in his review said "‘Kpali’ is not totally predictable, nevertheless, it's funny, relatable and it’s just the kind of comedy movie most Nigerians love."

Toni Kan of The Lagos Review said "But as Nollywood movies go, this is a feel-good romp and a very relatable movie that will appeal to millennials who are battling that transition from dependency to independence while evading that pesky question – Nne, when are you getting married?"

Nollywood Reinvented compared watching Kpali to "watching a drawn-out skit that just refuses to end."
