= Glamour Girls (2022 film) =

- Directed by: Bunmi Ajakaiye
- Written by: Kemi Adesoye
- Produced by: Abimbola Craig & Charles Okpaleke
- Starring: Nse Ikpe-Etim; Sharon Ooja; Joselyn Dumas; Toke Makinwa; Segilola Ogidan
- Cinematography: KC Obiajulu
- Music by: Tatenda Terence Kamera
- Distributed by: Netflix
- Release date: 24 June 2022
- Country: Nigeria
- Languages: English; Nigerian Pidgin; Igbo; Yoruba; French

Glamour Girls is a 2022 Nigerian movie directed by Bunmi Adesoye and produced by Abimbola Craig. Released on Netflix, it stars Nse Ikpe-Etim, Sharon Ooja, Joselyn Dumas, Toke Makinwa and Segilola Ogidan as women embarking on glamorous and luxurious lifestyles through escorting. Glamour Girls was initially touted as a remake of the 1994 film of the same name, but subsequently metamorphosed into a reconstruction of the original story with an entirely different storyline and different characters, and some actors from the 1994 movie also appeared.

== Plot ==
After Emma is fired from her stripping job, she desperately approaches Donna—an interior designer moonlighting as a procurer—who rejects the aspiring high-end call girl on the grounds of unsuitability, but reconsiders after Emma assures Donna of her potential. A makeover follows, and the uncouth Emma is introduced to the world of high-class escorting but snubbed by Donna's snooty clientele until Zeribe — a bodyguard who confesses to framing her for theft at the strip club — presents Emma to his new boss Segun who gradually takes a shine to Donna's new recruit.

Louisa — a boutique owner also in Donna's employment — is shocked upon discovering her America-based husband Aaron has flown into Nigeria to surprise her and their two daughters. She manages to conceal her secret profession, but Aaron is increasingly suspicious when she frequently leaves their residence late at night under false pretences to meet up with her Lebanese lover, Fadi. Donna advises her to send Aaron back to America before he discovers the truth, but he extends his stay.

Jemma visits her former friend Donna who has not forgiven her for breaking the escort agency's golden rule: Never give your love for free. Jemma's terminally ill husband, Desmond, faces life-support withdrawal unless his wife settles his medical bills. She initially turns down Donna's request to return to escorting in exchange for money but eventually gives in after running out of options. At a high-profile party she attends with Donna and her girls, Jemma catches the eye of Alexander, a business associate of billionaire Chief Nkem with whom Donna enjoys the occasional dalliance. Jemma and Alexander spend the night together and instantly begin a relationship. Soon after, Desmond's life support machine is switched off.

Six months after Emma completes finishing school and a business course in Ireland, Segun uses his connections to secure her a job as a bank manager despite her limited qualifications. However, he refuses to interfere when his daughter publicly exposes Emma's past, and humiliates her further by demanding a striptease with Zeribe also present. Enraged, she storms off, but Zeribe suggests she obey Segun's orders lest he replaces her with another woman. She reluctantly agrees, but not before seducing Zeribe, and Segun hears them having sex under his roof but does not retaliate. Trouble also ensues in Louise's home after Aaron finally stumbles on his wife's secret rendezvous with Fadi, and he flees back to America with their daughters, demanding their mother pay child support or face his wrath.

Jemma murders Alexander when she catches him sexually molesting her son, and enlists the help of both Donna and the latter's personal assistant Tommy, to dispose of the body. Donna receives more devastating news when Hell — an escort from a wealthy family — dies of a drug overdose after discovering she is pregnant without knowledge of the father's identity. At the funeral, Nkem reveals Alexander was his accountant, but as Jemma was romantically involved with him, she is considered a suspect after a hard drive with his company's billions disappears. Donna travels to Beirut where she begs her mentors—Doris and Thelma from the original movie—to plea with Nkem who has started to harass her girls, but both women are unwilling to co-operate.

Upon Donna's return to Nigeria, the escorts finally locate the drive (Alexander had worn it as a pendant), and with the assistance of a Francophone hacker who demands sex with Emma in exchange for his service, they discover the drive contains a larger sum than anticipated. However, Zeribe double-crosses the women and secretly plants a duplicate on Emma, who, in a repeat of events at their first meeting, hides the actual drive in his pocket, and Nkem's henchmen cart him off, his pleas of innocence falling on deaf ears. The film concludes with the revelation that Donna had secretly duplicated the flash drive containing part of the money.

== Cast ==
- Nse Ikpe-Etim as Donna
- Sharon Ooja as Emmanuella (Emma)
- Joselyn Dumas as Jemma
- Toke Makinwa as Louisa (Lulu)
- Segilola Ogidan as Helion (Hell)
- Uzor Arukwe as Aaron
- Temisan Emmanuel as Tommy
- Lynxxx as Alexander
- James Gardiner as Zeribe
- Ejike Asiegbu as Nze
- Femi Branch as Segun (Sheggy)
- Gloria Anozie-Young as Queenpin Doris
- Dolly Unachukwu as Queenpin Thelma*
- Ibrahim Jammal as Kenneth

=== Notes ===
Unachukwu—Maureen in the original movie—was cast as Thelma in the 2022 remake, originally played by Ngozi Ezeonu.

== Reception ==
Reviews for Glamour Girls were negative, with Pulse Nigeria describing the film as "a story with no story". Premium Times praised Glamour Girls' cinematography and filming locations, but criticised the plot, performances, and audio, comparing it to Chief Daddy 2, another Nollywood movie with subpar reviews, while Nollywood Post criticised the movie's weak plot.
