= Francis Chukwuemeka Eze =

Nigerian physicist and researcher

Vice Chancellor, Federal University of Technology, Owerri
- In office 2016–2021

Personal details
- Born: 13 October 1956 (age 69) Ideato South LGA, Imo State
- Spouse: Dr. (Mrs.) Egejuru Eze
- Children: Obinna Eze, Nonso Eze, Ike Eze, Ify Eze
- Education: University of Nigeria, Nsukka

Francis Chukwuemeka Ezeis a Nigerian physicist and researcher. He was the vice chancellor of Federal University of Technology, Owerri. He is a recipient of the Commonwealth Academy Staff Scholarship award, Association Commonwealth Universities, London, 1983; grantee, International Committee Science Unions, India, 1995. Member of Nigerian University Physics Series (secretary since 2002), Nigerian Institute Physics.

== Background ==
Eze was born on October 13, 1956, in Onitsha, Anambra, Nigeria, to the family of Clement Diwoha and Grace Martha Ezejimadu.

== Education ==
- Bachelor of Science in Physics with honors, University of Nigeria, Nsukka, 1980.
- Doctor of Philosophy in Solid State Physics and Materials Science, University of Nigeria, Nsukka, 1994.
- Master of Science with honors, University of Dundee, Scotland, 1984.
- Bachelor of Science in Physics with honors, University of Nigeria, Nsukka, 1980.

== Career ==
Eze's lecturing career began in 1981 at Federal University of Technology, Auchi. He became a full professor of physics in 2003, and was elected as vice chancellor of Federal University of Technology, Owerri in 2016, after serving in various administrative positions in the school. Prior to that, he had been appointed a reader in physics at the Federal University of Technology, Owerri on October 1, 1999.

Eze has been a professor of physics at the School of Physical Sciences (formerly part of School of Science), Federal University of Technology, Owerri since 1 October 2003. He defeated an incumbent Dean for the first time in the history of FUTO and has served as a two-term elected dean, School of Science. He served as deputy vice-chancellor (administration) of FUTO, September 13, 2013, to 2016. Eze has over 31 years of university teaching, research and administrative experience spread over seven universities both within and outside Nigeria, within which time he supervised and examined over 300 research projects at B.Sc/B. Tech, M.Sc. and PhD levels. Eze is very active in quality research in experiential solid-state physics and materials science, thin solid films, renewable energy and corrosion inhibition using local herb extracts. He has served as a physics consultant to the International Junior Science Olympiad (IJSO) technical committee. He has also served on the technical committee on developing curricula for postgraduate training in nuclear science and engineering sponsored by NAEC. He also served as a physics consultant to Singaporean writing team on producing and ICT-illustrated Physics textbook – The New System Physics.

Following the end of his tenure as vice-chancellor of FUTO, he handed over to Professor Nnenna Nnannaya Oti who resumed office as the 8th vice-chancellor of the institution on 19 June 2021.

== Memberships ==
- Member of Nigerian University Physics Series (secretary since 2002), Nigerian Institute Physics.
- Council member of the Nigerian Institute of Physics and the Nigerian Physics Writers Creation.
- Two-term elected Chairman, Physics Writer Creation 2010-2014.
- Fellow of the Solar Energy Society of Nigeria (FSESN.
- Fellow of the Nigerian Institute of Physics (FNIP).
- Fellow of the Institute of Industrial Administration of Nigeria (FIIAN)
- Member of the New York Academy of Sciences.
- Member of the American Physical Society
- Member of the Institute of Physics (London)

== Works ==
In a 2017 published paper entitled, Characteristics of Nanocrystallite-CdS Produced by Low-Cost Electrochemical Technique for Thin Film Photovoltaic Application: The Influence of Deposition Voltage, Eze studied the characteristics of five nanocrystallite-CdS thin films within a timed environment. The X-ray results showed the shapes and thickness of the crystallite. Further analysis also discusses the behavior of factions of the findings.
