= Chigozie Christopher =

Nigerian footballer

Personal information
- Full name: Chigozie Christopher
- Date of birth: 20 April 1992 (age 34)
- Place of birth: Bauchi, Nigeria
- Height: 1.69 m (5 ft 6 1/2 in)
- Position: Midfielder

Team information
- Current team: Rangers F.C
- Number: 6

Youth career
- 2007–2008: Bayelsa United

Senior career*
Years	Team	Apps	(Gls)
2008–2010	Bayelsa United	6	(0)
2011–2011	Dolphin F.C.	12	(3)
2012–2013	Heartland F.C.	20	(2)
2014–2015	Bayelsa United	28	(5)
2015–2016	Zesco United	12	(1)
2017–2018	Lobi Stars	15	(0)
2018–2019	→Rangers F.C.	17	(0)
- * Club domestic league appearances and goals

Chigozie Christopher (born 20 April 1992 in Bauchi, Bauchi State) is a Nigerian footballer who plays as a central midfielder for Rangers Football Club of Enugu, Enugu State.

== Career ==
Chigozie began his football career with Bayelsa United and signed for Dolphins F.C of Port Harcourt in 2011 Dolphins F.C., after six months with Dolphins FC he signed for Heartland F.C. of Owerri.

Chiogzie Christopher left Heartland F.C. after a successful season with the Naze Millionaires where he begged the prestigious FA medal within his one-year stay at club his performance earned him the chance to rejoin the newly promoted team in Nigeria Premier League Bayelsa United, and he was very optimistic that Bayelsa United emerged champions that season and also hoping that his performance in 2012/3013 season will earn him a place in the National Teams.

Chigozie signed for Zambia Based Football Club called Zesco United after an explosive performance with Bayelsa United, he returned from a short spell with Zambia Super League side Zesco United. Where he contributed greatly to the success of the club which lead to the winning of the 2015/2016 Zambia Super League despite having a limited play time.

Lobi Stars F.C, Makurdi Benue State came calling for his signature for a period of six months.
