= Chigozie Wisdom =

Nigerian gospel musician (born 1983)

- Born: Chigozie Wisdom Anyanwu; February 24, 1983 (age 43)
- Origin: Imo State
- Genres: Contemporary worship; contemporary gospel
- Occupations: Singer; songwriter
- Instrument: Vocals
- Years active: 2010–present

Chigozie Wisdom Anyanwu (born February 24, 1983), known as Chigozie Wisdom, is a Nigerian male singer. He released his first song in 2010.

== Biography ==
Chigozie Wisdom was born on 24 February 1983, and originally hails from Imo State, Nigeria. He completed his secondary school education at Folamo High School, Lagos State, and acquired his bachelor's degree from Lagos State University, Nigeria.

== Career ==
Chigozie Wisdom started his musical career at a very tender age in the children’s choir. By the age of seven he had become a choir leader in the children’s department. His first album "Bow Down and Worship Him" was released in April, 2017 and comprised 22 tracks including "Kumama", "Messiah" and "Naba Katuwo".

On 3 October 2022, he was among the musicians featured at the 5th edition of the Worship4Change Concert alongside Moses Bliss, Nathaniel Bassey, Victoria Orenze and others.

== Discography ==
=== Albums ===
Year released	Title	Details	Ref
2020	No Limits	Number of Tracks: 3; Formats: Streaming, digital download	
2017	Bow Down and Worship Him	Number of Tracks: 22; Formats: Streaming, digital download	

=== Singles ===
- Ona Iye (2022)
- Bid Me To Come (2022)
- I'll Be There (2021)
- Everything That Has Breath (2021)
- Ese Gan Ni (2020)
- Pada Wale (2017)
- My Commitment (2017)
- I am that I am (2015)
- Praise Adonai (2010)

== Awards and nominations ==
In May 2023, Chigozie Wisdom was given an honorary citizen award from the State of Georgia in the United States of America.

== Personal life ==
Chigozie Wisdom is married with three children. He lives in Lagos State, Nigeria.
