= Zack Orji =

Nigerian actor and filmmaker (born 1960)

- Born: Zachee Ama Orji; 1960 (age 65–66); Libreville, Gabon
- Education: University of Nigeria Nsukka
- Occupation: Actor-Director
- Years active: 1991-present
- Known for: Role in Glamour Girls, and Blood Money.
- Spouse: Ngozi Orji
- Children: 3

Zachee Ama Orji (born 1960) is a Gabon born Nigerian actor, theatre critic, director, producer, and filmmaker known for his role in Nollywood movies Glamour Girls and Blood Money. Aside from acting, Orji is a preacher. He is an indigene of Amata Mgbowo in Agwu Local Government, Enugu State. His father's name is Lionel Chukwuemeka Orji. His middle name is "Amaefuna" which means "May the land/heritage not be lost."

== Early life ==
Zachee Ama Orji was born in Libreville, Gabon, due to his father's frequent travels. He grew up in Cameroon, Benin, and Togo, where he learned how to speak both English and French fluently. He is the eldest in a family of seven children, five girls and two boys.

== Education ==
Orji is a graduate of the University of Nigeria, Nsukka, in Enugu State. He studied estate management and bagged a BSc.

== Career ==
His first movie was in 1991, titled Unforgiven Sin. In an interview with Nollywood Post, Zack Orji shared how he got the lead role in the movie without auditioning. Since then, Orji has starred in different movies and is now a Nollywood legend. He is also a singer and preacher of God's word since he found Christ.

In 2000, Zack Orji made his directorial debut with the movie titled WEB, starring himself and Ghanaian actress Kalsoume Sinare. The movie won best collaborative film in the Ghana awards of 2001.

In 2022, Zack declared his support for Tinubu for president in the 2023 presidential election. He has featured in over 250 Nollywood movies. His 1994 film, Glamour Girls, shot him into the limelight, and since then he has been regarded as one of the most influential Nollywood actors.

== Personal life ==
Zack Orji is married to Ngozi Orji, has three children, and lives in Nigeria. He is a philanthropist who owns a charity organization set up to help people living with disabilities and help the less privileged. He was a former president of the Actor's Guild of Nigeria. He is also into other businesses, some of which include real estate. He is very active on social media.

In a 2024 interview with Punch Nigeria, Zack Orji revealed that he underwent two brain surgeries in the country, an experience that taught him to have faith in the Nigerian healthcare system.

== Filmography ==
- Unforgiven Sin (1991)
- Living in Bondage (1992)
- Iva (1993)
- Living in Bondage 2 (1993)
- Glamour Girls (1994) as Fred
- Nneka the Pretty Serpent (1994)
- Rattle Snake (1995)
- True Confession (1995)
- Brotherhood of the Darkness (1995) as Pastor Josiah
- Blood on My Hands (1996)
- Deadly Passion (1996)
- Glamour Girls 2 (1996)
- Silent Night (1996)
- Love in Vendetta (1996)
- Abandon (1997)
- Blood Money (1997) as Mike Mouka
- Blood Vapour (1997)
- Desperate & Dangerous (1997)
- Dead End (1997?)
- Deadly Affair II (1997)
- Garbage (1997)
- Golden Fleece (1997)
- Diamond Ring 2 (1998)
- Evil Men (1998)
- Karishika (1998)
- Sakobi 2: The Final Battle (1998)
- Witches (1998) as Desmond
- Day of Reckoning (1999)
- Endtime (1999)
- The Bastard (1999)
- Asimo (1999) as Pastor Tito
- The Visitor (1999) as Frank
- Lost Hope (2000) as Maxwell
- Fire Dancer (2001) as Daniel
- Hatred (2001) as Gideon
- Late Arrival (2001)
- Mothering Sunday (2001) as Humphrey
- Mothers Cry (2001)
- Fire Dancer (2001) as Daniel
- Last Warning (2002) as Obidike
- Submission (2002)
- Days of Glory (2002?)
- Endtime 2 (2003)
- Oga and His Boys (2003) as Ejike
- Bonds of Tradition (2004) (also director)
- Games Women Play (2005) as Damian
- Women's Cot (2005)
- Chameleon (2006)
- Light Out (2006)
- The Blues Kingdom (2007) (director only)
- Land of Shadow (2010) (also director)
- Tongue (2014) as Pastor Michael
- Head Gone (2015?)
- Brothers of Faith (2016?)
- Three Wise Men (2017)
- Descent (2017) as Kalu Achebe
- Payday (2018) as Mr. Afolayan
- Just One Blood (2018) as Chief Odogwu
- The Williams (2018) as Mr. Williams
- Code Wilo (2019)
- Our Jesus Story (2020)
- Sweet Face (2020) as Old Tobi
- Big Town (2021)
- Love Castle (2021) as Chizutere's Father
- Blood Sisters (2022) as David
- Half Of a Yellow Sun (2013) as Chief Ozobia
- The Other Man (2022)
- The Other Wife (2022)
- Inside Life (2022)
- Violet (2023) as Mr. Chris
- Black Harvest (2023)
- Flip Side (2023) as Chief Uzoma
- Terror Muda in Courier Justice (2024) as Chief Abidjan
- Something About the Briggs (2025)
