= Ngozi Alaegbu =

Nigerian broadcast journalist

- Education: University of Hamburg, Germany
- Occupations: Broadcast Journalist, TV Presenter
- Organization: Arise TV

Ngozi Alaegbu is a Nigerian broadcast journalist and TV presenter. She has worked at Degue Broadcasting Network (DBN), Television Continental (TVC) and currently works with Arise TV.

== Biography ==
Alaegbu studied German at the University of Hamburg, Germany. She started her career by working with DBN. She thereafter moved to TVC where she spent some years before resigning in August 2019. Alaegbu's transition to Arise TV happened in February 2020.

== Awards/recognition ==
Alaegbu won the Television Newscaster of the Year Award at the 2021 Nigeria Media Merit Awards. She was listed as number 15 on the 2021 25 Most Powerful Women in Journalism list curated by the Women in Journalism Africa.

== Personal life ==
Alaegbu is a mother and grandmother.
