= Ihiagwa =

Town in Imo State, Nigeria

Coordinates: 5°24′N 7°01′E

Ihiagwa is a town in Owerri West Local Government Area of Imo State, Nigeria. It is located 12 km (7.5 mi) south of the capital city of Owerri. The township is composed of eight villages: Umuelem, Umuchima, Mboke, Nnkaramochie, Iriamogu, Aku/Umuokwo, Ibuzo and Umuezeawula. Ihiagwa has been divided into two autonomous communities, namely Ihiagwa Ancient Kingdom (Chimelem), comprising two villages: Umuelem and Umuchima;and Dindi-Ihiagwa, comprising the remaining six villages, all divisions done for administrative and developmental reasons. Each autonomous community is a monarchy ruled by an Eze.

The Ihiagwa people are members of the Igbo ethnic group in the southeastern Nigeria. They number about ten thousand (10,000) and easily identified among the Oratta people of Owerri.

The Ihiagwa people are also referred to as the Aguzieafors i.e. the calendar keepers. This means in those pre-British times the Ihiagwa were responsible for keeping the calendar of the surrounding communities and also had the duty of alerting the surrounding communities of the date for the new yam festival and also other dates.

The Federal University of Technology Owerri (FUTO) is located in Ihiagwa. The Market in Ihiagwa is called 'Nkwo Ukwu'. 'Uzi na Aboshi' is used to denote Nekede and Ihiagwa because they are siblings. The secondary school in Ihiagwa is Ihiagwa Secondary school located at Umuchima. Obiwuruotu is the women dance group of Ihiagwa. Major religion is Christianity. Major religious organizations include Saint John Anglican Church Ihiagwa, Catholic church Ihiagwa, Jehovah's witnesses and Baptist Church Ihiagwa.

The surrounding Towns/Villages to Ihiagwa are Nekede, Eziobodo, Obinze, Naze and Obibiezena. The Otamiri River passes through the Town.
