= Federal Medical Centre, Owerri =

Geography
- Location: Owerri, Southeast Region, Imo state, Nigeria

Organisation
- Care system: Public
- Type: General Teaching hospital

Links
- Website: https://www.fthowerri.gov.ng/
- Lists: Hospitals in Nigeria

Federal Medical Centre, Owerri is a public health care centre located in Owerri city in Imo State, southeastern Nigeria.

== History ==
In 1903, Federal Medical Centre, Owerri was founded as a colonial dispensary. It was promoted to a District Hospital, then a General Hospital, before finally becoming a federal medical centre in 1995. It is a 700-bed capacity hospital.

In May 2023, the Federal Medical Centre, Owerri was formally upgraded and renamed Federal University Teaching Hospital, Owerri (FUTHO) by President Muhammadu Buhari, following approval to support the new medical college at the Federal University of Technology Owerri (FUTO) The facility originally established in 1903 and previously operating as a Federal Medical Centre was elevated to first-grade teaching-hospital status to enhance specialist services, medical education, and research.

== Department ==
There are different departments in federal medical center owerri IMO state.

Department of nursing

Department of medicine

Department of accounting

Department of Accident and emergency

Department of heart

Department of anaesthesia

Department of health educator

Department of medical laboratory

Department of histopathology

Department of social welfare

Department of servicom

Department of Radiology

Department of physiotherapy

Department of gynecology and obstetrics

Department of pharmacy

Department of National health insurance scheme

Department of surgery

Department of orthopedic

Department of ophthalmology

Department of hematology

Department of clinical biochemistry

Department of family medicine

Department of Audits

Department of Boards and directorates.

== CMD ==
The current chief medical director of federal medical center owerri in imo state is Dr. Jideuma Ikenna Egwim.
