= Olugbenga Ashiru =

Nigerian politician

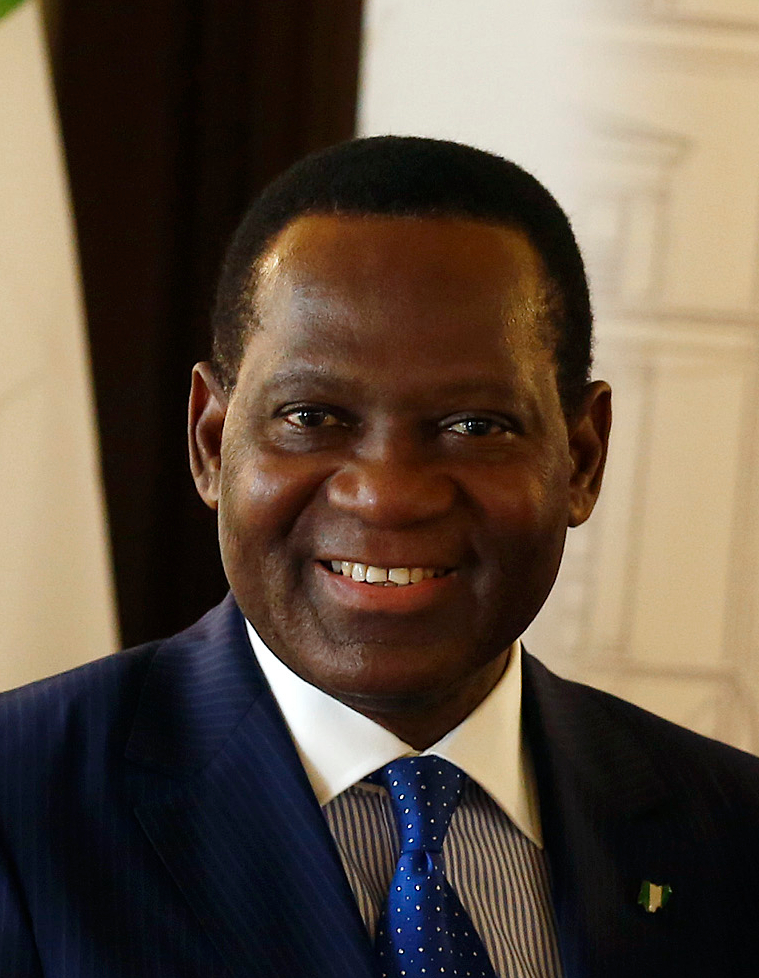
Olugbenga Ashiru in 2013

Olugbenga Ashiru (27 August 1948 – 29 November 2014) was a Nigerian politician and diplomat. He served as the Foreign Minister of Nigeria from 2011 to 2013. A graduate of the University of Lagos and career diplomat, he had previously served as Ambassador to South Korea, and High Commissioner to South Africa. He died in South Africa in November 2014 aged 66.

== Early life and education ==
Olugbenga Ayodeji Ashiru was born on 27 August 1948 in Ijebu Ode, Ogun State, Nigeria. He attended Christ Church Primary School, Ijebu Ode, before proceeding to Ijebu Ode Grammar School for his secondary education. He later studied History at the University of Lagos, where he specialised in International Relations and graduated in 1972. Shortly after completing his university education, he joined Nigeria's Ministry of Foreign Affairs as a Third Secretary, beginning a diplomatic career that spanned more than three decades.

== Diplomatic career ==
Ashiru began his diplomatic career in 1972 as a Third Secretary in the Ministry of Foreign Affairs. During the course of his career, he served in several Nigerian diplomatic missions, including Tokyo, Japan; Stockholm, Sweden; Bangui in the Central African Republic; and London in the United Kingdom. He also served as Nigeria's Ambassador to the Democratic People's Republic of Korea from 1991 to 1999 before returning to the Ministry of Foreign Affairs as Director of Regions and later Under-Secretary responsible for Regions and International Organisations.

He was subsequently appointed Nigeria's High Commissioner to South Africa, with concurrent accreditation to Lesotho and Eswatini (then Swaziland). During this period, he contributed to strengthening Nigeria's diplomatic and economic relations with Southern African countries before retiring from the diplomatic service.

== Minister of Foreign Affairs ==
In July 2011, President Goodluck Jonathan appointed Ashiru Minister of Foreign Affairs. During his tenure, he promoted the use of diplomacy to advance Nigeria's economic interests while maintaining the country's commitment to regional peace, security and cooperation. He represented Nigeria at meetings of the United Nations, the African Union and ECOWAS, where he participated in discussions on regional security, conflict resolution and international cooperation.

As Foreign Minister, Ashiru played a prominent role in resolving the 2012 diplomatic dispute between Nigeria and South Africa following the deportation of Nigerian travellers over yellow fever vaccination requirements. The disagreement was eventually resolved through diplomatic engagement between both countries.

== Foreign policy initiatives and international engagements ==
During his tenure as Nigeria's Minister of Foreign Affairs between 2011 and 2013, Olugbenga Ashiru advocated an "economic diplomacy" approach to Nigeria's foreign policy. He argued that the country's diplomatic engagements should support national development by attracting foreign direct investment, expanding trade opportunities and promoting Nigeria's economic interests while maintaining its traditional leadership role in Africa. He also maintained that Nigeria's foreign policy should enjoy broad public understanding and support, emphasizing that effective diplomacy required collaboration between government institutions, the private sector and Nigerian citizens. According to Ashiru, Nigeria's foreign policy priorities should continue to evolve in response to changing global political and economic realities while remaining anchored on the country's national interests.

As Minister of Foreign Affairs, Ashiru represented Nigeria at several high-level international meetings involving the United Nations, the African Union and ECOWAS. On 10 January 2012, he met with United Nations Secretary-General Ban Ki-moon at the United Nations Headquarters in New York. Their discussions focused on the investigation into the 2011 bombing of the United Nations House in Abuja, maritime security in the Gulf of Guinea, the impact of the Libyan crisis on the Sahel region, and peacekeeping operations in Somalia and Sudan.

In November 2012, Ashiru again met with Ban Ki-moon to discuss the political crises in Mali and Guinea-Bissau, as well as Nigeria's contribution to peacekeeping operations in Darfur. The meeting reaffirmed Nigeria's commitment to promoting regional peace and security through cooperation with the United Nations and the African Union.

On 26 April 2013, Ashiru held another meeting with Ban Ki-moon during the United Nations General Assembly in New York. Their discussions centred on the security situation in northern Nigeria, the establishment of the United Nations Multidimensional Integrated Stabilization Mission in Mali (MINUSMA), the political transition in Guinea-Bissau, and the deteriorating security situation in Darfur. During the meeting, the Secretary-General also expressed condolences over the deaths of Nigerian peacekeepers serving in Darfur.

Ashiru also strengthened Nigeria's bilateral relations with the United Kingdom. In September 2011, he met with the United Kingdom's Foreign Secretary, William Hague, in London to discuss counter-terrorism cooperation, trade and investment, and developments in Libya, Syria, Iran and Somalia. Both countries reaffirmed their commitment to expanding bilateral relations and increasing economic cooperation.

He also represented Nigeria at the Japan–Nigeria Foreign Ministers' Meeting in Tokyo in July 2012. During the meeting, he held discussions with Japanese Foreign Minister Koichiro Gemba on strengthening bilateral relations, increasing Japanese investment in Nigeria, and expanding cooperation in infrastructure development, disaster risk reduction and economic growth.

During his tenure, Nigeria also strengthened its participation in regional and international organisations. According to Ashiru's handover remarks at the end of his tenure, Nigeria secured more than 20 strategic international positions for its citizens in organisations including the African Union and ECOWAS, a development he described as one of the major achievements of his administration.

== Legacy ==
Olugbenga Ashiru was regarded as one of Nigeria's leading career diplomats, having served the country in the foreign service for more than three decades before becoming Minister of Foreign Affairs. During his diplomatic career, he represented Nigeria in several countries, including South Africa, the United Kingdom, South Korea, and Japan, and played a role in advancing Nigeria's bilateral and multilateral relations.

Following his death on 29 November 2014 in Johannesburg, South Africa, tributes were paid by the Federal Government, members of the diplomatic corps and political leaders, who described him as a dedicated public servant and accomplished diplomat. The Ministry of Foreign Affairs noted his contributions to Nigeria's foreign policy and diplomatic service, while colleagues recalled his commitment to strengthening Nigeria's international relations.

Ashiru's tenure as Minister of Foreign Affairs was associated with Nigeria's efforts to promote economic diplomacy, strengthen regional cooperation and increase the country's participation in international organisations. His contributions continue to be referenced in discussions on the evolution of Nigeria's foreign policy during the administration of President Goodluck Jonathan.
