= Chiedozie Ngozi Egesi =

Nigerian plant scientist and professor

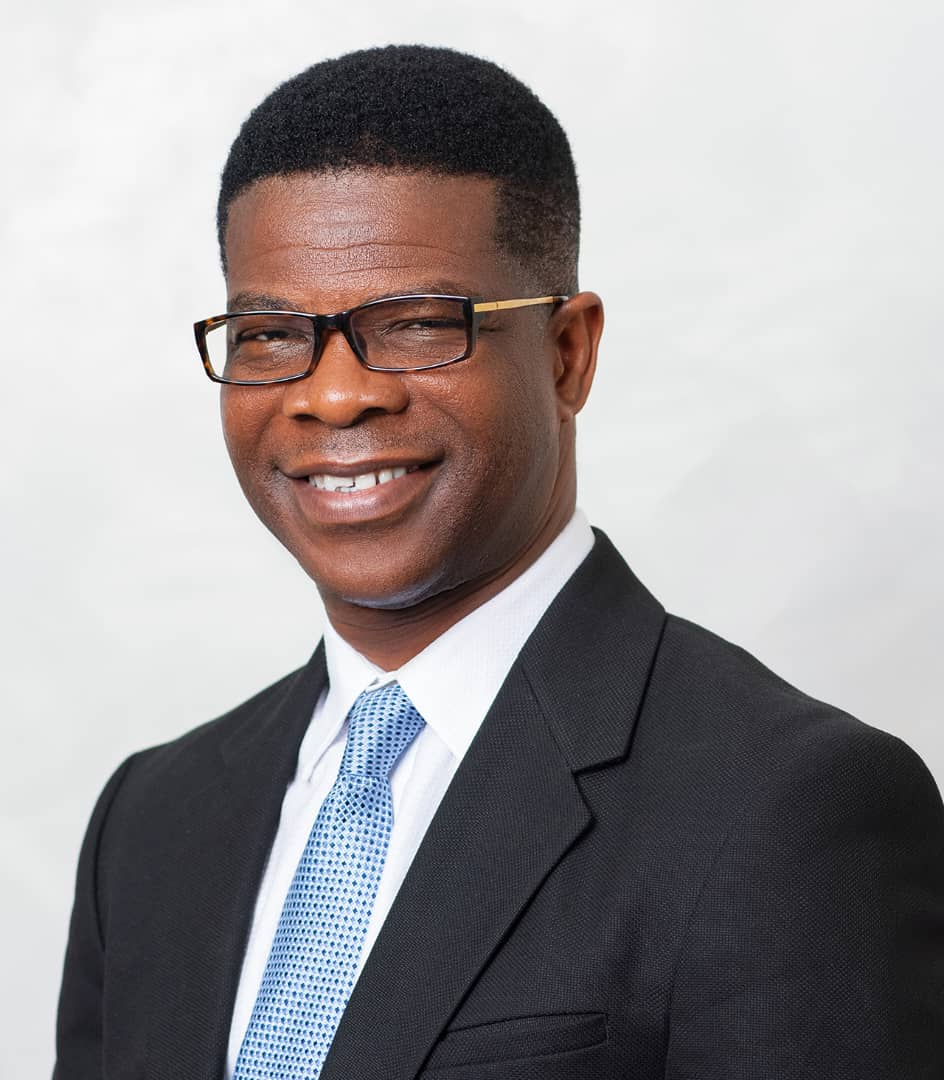
Chiedozie Egesi

Chiedozie Ngozi Egesi is a Nigerian plant scientist and professor. He is director of numerous research projects dedicated to international agriculture, gender equity and food and nutrition security in agriculture. He received the Achiever in Agriculture Award in 2021 by the Nigeria Agriculture Awards in 2021 and the Kwame Nkrumah Leadership Prize in 2022.

== Early life and education ==
Egesi grew up in a farming community in Umuahia South, Abia State. He received a Bachelor of Science from the University of Calabar in 1994 and a Master in Science on Environmental Biology at University of Ibadan in 1997. He earned a Ph.D in Agricultural Biology from University of Ibadan in 2001

He took certificate courses on Statistical Genetics at the University of Washington, Seattle, USA in 2007 and Spring class on Qualitative Trait Loci Analyses and Statistical Genetics at the Cornell University Ithaca, New York in April, 2012.

== Career and research ==
From 2002-2018, Egesi presided over the Leadership of a Cassava Breeding which led to the release of 27 improved cassava varieties in Nigeria including 9 high pro-vitamin A cassava varieties and official release of 10 improved water yam varieties in Nigeria. Some of these varieties have been distributed across some African countries.

Between 2008-2015, Egesi served as an In-Country Product Development Manager (Nigeria), BioCassava Plus Project. He handled several in-country project activities that led to the authorisation for field evaluation of a Genetically Modified Organism crop in Nigeria. He is credited with the facilitation of the biosafety accreditation of Biotechnology Laboratory for transgenic research at the National Root Crops Research Institute Umudike by the National Biosafety Office, Abuja.

Between 2016 and 2022, Egesi was appointed as a Senior Scientist for Next Generation Cassava Breeding Project, at the International Institute of Tropical Agriculture (IITA), Ibadan, Nigeria. As Project leader, he was in charge of the technical leadership and coordination of project activities globally, including the project's multi-country variety and population improvement program, leading to the release of 5 varieties of cassava in Nigeria, and submitted 3 varieties for registration in Uganda and Tanzania

As an Adjunct Professor of Plant Breeding and Genetics at the College of Agriculture and Life Sciences, Cornell University, Ithaca, New York, USA. Egesi oversees the global leadership of Next Generation Cassava project activities globally, including Graduate student mentoring, collaborative international plant breeding, Principal Investigator of global development projects and Board member, Alliance for Science

in his role as a visiting Scientist at the department of Global Development, Cornell University, Ithaca, New York, United States, he took up leadership role for the coordination of Muhogo Bora project including the Collaborative International Cassava Seed System Development.

Between 2018-2020, Egesi served as a visiting professor at the Department of Biotechnology, Alex Ekwueme Federal University, Ndufu-Alike, Ebonyi State, where he taught Biotechnology leading to the department's attaining its accreditation by the National Universities Commission

Currently a Co-Principal Investigator for Muhogo Bora Project, Global Development – College of Agriculture and Life Sciences, Cornell University, USA, Egesi leads the development and implementation of the gender responsive cassava seeds system in Tanzania

Development projects led by Egesi has integrated plant breeding with diverse disciplines, include plant pathology, genomic selection and gender awareness.

As a Global Director for NextGen Cassava, he supported efforts to modernize cassava breeding in sub-Saharan Africa.

In 2022, He was appointed the Executive Director/CEO at National Root Crops Research Institute, Umudike, Nigeria.

== Professional responsibilities ==
- 2025--, President, Africa Potato Association
- 2023 –, Member, Advisory Board, Nestler Project EU.
- 2022- International Consultant at the International Institute of Tropical Agriculture (IITA), Ibadan, Nigeria.
- 2022-, Member, Board of Trustees, Industrial Cassava Stakeholders Association of Nigeria(ISCAN)
- Adjunct Professor, Plant Breeding and Genetics, Cornell University, Ithaca, New York, USA,
- Serving in the National Committee for Development and Implementation of the Plant Variety Protection Act 2021
- 2020–, President, Nigeria Plant Breeders Association
- 2022--, Executive Committee Member, African Plant Breeders Association
- 2019--, Editor, Tropical Plant Biology
- 2017--, Board of Trustees, Alliance for Science, Ithaca, New York, USA
- 2013 – Director (Administration) / Secretary, Board of Trustees; Streams of Joy International, Nigeria
- 2012-, Councillor(West Africa), International Society of Tropical Root Crops
- 2009-2016, Serving in the National Committee for the Development and Implementation of the National Biosafety Act (2009 to 2016)
- Serving in the National Committee for Development of a National Seed Roadmap for Nigeria
- 2005—Serving in the Technical Sub Committee of the National Variety Release Committee
- 2012- Director, Administration, Streams of Joy International
- 2014-2017, Member, Technical Advisory Committee (TAC), New Cassava Varieties and Clean Seed to Combat Cassava Brown Streak Disease and Cassava Mosaic Disease (5CP) Project.
- 2015-2016, Mentor, African Women in Agricultural Research and Development (AWARD). (2015-2016).
- 2010-, Member, National Steering Committee of the Open Forum on Agricultural Biotechnology (OFAB) – Nigeria.
- 2013-, Director (Administration) / Secretary, Board of Trustees; Streams of Joy International, Nigeria

== Awards and honours ==
- 2026, Certificate of Nomination presented by the Global Policy Council of World Agriculture Forum, The Netherlands (1 January 2026)
- 2024, Distinguished Alumnus Award in Recognition of Eminent Leadership role, All-Time support for CPEB and outstanding contribution to Agricultural, Environment, Industry, Capacity building and Research for Development presented by Department of Crop Protection and Environment Biology, Faculty of Agriculture, University of Ibadan.
- 2024, Innovative Leadership Award presented by University of Nigeria Alumni Association at the 115th NEC/Emergency Convention
- 2024, National Institute for Security Studies, Abuja Nigeria presented SYNDICATE 2 Executive Intelligence Management Course (EIMC).
- 2023, Kwame Nkrumah Leadership Prize for Hardwork and Contribution to Societal Development through Agriculture and Human Capital Development presented by Grow African Youth Initiative.
- 2023, Federal Ministry of Finance Budget and National Planning (Budget and National Planning Arm) Resource Person and Partner presented at the Bio-Economy, Innovation and Knowledge Transfer Partnership Cassava –Bioethanol Value Chain Development Pilot
- 2022, Merit Award presented by National Agricultural Foundation of Nigeria at the 2022 National Agricultural Show.
- 2021, Achiever in Agriculture 2021 presented by 2021 Nigeria Agriculture Award
- Recognition of Outstanding Academic Excellence and Mentorship Award presented by Organization for Women in Science for the Developing World Southeast Zone (OWSDSEZ) at the 4th Biennial Conference (5 June 2024)

== Fellowships and positions ==
- Fellow, Biotechnology Society of Nigeria, Fellow
- Fellow, Agricultural Society of Nigeria
- Fellow, Nigerian Plant Breeders Association

== Publications ==
Egesi has 120 publications. see ORCID id: ORCID
