= Emeka Ossai =

Nigerian film actor

- Born: Emeka Ossai; Delta State
- Education: University of Agriculture, Ogun
- Occupation: Actor

Emeke Ossai// is a Nigerian film actor. He won the Best Supporting actor award at the 4th Africa Movie Academy Awards for his performance in the movie "Checkpoint". He is of the opinion that the new Nollywood lacks credibility.

== Personal life ==
Ossai is a native of Ndokwa from Kwale, Utagba-Uno in Ndokwa-West local government of Delta State. He studied Food Technology at the University of Agriculture, Ogun State, Nigeria.

== Filmography ==
- The Trade (2023) as Mr. Arinze
- Fury (2019) as Nathaniel
- Yellow Cassava (2016) as Dr. Zack
- III Conscience (2012) as Kunle
- Checkpoint (2007)
- One Life (2007)
- Women at Large (2007) as Femi
- Greatest Weapon (2006) as Pat
- Occultic Wedding (2006)
- Brain Master (2006) as Martin
- Serpent in Paradise (2006)
- Vuga (2000)
- Executive Mess
