= Chigozie C. Asiabaka =

Nigerian academic

Prof. Chigozie C. Asiabaka

Vice-chancellor of Federal University of Technology Owerri

Personal details
- Born: Chigozie C. Asiabaka; September 29, 1953 (age 73) Awo Idemili, Imo State, Nigeria
- Education: Federal University of Technology Owerri
- Occupation: Academic; author

Chigozie C. Asiabaka // (born September 29, 1953) is a Nigerian academic, who is the 6th substantive vice-chancellor of the Federal University of Technology Owerri (FUTO), in Imo State.

== Early life and biography ==
Chigozie Asiabaka was born in Awo Idemili, Imo State. He attended the Community Sec School, AwoIdemili, Imo State, where he received his Sec school leaving certificate. He attended the University of Georgia, Athens, Georgia, United States of America where he received his Bachelor's (1981) and master's (1982) degrees in Agricultural Extension and earned his PhD in agricultural extension from Louisiana State University, Baton Rouge in 1984.

== Services ==
Chigozie Asiabaka started as a lecturer in FUTO where he lectured for 37 years from 1986 to 2023 . He also served as the co-ordinator of Research & Training Centre in FUTO for five years from 1992 to 1997. He was the Head of Department of Agricultural Economics and Extension, July 1992 to June 30, 2000. He was Director of Centre for Continuing Education in FUTO, 2003-June 18, 2007.He was Dean of the School of Agriculture and Agricultural Technology, July 1, 2007 to June 18, 2011. He was. chairman for Committee of Deans in FUTO for three years from 2009 -2009. He was also the chairman for Endowment Fund Committee from 2002 to 2004 in same institution and as a member of 8th, representing Senate 9th, and 10th Governing Councils as the Vice-Chancellor. He was Dean, School of Agriculture and Agricultural Technology at Federal University of Technology, Owerri (2007–2011). He was Head of Department of Department of Agricultural Economics and Extension and Sixth Substantive Vice-Chancellor, Federal University of Technology, Owerri, Nigeria. Professor Asiabaka was Consultant to Several national and multi-national agencies such Rockefeller Foundation, UNDP, World Bank, Shell Petroleum Development Company, IDRC Canada, DFID Uk and International Institute for Tropical Agriculture. Other services include Senior Scientific Adviser to International Foundations for Science, Sweden and Council for the Development of Social Science Research in Africa (CODESRIA). He is presently the President of Epitome Institute of Education and Innovation, Owerri, Nigeria.
