= Gloria Young =

Nigerian actress (born 1967)

- Born: Gloria Anozie; 4 February 1967 (age 59); Abia State, Nigeria
- Occupation: Actress
- Spouse: Norbert Young
- Children: 3

Gloria Young // (born 4 February 1967) is a Nigerian actress and former journalist. Vanguard described her as "one who ruled the Nigerian movie industry in the 90s".

== Early life and education ==
Young was born in Abia State, Nigeria. She attended Fountain School, Surulere, and Methodist Girls High School, Yaba; both in Lagos State, for her primary and secondary education, respectively. Young obtained her bachelor’s degree in mass communication from the University of Dallas and returned to Nigeria in 1987. She worked as an energy correspondent of the Daily Times before joining Nollywood.

== Career ==
Young began her career as a journalist. In 1994, she debuted as Doris in Glamour Girls. Vanguard described her as "one who ruled the Nigerian movie industry in the 90s". She has also starred in Diiche (2022), produced by James Omokwe.

== Personal life ==
Young married Norbert Young and the couple has three children. During her 50th birthday, a football match was held at the National Stadium in Lagos state to honour her. In March 2025, she opened up about her past struggles with infertility and how she was childless for 7 years.

== Selected filmography ==
- The Soul That Sinneth (1999)
- Back To Life (1997)
- Deadly Affair (1997)
- Millionaires Are Saints (1997)
- The Return (2003)
- The Return (2003)
- Wanted At All Cost (2004)
- Men Do Cry (2005)
- Passionate Appeal (2006)
- The Accursed (2007)
- Behind a Smile (2009)
- Half of a Yellow Sun (2013)
- The Perfect Plan (2014)
- Jewel (2015)
- Idemuza (2017)
- Flee (2018)
- Kpali (2019) (2019)
- Rattlesnake: The Ahanna Story (2020)
- Omugwo (2021) as Mama
- Memoir (2022)
- Glamour Girls (2022)
- Love, Lust & Other Things (2023)
- Muri & Ko (2024)
- Ireti (2024)
- The Weekend (2024)
- Mother of the Bride (2025)

== Awards ==
Year	Award	Category	Result	Ref.
2018	City People Entertainment Awards	Movie Couple of the Year	Won	
2021	Africa Movie Academy Awards	Best Actress in a Supporting Role	Nominated	
