= Celestine Onwuliri =

Nigerian academician

Prof. C.O.E. Onwuliri

Vice Chancellor, Federal University of Technology, Owerri
- In office 2006–2011
- Preceded by: Professor B.A. Nwachukwu
- Succeeded by: Professor C.C. Asiabaka

Ag Vice Chancellor, University of Jos
- In office 2006–2006
- Preceded by: Professor M. Y. Mangvwat
- Succeeded by: Professor Sonni Tyoden

Honorable Commissioner for Information, Culture, Youth and Sports, Imo state
- In office 1997–1999

Honorable Commissioner for Agriculture & Natural Resources
- In office 1998–1998

Personal details
- Born: Celestine Elihe-Onwuliri; 17 February 1952 Mbaise, Imo State
- Died: 3 June 2012 (aged 60) Lagos, Nigeria
- Spouse: Hon. Prof. Viola Adaku Onwuliri (m. 1978)
- Children: 5 (Ijeoma, Kennamdi, ChukwueMeka, Chinemerem, Toochukwu)
- Education: University of Nigeria, Nsukka; University of Leeds

Celestine Onyemobi Elihe Onwuliri (17 February 1952 – 3 June 2012) was a Nigerian academician in the field of Parasitology. He served as the 5th Vice Chancellor of Federal University of Technology Owerri. He was also the Acting Vice Chancellor of the University of Jos.

Onwuliri served in other capacities like a university professor and Honorable Commissioner.

Following his passing, the Graduate Theological Foundation established the Celestine O. E. Onwuliri Fellowship in Scientific Research and Human Values in his honor. The fellowship, based in the United States, reflects his impact on scientific research and the importance he placed on human values.

== Education and early life ==
Celestine Onyemobi Elihe Onwuliri was born in Umuokazi, Amuzi, Ahiazu Mbaise, Imo state, Nigeria. He faced the early loss of both his parents: his father, Adolpus, when he was a toddler, and his mother, Rosanna, during his adolescence.

He completed his primary education at St. Jude's Catholic Primary School, Amuzi, and continued to Community Secondary School, Amuzi. Onwuliri graduated with a division 1 in the West African Senior School Certificate Examination (WASSCE). He pursued higher education at the University of Nigeria, Nsukka (UNN). In 1975, he graduated with a Second Class Upper Honours degree in Zoology.

Onwuliri's academic pursuits led him to further studies, including a Ph.D. in Parasitology (1980) after a year of research training at the University of Leeds, United Kingdom.

== Academic Achievements ==
Celestine Onwuliri's earned University of Nigeria's Foundation AID Scholarship from 1972 to 1975. He was awarded the Vice-Chancellor's prize for the Best Overall Graduating Postgraduate Student in 1980.

His dedication to education and pursuit of excellence extended to his family. One of his sons, Emeka Onwuliri, followed in his footsteps and achieved a First Class in Engineering, becoming the Best Overall Graduating Undergraduate Student at the University of Nigeria in 2004. Another son, Toochukwu Onwuliri, attained a Distinction in Petroleum Engineering at the MSc level from RGU, Aberdeen.

== Personal life and death ==
Celestine Onwuliri was married to Prof. (Mrs.) Viola Onwuliri, and they had five children.

He died in the crash of Dana Air Flight 0992 on 3 June 2012.

== Career and accomplishments ==
Onwuliri moved to University of Jos after his PhD and subsequently garnered over 32 years of teaching, research, administrative and community service experience across six universities culminating in his becoming the Acting Vice Chancellor of the University of Jos and then fifth substantive Vice Chancellor of the FUTO.

Professor Celestine Onwuliri was known in helminthic parasitological research including the ecology and epidemiology of parasitic helminthes which causes many severe communicable diseases such as Dracunculiasis (Guinea worm disease), Onchocerciasis (River blindness), Filariasis, schistomiasis and other intestinal helminthosis. In this research he taught 25 doctor of philosophy (PhD) candidates and more than 160 candidates at MSc. and Bsc. levels in Nigeria and overseas, many of whom became professors, administrators, politicians, and businesspeople. Professor C.O.E. Onwuliri published over 200 articles in peer reviewed journals, and presented several invited papers nationally and internationally. He consequently received and attracted many grants, international linkages and affiliations.

One of Professor Onwuliri's contributions to science is his description of a dichotomous pathway of energy metabolism in the infective stages of parasitic nematodes which confirmed the presence of functional Krebs cycle enzymes in parasitic nematodes (published in Parasitology, 90:169-177[1985]). He was also an editor of many scientific journals including the Nigerian Journal of Parasitology, International Journal of Environment health and human development, Journal of General studies and Nigerian Journal of Natural sciences where he was chairman of the editorial advisory board.

At the University of Jos, he was part of the pioneer team that nurtured to fruition three Postgraduate programmes in the department of Zoology namely – Applied Entomology and Parasitology, Applied Hydrobiology and Fisheries, and Conservation Biology and Ornithological Studies where over 600 scientists have been produced. He held several positions including:

- Head of Department of Zoology
- Dean, Faculty of Natural Sciences, (he was dean three times and in last tenure his Faculty was ranked best Faculty of Science in all Nigerian Universities by the National Universities Commission (CVC News 2003, vol. 3, no. 8, p. 5.) beating the universities of Lagos, Port-harcourt and the Universities of Nigeria to the second, third and fourth positions respectively)
- Sub-Dean, School of Postgraduate Studies
- Deputy Vice-Chancellor (Academic)
- Acting Vice-Chancellor

He also worked outside UNIJOS as the following:

- the Director, Academic Planning, Imo State University Owerri;
- Visiting Professor, Nassarawa State University, Keffi;
- Visiting Professor, Federal University of Technology, Yola;

Prof. Onwuliri served as consultant to several national and international organizations chief among which are:

- Consultant to WHO-TDR National Survey of Onchocerciasis in Kano (1989–1990)
- Consultant to WHO-TDR on Multi-center Rapid assessment study on onchocerciasis in plateau state (1990–1992)
- Consultant on River blindness foundation (RBF)
- Consultant to the Nigerian Guinea Worm Eradication Programme (1988–2008)
- Consultant to the Japanese International Cooperation Agency (JICA) (1984–1994)
- external consultant to the Carter Center/Global 2000 on Lymphatic Filariasis Elimination (1997–2006).

He was appointed by WHO as Advisor on its Community Directed Treatment with Ivermectin (CDTI) project in WHO/African Programme on Onchocerciasis Control (APOC) assisted countries (2003)

He became vice-chancellor, Federal University of Technology Owerri between 2006–2011. Concomitantly, he served as Alternate Chairman of the Committee of Vice-Chancellors (CVC) of Nigerian Universities (June 2010 – February 2011) and briefly as Chairman of CVC (February 2011 – June 2011).

== Public service and contributions ==
During his tenure as Honorable Commissioner for Information, Culture, and Youth in Imo State, Professor Onwuliri played a pivotal role in hosting the 11th National Sports Festival, also known as "IMO 98." This event, held during the years 1998–99, gained recognition as one of the most successful National Sports Festivals in Nigeria's history.

He also served as Honorable Commissioner of Agriculture and Natural Resources, where his contributions aimed at enhancing agricultural development and resource management within the state.

In addition to his governmental roles, Professor Onwuliri held leadership positions in various organizations. He founded and served as President of the University of Nigeria Alumni Association (UNAA) Jos Branch.

In 2005, Professor Onwuliri represented Nigeria as part of the Federal Government's official delegation for the Christian pilgrimage to the holy land, a testament to his recognition and respect on a national level.

== Federal University of Technology, Owerri ==
As Vice Chancellor of the Federal University of Technology, Owerri, Prof. Onwuliri, set in motion a 10 -goal strategic plan aimed at enhancing the integrity of the institution to produce world-class academicians and professionals and also updated the institution with approximately fifty infrastructure projects including faculty buildings, department buildings, the tarring of roads and the provision of staff quarters for lecturers, all before he concluded his tenure, with six of those buildings being commissioned in one day and completed previous abandoned infrastructure projects in FUTO. As VC, he served as Member, Presidential Technical Committee on the Consolidation of Tertiary institutions in Nigeria 2006–2007, Member, Ministerial Committee on the harmonization of ICT in Tertiary Institutions, Member British Council Prime Ministers Initiative strategic dialogue.

At the time of his death, Professor C.O.E. Onwuliri was a visiting professor at the National Universities Commission, Abuja where he was Chairman Standing Committee on Private Universities (SCOPU).

== Knights of St. John International ==
Prof Celestine Onwuliri was the Supreme Subordinate President of the Knights with rank Major General. As the head of the Knights, his 4-point Agenda for Knights, a Blueprint for Peace and Progress in Nigeria formed a backbone and framework for peace and was highlighted by the 4th Memorial Lecture Guest speaker, Brig. Gen. Dr. George Ikioumoton in a speech entitled "Professor Celestine Onwuliri's 4-point Agenda for Knights, a Blueprint for Peace and Progress in Nigeria". He provided leadership and had earlier served as the Knights of St John International Worthy President in Jos and later First Vice President, Supreme Subordinate Commandery Nigeria (2003–2009) before eventually becoming the National Supreme Subordinate President of the Knights.

== Non-profit work ==
A few months before his death, Prof. Celestine Onwuliri registered PROFOUND, a non-profit, non-governmental organisation (NGO) established with the sole purpose of providing succour to the underprivileged in society by enhancing their access to education, healthcare and shelter as well as providing empowerment to individuals and communities in order to fulfil their development potential.

== After his death ==
As a mark of honour, his colleagues at the Imo State University, Owerri on Wednesday, June 20, 2012 wore their full academic regalia, held a valedictory session to bid him farewell and the Vice Chancellor of the University, Prof. Bethram Nwoke (who was Prof. Onwuliri's Phd student), led the session, where his colleagues showered encomiums on him describing him as a great scholar, scientist and an astute administrator par excellence.

On the same day, the Imo State government organised an interdenominational service for Onwuliri and some others from the state who died in the plane crash. Markets in the Owerri metropolis remained closed during the period, while all the state senior civil servants wore black and converged at the Ahiajoku Convention Centre, Owerri, where the state governor, Chief Rochas Okorocha, led the state executive council members for candle light procession, while the speaker, Hon. Benjamin Uwajiogu and others followed in order of sequence with the first Bible reading drawn from the book of Thessalonians 3:18 and was read by the Deputy Governor, Sir Jude Agbaso.

In Onwuliri's honour, the leadership of the Federal University of Technology Owerri (FUTO) Students Union Government (SUG) organised a candle light procession on campus.

His burial was attended by a large number of people including students of Federal University of Technology Owerri, Knights of St. John and also dignitaries like President Goodluck Jonathan represented by the Secretary to the Government of the Federation (SGF) Anyim Pius Anyim, Ministers, Governors including Ikedi Ohakim, Peter Obi, Senators including Hope Uzodinma, Dr. Kema Chikwe, and many Honorable members of the Federal House of Representatives including Hon. Emeka Ihedioha and many other distinguished personalities from the Academia and various fields.

== Posthumous honours ==
Prof. Onwuliri received several posthumous honours including:

- the Graduate Theological Foundation (GTF), USA, Celestine O. E. Onwuliri Fellowship in Scientific Research and Human Values. The GTF is an Educational Institution of higher learning located in Mishawaka, Indiana, USA.
- the 500-capacity ultra-modern library built and dedicated to Prof. C.O.E. Onwuliri in Niger Mixed Secondary, School, Asaba
- the proposed foundation laying ceremony of Prof. Onwuliri Library and computer centre Amuzi;
- commissioning of Prof. Celestine Onwuliri Ultra Modern Biology Laboratory at the Gregory University Uturu, Abia State;
- the Prof. C. O. E. Onwuliri Classroom Block in an Umuahia Seminary
- the Parasitology and Public Health Society of Nigeria (PPSN) book titled “My Society and Prof. C.O.E. Onwuliri" where members recounted their various experiences with Prof. Onwuliri in appreciation of how he touched their lives;
- the inauguration of the “Prof. Celestine O.E. Onwuliri Young Scientist Award" by the Nigerian Parasitology Society, to honour him and achieve his desire of encouraging young scientists;
- the naming of the International Conference building in FUTO after him as the Celestine Onwuliri International Conference Center Federal University of Technology, Owerri;
- the institution of the Prof. C.O.E. Onwuliri Memorial Scholarship Award. by the International Liaison of Mbaise Indigenes ILMI
- the inauguration of the annual Prof. Celestine O. E. Onwuliri Memorial Lecture.

== Onwuliri Memorial Lecture ==
The Prof. Celestine O. E. Onwuliri Memorial lecture has taken place five times so far starting from the 1st year anniversary of his death till date with the 1st one being held at Federal University of Technology Owerri in 2013 and the lecture was titled “Intellectualism in Nigeria's Transformation” was delivered by the Nigerian Minister for Power, Prof. Chinedu Nebo and during which the Governing Council and Senate of the Federal University of Technology, Owerri resolved to rename the FUTO international conference hall after the late Professor Celestine Onwuliri as the “CELESTINE ONWULIRI INTERNATIONAL CONFERENCE CENTRE”; the 2nd Onwuliri Memorial lecture held in 2014 and the guest speaker, Nigeria's Minister of Defence, State, Senator Musiliu Obanikoro, who delivered a lecture titled ‘Security and National Development’ discussing efforts to tackle Boko Haram and other challenges. In 2015, the third Prof. Celestine Onwuliri Memorial lecture held at the Full Moon, Owerri organized by the Professor C.O.E. Onwuliri foundation and the guest speaker, Professor Julius Okojie, Executive Secretary of the National Universities Commission spoke on the Challenges of Nigerian Universities in the 21st Century. The 4th Prof. Onwuliri Memorial Lecture in 2016 was hosted by the Governor of Enugu State, Gov. Ifeanyi Ugwuanyi with Bishop Matthew Hassan Kukah and Brig. Gen. Dr. George Ikioumoton as speaker and the lecture was titled “Professor Celestine Onwuliri’s 4-point Agenda for Knights, a Blueprint for Peace and Progress in Nigeria". Also six Imo Undergraduates being presented with the ILMI-instituted COE Onwuliri Memorial Scholarship Award.

On June 16, 2017, President Goodluck Jonathan, Governor Peter Obi and Dr. Paschal Dozie, the chairman of MTN Nigeria, all participated in the 5th Prof. Celestine Onwuliri Memorial lecture, and the lecture titled: “The problem with Nigeria” was delivered by former Governor Peter Obi while the Obi of Onitsha, Igwe Nnaemeka Achebe was one of the Royal Fathers of the Day and it was followed by the 2017 edition of the Professor COE Onwuliri Annual Memorial Scholarship Award, instituted by the International Liaison of Mbaise Indigenes ILMI in Diaspora and the scholarship award was presented to 6 Imo Undergraduate students. The Onwuliri Memorial Lecture has continued to attract reputable Nigerians, Ministers, Governors, Senators, and many others and has been used to encourage them to support the causes of the PROFOUND foundation to help the poor and indigent

== See also ==
- List of vice chancellors in Nigeria
- Vice Chancellors of Nigerian Universities
- Scholars of Nigeria
- University of Jos
