= Ngozi Ezeonu =

Nigerian actress

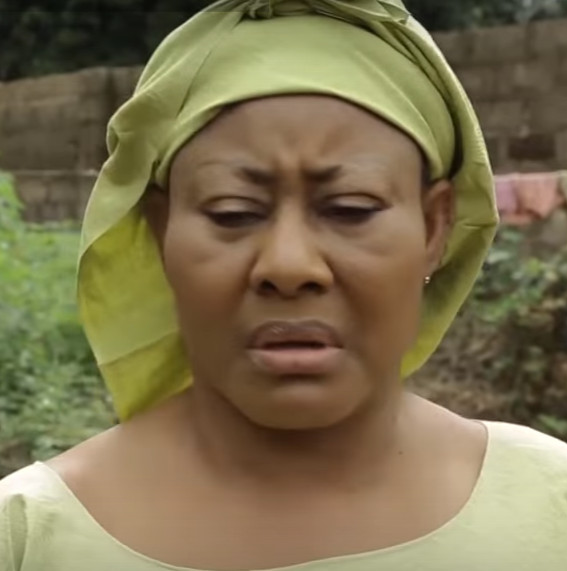
- Ngozi Ezeonu In "Family Secret", 2016
- Born: Ngozi Ikpelue; 1965 May 23rd Imo, Owerri
- Education: Nigerian Institute of Journalism
- Occupation: Actress
- Known for: Reprisal of mother figures
- Awards: 2012, Africa Movie Academy Awards

Ngozi Ezeonu (born Ngozi Ikpelue, May 23, 1965)// is a veteran Nigerian actress and former journalist notable for her portrayal of archetypal matriarchs in Nollywood movies. In 2012, she starred in Adesuwa, a role that earned her the Best Supporting Actress nomination at the 8th Africa Movie Academy Awards

== Early life ==
A native of Ogbunike in Anambra State, Nigeria, Ezeonu was born into a lower-class household in Owerri to Dennis and Ezenwanyi Ikpelue, and has six siblings. She had her primary and secondary education in Owerri, and subsequently studied Journalism at the Nigerian Institute of Journalism before working at Radio Lagos and Eko FM. She also briefly worked as a hairstylist.

== Career ==
Although best known for her maternal roles, Ezeonu was originally cast as younger characters at the start of her acting career. In 1993, veteran film director Zeb Ejiro offered Ezeonu a supporting role as Nkechi, the antagonist's best friend in the Igbo blockbuster Nneka the Pretty Serpent in 1994. This was followed by her role in Glamour Girls the same year as Thelma, a high society mistress. This movie proved that she can be versatile in acting. She has acted in over 200 movies in Nollywood. She has been honored for her efforts towards the growth of Nollywood. She is the Sun Nollywood Icon of the Year for 2023.

== Personal life ==
Ezeonu was previously married to Edwin Ezeonu with whom she had four children - Ogechukwu, Edwina, Chidera, and Melveen. In 2012, she was honored with a Chieftaincy Title Ada Ife (Daughter of Light) by His Royal Highness, C.F.N Ezerioha III, in her hometown of Ihiteoweri, Imo state.

== Filmography ==
She has featured in more than 150 Nollywood films. Among them:

=== 1994 – 2007 ===
- Ada Vigilante
- End of Ada Vigilante
- Evil Project
- Senseless
- Best Honeymoon
- Enslaved
- Definition of Love
- My best friend
- End of a Princess
- Glamour Girls (1994)
- Nneka The Pretty Serpent (1994) as Nkechi
- Mark of the Beast (1999) as Mrs. Modupe
- Wasted Years (2000) as Sarah
- I Swear (2004) as Obidiya
- Occultic Kingdom (2005)
- Abuja Top Ladies (2006) as Winnie
- The Love Doctor (2007) as Kathy
- Royal Grandmother 1 and 2 (2007) as Philomena

=== 2008 – 2016 ===
- Tears in My Eyes (2008)
- Throne of Tears 1, 2 and 3 (2008) as Lolo
- My Darling Princess (2008)
- Tears of a Prince (2009)
- Sister Mary and Ossy (2009)
- Stone Face (2009)
- Secret Shadows 1 and 2 (2010) as Mrs. Okafor
- Wise In-Laws (2010)
- A Private Storm (2010) as Mrs. Jibuno
- Adesuwa (2012)
- Shattered Mirror (2012) as Chief's wife
- August Meeting (2012) as Angela
- The Kings and Gods (2012)
- Broken Engagement (2013)
- Palace War (2014)
- Tears of a Virgin (2014)
- Luscious Lucy (2016)
- Tears of the Innocent (2016)
- Zenith of Sacrifice (2016)
- Heritage (2016)

=== 2017 – 2019 ===
- Tears and Glory (2017)
- Child of Pain (2017)
- Tell Me Why (2017)
- Pretty Little Thing (2017) as Mrs. Ezulike
- Family Secret (2017)
- A Better Family (2018) as Teresa
- Lion Heart (2018) as Chioma Obiagu
- Confessor (2018)
- Dorathy (2018) as Philomena
- Agony of a Sister (2018) as Lolo Dibugo
- Different Worlds (2019) as Queen
- Onye Ndu (2019) as Mama
- Seed of Destruction (2019)
- Dusted Crown (2019)
- Crazy Princess (2019)
- On All Sides (2019)
- Run Away From Love (2019)
- If Trouble Comes (2019)
- Making a King (2019)
- Death Bed (2019)
- Three Brothers (2019)

=== 2020 – 2023 ===
- Nkasi my flesh and blood
- Prince Decision
- A Dance to Forget (2020) as Teresa
- Gone (2021) as Gloria
- Agunnia the Warrior (2021)
- Sign the Will (2021) as Rebecca
- When Love Beckons (2021) as Mama Sochima
- Beautiful (2021) as Mama Iruoma
- Dirty Reflections (2022) as Augustina
- Something Awful (2022) as Bella
- The Dreamers (2022)
- Made in Love (2023) as Mabel

== Awards and nominations ==
Year	Award	Category	Work	Result	Ref
2012	Africa Movie Academy Awards	Best Supporting Actress	Adesuwa	Won	
