= Federal University of Technology Owerri =

Public university in Owerri, Nigeria

- Other name: FUTO
- Motto: Technology For Service
- Type: Public
- Established: 1980
- Vice-Chancellor: Professor Nnenna Oti
- Location: Owerri, Imo State, Nigeria; 5.384°N 6.995°E
- Campus: Urban
- Website: www.futo.edu.ng

The Federal University of Technology Owerri (FUTO) is a federal university in Owerri West, Owerri, the capital of Imo State, Nigeria. The university is bounded by the communities of Eziobodo, Ihiagwa, Obinze, Okolochi and Emeabiam. It is the premier federal university of technology in Nigeria. The university was established in 1980 by Nigeria's first executive president, Shehu Shagari to ensure Nigeria's technological development.

FUTO was established by executive fiat with the composition and appointment of the first provisional council. At the time, the Federal Government of Nigeria sought to establish a university of technology in each geo-political region, particularly in states which did not have a conventional university. FUTO is the first of three such technical universities in Nigeria.

FUTO is an undergraduate and postgraduate institution which enrolled over 8000 students as of February 2026. It offers undergraduate degrees across 58 programs. The school campus is located 25km(15.6 miles) south of Owerri and has a land mass of over 10,000 acres(4,048 ha) making it one of the top 10 largest institutions by landmass in Nigeria.

Like other federal universities in Nigeria, FUTO is headed by a Chancellor who is usually a royal father and followed by a Vice-Chancellor who oversees the daily activities of the university.

The University Senate is the highest decision-making arm of the university. FUTO students are fondly called Futoites and currently there are over 25,000 students. FUTO has over 50 professors. The current vice-chancellor is Professor Nnenna Nnannaya Oti.

== History ==
FUTO began with 225 students and 60 staff (28 academic and 32 non-academic).

The university was founded in 1980. It later merged with Alvan Ikoku College of Education Owerri, absorbing the latter's students.

FUTO is one of the premier technological universities in western Africa. Its student body comprises people from all over west Africa and beyond. It is the only federal university of technology in the south-east of Nigeria, and one of the oldest in West Africa.

FUTO is a partnering institution of the Joint Universities Preliminary Examinations Board (JUPEB). JUPEB offers A/Level programs to students seeking admission into the Federal University of Technology, Owerri via Direct Entry (DE). FUTO admits students into the JUPEB program yearly. On 13 April 2021, Prof Nnenna Oti was elected vice-chancellor to replace Francis Chukwuemeka Eze, whose tenure expired on 19 June 2021.

== Schools ==
- School of Agriculture and Agricultural Technology (SAAT)
- School of Engineering and Engineering Technology (SEET)
- School of Electrical Systems and Engineering Technology (SESET)
- School of Physical Sciences (SOPS)
- School of Biological Sciences (SOBS)
- School of Logistics and Innovation Technology (SLIT)
- School of Health Technology (SOHT)
- School of Environmental Sciences (SOES)
- School of Basic Medical Sciences (SBMS)
- School of Information and Communication Technology (SICT)
- College of Medicine and Health Sciences (CMHS)

== Institutes and Academic Support Centres ==
- Centre for Agricultural Research (CAR)
- Centre for Continuing Education (CCE)
- Centre for Entrepreneurial and Vocational Studies
- Centre for Industrial Studies (CIS)
- Centre for Energy and Power Systems Research (CEPSR)
- Centre for Research and International Development (CRID)
- Centre for Women, Gender and Development Studies
- Information and Communication Technology (ICT) Centre
- Institute of Erosion Studies (IES)
- University Computer Centre (UCC)
- Intellectual Property and Technology Transfer Office (IPTTO)
- Institute of Environmental Health and Environmental Justice (IEHEJ)

=== University Library ===
The University Library serves as the pivot of academic pursuit. It was opened to students at the Lake Nwaebere campus on 9 November 1981. The pioneer librarian was Joseph Chike Anafulu. The library has three main blocks: Library Phases II & IV and the E-library.

== Teaching hospital ==
In 2023, the Federal Medical Centre Owerri was officially upgraded and renamed the Federal University Teaching Hospital, Owerri (FUTHO) to serve as the primary teaching hospital for FUTO's College of Medicine. The upgrade was part of a federal initiative to expand access to medical education and improve healthcare services in southeastern Nigeria.

== List of programmes/courses ==
School of Agriculture And Agricultural Technology (SAAT)

- Agricultural Economics
- Agricultural Extension
- Animal Science and Technology
- Crop Science and Technology
- Fisheries and Aquaculture Technology
- Forestry and Wildlife Technology
- Soil Science and Technology

School of Health Technology (SOHT)

- Dental Technology
- Environmental Health Science
- Optometry
- Prosthetics and Orthotics
- Public Health Technology

School of Basic Medical Science (SBMS)

- School of Basic Medical Science

School of Information and Communication Technology (SICT)

- Computer Science
- Cyber Security
- Information Technology
- Software Engineering

School of Biological Science (SOBS)

- Biochemistry
- Biology
- Biotechnology
- Microbiology
- Forensic Science

School of Management Technology (SMAT)

- Financial Management Technology
- Management Technology
- Maritime Management Technology
- Project Management Technology
- Transport Management Technology

School of Engineering and Engineering Technology (SEET)

- Agricultural and Bio resources Engineering
- Biomedical Engineering
- Chemical Engineering
- Civil Engineering
- Electrical and Electronics Engineering
- Food Science and technology
- Material and Metallurgical Engineering
- Mechanical Engineering
- Mechatronic Engineering
- Petroleum Engineering
- Polymer and Textile Engineering

School of Physical Science (SOPS)

- Chemistry
- Geology
- Mathematics
- Physics
- Science Laboratory Technology
- Statistics

School of Electrical Systems Engineering Technology (SESET)

- School of Electrical Systems Engineering Technology (SESET)

School of Environmental Science (SOES)

- Architecture
- Building Technology
- Environmental Technology
- Quantity Surveying
- Surveying and Geoinformatics
- Urban and Regional Planning

School of Postgraduate Studies (SPGS)

- PG School

Directorate of General Studies

- General Studies

== Inaugural lectures ==
The following inaugural lectures have been presented in the university:

Past inaugural lectures of FUTO
Lecturer	Topic	Date
C.O.G. Obah	Communication in the service of a Nation	Dec 17, 1986
E.O.I Banigo	Food Processing and Preservation, Paths to self Sufficiency	January 18, 1989
V.O Nwoko	Where Rust Doth Corrupt	Nov. 14, 1990
S.C.O Ugbolue	In the thrones of Polymer and Textiles	
O.O Onyemobi	Mineral Resources Exploitation, Processing and Utilization : A Sine Qua Nun for Nigeria's Industrial Development	July 17, 2002
A.B.I Udedibie	In Search of Food: FUTO and the Nutritional Challenge of Canavalia Seeds	Sept. 18, 2003
E.O.N Okorafor	Expendable Polystyrene Pattern Casting Process: A revolution in metal casting	March 17, 2004
P.B.U Achi	Acquisition of Indigenous Machinery Design Manufacturing: The Engineering Education and Training Perspective	June 28, 2004
M.I Nwufor	Securing the Harvest to ensure food for all : A Plant pathologist's Perspective	
Iloeje, M. U.	The Chicken or the Egg: Nature and Nurture: New Genetic Spreadsheets and Gene Pools in the Breeding and Evolution of a New Nigeria-Man	Nov. 17, 2004
Uzuegbu, J. O.	Salvaging Our Food from Fungal Rot, to Ensure Food Security	Oct. 29, 2008
C.S Nwadiaro	Inland water Data base as a Sine Qua Non for Fisheries Development in Nigeria	March 7, 2009
M.C Ofoh	Food Security and Mitigation of Climate change through ecosystem based agriculture	May 27, 2009
Okoro, C. C.	Universities as Effective Centres for Science and Technology Development	Feb. 29, 2009
Anyanwu, B. N.	Instilling Moral Ethnics in the University Community: A Sine Qua Non for National Growth and Development	June 10, 2010
Onuoha, Goddy N.	The Chemical Pathway: Small Changes that made a Difference	March 27, 2013
Eze, Christopher C	Agricultural Finance: a Panacea for Agricultural and Rural Development (24th Inaugural Lecture)	March 26, 2014
Agwu, Amadi N	Environmental Health and Sanitation as Panacea to Disease Control and Prevention	July 23, 2014
Onyeka, Eucheria U	Food Security: Concerns and Comforts in Food Processing	April 27, 2016
Asoegwu, S. N.	Leveraging Food Security Challenges in Nigeria:Through Agricultural Production, Processing and Storage for Mitigating Economic Recession	Oct, 24, 2018
Dozie, I. N. S.	Microorangisms, Microbial Products and Chronic Disabling Diseases of Humans: New Insights	June 26, 2019
Oti, N. N.	Man and His Environment: A Soil Scientist's Search for Answers	Sept 18, 2019

== Vice-chancellors ==
- Prof. U.D. Gomwalk (1980–1986)
- Prof. Amah Nduka (1986–1991)
- Prof.C. O.G. Oba (1992–1999)
- Prof. Jude Njoku (2000–2005)
- Prof. C.E.O. Onwuliri (2006–2011)
- Prof. Chigozie C. Asiabaka (2011–2016)
- Prof. Francis Chukwuemeka Eze (2016–2021)
- Prof. Nnenna Oti (2021–2026)
- Prof. I.N.S Dozie (2026 - Present)

== Deputy vice chancellors from 1993 ==
Deputy vice chancellor	Post	Year
Prof. J.O. Duru	Deputy vice chancellor (academic)	1993-1997
Prof. S.C.O Ugbolue	Deputy vice chancellor (administration)	1993-1997
Prof. M.U. Iloeje	DVC (academic)	1997-2001
Prof. Jude E. Njoku	DVC (adm)	1997-2001
Prof. A.B.I. Udedibie	DVC (acad)	2001-2005
Prof. I.C. Ogwude	DVC (adm)	2001-2005
Prof. Ebong T. Eshett	DVC (acad)	2006-2010
Prof. Martin I. Nwufo	DVC (adm)	2006-2010
Engr. Prof. O.N. Oguoma	DVC (acad)	2010-2011
Prof. G.I. Nwankwor	DVC (adm)	2010-2011
Prof. (Mrs.) Rose N. Nwabueze	DVC (adm)	July 2011- Sept 2013
Prof. B.N. Onwuagba	DVC (acad)	2011-2015
Prof. F.C. Eze	DVC (adm)	Sept. 13, 2013 - June 18, 2016
Prof. Okoro Ogbobe	DVC (acad)	Sept. 7, 2015-Dec. 15, 2017
Prof. Israel C. Ndukwe	DVC (adm)	July 19, 2016- July 18, 2018
Prof. Ndukwe J. Okeudo	DVC (acad)	2018-2020
Prof J.S. Orebiyi	DVC (adm)	2018 to date
Prof. Bede C. Anusionwu	DVC (Research, Development & Innovation)	2018 to date
Prof. Nnenna Oti	DVC (acad)	2020 to date

== Partnership ==
In June 2025, the Federal University of Technology Owerri received a donation of digital switches and access points from Interswitch and Cisco. This was part of a joint initiative by the companies to boost digital infrastructure across five Nigerian tertiary institutions, aimed at enhancing the university's network and IT programs.

== Nigerian universities ranking ==
The National Universities Commission (NUC), the body responsible for universities in Nigeria, has not done an official ranking of Nigerian universities in over 14 years.

However, FUTO is currently ranked the 24th best university in Nigeria, according to unirank.org.

== Notable alumni ==
- Smart Adeyemi – politician
- Ndubuisi Ekekwe – professor
- Paul Obiefule – football player
- Nnenna Oti – vice-chancellor of FUTO

== See also ==
- List of universities in Nigeria
- Education in Nigeria
