= Umuanigo =

Umuanigo is a kindred in Owellemba Village in Umana Ndiuno, which is in Ezeagu LGA of Enugu State in eastern Nigeria. Umuanigo has five major families: Umu-Ndida, Umu-Eze, Umu-Aboshi, Umu-Ngwu and Umu-Ani. These families are believed to be the descendants of a man who has five sons and went on to have their own families. These five major families are known as Umuanigo. Today, people from Umuanigo still keep trace of their roots and each individual knows which of the 5 families they belong to.

== History ==
The use of the word "Umu", which means "children of" in English, make it possible for one from Umuanigo to be able to trace one's family lineage.

The modern Umu-Ani have 5 families these are Aniakor, Mgbachi, Nweke, Ozoaham and Ozoanikwe. These five families expanded to 11 families and are still expanding. The same pattern of family expansion in Umu-Ani also took place in Umu-Ndida, Umu-Eze, Umu-Aboshi and Umu-Ngwu, making Umuanigo one big family that has different races and tribes being married into the family. Today, the new generation of Umuanigo has children born of mix culture, nationality and race.

The people of Umuanigo still recognize the fact that they are one big family; their internal problems are resolved within the family. They do not marry each other as they consider themselves as brothers and sisters.
