= Emii, Imo State =

Towns in Imo State, Nigeria

Coordinates: 5°27′N 7°06′E

The Ancient Emii was an autonomous community in Imo State in south eastern Nigeria having the postal code 460111. It is near the city of Owerri.
