= Umuofa =

Village in Imo state, Nigeria

Coordinates: 5.516°N 7.114°E

Umuofa is a village in Imo State, southeastern Nigeria. It is located near the city of Owerri.
