= Umunahu =

Village in Imo state, Nigeria

Umunahu is a village in southeastern Nigeria located near the city of Owerri.
