= 2023 Imo State gubernatorial election =

2023 gubernatorial election in Imo State, Nigeria

- 11 November 2023
Nominee	Hope Uzodinma	Samuel Anyanwu	Athan Achonu
Party	APC	PDP	LP
Running mate	Chinyere Ekomaru	Jones Onyereri	Tony Nwulu
Popular vote	540,308	71,503	64,081
- LGA results APC: 40–50% 50–60% 60–70% 70–80% 80–90% >90%
Governor before election
Hope Uzodinma
APC
Elected Governor
Hope Uzodinma
APC

The 2023 Imo State gubernatorial election was held on 11 November 2023 due to the belated inauguration of incumbent Governor Hope Uzodinma, (Note: Emeka Ihedioha of the PDP was originally elected Governor; however, a Supreme Court judgement in January 2020 awarded the win to the APC's Hope Uzodinma after Ihedioha had governed for over seven months.) to elect the Governor of Imo State. Incumbent APC Governor Hope Uzodinma was re-elected, with him winning all the 27 local government areas. LP candidate Athan Achonu has filed a lawsuit against Uzodinma claiming that the election was "marred by irregularities, including vote buying and physical assaults of LP agents, and thus deserving of outright cancellation".

== Electoral system ==
The Governor of Imo State is elected using a modified two-round system. To be elected in the first round, a candidate must receive the plurality of the vote and over 25% of the vote in at least two-thirds of state local government areas. If no candidate passes this threshold, a second round will be held between the top candidate and the next candidate to have received a plurality of votes in the highest number of local government areas.

== Primary elections ==
The primaries, along with any potential challenges to primary results, will take place between 27 March and 17 April 2022.

=== All Progressives Congress ===
In February 2022, the national APC announced its gubernatorial primaries' schedule, setting its expression of interest form price at ₦10 million and nomination form price at ₦40 million with a 50% nomination form discount for candidates younger than 40 while women and candidates with disabilities get free nomination forms. Both primary forms were sold from 14 to 22 February 2023. The form submission deadline was set for 22 February while candidates would be screened between 24 and 26 February. Ward congresses were set for 8 April in Bayelsa and Imo states to elect delegates for the primary while the Kogi congresses had been held on 8 February. Candidates approved by the screening process advanced to a primary set for 10 April, in concurrence with the other APC gubernatorial primaries; challenges to the result could be made on 12 April.

==== Cleared by screening committee ====
- Hope Uzodinma: Governor and former Senator for Imo West

==== Declined ====
- Ifeanyi Ararume: former Senator for Imo North
- Jude Ejiogu: former Secretary to Imo State Government and 2019 APC gubernatorial candidate
- David Mbamara: entrepreneur
- Chukwuemeka Nwajiuba: former Minister of State for Education (2019–2022) and former House of Representatives member for Ehime Mbano/Ihitte Uboma/Obowo
- Uche Nwosu: 2019 APC gubernatorial candidate and AA gubernatorial nominee, Governor Okorocha administration official, and son-in-law of former Governor Okorocha

=== Labour Party ===
==== Purchased forms ====
- Athan Achonu: former Senator for Imo North
- Martin Agbaso: former Senator for Imo East
- Charles Agomuo
- Chinedu Amadi: businessman
- Humphrey Anumudu†: businessman
- Tochi Ehirim
- Ike Ibe: former House of Assembly member for Obowo West and former Speaker of the House of Assembly
- C. Ishiguzo
- Basil Maduka: businessman
- David Mbamara
- Kelechi Nwagwu: former House of Assembly member and former Speaker of the House of Assembly
- Lincoln Ogunewe: former Army major general
- Joseph Ukaegbu

=== People's Democratic Party ===
In late 2022 and early 2023, reporting revealed an intense internal battle within the Imo PDP over the gubernatorial ticket between the state party's two most influential figures: former Senator Samuel Anyanwu and former Governor Emeka Ihedioha. Anyanwu and Ihedioha had competed for the 2019 nomination and struggled for control of the state party during the 2022 legislative primaries. In January 2023, observers noted PDP concern that the Anyanwu-Ihedioha feud could hurt the party ahead of elections in both February and October.

On 1 December 2022, the national PDP announced its gubernatorial primaries' schedule. Both primary forms—the expression of interest and nomination forms—were sold from 16 to 31 January 2023, aside from Kogi State where the deadline was later extended to 13 February. Similarly, all form submission deadlines were pushed back from 13 February to 1 March. Ward congresses were set for 28-29 March and LGA congresses were rescheduled for 8 April to elect delegates for the primary. Candidates approved by the screening process advanced to a primary set for 14-15 May, in concurrence with all other PDP gubernatorial primaries; challenges to the result could be made in the following days.

==== Cleared by screening committee ====
- Samuel Anyanwu: PDP National Secretary, former Senator for Imo East, and 2019 PDP gubernatorial candidate

==== Withdrew ====
- Emeka Ihedioha: former Governor and former House of Representatives member for Aboh Mbaise/Ngor Okpala

==== Declined ====
- Jerry Alagbaoso: House of Representatives member for Oru East/Orsu/Orlu

== Conduct ==
=== Electoral timetable ===
On 25 October 2022, the Independent National Electoral Commission released the timetable, setting out key dates and deadlines for the election.

- 14 November 2022 – Publication of Notice of Election
- 27 March 2023 – First day for the conduct of party primaries
- 17 April 2023 – Final day for the conduct of party primaries, including the resolution of disputes arising from them
- 24 April 2023 – First day for submission of nomination forms to INEC via the online portal
- 5 May 2023 – Final day for submission of nomination forms to INEC via the online portal
- 9 June 2023 – Publication of final nominee list
- 14 June 2023 – Commencement of the official campaign period
- 9 November 2023 – Final day of the official campaign period

== General election ==
=== Results ===
2023 Imo State gubernatorial election
Party	Candidate	Votes	%
A			
AA			
ADP			
APP			
AAC			
ADC			
APM			
APC			
APGA			
BP			
LP			
New Nigeria Peoples Party			
NRM			
PDP			
PRP			
SDP			
YPP			
ZLP			
Total votes			100.00%
Turnout			

==== By senatorial district ====
The results of the election by senatorial district.

Senatorial District	TBD APC		TBD APGA		TBD PDP		Others		Total Valid Votes
Senatorial District	Votes	Percentage	Votes	Percentage	Votes	Percentage	Votes	Percentage	Total Valid Votes
Imo East Senatorial District (Note: Comprising the local government areas of Aboh Mbaise, Ahiazu Mbaise, Ezinihitte Mbaise, Ikeduru, Mbaitoli, Ngor Okpala, Owerri Municipal, and Owerri West.) (Owerri Zone)	TBD	%	TBD	%	TBD	%	TBD	%	TBD
Imo North Senatorial District (Note: Comprising the local government areas of Ehime Mbano, Ihitte/Uboma, Isiala Mbano, Obowo, Okigwe, and Onuimo.) (Okigwe Zone)	TBD	%	TBD	%	TBD	%	TBD	%	TBD
Imo West Senatorial District (Note: Comprising the local government areas of Ideato North, Ideato South, Isu, Njaba, Nwangele, Nkwerre, Oguta, Ohaji/Egbema, Orlu, Orsu, Oru East, and Oru West.) (Orlu Zone)	TBD	%	TBD	%	TBD	%	TBD	%	TBD
Totals	TBD	%	TBD	%	TBD	%	TBD	%	TBD

==== By federal constituency ====
The results of the election by federal constituency.

Federal Constituency	TBD APC		TBD APGA		TBD PDP		Others		Total Valid Votes
Federal Constituency	Votes	Percentage	Votes	Percentage	Votes	Percentage	Votes	Percentage	Total Valid Votes
Aboh Mbaise/Ngor Okpala Federal Constituency (Note: Comprising the local government areas of Aboh Mbaise and Ngor Okpala.)	TBD	%	TBD	%	TBD	%	TBD	%	TBD
Ahiazu Mbaise/Ezinihitte Federal Constituency (Note: Comprising the local government areas of Ahiazu Mbaise and Ezinihitte Mbaise.)	TBD	%	TBD	%	TBD	%	TBD	%	TBD
Ehime Mbano/Ihitte Uboma/Obowo Federal Constituency (Note: Comprising the local government areas of Ehime Mbano, Ihitte/Uboma, and Obowo.)	TBD	%	TBD	%	TBD	%	TBD	%	TBD
Ideato North/Ideato South Federal Constituency (Note: Comprising the local government areas of Ideato North and Ideato South.)	TBD	%	TBD	%	TBD	%	TBD	%	TBD
Ikeduru/Mbaitoli Federal Constituency (Note: Comprising the local government areas of Ikeduru and Mbaitoli.)	TBD	%	TBD	%	TBD	%	TBD	%	TBD
Isiala Mbano/Okigwe/Onuimo Federal Constituency (Note: Comprising the local government areas of Isiala Mbano, Okigwe, and Onuimo.)	TBD	%	TBD	%	TBD	%	TBD	%	TBD
Isu/Njaba/Nkwerre/Nwangele Federal Constituency (Note: Comprising the local government areas of Isu, Njaba, Nkwerre, and Nwangele.)	TBD	%	TBD	%	TBD	%	TBD	%	TBD
Oguta/Ohaji/Egbema/Oru West Federal Constituency (Note: Comprising the local government areas of Oguta, Ohaji/Egbema, and Oru West.)	TBD	%	TBD	%	TBD	%	TBD	%	TBD
Oru East/Orsu/Orlu Federal Constituency (Note: Comprising the local government areas of Orlu, Orsu, and Oru East.)	TBD	%	TBD	%	TBD	%	TBD	%	TBD
Owerri Municipal/Owerri North/Owerri West Federal Constituency (Note: Comprising the local government areas of Owerri Municipal, Owerri North, and Owerri West.)	TBD	%	TBD	%	TBD	%	TBD	%	TBD
Totals	TBD	%	TBD	%	TBD	%	TBD	%	TBD

==== By local government area ====
The results of the election by local government area.

LGA	TBD APC		TBD APGA		TBD PDP		Others		Total Valid Votes	Turnout Percentage
LGA	Votes	Percentage	Votes	Percentage	Votes	Percentage	Votes	Percentage	Total Valid Votes	Turnout Percentage
Aboh Mbaise	TBD	%	TBD	%	TBD	%	TBD	%	TBD	%
Ahiazu Mbaise	TBD	%	TBD	%	TBD	%	TBD	%	TBD	%
Ehime Mbano	TBD	%	TBD	%	TBD	%	TBD	%	TBD	%
Ezinihitte Mbaise	TBD	%	TBD	%	TBD	%	TBD	%	TBD	%
Ideato North	TBD	%	TBD	%	TBD	%	TBD	%	TBD	%
Ideato South	TBD	%	TBD	%	TBD	%	TBD	%	TBD	%
Ihitte/Uboma	TBD	%	TBD	%	TBD	%	TBD	%	TBD	%
Ikeduru	TBD	%	TBD	%	TBD	%	TBD	%	TBD	%
Isiala Mbano	TBD	%	TBD	%	TBD	%	TBD	%	TBD	%
Isu	TBD	%	TBD	%	TBD	%	TBD	%	TBD	%
Mbaitoli	TBD	%	TBD	%	TBD	%	TBD	%	TBD	%
Ngor Okpala	TBD	%	TBD	%	TBD	%	TBD	%	TBD	%
Njaba	8110	69.4%	51	0.004%	2404	0.2%	1120	0.1%	11685	100%
Nkwerre	TBD	%	TBD	%	TBD	%	TBD	%	TBD	%
Nwangele	TBD	%	TBD	%	TBD	%	TBD	%	32551	100%
Obowo	17514	81%	0	0%	711	0.03%	3404	0.16%	21629	100%
Oguta	TBD	%	TBD	%	TBD	%	TBD	%	TBD	%
Ohaji/Egbema	TBD	%	TBD	%	TBD	%	TBD	%	TBD	%
Okigwe	TBD	%	TBD	%	TBD	%	TBD	%	TBD	%
Onuimo	TBD	%	TBD	%	TBD	%	TBD	%	TBD	%
Orlu	TBD	%	TBD	%	TBD	%	TBD	%	TBD	%
Orsu	18003	91.9%	59	0.003%	624	0.03%	902	0.046%	19588	100%
Oru East	TBD	%	TBD	%	TBD	%	TBD	%	TBD	%
Oru West	38206	91.1%	1867	0.044%	987	0.02%	857	0.02%	41737	100%
Owerri Municipal	5324	49.6%	275	0.026%	2180	20.2%	3165	29.4%	10741	100%
Owerri North	TBD	%	TBD	%	TBD	%	TBD	%	TBD	%
Owerri West	TBD	%	TBD	%	TBD	%	TBD	%	TBD	%
Totals	TBD	%	TBD	%	TBD	%	TBD	%	TBD	%
