= 2019 Imo State gubernatorial election =

2019 gubernatorial election in Imo State, Nigeria

- (Nigeria)
- 9 March 2019
- Turnout: ~~33.28%~~
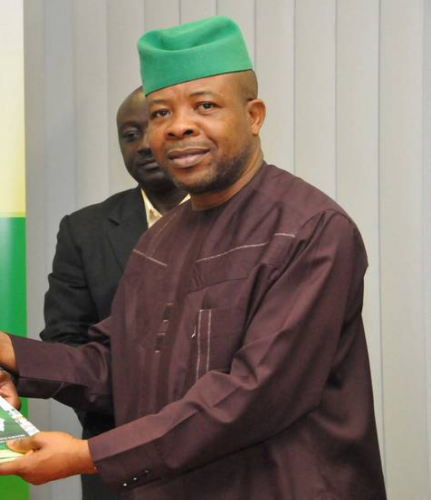

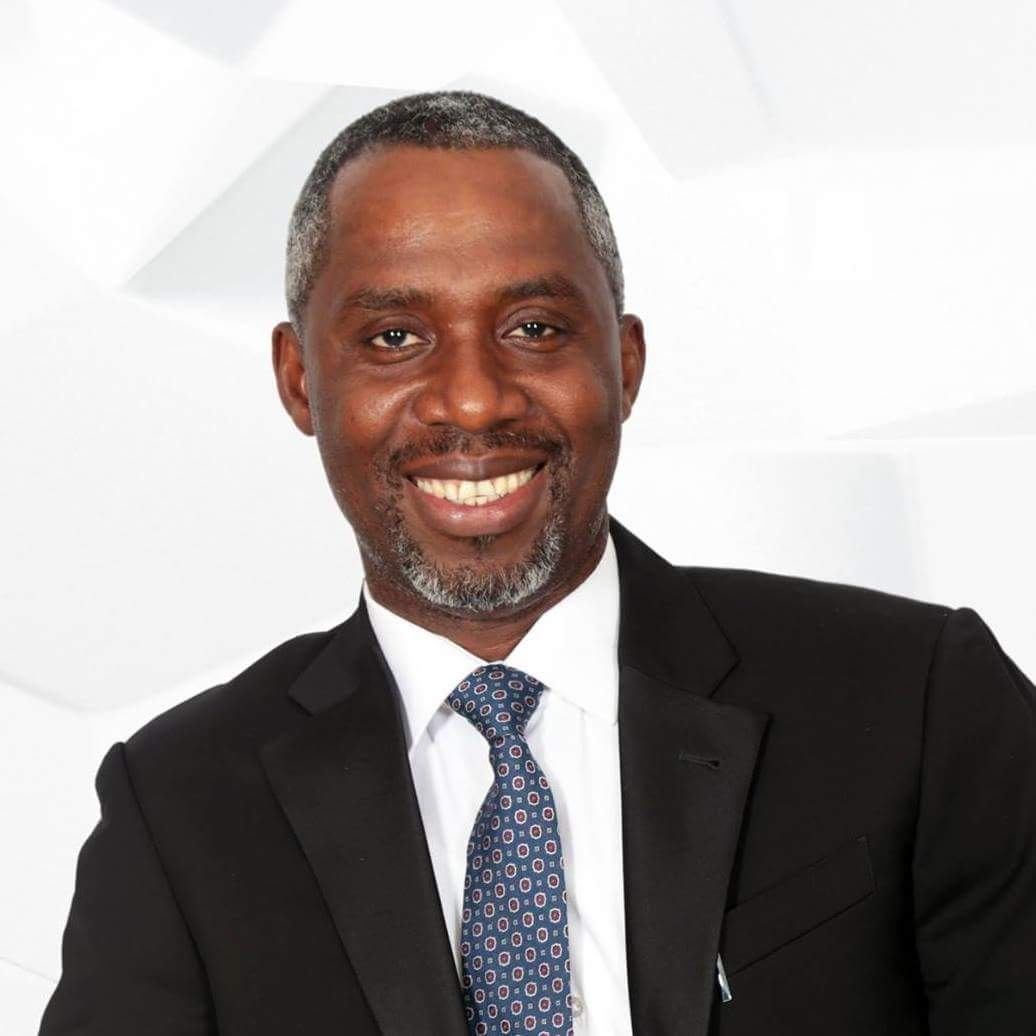
Nominee	~~Emeka Ihedioha~~	~~Uche Nwosu~~
Party	~~People's Democratic Party~~	~~Action Alliance~~
Running mate	~~Gerald Iroha~~	~~Ihim~~
Popular vote	~~273,404~~	~~190,364~~
Percentage	~~38.29%~~	~~26.66%~~
Governor before election
Rochas Okorocha
APC
Elected Governor
~~Emeka Ihedioha~~
PDP

The 2019 Imo State gubernatorial election in Nigeria was held on 9th March 2019. The candidate of the People`s Democratic Party (PDP), Emeka Ihedioha who was declared winner by the Independent Electoral Commission (INEC), had his victory upturned by the decision of the Supreme court after 230 in office, and Hope Uzodimma of the All Progressive Congress (APC) was subsequently sworn in as governor of Imo State.

PDP's Emeka Ihedioha polled 38.29% of the total votes, defeating AA's Uche Nwosu who got 26.66% of popular votes, and several minor party candidates. Out of 27 LGAs, Ihedioha won in 11, while Nwosu won in 10.

Ihedioha whose running mate was Gerard Iroha,emerged winner at the gubernatorial primary after defeating Samuel Anyanwu.

Of the 70 candidates who aspired for the governorship seat, 66 were male, four were female.

Ten months later, on 14 January 2020, the Supreme Court of Nigeria reached a unanimous decision that the election results had been tampered with by the fact that the hundreds of thousands of votes, from a shocking 388 polling stations, had not been included; the Court immediately voided Ihedioha's supposed election and confirmed that Hope Uzodinma of the All Progressives Congress party – originally shown in fourth place – was the top vote-getter and true Governor of IMO State. Uzodinma And his running mate, Placid Njoku, were sworn in the next day as Governor and Deputy Governor of Imo State, respectively.

== Electoral system ==
The Governor of Imo State is elected using the plurality voting system.

== Primary election ==
=== PDP primary ===
The PDP primary election earlier scheduled for 30 September 2018 began by 4:00 pm on Monday 1 October and ended about 4:30 am Tuesday 2 October 2018, held at the Kanu Nwankwo Sports Centre, Owerri. Over 3,000 delegates were present from the 27 LGAs of the state. Former Deputy Speaker, House of Representatives, Emeka Ihedioha emerged winner with 1,723 delegate votes defeating closest rival, Samuel Anyanwu, Senator representing Imo East with 1,282 votes. The exercise was declared to be peaceful by the chairman gubernatorial primaries committee in Imo State, Emma Nwala, with jubilation in the air due to the election's conduct (although the delegates election was said to have been marked with irregularities). However, Anyanwu was said to have rejected the result and called for the cancellation and rerun of same. The only female contestant was also reported to have taken legal action against the winner. Other contestants include Athan Achonu who polled 63 votes, Prof. Jude Njoku 21 votes, Chukwuma Ekomaru (SAN) 7 votes and Chukwuemeka Ezeji 1 vote.

=== Candidates ===
- Party nominee: Emeka Ihedioha: Incumbent governor.
- Running mate: Gerald Irona.
- Samuel Anyanwu
- Athan Achonu
- Prof. Jude Njoku
- Chukwuma Ekomaru (SAN)
- Chukwuemeka Ezeji
- Irene Ottih

=== APC primary ===
The APC primary elections in Imo State was as reported, "unsettling the party". This could be traced back to few weeks before the election. It was held from 30 September to 1 October 2018 "amidst confusion". Two of the ten contestants, Uche Nwosu and Hope Uzodinma, were declared winners, consecutively, leading to a state of confusion.

Uzodinma was declared winner by the Chairman of Imo State governorship primary electoral committee, Ahmed Gulak, and said to have polled 423,895 votes, Prince Eze Madumere 128,325 votes, Ugwumba Uche Nwosu 10,329 votes, Sir George Eche 16,597 votes, Engr. Chuks Ololo 13,645 votes, Sir Jude Ejiogu 12,369 votes, Peter Gbujie 12,329 votes, Barr. Chima Anozie 11,071 votes, and Chris Nlemoha 9,253 votes. Nine of the 12 committee members, however, were said to have "disowned" him and declared Uche Nwosu winner. At the party's Secretariat in Owerri, nevertheless, the result, as announced by the committee secretary, Hon. Henry Idahagbon, had Uche Nwosu polling 455,655 votes, Air Commodore Peter Gbujie (rtd) 9,351 votes. The APC governorship primaries in Imo State was thereupon suspended from the party's national headquarters, with no reason given.

Vanguard Nigeria reported the electoral committee chairman, Ibrahim Agbabiaka, announcing Uche Nwosu, the former Chief of Staff to Imo state governor Rochas Okorocha, as winner of the 2018 governorship primary in which he contested alongside nine others, at about 3:20 AM, having said to have polled 269,524 votes, Chuks Ololo 6,428 votes, Peter Gbujie 4,855 votes, Eze Madumere 2,646 votes, Jude Ejiogu 3,456 votes, Chima Anozie 3,248 votes, George Eche 2,454 votes, and Chris Nlemoha 925 votes. The results were not, however, accepted by a coalition of aspirants called the Imo Allied forces, headed by Senator Hope Uzodinma and Eze Madumere, who claimed they were excluded from the process, even though the electoral chairman said, as he announced the results that all nine governorship aspirants were part of the process. Gulak, who earlier announced Nwosu won later returned to support the results announced by Agbaziaka.

The aggrieved party confessed to going to court to "stop" the primaries. Five of the aspirants later in October 2018 gave support to Uzodinma as being the winner, alongside a court ruling which went in his favor.

Uche Nwosu later in December 2018 dumped APC and went ahead to become AA's gubernatorial candidate for the state, but not without having to contend in a legal battle with Myke Ikoku, the party's earlier nominee for the race, and other issues. Rt. Hon. Acho Ihim, Speaker of the House of Assembly of Imo State, who led a mass deflection alongside 17 others into the party, became his running mate.

=== Candidates ===
- Party nominee: Hope Uzodinma.
- Running mate: .
- Uche Nwosu (Deflected)
- Chuks Ololo
- Peter Gbujie
- Eze Madumere
- Jude Ejiogu
- Chima Anozie
- George Eche
- Chris Nlemoha

== Results ==
A total of 70 candidates registered with the Independent National Electoral Commission to contest in the election. PDP ex-lawmaker governorship aspirant, Senator Emeka Ihedioha, won election for a first term polling 273,404 votes, defeating AA's Uche Nwosu who came second with 190,364 votes, Ifeanyi Araraume of APGA third with 114,676 votes, Hope Uzodinma of APC fourth with 96,458 votes, and several minority party candidates. The AA candidate's candidature was later invalidated by a court, for violating the section 37 of the Electoral Act 2010 (as amended) by obtaining nomination from two parties, APC and AA. Likewise, the APC was said to have no candidate for the election, hence, the PDP candidate's victory.

The total number of registered voters in the state was 2,221,008 while 823,743 voters were accredited. Total number of votes cast was 739,485, while total number of valid votes was 714,355. Total rejected votes were 25,130.

Candidate	Party	Votes	%
Emeka Ihedioha	People's Democratic Party (PDP)	273,404	38.29
Uche Nwosu	Action Alliance (AA)	190,364	26.66
Ifeanyi Godwin Araraume	All Progressives Grand Alliance (APGA)	114,676	16.06
Hope Odidika Uzodinma	All Progressives Congress (APC)	96,458	13.51
Ikedi Godson Ohakim	Accord (A)	6,846	0.96
Humphrey Anumudu	Zenith Labour Party (ZLP)	3,999	0.56
Nwosu Brady Chijioke	Advanced Peoples Democratic Alliance (APDA)	2,491	0.35
Okechukwu Theodore Ezeh	Social Democratic Party (SDP)	2,253	0.32
Nnaemeka Lawrence Nwankwo	Progressive Peoples Alliance (PPA)	1,979	0.28
Ukaegbu Joseph Ikechukwu	Labour Party (LP)	1,658	0.23
Aguocha Chidiebere	Advanced Allied Party (AAP)	1,657	0.23
Omeogu-Ogbuta Chidiebere	African Action Congress (AAC)	1,628	0.23
Nwulu-Onyeulo Anthony Chinedu	United Progressive Party (UPP)	1,466	0.21
Okonya Edward Chukwuka	All Grand Alliance Party (AGAP)	1,345	0.19
Agwu Justin Ifeanyi	People for Democratic Change (PDC)	1,064	0.15
Ekwerike Alphonsus I. N.	Abundant Nigeria Renewal Party (ANRP)	981	0.14
Nwadigo Chris C.	People's Party of Nigeria (PPN)	919	0.13
Ibe Kyrian Uchenna	Democratic People's Congress (DPC)	798	0.11
Daniel Nwabueze Osuegbu	Peoples Coalition Party (PCP)	762	0.11
Chukwu Ejike Lucky	African Democratic Congress (ADC)	738	0.10
Edoziem Clinton Chibuike	Allied Peoples Movement (APM)	688	0.10
Anuchauka Godswill Ikemefula	National Rescue Movement (NRM)	673	0.09
Osuji Aloysius Osondu	Mass Action Joint Alliance (MAJA)	570	0.08
Okorie Linus Chinedu	Young Progressive Party (YPP)	527	0.07
Obioma Success Akagburuonye	Action Democratic Party (ADP)	413	0.06
Ofoegbu Godwin Chidi	Privodence People's Congress (PPC)	335	0.05
Olehi Ngozi Chido	All Grassroots Alliance (AGA)	318	0.04
Ibe Mercy Adaku	Democratic People's Party (DPP)	271	0.04
Francis Beluchukwu	National Unity Party (NUP)	269	0.04
Francis Chike Ugorji	Restoration Party of Nigeria (RP)	255	0.04
Oparaocha Bruno Chidiebere	Action People's Party (APP)	244	0.03
Tony Onyerugbulem	Freedom and Justice Party (FJP)	243	0.03
Stephen N. Ohiri	Allied Congress Party of Nigeria (ACPN)	242	0.03
Uwakwe Elvis	National Conscience Party (NCP)	221	0.03
Friday Odinaka Emereonwu	Advanced Congress of Democrats (ACD)	204	0.03
Nwaiwu Henry Chinemere	United Patriots (UP)	190	0.03
Mba Anthony Onyegbula	Alliance of Social Democrats (ASD)	183	0.03
Paschal Ejiogu	Alliance for New Nigeria (ANN)	171	0.02
Munonye Ikechukwu Obinna	Sustainable National Party (SNP)	173	0.02
Tony Kelvin Obinna	New Progressive Movement (NPM)	166	0.02
Clifford Okechukwu E.	Democratic Alternative (DA)	163	0.02
Daniel Ahizechukwu Okorojiaku	New Nigeria Peoples Party (NNPP)	157	0.02
Ike Ibe C.	Independent Democrats (ID)	144	0.02
Chigozie Jerry Iheanacho	Masses Movement of Nigeria (MMN)	132	0.02
Ikenna Chukwunenye Emmanuel	Change Advocacy Party (CAP)	125	0.02
Osuagwu Chigozie Chigozie	Yes Electorates Solidarity (YES)	116	0.02
Ben Diribe Eberechukwu	Grassroots Development Party of Nigeria (GDPN)	112	0.02
Nwokorie Donald C.	National Action Council (NAC)	108	0.02
Edwin Chigozie Uche	Alliance for Democracy (AD)	97	0.01
Ekeh Nosike Collins	Advanced Nigeria Democratic Party (ANDP)	86	0.01
Ubah Nathaniel C.	People's Redemption Party (PRP)	84	0.01
Jeffrey Chinedu Uzor	Association for Better Nigeria (ABN)	83	0.01
Duru Benneth Onyekachi	Nigeria Elements Progressive Party (NEPP)	68	0.01
Ononogbo Emeka Emmanuel	Green Party of Nigeria (GPN)	66	0.01
Adrian Chijioke Achodo	Mega Party of Nigeria (MPN)	59	0.01
Mbanefo Chris Ezuma	Alliance for a United Nigeria (AUN)	55	0.01
Okere Kingdom Nnamdi	Reformed Advanced Party (RAP)	53	0.01
Nnamdi Iwuanyanwu Isaac	Nigeria People's Congress (NPC)	53	0.01
Ikoku Michael Obinna	Young Democratic Party (YDP)	50	0.01
Prince Obumneme K. Nwaigbo	We The People Nigeria (WTPN)	47	0.01
Okechukwu Kingsley Okoroafor	Kowa Party (KP)	45	0.01
Igbokwe Marvin Chigozie	Nigeria Community Movement Party (NCMP)	43	0.01
Ochiama Otibe Excel	Fresh Democratic Party (FRESH)	40	0.01
Njoku Anne Philips	Re-build Nigeria Party (RBNP)	39	0.01
Ekegu Chigozie John	Save Nigeria Congress (SNC)	37	0.01
Abednego Elias Chukwuemeka	National Interest Party (NIP)	37	0.01
Onwubuariri Ijeoma	National Democratic Liberty Party (NDLP)	34	0.00
Canice Chukwuemeka Asonye	Justice Must Prevail Party (JMPP)	30	0.00
Abanno Barnabas Chibuzor	Coalition for Change (C4C)	26	0.00
Ikechukwu Nwaopara	Movement for the Restoration and Defence of Democracy (MRDD)	24	0.00
Total		714,055	100.00
Valid votes		714,055	96.60
Invalid/blank votes		25,130	3.40
Total votes		739,185	100.00
Registered voters/turnout		2,221,008	33.28
Source: INEC

=== By local government area ===
Here are the results of the election from the local government areas of the state for the two major parties. The total valid votes of 714,355 represents the 70 political parties that participated in the election. Green represents LGAs won by Ihedioha. Blue represents LGAs won by Nwosu. White represents LGAs won by others.

County (LGA)	Emeka Ihedioha PDP		Uche Nwosu AA		Total votes
County (LGA)	#	%	#	%	#
Aboh Mbaise	64,219		4,296		
Ahiazu Mbaise	32,987		3,395		
Ehime	5,238		5,477		
Ezinihitte Mbaise	30,035		2,646		
Ideato North	3,064		5,599		
Ideato South	3,600		40,138		
Ihitte/Uboma	4,235		5,444		
Ikeduru	14,848		4,006		
Isiala Mbano	3,589		3,383		
Isu	3,235		7,695		
Mbaitoli	13,358		5,869		
Ngor Okpala	11,502		4,797		
Njaba	4,043		8,297		
Nkwerre	1,889		8,205		
Nwangele	3,482		9,924		
Obowo	6,198		4,929		
Iguta	5,663		3,431		
Ohaji/Egbema	6,072		16,339		
Okigwe	5,443		8,469		
Onuimo	2,063		4,173		
Orlu	5,053		9,659		
Orsu	2,596		6,203		
Oru East	4,806		4,531		
Oru West	4,393		5,016		
Owerri Municipal	10,118		2,617		
Owerri North	12,797		2,988		
Owerri West	12,878		2,538		
Totals					-

== 20 December 2019: Supreme Court disqualified Uche Nwosu for Double Nomination due to being the nominated candidate of both APC and AA parties; Hope Uzodinma is not the legal APC candidate ==
The Supreme Court in Nwosu v APC dismissed the appeal with Justice Amina Augie upholding the findings of both the trial court and the Court of Appeal with respect to the fact that Ugwumba Uche Nwosu was in fact the nominated Imo State Governorship Candidate of the Action Alliance [AA] and the All Progressives Congress [APC] contrary to Section 37 of the Electoral Act 2010 [as amended] and sustained his [Ugwumba Uche Nwosu] disqualification from contesting the Imo State Governorship election.

This informed the decision of the PDP and APP to file different applications at the Supreme Court seeking for the court to give effect to its judgment delivered on 20th December 2019 and that the PDP candidate, Hon. Emeka Ihedioha be declared the winner of the election as a result of the APC being precluded from sponsoring two candidates (Ugwumba Uche Nwosu and Hope Uzodinma) in the Imo State governorship election.

After an unusual 3 year delay and barring any further unforeseen circumstances, the Supreme Court announced that it will hear the motion of the Peoples Democratic Party and Action Peoples Party respectively, seeking to enforce its judgment that APC did not field any candidate following the disqualification of its duly nominated candidate, Ugwumba Uche Nwosu on 31st October 2023.

== 14 January 2020: Results voided, Hope Uzodinma confirmed rightful governor ==
While the Independent National Electoral Commission had announced the governorship election results in March 2019, the results were challenged in the Nigerian courts. The court held that hundreds of thousands of votes, from 388 polling units, had been wrongly excluded from the vote count in March, and that (initially) fourth place finisher Hope Uzodinma had received the majority of lawful votes cast across the state.

The next day, on 15 January 2020, Uzodinma and Placid Njoku were sworn in as the Governor of Imo State and Deputy Governor of Imo State, respectively.
