= Heroes Square (Nigeria) =

Heroes Square Nigeria

Coordinates: 5.4767°N 7.0181°E

- Ndubuisi Kanu Square, The Ojukwu Center
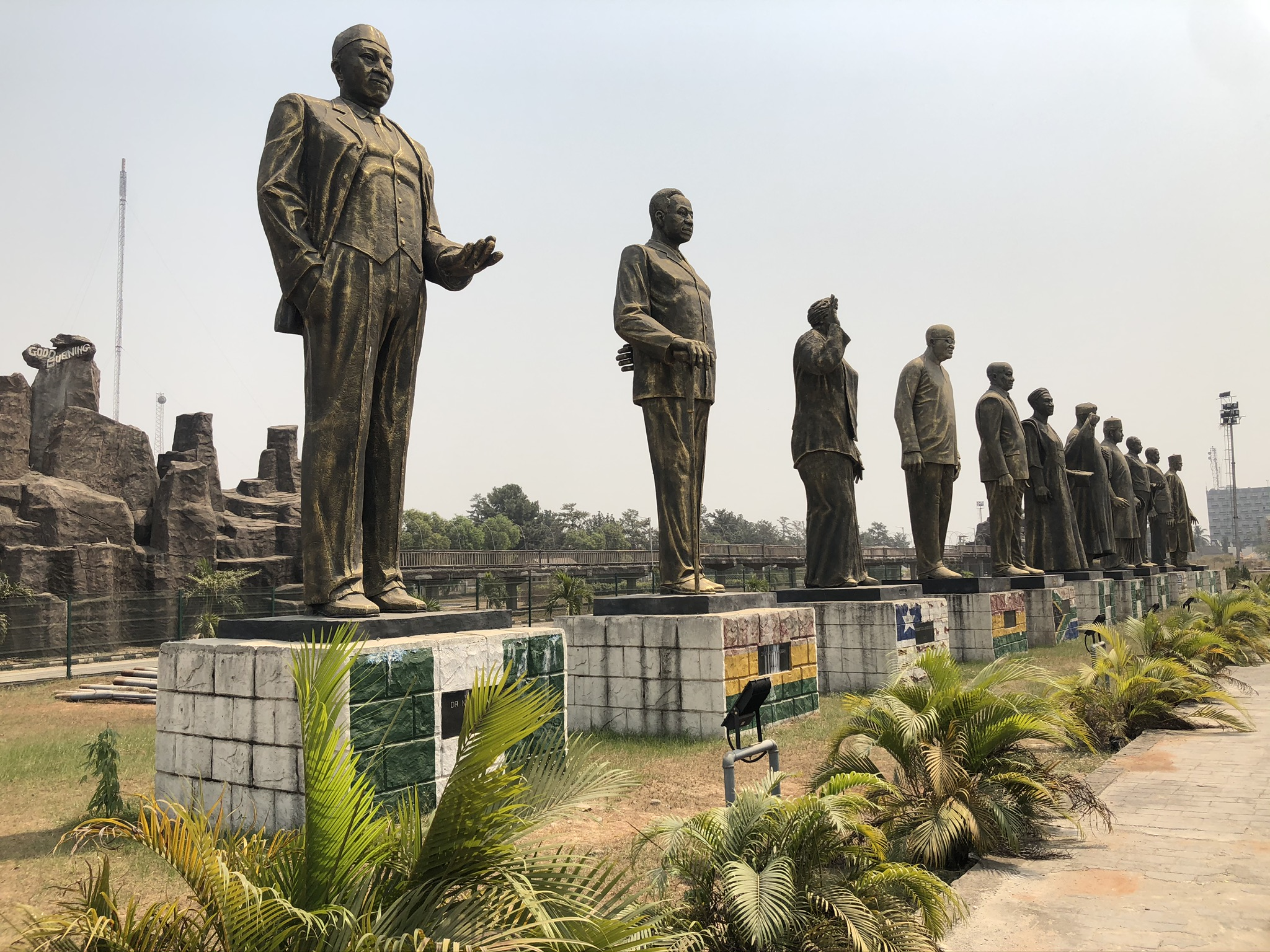
- Type: Monument
- Location: Owerri, Nigeria
- Established: 2012
- Owner: Government of Imo State
- Other information: Established by Rochas Okorocha

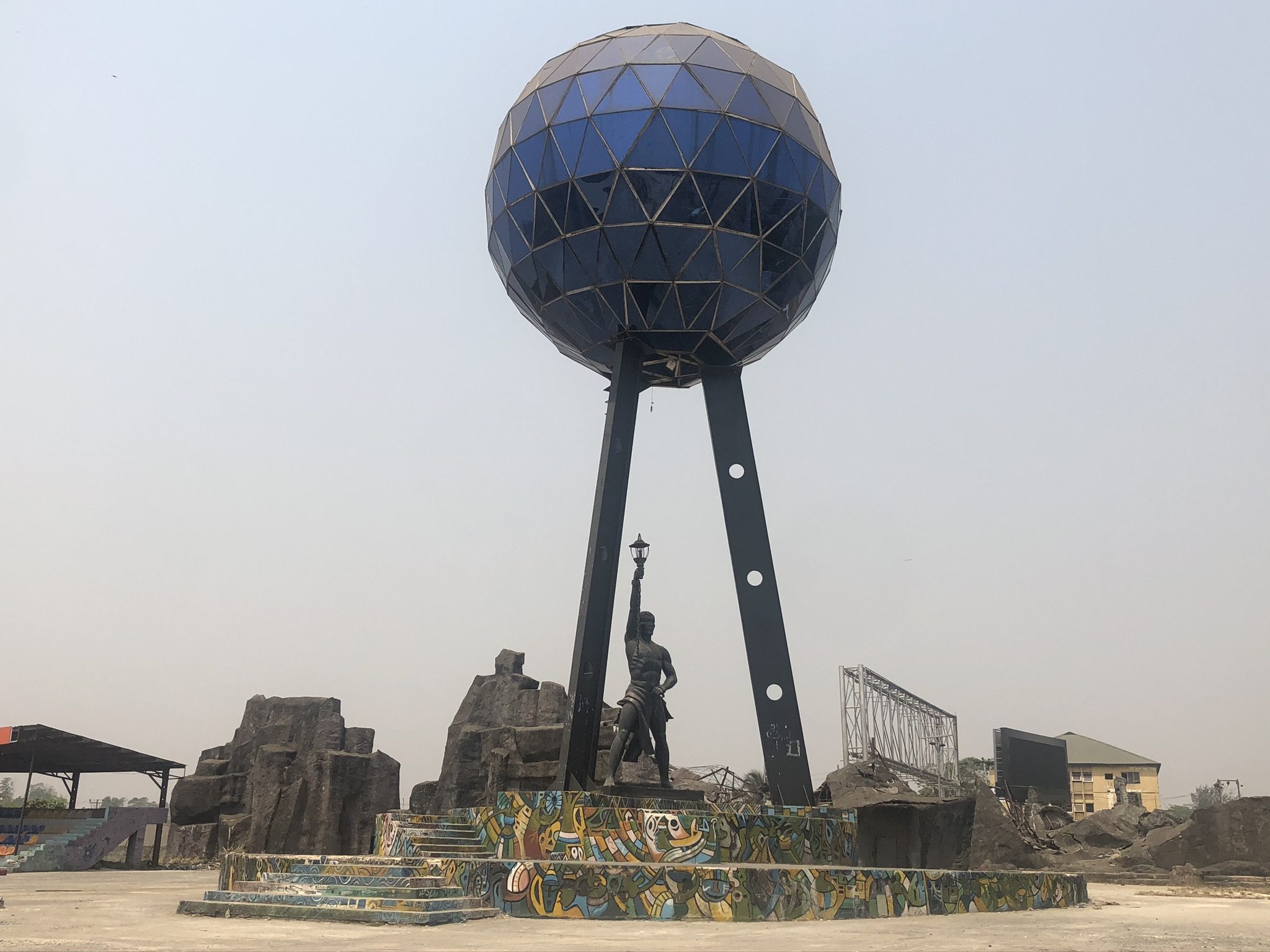

Heroes Square, Owerri, also known as Ndubuisi Kanu Square or The Ojukwu Center, is a public park, square, monument and tourist landmark located in Owerri, the capital of Imo State, Nigeria.

The square was built as a tribute shortly after the death of former President of Biafra Chukwuemeka Odumegwu Ojukwu by former Governor of Imo State, Rochas Okorocha in 2012. It honors other Pan-African leaders and global figures including Nnamdi Azikiwe, Akanu Ibiam, Martin Luther King Jr., Sam Mbakwe, Ellen Johnson Sirleaf, Alex Ekwueme Kwame Nkrumah, Muhammadu Buhari, Jacob Zuma, Obafemi Awolowo, and Ajayi Crowther. It was renamed in 2021 by Hope Uzodimma in honor of former military governor of Imo and Lagos States Ndubuisi Kanu.

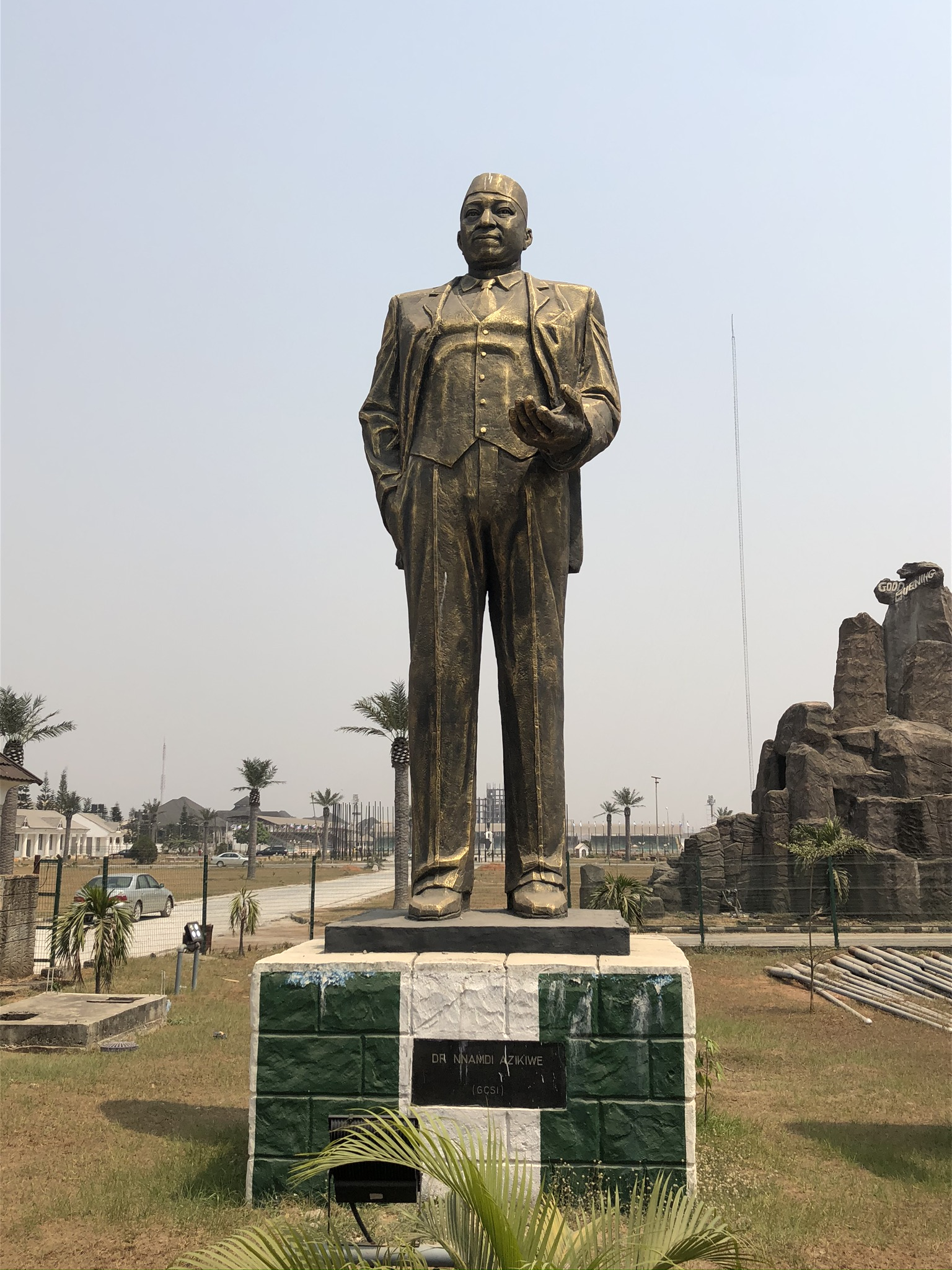

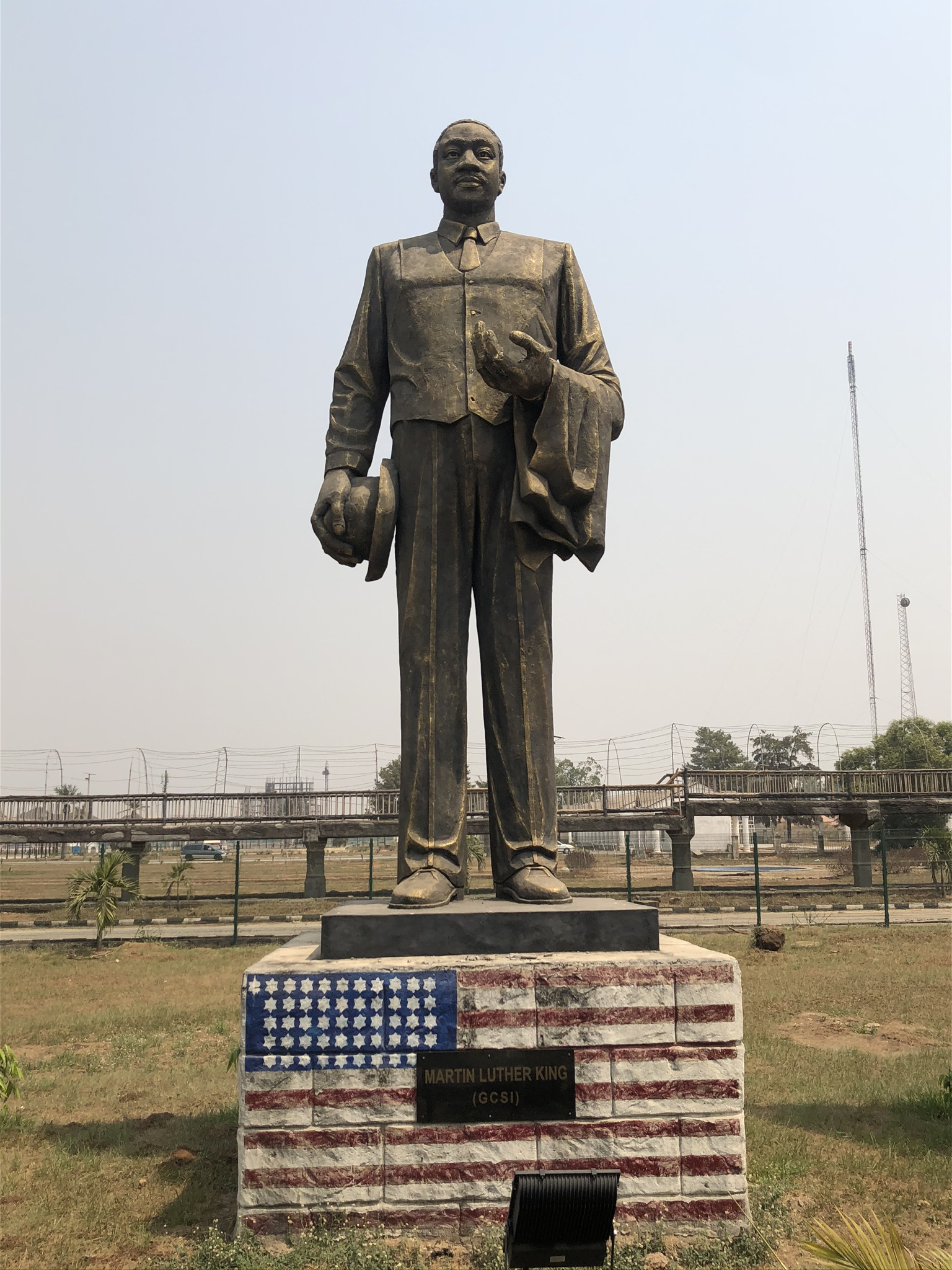

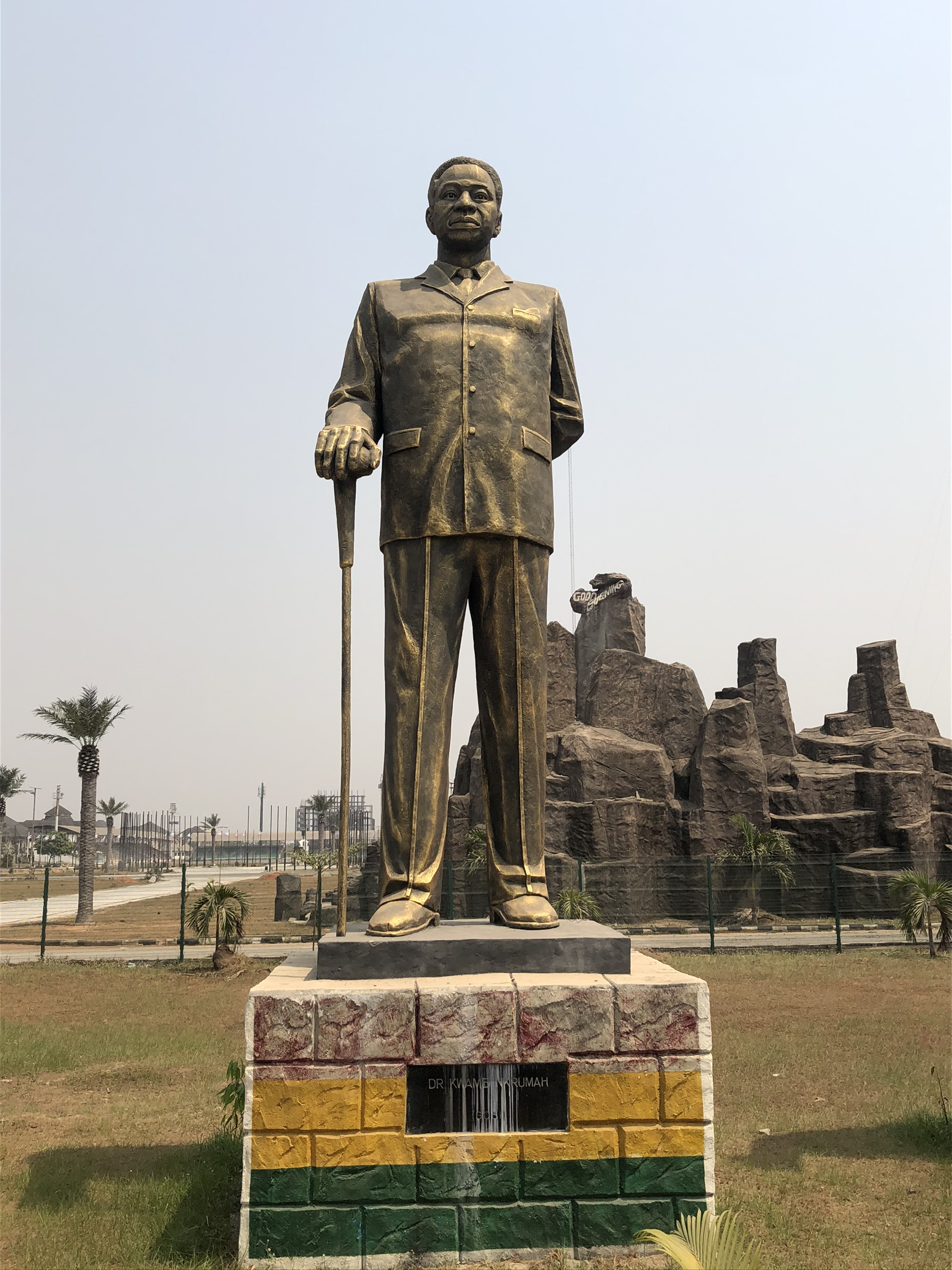
