= Government of Imo State =

State government in Nigeria

Imo State Government
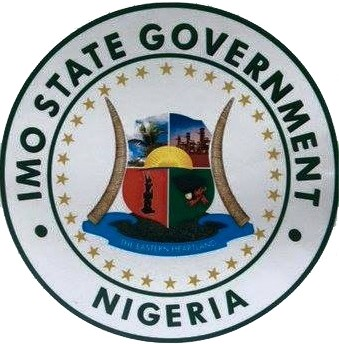
- Formation: 1979 (47 years ago)
- Jurisdiction: Imo State
- Website: imostate.gov.ng

Legislative branch
- Legislature: House of Assembly
- Meeting place: Imo State House of Assembly

Executive branch
- Leader: Governor
- Appointer: Direct popular vote
- Headquarters: Government House, Imo State
- Main organ: Executive Council of Imo State
- Departments: 13 Ministries

Judicial branch
- Court: Imo State High Court of Justice
- Seat: Owerri

The Government of Imo State, also called The Imo State Government, consists of the elected representatives and appointed officials responsible for the government of Imo State, Nigeria. Imo State has a population of over 4 to 5 million people, and is one of the 36 states that make up the Federal Republic of Nigeria. The state government is composed of the executive, legislative, and judicial branches, whose powers are vested by the Constitution in the Imo State House of Assembly, the Governor and the High Court. The judiciary operates independently of the executive and the legislature. At the local level, elected officials are in charge of local government areas.

== The Governor ==
A vote by a two-thirds majority in the House can overrule the governor. The same vote is required to initiate an impeachment process of the governor or his deputy. In all cases where the chief executive is unable to discharge his or her duties, the deputy governor assumes the office of Acting Governor until the governor resumes duty, or until election of a new one.

== The Deputy Governor ==
Placid Njoku formally held the position of the Deputy Governor of Imo State from January 15, 2020, until January 14, 2024. The current governor, Hope Uzodinma, chose him to be his running-mate during the 2019 general election. The current Deputy Governor since January 15, 2024, is Chinyere Ekomaru.

== Principal Officers ==
Office	Incumbent
Governor	Hope Odidika Uzodimma
Deputy Governor	Prof. Placid Njoku
Secretary to the State Government	Chief Cosmas Iwu
Chief of Staff	Nnamdi Anyaehie
Head of Service	??
Deputy Chief of Staff	Chima Nwanna
Principal Secretary to the Governor	Dr (Mrs) Irene Chima

== Commissioners ==
Office	Incumbent
Commissioner for Agriculture, Environment, and Natural Resources	Cosmas Nwabueze Maduba
Commissioner for Commerce and Industry	Henry Chidi Ibe
Commissioner for Community Government, Culture, and Traditional Affairs	Obulimba Innocent Ekeh
Commissioner for Education, Science, and Technology	Gertrude Ego Oduka
Commissioner for Finance	Obinna Mbata
Commissioner for Internal Resources and Pension Matters	Ifeanyi Ararume
Commissioner for Justice	Miletus Maduakolam Onukaogu Nlemedim
Commissioner for Lands, Survey, Housing, and Urban Development	Nicholas Anayo Amaefule
Commissioner for Local Government and Rural Development	Emma Ibediro
Commissioner for Sports, Public Safety, and Public Utilities	Rodney Tony Ajaelu
Commissioner for Works	Ralph Nwosu
Commissioner for Health	Dr. Chioma Vivian Egu
Commissioner for Information	Obinna Nshirim

== Legislature ==
Current members of the House of Assembly include:

- Osakwe Modestus
- Obinna Egu
- Vitalis Azodo
- Ugochukwu Amuchie
