= Obazu =

Town in Imo state, Nigeria

Coordinates: 05°34′20″N 07°03′13″E

Obazu in Imo State is one of the autonomous communities in Mbieri ancient kingdom of Imo state. It is made up of seven villages, namely: Umueze, Umuchoke, Umuchimanwiri, Amaogwugwu, Obilubi, Umuneke and Umunkwo in order of seniority. It is located at the eastern part of Mbieri and share boundaries with Umuoba, Orji and Owuala of Uratta people (Owerri North), Amatta and Akabo (Ikeduru) and Umunjam, Amaulu, Eziome, Achi, Umuagwu, Ubakuru and Amankuta (all of Mbieri town). The people are mostly Anglican though there are other Christian denomination followers among her people. Here is the text visible in the image:

⸻

MIGRATION:

Emboldened by different victories in war, pressed by economic hardship and population growth (the land could not support the group) the hunters dispersed into groups of families of Amaruru Obaji towards neighbouring villages in Mbieri-Mbaitoli. Through these dispersals they found a warrior group who inhabited the forest region lying between Achi/ Eziome and Umunjam to the west, and reaching down to the edge of Iyi Okitankwo (streamlet) to the north. The warrior group, weakened by internal and external strifes which had depopulated them, were ready to welcome the immigrants.

By the beginning of the 15th century, two hunters, Choke and Nkwo, with their families settled in the new found land. Together, the inhabitants, called Umureke (Umuneke) and the immigrants lived in the forest region lying between the present Methodist Church, near Afo Obazu, and the C.M.S. premises. Before the end of the 15th century, the remaining four hunters and their families who had remained at Iho joined their kith and kin at Mbieri. The four other hunters were Eze, Ogwugwu, Chimanwiri and Obilubi.

The land the settlers reached was larger than Amaruru Obaji in Iho and probably wetter with more vegetation and greater fertility over a wider area than it has today. Wildlife abounded. The place was suitable for the purpose of the hunter-gatherers.

== Notes ==
- Place name, location and co-ordinates verified using GEOnet Names Server, National Geospatial-Intelligence Agency.
