= Success Akagburuonye =

Nigerian Businessman

- Born: Obioma Success Akagburuonye; February 22, 1966 (age 60)
- Education: Kogi State University
- Occupation: Business man

Obioma Success Akagburuonye is a Nigerian businessman, engineer, philanthropist, and chief executive officer Praco International Limited, a real estate and community development firm known for integrating affordable housing. In January 2026, he was named the Humanitarian Icon of the Year 2025 by Sun Newspaper and is the Akaraogu Ndigbo, a title he has held since 2013.

== Early life and education ==
Akagburuonye was born on 22 February 1966 to the family of Late Nehemiah Akagburuonye Amuchie of Umuoshike Ogbor Uvuru, Aboh Mbaise, Imo State. He did his Primary education at Town School Ogbor between 1974 and 1980 and Secondary School education at Oke-Ovoro Secondary School, Mbaise, between 1980 and 1985. He holds both Bachelor of Science and Master of Science degrees in Civil Engineering, as well as bachelor's degrees in Law and Master of Laws (LLM) from the Kogi State University, Anyigba, Kogi State.

== Career ==
In 1996, Akagburuonye founded Praco International Company with interests in civil engineering and real estate and in 2001, he established other business chains like Psalm 127 Limited, Peace Be Still Hotel, Canaan Side, Obisco Plastics, Oburu na Jehovah Echeghi Obodo Shopping Plaza and Divine Foundation Property Limited, amongst others.

He was called to the Nigerian bar on January 17, 2012, and established his law chambers, "O.S. Akagburuonye & Co. (Akara Ugo Chambers)" in Abuja in March 2012. In 2022, he made headlines with the case against the Federal Capital Territory Authority (FCTA) where he solicited for lands seized and structures demolished by the FCTA, to be returned which the judgment was entered in his favour by the Federal High Court of Nigeria in 2022.

Akagburuonye was the gubernatorial candidate for Action Democratic Party (ADP) in the Imo State elections in 2019 and a 2026 Imo State gubernatorial candidate under the All Progressive Congress.

== Awards and recognition ==
- Justice of Peace: Ministry of Justice, Imo State, May 2019.
- Ambassador of the Kingdom, Assemblies of God Church, Nigeria: March 2019.
- United Nations Award for Philanthropic and Humanitarian Services in Nigeria: September 2018, New York, USA.
- Doctorate, Honorary Causa in Philanthropic Management and Theology: Freedom University, Philadelphia, USA, 2013.
- National Life Patron of the United Igbo Elders Council (UNIEC)
- 2025 Sun Newspapers Humanitarian Service Icon Award
