= Independence Ogunewe =

Nigerian politician (1960–2018)

Independence Chiedoziem Ogunewe (April 22, 1960 in Warri — April 3, 2018 in Abuja) was a Nigerian politician who represented Ahiazu Mbaise and Ezinihitte Mbaise in the Nigerian House of Representatives from 2003 to 2011. Ogunewe was a member of the Peoples Democratic Party.

== Political career ==
Ogunewe served as chair of various legislative committees, including aviation, cooperation and integration in Africa, and budget monitoring and price intelligence; he was also the deputy chair of the subcommittee on pensions.

In 2009, Ogunewe was stripped of his committee memberships and suspended from the legislature for "un-parliamentary conduct": after being told by Speaker of the House Dimeji Bankole to sit down instead of "roaming the Chamber and discussing with some of his colleagues while plenary session was ongoing", Ogunewe instead said "I have heard you" and then walked out of the session. The vote to suspend Ogunewe for fourteen legislative days was almost unanimous, with only one member opposing. In the aftermath of this suspension, a group of Ogunewe's consistuents attempted to have him recalled, stating that he was "completely inaccessible [with] no visible constituency office", and that he had not "sponsored any motion or bill"; the Daily Champion posited that this opposition may have been "scripted", noting that Ogunewe claimed to be motivated by anti-corruption activities, and advocated "accountability and transparency".

In June 2010, Ogunewe was indefinitely suspended from the legislature, as part of a group of 11 legislators who had sought Bankole's removal as Speaker on grounds of corruption, and who had been part of a "brawl". In December of that year, however, a Nigerian court struck down that suspension, on the grounds that Ogunewe and the other legislators had not received a hearing before the suspension, and also that the House only had the authority to suspend members for up to 14 days. Bankole was subsequently ordered to repay Ogunewe's salary for the months of suspension.

In 2015, Ogunewe was expelled from the Peoples Democratic Party for "gross anti-party activities during the recent governorship election in Imo State."
