= Abazu =

Abazu may refer to:

- Abazu, Myanmar, a village in the Bago Division of Myanmar
- Abazu (Assyrian king) (fl. c. 2257 BCE - c. 2244 BCE)
- Abazu-Akabo, an autonomous community in Ikeduru Local Government Area of Imo State, Nigeria
