= Uju Onwudiwe =

Nigerian politician

Imo State House of Assembly
- In office 2015–2023
- Constituency: Njaba

Personal details
- Citizenship: Nigeria
- Education: Queen's College, Enugu
- Alma mater: Enugu State University of Science and Technology; University of Nigeria, Enugu Campus
- Occupation: Politician; Financial Expert
- Nickname: Igolo Njaba

Uju Onwudiwe, popularly known as Igolo Njaba, is a Nigerian politician and member of the Imo State House of Assembly. She represents the Njaba State Constituency in Owerri, Imo State.

== Academic background ==
Uju Onwudiwe received her early secondary education at Queen’s College, Enugu. She later studied Accountancy at Enugu State University of Science and Technology (ESUT), where she earned a Bachelor of Science (B.Sc.) degree. She also obtained a Master of Business Administration (MBA) from the University of Nigeria, Enugu Campus (UNEC).

== Career ==
Uju Onwudiwe has worked as an administrator and financial professional, with experience in organizations such as Arab Contractors, Mefor Systems Inc., and Nnamdi Nwakwesi & Co.

Since her inauguration into the 8th Imo State House of Assembly, she has participated in legislative activities, including sponsoring motions and contributing to bills. Her work focuses on areas such as poverty reduction, economic development, and public safety, while representing her constituency.

== Honours and awards ==
Uju Onwudiwe has received recognition from community groups and institutions. She was honoured by women in Njaba with the title Igolo (“shining light”).
