= Onicha Nwe-Nkwo =

Town in Imo State, Nigeria

Onicha Nwe-Nkwo is an autonomous community in Ezinihitte Local Government Area, Mbaise, Imo State, Nigeria.

Onicha Nwe-Nkwo Autonomous Community is one of the four autonomous communities that resulted from the carving up of Onicha Amairi Autonomous Community. It consists of Umuevu, Umuhu & Umuaghara villages, and has its seat of power or headquarters, so to speak, at Nkwo Umuevu, a market in Umuevu after which it was named. Religion: Christianity is the primary religion of the Autonomous Community which also maintains a traditional religion. Worshipping at St Patricks’ Catholic Church, Umuevu and St Theresa's Catholic Church, Umuhu, Catholics outnumber, by far, any other denomination.

Royalty The first traditional ruler was Eze Alph Azuogu Ezeh. Presently, the town is embroiled in crises as many people are laying claim to the traditional throne. Mention must also be made that the first recognised traditional ruler of Onicha Amairi, the late Onugotu, Eze Ihunze Onyeneho came from Umuevu in Onicha Nwenkwo.

The ruling cabinet consist of the following:

The Eze: Eze (Dr) Ifeanyichukwu Uwahemu. Nkwo11 of Onicha Nwenkwo Autonomous Community, Ezinihitte Mbaise, Local Government Area of Imo State, Nigeria. Isi-Nze(Traditional Prime minister): High Chief, Sir Mathew Ihuoma. Ikenga (Spiritual Leader): High Chief, Barristar Sylvanus Enyeribe Chima(ksm). Obi:(Defence Minister) Royal High Chief Mgbechikwere Chima (Phd)-Agbogidi Akanezigwe. Nze-Obi: Nze Camillus Ntiwunka. Nzes Chiefs Ichies Okaruos

Other selected titled village Representatives
