= Chioma Uzodimma =

Nigerian lawyer

Chioma Ikeaka-Uzodimma

First Lady of Imo State
- Governor: Hope Uzodimma

Personal details
- Born: Chioma Ikeaka-Uzodimma; December 15, 1990 (age 35) Aba, Abia State, Nigeria
- Spouse: Hope Uzodimma
- Occupation: Lawyer

Chioma Ikeaka-Uzodimma is a Nigerian lawyer and the First Lady of Imo State as the wife of the incumbent governor of Imo State, Hope Uzodimma.

== Early Life and Education ==
Chioma Deborah Ikeaka was born in Aba, then part of Imo State on December 15, 1990. She was born into the Ikeaka family of Dikenafai in the Ideato South Local Government Area of Imo State.

She lived in Aba for most of her life where she attended elementary at the International Early Learning Centre and Secondary education at Dority International Secondary School. She then enrolled into the Imo State University, Owerri where she graduated with a Bachelor of Laws (LLB) degree in 2011.

== Career ==
She began her career as a lawyer and worked as a junior associate for Emeka Etiaba, Rickey Tarfa and Chris Uche law firms.

== Personal life ==
She married her husband in 2015 and they have four children. She is a devout Catholic.

At the time of her husband's inauguration as governor, she was the youngest First Lady in Nigeria.

As First Lady, she is a philanthropist who has given donations to organizations catering for widows, children and the physically challenged and has visited orphanage homes in Imo State, she is also a child health advocate.

She is the founder of GoodHope Flourish Foundation, an organization formed to combat gender violence and promoting women rights.
