= 2015 Nigerian Senate elections in Imo State =

2015 Nigerian Senate election in Imo State

The 2015 Nigerian Senate election in Imo State was held on March 28, 2015, to elect members of the Nigerian Senate to represent Imo State. Samuel Anyanwu representing Imo East and Hope Uzodinma representing Imo West won on the platform of Peoples Democratic Party, while Benjamin Uwajumogu representing Imo North won on the platform of All Progressives Congress.

== Overview ==
Affiliation	Party		Total
Affiliation	PDP	APC	Total
Before Election			3
After Election	2	1	3

== Summary ==
District	Incumbent	Party	Elected Senator	Party
Imo East			Samuel Anyanwu	PDP
Imo West			Hope Uzodinma	PDP
Imo North			Benjamin Uwajumogu	APC

== Results ==
=== Imo East ===
Peoples Democratic Party candidate Samuel Anyanwu won the election, defeating All Progressives Congress candidate Uchechukwu Onyeagocha and other party candidates.

2015 Nigerian Senate election in Imo State
Party	Candidate	Votes	%
PDP	Samuel Anyanwu		
APC	Uchechukwu Onyeagocha		
Total votes			
PDP hold			

=== Imo West ===
Peoples Democratic Party candidate Hope Uzodinma won the election, defeating All Progressives Congress candidate Osita Izunaso and other party candidates.

2015 Nigerian Senate election in Imo State
Party	Candidate	Votes	%
PDP	Hope Uzodinma		
APC	Osita Izunaso		
Total votes			
PDP hold			

=== Imo North ===
All Progressives Congress candidate Benjamin Uwajumogu won the election, defeating Peoples Democratic Party candidate Achonu Nneji and other party candidates.

2015 Nigerian Senate election in Imo State
Party	Candidate	Votes	%
APC	Benjamin Uwajumogu		
PDP	Achonu Nneji		
Total votes			
APC hold			
