= Samuel Anyanwu =

Nigerian politician

Senator Samuel Anyanwu

National Secretary of the People's Democratic Party (PDP)
- In office November 2021 – November 2025

Senator in the 8th Nigeria National Assembly
- In office June 2015 – June 2019
- Preceded by: Chris Anyanwu
- Succeeded by: Onyewuchi Francis Ezenwa
- Constituency: Imo East

Member of the Imo State House of Assembly
- In office 2007–2015

Chairman of Ikeduru Local Government Area
- In office 2004–2007

Transition Committee Chairman, Ikeduru LGA
- In office 2003–2004

Personal details
- Born: 18 June 1965 (age 61) Amaimo, Ikeduru, Imo State, Nigeria
- Party: PDP
- Spouse: Florence Olachi Anyanwu (m. 1986)
- Children: 3
- Education: University of Port Harcourt; Cambridge Judge Business School; Harvard Kennedy School

Samuel Nnaemeka Anyanwu (born 18 June 1965) known as Sam Daddy is a Nigerian business executive, philanthropist and politician who served as the national secretary of the People’s Democratic Party (PDP) from November 2021 until his expulsion for anti-party activities in November 2025.

== Early life and education ==
Samuel Anyanwu was born on 18 June 1965 in Obodo, Amaimo, Ikeduru Local Government Area of Imo State to Chief Sebastine Anyanwu (Father) and chief Mrs Virginia Anyanwu (mother). He had his primary education at Modern Day Primary School, Aba and attended Iho Comprehensive School, Ikeduru for his secondary education. He earned a bachelor’s degree in political science and a master’s degree in public administration from University of Port Harcourt before studying at the Cambridge Judge Business School and Harvard Kennedy School. Anyanwu is a Fellow of the Paul Harris Institute.

== Career ==
=== Business ===
Anyanwu founded several businesses including Sonada Oil, Sam Daddy Farms, Sam Daddy Investments Ltd, Newseed Communications and New View Engineering Nig. Ltd operating in the energy, agriculture and telecommunication sectors.

He has also founded non-profit organizations including So Others May Eat (S.O.M.E) Foundation – a charity organization focused on helping the less privileged.

=== Politics ===
Anyanwu began his political career in 2003 when he was appointed Transition Committee chairman of Ikeduru Local Government Area of Imo State serving concurrently as the secretary of the Association of Local Government of Nigeria (ALGON), Imo State chapter. He was elected chairman of Ikeduru LGA on the ticket of PDP in 2004 and served until 2007 when he contested and won Ikeduru State Constituency seat in the Imo State House of Assembly serving two terms (2007-2015). In the state assembly he chaired House Committee on Public Accounts, Finance, and Commerce and Industry and was Vice chairman of the House Committee on Ethics, Petitions and Privileges.

Anyanwu was elected to the 8th Senate of Nigeria from Imo East Senatorial district on the ticket of the PDP in 2015. He served as the chairman, Senate Committee on Ethics, Privileges and Public Petitions and served on several other senate committees. In 2017, he sponsored the bill for the establishment of South East Development Commission passed by the 8th Senate but was vetoed by President Buhari. The bill was re-introduced in the 10th National Assembly co-sponsored by deputy speaker of the House of Representatives, Benjamin Kalu and other lawmakers from the South East and was passed by the house in December 2023 and passed in the senate in February 2024.

He contested for the PDP’s ticket to run in the 2019 Imo governorship election but was not successful. He emerged as the 2023 Gubernatorial Candidate of the PDP after Emeka Ihedioha failed to garner support of party members.

In 2021, Anyanwu was elected national secretary of the PDP. In 2023, senior members of the party took him to court challenging his continued stay as the national secretary of the party while contesting the 2023 Imo State gubernatorial election. On 15 March 2025, the Supreme Court recognised Anyanwu as the authentic national secretary of the PDP.

Anyanwu was sacked by the Federal Capital Territory High Court on 15 December 2023 in a suit filed by a chieftain of the party Douglas Nwachukwu. On December 20, 2024, the Enugu Division of the Court of Appeal upheld the judgement of the high court that sacked Anyanwu as PDP national secretary. The court ordered Sunday Ude-Okoye to take over as PDP national secretary on the ground that Anyanwu had relinquished his position as PDP national secretary when he was duly nominated by the party and participated in the November 11, 2023 Imo State Gubernatorial election. The incumbent governor Hope Uzodinma of the APC scored 540,308 votes to defeat Anyanwu who came distant second with a paltry 71,503 votes to fail in his second dismal attempt at governing Imo State.

On 15 March 2025, the Supreme Court affirmed him as the authentic national secretary of the party following protracted legal battle instituted by a faction of the party challenging the legality of him holding that office. He served as a senator in the 8th Nigeria National Assembly representing Imo East Senatorial District from 2015 to 2019. He sponsored the bill for the establishment of South East Development Commission passed by the 8th Senate but was vetoed by President Buhari.

== Philanthropy ==
He is the founder and president of So Others May Eat (S.O.M.E) Foundation and Sam Daddy Musterseed Foundation – non-profit organizations helping the poor.

== Personal life ==
Anyanwu is married and blessed with Children.
