= 2015 Imo State gubernatorial election =

- April 11, 2015
| Nominee | Rochas Okorocha | Emeka Ihedioha |
| Party | APC | PDP |
| Popular vote | 416,996 | 320,705 |
Governor before election
Rochas Okorocha
APC
Elected Governor
Rochas Okorocha
APC

The 2015 Imo State gubernatorial election was the 8th gubernatorial election of Imo State.Held on April 11, 2015, and April 25, 2015, due to inconclusive, the All Progressives Congress nominee Rochas Okorocha won the election, defeating Emeka Ihedioha of the People's Democratic Party.

== APC primary ==
APC candidate, Rochas Okorocha clinched the party ticket.The APC primary election was held in 2014.

== PDP primary ==
PDP candidate, Emeka Ihedioha clinched the party ticket.The PDP primary election was held in 2014.

== Results ==
A total of 22 candidates contested in the election. Rochas Okorocha from the All Progressives Congress won the election, defeating Emeka Ihedioha from the People's Democratic Party. Valid votes was 782,528, votes cast was 806,764.

2015 Imo State gubernatorial election
| Party | Candidate | Votes | % | ±% |
|---|---|---|---|---|
| APC | Rochas Okorocha | 416,996 | | |
| PDP | Emeka Ihedioha | 320,705 | | |
| APC hold | | | | |
