= Chioma Rosemary Onyekaba =

Nigerian writer, publisher, entrepreneur, and creative industry professional

Second Lady of Imo State
- Assumed role 17 June 2017 – 29 May 2023

Personal details
- Born: 9 November 1993 (age 32) Jos, Plateau State, Nigeria
- Spouse: Prince Madumere
- Education: University of Benin
- Profession: Writer, publisher, entrepreneur

Chioma Rosemary Onyekaba (also known as Chioma Rosemary Madumere) is a Nigerian writer, publisher, entrepreneur, and creative industry professional. She is the founder and chief executive of several publishing, printing, media, and creative service businesses and served as Second Lady of Imo State from 2017 to 2019 following her marriage to Prince Ezeakonobi (Eze) Madumere.

== Early life and education ==
Chioma Rosemary Onyekaba was born in Jos, Plateau State, and hails from Eluama in the Isuikwuato Local Government Area of Abia State.

She earned a Bachelor of Arts degree in English Language and Literature from Abia State University, Uturu, and later obtained a Master of Arts degree in Parliamentary Administration from the University of Benin.

Academic thesis deposited in the National Institute for Legislative and Democratic Studies repository (author name Onyekaba, Chioma Rosemary) on legislative‑executive relations.

She also completed professional training in tourism and travel services management through IATA‑affiliated programs. She has completed industry training in travel and aviation and is listed in professional profiles noting awards and distinctions from IATA training programs.

== Career ==
Onyekaba has worked across writing, publishing, printing, branding, media production, and business management. She is the founder and managing director/CEO of Beauty & Brains Foundation Printing Press Nig. Ltd. (BBF Printing Press) and the founder or principal of multiple related ventures, including Cromstar Nig. Ltd., Cromstar Studio, Crombooks Store, All Times Global Magazine, Chioma's Literary Services, BBF Graphics, BBF Fashion, BBF Beauty Lounge, BBF E‑Shop, BBF Food and Snacks, Chirose Illustrations, ChitheRealtor, and BBF Travels and Tours Ltd. These enterprises operate across publishing, creative services, branding, travel, and lifestyle sectors.

She has served as publisher and editor‑in‑chief of All Times Global Magazine and provides literary, editing, and book‑production services through Chioma's Literary Services.

Onyekaba writes poetry, fiction, and nonfiction; her work frequently explores relationships, resilience, and social realities.

=== Second Lady of Imo State ===
Following her marriage to Prince Ezeakonobi Madumere, who served as Deputy Governor of Imo State, Onyekaba assumed the public role commonly referred to as Second Lady of Imo State during the period around 2017–2019. Her marriage and public appearances were reported in national and regional media.

== Personal life ==
Onyekaba married Prince Ezeakonobi Madumere in 2017; the union was covered by national media. The couple has children. Media reports announced the birth of a daughter following the marriage.

== Selected works ==
- With Every Fiber in Me (poetry), African Books Collective, 2024.
- Wives Are for Rainy Days, Side Chicks Are for Best Days (title attributed in online listings).
- Other titles attributed to her in publisher and author profiles include Silent Tears, Wellspring of Emotions, More Serious than Tears, and August Lust.

== See also ==
- List of first ladies of Nigerian states
