= Kingsley Ononuju =

Nigerian lawyer and politician

Kingsley Ononuju is a Nigerian lawyer and politician from Imo State. Currently he is the Commissioner for Special Projects in the Executive Council of Imo State. Previously he was the Commissioner for Commerce and Industry.

== Career ==
Kingsley was first appointed as Commissioner for Commerce and Industry before being moved to his present position as Commissioner for Special Projects in 2020. As a lawyer, he has been an adviser to the head of the New Partnership for Africa's Development (NEPAD) and HOD Infrastructure under the Nigerian Presidency. He also acted as the state NEPAD/African Peer Review Mechanism (APRM) Coordinator for Imo state. He appointed Elder Hippolite Uzoka as chairman, Imo Cooperative Federation.

== Other ==
In July 2017 he was involved in an incident where he was kidnapped and later released. In 2022, he actively supported the Peter Obi candidacy for 2023 Nigerian Presidential Elections under the Labour Party of Nigeria. But at present, he and many other political associates who were under the Labour party in Imo state have returned to the All Progressives Congress party as the 2023 Imo State gubernatorial election approaches.
