= Amara Iwuanyanwu =

Nigerian politician

Amara Chyna Iwuanyanwu

Deputy Speaker of the Imo State House of Assembly
- Constituency: Nwangele State Constituency

Personal details
- Born: Imo State, Nigeria
- Occupation: Politician

Amara Chyna Iwuanyanwu is a Nigerian politician who served as Deputy Speaker of the Imo State House of Assembly, representing Nwangele state constituency.
