= Okwu =

Autonomous community in Imo State, Nigeria

Okwu is one of the autonomous communities in Ikeduru Local Government Area (LGA) in Imo State, Nigeria. "Okwu ikeduru" can also refer to the broader region of Ugri-Ike-Okwu, which are part of the Ikeduru LGA and contains the towns of Okwu along with other communities like Inyishi, Ugirike, Eziama, and Ikembara, which are considered early settlements of Ikeduru.

== History ==
Okwu is one of the first communities to be established by the early sons of the founder of Ikeduru; Ikechukwu Duruaku. It is one of the 24 autonomous communities that make up the Ikeduru Local Government Area.

Okwu is the third child of Ikeduru and have eight descendants namely (in no particular order):

- Akwuli
- Umuchima
- Umunogbo
- Ogada
- Umunohu
- Umuocham
- Umuehihe
- Umukpehi

While Okwu has seven direct descendants, Umukpehi was birthed from Umunogbo, with their village situated across the Onuakpaka river and sharing a border with Ogwuama in Ahiazu Mbaise.
