= George Eche =

Eche Ezenna Uchenna George is a Nigerian accountant and Politician from Imo State.

== Biography ==
Eche pursued an MBA in Banking and Finance from Imo State University and obtained a PhD in Accountancy from the University of Jos.

Eche held different positions within the Imo State government, including Accountant General and Secretary to the State Government (SSG). He also served as Permanent Secretary roles for the Ministry of Finance, Ministry of Works, and Ministry of Transport, contributing to budgeting and auditing.

In the realm of politics, Eche contested for the 2019 APC gubernatorial ticket in Imo State and continues to focus on improving financial processes across various systems.
