= Ikembara =

Town in Imo State, Nigeria

Ikembara is a village in southeastern Nigeria. It is located near the city of Owerri in Ikeduru local Government Area.
