= Linus Okorie =

Nigerian entrepreneur

Linus Okorie MFR
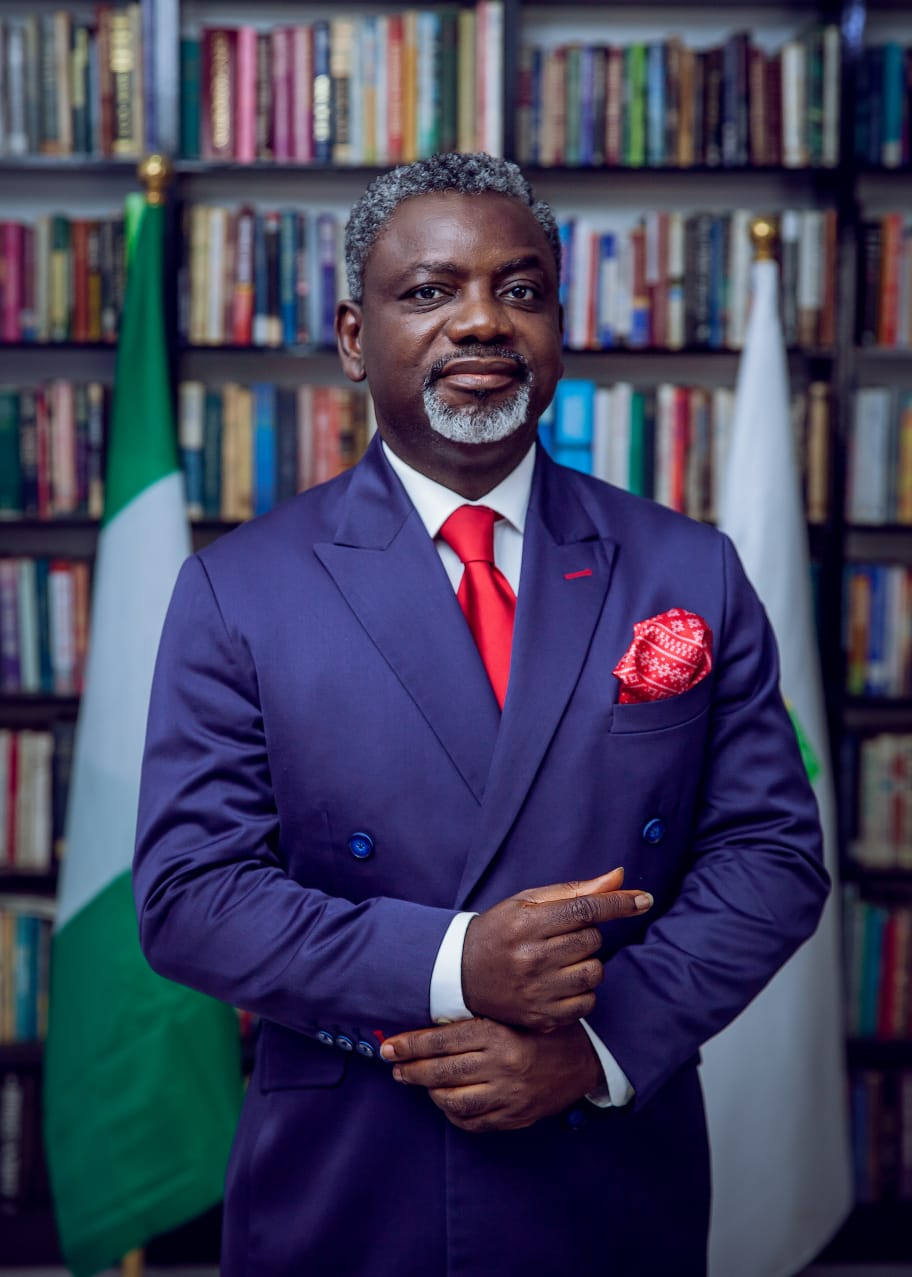
- Education: Imo State University
- Occupations: Leadership expert, Entrepreneur
- Years active: 2008–present
- Known for: Founder Of Guardian of the Nation International

Linus Chinedu Okorie MFR (born 1974) is a Nigerian leadership consultant, author, and founder of Guardians of the Nation International (GOTNI), a nonprofit leadership development organization which has trained and nurtured elected officials and the general public on effective leadership for the last 25 years. In 2022, he received the Nigerian national honor of Member of the Order of the Federal Republic (MFR) and 2019 Imo State Gubernatorial candidate under the Young Progressives Party.

== Early life and education ==
Okorie was born and raised in Kumba, Cameroon, but hails from Egbuoma in Oguta LGA of Imo State, Nigeria. He studied History and International Relations at Imo State University, Owerri where he became the first elected Students' Union president in 2005 and holds a master's degree on Organizational Leadership from Regent University.

== Recognition and awards ==
Okorie was decorated with Nigeria's National Honour Medal of the Member of the Order of the Federal Republic (MFR) by President Muhammadu Buhari in recognition of his contributions to the advancement of leadership in Nigeria. He was awarded the honor alongside Ngozi Okonjo-Iweala, Amina Mohammed, Herbert Wigwe, Chimamanda Ngozi Adichie, amongst others.

He was listed on Africa Icons list of the 2023 100 Most Notable Peace Icons and in 2023 received the Excellence in Leadership Development Award by the National Daily Newspaper.
