= Executive Council of Imo State =

The Imo State Executive Council (also known as the Cabinet of Imo State) is the highest formal governmental body that plays important roles in the Government of Imo State headed by the Governor of Imo State. It consists of the Deputy Governor, Secretary to the State Government, Chief of Staff, Head of Service and Commissioners who preside over ministerial departments along with the Governor's special aides.

== Functions ==
The Executive Council exists to advise and direct the Governor. Their appointment as members of the Executive Council gives them the authority to execute power over their fields.

== Current cabinet ==
The current Executive Council is serving under the Hope Uzodinma's administration.

=== Principal Officers ===
Office	Incumbent
Governor	Senator Hope Uzodinma
Deputy Governor	Dr. Chinyere Ekomaru
Secretary to the State Government	Chief Cosmas Iwu
Chief of Staff	Nnamdi Anyaehie
Head of Service	Dr Caminus Chibuzor Iwuagwu
Deputy Chief of Staff	Chima Nwanna
Principal Secretary to the Governor	Dr(Mrs) Irene Chima

=== Commissioners ===
Office	Incumbent
Commissioner for Justice and Attorney General	Mr C.O.C Akaolisa (Orsu LGA)
Commissioner for Information & Strategy	Mr Declan Emelumba (Oru West LGA)
Commissioner for Health	Dr. Chioma Vivian Egu (Ngor Okpala LGA)
Commissioner for Environment	Dr Iyke Njoku (Aboh Mbaise)
Commissioner for Education	Prof. B. T. O. Ikegwuoha (Orlu LGA)
Commissioner for Special Duties	Mr Francis Dibiagwu (Oguta LGA)
Commissioner for Tourism and Creative Arts	Mr Doris Akubuo (Njaba LGA)
Commissioner for Youths and Social Development	Mr Daniel Oguh (Okigwe LGA)
Commissioner for Entrepreneurship and Skills Acquisition	Mr Noble Atulegwu (Owerri West LGA)
Commissioner for Budget and Economic Planning.	Mr. Christopher Osuala (Nwangele LGA)
Commissioner for Agriculture and Natural Resources	Mr Lambert Orisakwe (Isu LGA)
Commissioner for Livestock Development	Mrs Obiageri Ajoku (Ohaji Egbema LGA)
Commissioner for Gender and Vulnerable Group	Mrs Nkechi Ugwu (Ideato South LGA)
Commissioner for Special Projects	Mr Kingsley Ononuju (Mbaitolu LGA)
Commissioner for Commerce and Industry	Mr Simon Ebegbulem (Ihitte Iboma LGA)
Commissioner for Lands	Mr Enyinnaya Onuegbu (Ngor Okpala LGA)
Commissioner for Transport	Mr Rex Anunobi (Nkwerre LGA)
Commissioner for Works	Mr Raph Nwosu (Oru West LGA)
Commissioner for International Affairs	Mr Fabian Ihekwueme (Obowo LGA)
Commissioner for Ministry of Public Utilities	Mr Tony Umezuruike (Owerri North LGA)
Commissioner for Ministry of Technology Development	Mr Iyke Umeh (Ideato North LG)
Commissioner for Ministry of Social Welfare and Sanitation	Dr Elias Martins Emedom
Commissioner for Housing	Love Ineh (Obowo LGA)
