= Prince Madumere =

Nigerian politician (born 1964)

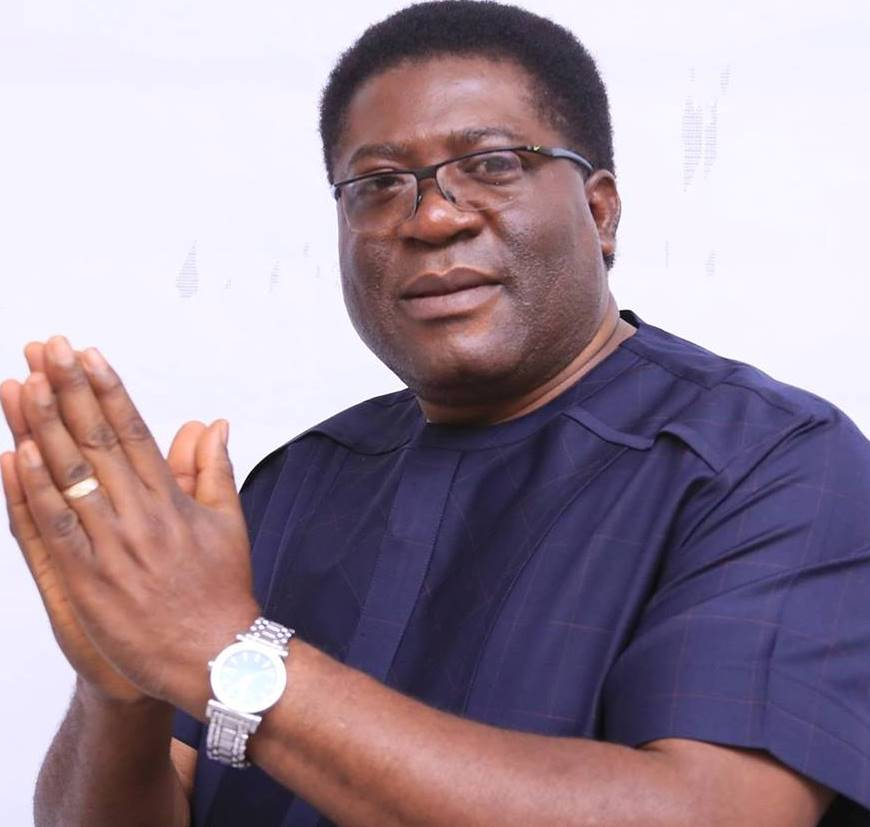
Prince Eze Madumere mfr (kSC)

Prince Ezeakonobi Madumere (born 4 July 1964) is an entrepreneur, management consultant and administrator. He was sworn in as deputy governor after the impeachment of the former deputy governor Sir Jude Agbaso by the Imo House of Assembly.

== Early life and education ==
Madumere was born in Port Harcourt, Rivers State with family roots in Mbaitoli, Imo State, Nigeria. He is the third among seven children of his parents HRH Eze Henry Anoruo Madumere and Ugoeze Malinda Madumere. He attended Primary and Secondary Education in, Owerri and Lagos state respectively after which he travelled to the United States of America where he studied management in San Jacinto College, Houston, Texas, and later on University of Houston and Texas Southern University to study business management and played American college football as outside linebacker for the University of Houston. He is a holder of master's degree in History and International Studies from Imo State University, while currently pursuing his Doctorate Degree in History and International Studies also in Imo State University, Owerri, Imo State.

== Business career ==
Madumere worked at KFC and PepsiCo in the United States for thirteen years. He has managed businesses in aviation, general trading, and owned a chain of men beauty centers. As a management consultant, Madumere is a fellow of the following professional bodies: Nigerian Institute of Management, Nigeria Institute of Strategic Management, Nigeria Institute of Administrators, African Business School, and Corporate Institute of Administrators, Nigeria.

== Political career ==
During the 1998 gubernatorial elections in Nigeria, Madumere went back to Nigeria and served as director for Women and Youth Mobilization for Owelle Rochas Okorocha's campaign in Imo State under the Peoples Democratic Party (PDP). He also served as chief strategist on media and logistics for Okorocha's presidential bid under the ANPP in 2002–2003. He once worked in the presidency as the chief of staff to the presidential adviser on inter-party relations. On December 3, 2005, he ran for the Senate seat in Imo East Senatorial District (Owerri Zone) after it was declared vacant following the death of Senator Amah Iwuagwu. After the 2011 election, where Okorocha emerged victorious as the Governor of Imo State, Prince Ezeakonobi Madumere (MFR) was appointed the chief of staff to the Governor of Imo State. Madumere became deputy governor on 30 March 2013.

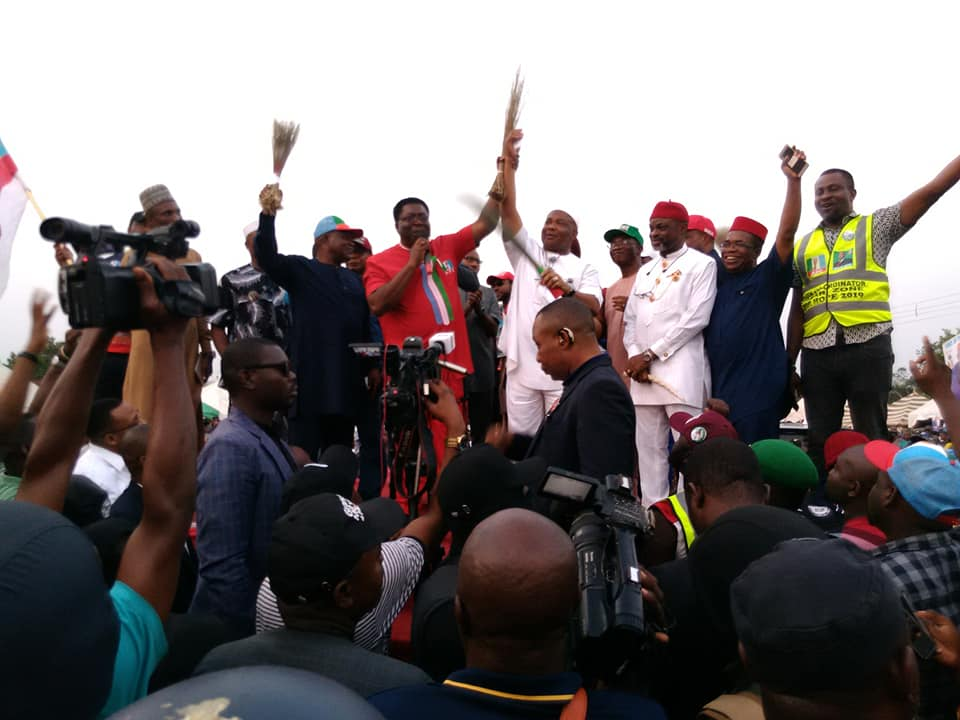
Prince Eze Madumere, leader of All Progressives Congress raising candidate's hand during a rally

On the eve of 2011 Governorship election, Prince Eze Madumere was detentained for about a week at the Imo State Police Command Headquarters, Owerri for refusing to betray his boss and releasing strategic information of the Rescue Mission Campaign Organization.

A legal process was initiated alleging that Madumere had led a group of undisclosed persons to throw sachet water at the convoy of former President Olusegun Obasanjo and the then Governor of Imo state, Chief Ikedi Ohakim. Thereafter, Prince Ezeakonobi was whisked to Owerri Prisons, awaiting trial for about a month at the time the Imo Rescue Mission was holding the grand finale rally in Owerri. It took the efforts of Nigerian civil society, their international counterparts, and the media to secure his release. It was in appreciation of this sacrifice, to ensure that people's will was not scuttled, that the President of Nigeria Goodluck Jonathan was honoured with one of the highest national honours, Member of the order of the Federal Republic (MFR). (ref: 'I have forgiven those who put me in jail on NAIJA247 NEWS By Babatunde Akinsola - Jul 17, 2014, ).

As the Deputy Governor of Imo State, Madumere improved security and resolved disputes. He also worked with banks and international agencies to develop Imo State.

In 2018, Madumere disagreed with Okorocha. After appealing for Okorocha to rescind his decisions, on February 25, 2018, Madumere confronted his estranged boss. One critical issue was Okorocha's appointing his son-in-law, Uche Nwosu, as his successor, which Madumere disagreed with. Madumere also opposed the demolition of business premises and the poor quality of roads, which would collapse in the rainy season. Madumere also described the recklessness in administering the state where civil servants were totally bundled out of their statutory functions, giving room for large scale corruption and financial impropriety. Okorocha and Imo lawmakers sponsored Madumere's impeachment. See Punch, July 10, 2018(ref: I'm not an ex-convict, Madumere replies Imo lawmakers); (Punch, August 5, 2018: "Okorocha hired lawmakers to remove deputy – Ex- Justice commissioner),

After six failed attempts to remove Madumere from office, following difficulty in finding an impeachable offence against him, on phoney claims, there was a seventh attempt, where Imo House of Assembly led by Acho Ihim purportedly claimed it removed Madumere from office despite a subsisting court order by the Imo High Court. Finally, on September 25, 2018, the court nullified the purported impeachment of Madumere as the Deputy Governor of Imo State, declaring it null and void. ref: Channels Television, September 25, 2018: Court Nullifies Imo Deputy Governor's Impeachment). Also see Punch, Sept. 26: Jubilation as Court nullifies Imo Deputy Governor's impeachment etal.

Community Work/Charity

Prince Eze Madumere is married with children and has been a member of the Red Cross Society for many years. He has served as a two term chairman of the society in Imo State Branch, financed the organization, and donated two ambulances. He was involved in a rescue operation during flooding in the riverine areas of the state in 2015 and 2018 respectively. He has also led a team of Red Cross members at various occasions to rescue accident victims where they were evacuated to the government owned hospitals for treatment.

Madumere runs an annual football competition, established a football academy, and hosted a track and field competition. He also supported Heartland FC of Owerri, Imo State.
