= Osakwe Modestus =

Nigerian politician

Osakwe Abiazie Modestus

Member of the Imo State House of Assembly
- Constituency: Isu Constituency

Personal details
- Born: Imo State, Nigeria
- Party: Peoples Democratic Party (PDP)
- Occupation: Politician

Osakwe Abiazie Modestus is a Nigerian politician who currently serves as the representative for the Isu constituency at the Imo State House of Assembly.
