= Vitalis Azodo =

Nigerian politician

Member of the Imo State House of Assembly
- Constituency: Ideato South Constituency

Personal details
- Born: Imo State, Nigeria
- Party: Accord Party
- Occupation: Politician

Vitalis Azodo is a Nigerian politician who currently serves as the representative for the Ideato South constituency at the Imo State House of Assembly.
