= Placid Njoku =

Nigerian politician and professor (born 1947)

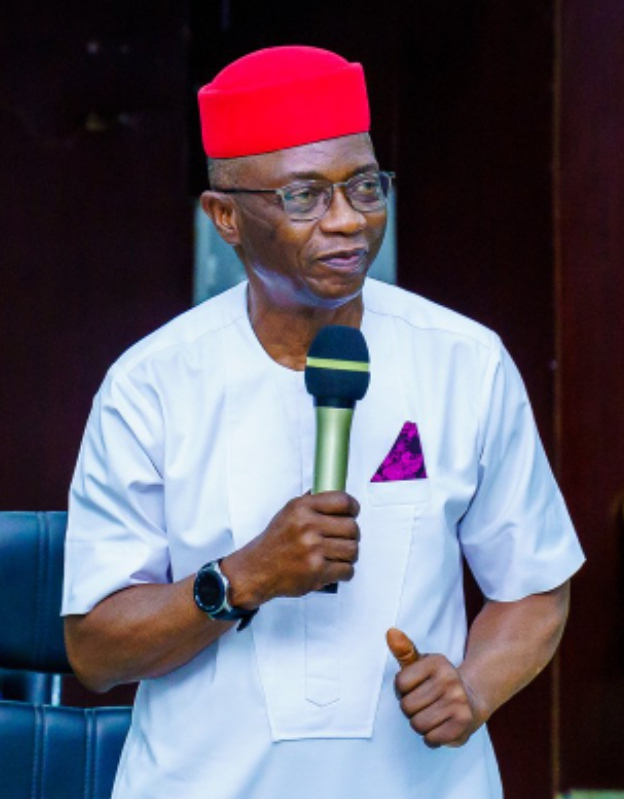

Deputy Governor of Imo State
- In office 15 January 2020 – 15 January 2024
- Governor: Hope Uzodinma
- Preceded by: Gerald Iroha
- Succeeded by: Chinyere Ekomaru

Vice Chancellor of Michael Okpara University of Agriculture
- In office 1993–1999

Personal details
- Born: 10 February 1947 (age 79)
- Party: All Progressives Congress
- Education: Michael Okpara University of Agriculture
- Occupation: Politician; professor; academic

Placid Njoku(born 10 February 1947) is a Nigerian professor and politician who served as the deputy governor of Imo State from 2020 to 2024. He assumed office alongside his running mate Hope Uzodimma (the governor) by the verdict of the Supreme Court annulling the election of incumbent Emeka Ihedioha. Njoku earlier served as the first Vice-Chancellor of Michael Okpara University of Agriculture in Abia State.

== First years ==
He is a native of Ikeduru LGA in Owerri, Imo State. Njoku went and graduated from Michael Okpara University of Agriculture, Abia State and he later worked in the institution and emerged as the first Vice Chancellor of the University. He gained prominence from there.

== Politics ==
Placid Njoku was chosen as a running-mate by Hope Uzodimma amongst four other candidates in the Imo State APC.
