= Itu, Imo State =

Community in Ezinihitte Mbaise Local Government Area of Imo State

Coordinates: 5.464°N 7.331°E

Itu is a community in Ezinihitte Mbaise Local Government Area of Imo State. Most people refer to it as Itu Mbaise. This is because there is another town known as Itu in Cross River State. Itu is a town known for palm wine production business, palm oil and agricultural produce. Politically, It is the heart of Ezinihitte Local Government since it has the LGA headquarters situated in Itu. Itu is a town made up of 10 villages, and is sometimes called “Itu Ama iri”, because of the 10 villages that make up Itu.

They have their community market which is generally referred to as "Eke Itu market". Itu community is at the centre of every other communities in Ezinihitte Mbaise local government area. Most political and sports activities uniting Ezinihitte Mbaise communities are being organised at Itu community because of her centrality. Also, most of the government offices such as: Customary court, Divisional police station, Ezinihitte Mbaise general health center, etc., are sited at Itu community. Itu Ezinihitte Mbaise has boundaries with; Ókpofe from the north, Eziudo from the west, Amumara from the East, and from the south it has river boundary with Ngwa in Abia. All these neighbouring communities except Ngwa, are linked and connected to other communities in Ezinihitte Mbaise local government area. The popular "Nkwo Mbaise market", is located at the boundary of, Itu community, Eziudo community, Amumara community and Ókpofe community.
