= Amakohia =

Village in Imo state, Nigeria

Coordinates: 5°32′43″N 7°10′23″E

Amakohia is the name of four different villages in southeastern Nigeria, all located in and near the city of Owerri and Ikeduru local government area of Imo State.

== Origin ==
Amakohia is one of the towns in Ikeduru Local Government council in Imo State.
