= Amaimo =

Coordinates: 5°34′0″N 7°11′0″E

Amaimo is an autonomous rural town located in Imo State, southeastern Nigeria. It is located near the city of Owerri. Amaimo is located in the North East of Ikeduru Local Government Area. It is bounded on the North by Ehime in Mbano LGA, on the South and East by Ugiri-Ike and Ahiazu in Mbaise; on the North-West by Inyishi and Eziama in Ikeduru Local Government Area, and on the South-West by Amakaohia Ikeduru. Amaimo was ruled by the great late Eze Apollos Anyaso
