= Abazu, Myanmar =

Abazu
- Location in Myanmar
- Coordinates: 17°37′N 96°44′E
- Country: Myanmar
- Division: Bago Division

Population (2005)
  - Religions: Buddhism
- Time zone: UTC+6.30 (MST)

Abazu is a village in the Bago Region of south-east Myanmar. It is located approximately 35 kilometres (22 mi) north-east of Bago.

== See also ==
- List of cities and largest towns in Myanmar
