= Akabo =

Village in Imo state, Nigeria

Coordinates: 05°33′02″N 007°03′59″E

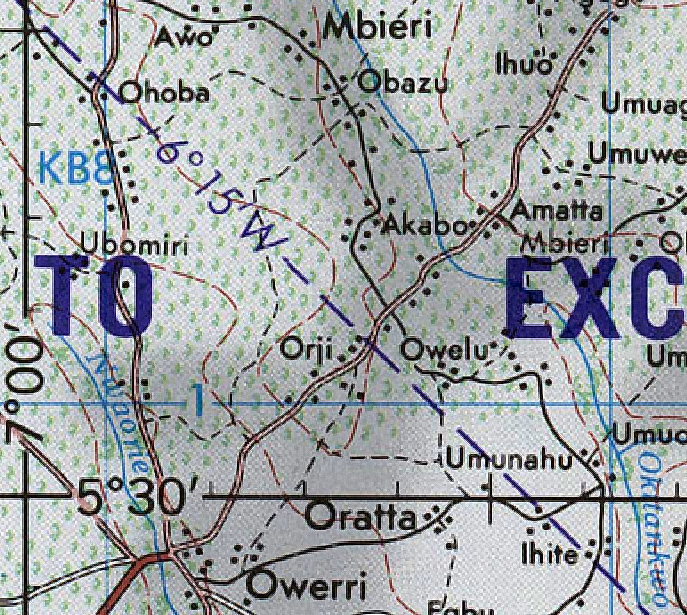
Map showing local area around Akabo (1975)

Akabo is a village complex in the Ikeduru Local Government Area of Imo State, Nigeria, West Africa. A village with this same name is also found in Nnewi and Oguta, all in Igboland.

== Geography ==
Akabo lies on the west bank of the Okitankwo River, about 10 kilometres (6.2 mi) northeast of the state capital of Owerri, but about 20 km by road. It shares borders with towns like Mbieri to the north, Iho and Uzoagba to the northeast, Amatta to the east, Orji to the south, and Ubomiri to the west. The major villages of Akabo are Umunnemoche, Amukachi, Amii, Umuiyi, Umuebem, Umuekpere, Amuzu, and Obiudo.
