= Abazu-Akabo =

Abazu
- Autonomous Community
- Nickname: Pride of Ikeduru
- Location within Nigeria
- Coordinates: 5°33′32.12″N 7°5′40.53″E
- Country: Nigeria
- State: Imo State
- Currency and Currency Code: Naira - NGN
- language: Igbo language
- Headquarters/Village Square: Amaudara

Government
  - Eze: Oliver Njoku (Abazuma II)
- Time zone: UTC+1 (WAT)
- Postcode: 461102
- Website: http://abazuikeduru.brinkster.net

Abazu is an autonomous community in Ikeduru Local Government Area of Imo State, Nigeria. It comprises three main villages and several kindreds and clans. The villages that make up Abazu are Umunnemoche, Ebem na Azu, and Ekpere na Oroka. The Village Square of Abazu is located at Amaudara.

== Location and Geography ==
Abazu is an autonomous community in southeastern Nigeria. Abazu is located along Owerri - Okigwe expressway. It has a latitude of 5.558922 and a longitude of 7.094592. It has a border with Akabo, Uzoagba, and Amatta.
