= Alphonsus Gerald Irona =

Nigerian politician

Alphonsus Gerald Irona is a Nigerian politician who served as deputy governor of Imo state between May 29, 2019 and January 14, 2020.
