= Amatta =

Coordinates: 5°33′N 7°05′E

Amatta Autonomous Community
- LGA
- Nickname: MBAIKE
- Motto: Onye ahala nwanne
- Interactive map of Amatta Autonomous Community
- Country: Nigeria
- State: Imo State
- Time zone: UTC+1 (WAT)
- Postal code: 461102

Amatta is an autonomous community in Imo State south eastern Nigeria. It is located about 4 km northeast of Owerri.

Amatta is one of the 29 towns in Ikeduru Local Government of Imo State. It comprises three major villages: Umuohia, Umuezekom, and Obinnekele. Umuezekom comprises three clans - Ndiuhu, Ebikoro Umuadam, and Umuonyerimma. Obinnekele is made up of Uhu-na-Okwu, Umuikuku and Umunzeagwu. These villages in the order of listing are sons of the same ancestry of which Umuohia is the eldest, of the community and sits right at the center of Amatta.

Amatta people are predominantly Christians, the St Michael's Anglican church Amatta was built in 1917, followed by The St Francis Catholic church Amatta. The community has two primary schools namely primary school Amatta, community school Amatta and Amatta community secondary school, and three vocational schools.

On Nkwo market day, The Community head HRH. Eze Oha Kwere II John Onuekwusi and the Aladinma Women Heads made a bylaw for the community women to so and sell their goods at the marketplace to keep the ancestry community market functional. (Nkwomutaozuo) is located in Umuezekom where it has come boundary with Akabo and Uzoagba communities and also the Community Primary School.
