= Owerri Municipal =

- LGA
- Interactive map of Owerri Municipal
- Country: Nigeria
- State: Imo State

Government
  - Local Government Chairman: Chidiebere Emereibe

Area
  - Total: 58 km^{2} (22 sq mi)

Population (2006)
  - Total: 127,213
  - Density: 2,200/km^{2} (5,700/sq mi)
- Time zone: UTC+1 (WAT)
- Postal code: 460

Owerri Municipal is a Local Government Area in Imo State, Nigeria. Its headquarters is in the city of Owerri. It has an area of 58 km^{2} (22 sq mi) and a population of 127,213 according to the 2006 census. The postal code of the area is 460. Owerri city sits at the intersection of roads from Port Harcourt, Onitsha, Aba, Orlu, Okigwe and Umuahia. It is also the trade center for palm products, corn [maize], yams and cassava [manioc]. Eke Ukwu Owere market is the main market in Owerri Municipal.

== History ==
Before the advent of the British in 1901–1902, Owere town (anglicized Owerri) was and still is today made up of five villages namely – Umuororonjo, Amawom, Umuonyeche, Umuodu and Umuoyima (collectively known as Owerri Nchi Ise). Historically, the indigenes of Owerri trace their ancestry to a man called Ekwem Arugo. With British influence and colonization in the early 1900s Owerri town was the headquarters for Owerri Division and later old Owerri Province. Also, when Imo State was created on 3 February 1976, Owerri city was chosen as its capital. On 15 December 1996 Owerri city attained municipal status.

== Traditional ruler ==
The traditional ruler is the Eze of Owerri. The recent past Eze was H.R.M. Emmanuel Emenyonu Njemanze (Ozuruigbo V), who died May 4, 2016.

== People and culture ==
The Eze is assisted by village heads (each representing a village in Owerri Nchi Ise); altogether they form the "Eze in Council" and help manage the affairs of the town.

Every year the indigenes of Owerri celebrate a festival called "Oru Owere" which is also known as "Oru Eze" (the king's festival). It usually spans between the month of June to mid August. According to tradition, the actual date of commencement is determined by the Oha Owere. It is a period of peace where disputes are easily settled without a third party intervention. During this period of togetherness Owerri indigenes celebrate its founding. The festival kicks off at Ugwu Ekwema (Ekwema's hill) 'Community Civic Center' after the breaking of kola nuts by the Eze Owere.

Foods usually eaten during this period are roasted old yam with oil bean salad and corn porridge meal, signifying the first meal the founding father of Owere ate upon arrival at the present day Owere. People from far and wide come to the city to witness this occasion and celebrate with the indigenes.

Oru Owere is not new yam festival. The indigenes of Owerri do not celebrate the new yam.

== Elders Council ==
Within the municipality, the Elders Council is called "Oha Owere". These elders mediate in disputes over land and housing matters. In accordance with Owere tradition, from each kindred only one person emerges as an Oha. When an Oha council member dies, the next person following by age takes up the position as an Oha, and is thereafter initiated into the Oha Owere Council. The appointment of an Oha according to Owere tradition is a divine appointment, hereditary, non-contestable and does not rotate, just as the village headships, and paramount rulership within Owerri Municipal.

== Notable people ==
- Eze Emmanuel Emenyonu Njemanze (Ozuruigbo V) (late)
- Chief Dennis Dike, Village Head - Amawom
- Chief T.O.S. Oparaugo, Village Head - Umuororonjo
- Chief Herbert Mere, Village Head - Umuonyeche
- Chief Ikefuaku Anozie Emeto, Village Head - Umuodu
- Chief Cyril Ukaebgu, Village Head - Umuoyima
- Eze Alexius Anumaku Njemanze (Ozuruigbo IV) (late)
- Chief Onwuagwumba Eke, (Traditional Chief Priest/Onye isi ala Owere)
- Oha Boniface Anukam, (Head of the Oha Owere)
- Oha Shedrack Obicheozo
