= Chinyere Ekomaru =

Deputy Governor Imo State

Her Excellency Chinyere Ekomaru

Deputy Governor of Imo State
- Incumbent
- Assumed office 15 January 2024
- Governor: Hope Uzodinma
- Preceded by: Placid Njoku

Personal details
- Born: 31 May 1972 (age 54) NIgeria
- Party: All Progressive Congress
- Profession: Politician

Chinyere Ihuoma Ekomaru (born 31 May 1972) is a Nigerian politician who has served as the deputy governor of Imo State since 2024. She was elected deputy governor alongside Governor Hope Uzodinma during the 2023 election.

She was chosen as his running mate succeeding Placid Njoku.
