= Ikeduru =

- LGA
- Motto(s): love peace and progress
- Interactive map of Ikeduru
- Country: Nigeria
- State: Imo State
- Capital: Ihuo

Government
  - Local Government Chairman: Justice Nze
- Time zone: UTC+1 (WAT)

Ikeduru Local Government Area (LGA) is located in the western part of Imo State, in southern Nigeria, West Africa. It was created out of the Mbaitolu/Ikeduru LGA. It has its headquarters at Iho (Ihuo). The current chairman of the Ikeduru LGA is Hon. Justice Nze. Ikeduru LGA has the following neighbors, Owerri North, Mbano, and Mbaise, and they share a common culture.

== Climate ==
With an annual temperature of 29.36 °C (84.85 °F), 0.1% lower than the national average for Nigeria, the district of Ikeduru has a tropical wet and dry climate.

== Farming ==
Ikeduru people are known for their significant palm oil production, and serves as a centre for palm oil processing, marketing, and entrepreneurship. Studies have analyzed the marketing efficiency and allocative efficiency of palm oil processing mills in the area, and it is a common source for producers and suppliers of high-quality, pure palm oil. Palm oil is a major agricultural product in Ikeduru, with a history of production from the earliest times to the present in Owalla Avuvu ikeduru in Imo State.

== Towns and villages ==
- Abazu
- Akabo
- Amaimo
- Amakohia
- Owu Amakohia
- Amatta
- Avuvu
- Atta
- Eziama
- Ikembara
- Inyishi
- Iho
- Ngugo
- Okwu
- Ugiri
- Umudim
- Uzoagba

== Notable Places ==
Ikeduru boasts a standard healthcare system in South East Nigeria. The American Cancer Hospital, a subsidiary of Imo International Health Systems, is located within the Ikeduru Hospital Complex at KM 13, Owerri-Okigwe road, Iho, Ikeduru LGA, Imo State

== Notable people ==
- Placid Njoku
- Emmanuel Iwuanyanwu
- Samuel Anyanwu
