= Hope Uzodimma =

Nigerian politician (born 1958)

His Excellency Hope Uzodimma

Governor of Imo State
- Incumbent
- Assumed office 15 January 2020
- Deputy: Placid Njoku (2020–2024); Chinyere Ekomaru (since 2024)
- Preceded by: Emeka Ihedioha

Senator for Imo West
- In office 6 June 2011 – 9 June 2019
- Preceded by: Osita Izunaso
- Succeeded by: Rochas Okorocha

Personal details
- Born: Hope Odidika Uzodimma; 12 December 1958 (age 67) Omuma, Eastern Region, British Nigeria (now in Imo State, Nigeria)
- Party: All Progressives Congress (2018–present)
- Other political affiliations: National Party of Nigeria (until 1983); United Nigeria Congress Party (1997–1998); Alliance for Democracy (2002–2003); Peoples Democratic Party (1999–2002; 2003–2018)
- Spouse: Chioma Uzodimma
- Education: Federal University of Technology Owerri
- Occupation: Politician

Hope Odidika Uzodimma (born 12 December 1958) is a Nigerian politician who has served as the governor of Imo State since 2020. On 14 January 2020, the Supreme Court of Nigeria declared Uzodimma of the All Progressives Congress (APC) winner of the 2019 governorship poll in Imo State, nullifying the election of the then-incumbent governor Emeka Ihedioha.

== Origin ==
Hope Uzodimma was born on 12 December 1958 in Omuma to an Igbo Catholic family; his father Chief Michael Uzodimma held the chieftaincy title of Igwe of Ozuh Omuma and his mother was Ezinne Rose Uzodimma (née Nneoha). He is a kinsman of the Okoro family of Etiti-Omuma. Uzodimma is a devout Catholic, and he is married to Chioma Uzodimma with seven children.

Uzodimma attended Mgbidi Secondary School in Omumu, Oru West, Imo State, Nigeria, for his secondary education.

He enrolled in college in 1978 and studied international studies there until 1982 when he received his bachelor's degree. He had already earned an advanced diploma in transport studies before this.

In May 2024, he delivered the 52nd Convocation Lecture at the University of Nigeria, Nsukka.

In December 2024, the Federal University of Technology, Owerri (FUTO) conferred on him an Honorary Doctorate in Management (Honoris Causa) at its 36th Convocation, citing his contributions to national development and support for the university.

== Early political career ==
Uzodimma began his political career during the Second Nigerian Republic, joining the ruling National Party of Nigeria (NPN), where in 1983, he became the Imo State youth leader. In the 1990s, with the aborted transition to the Third Nigerian Republic, Uzodimma featured prominently as a member of the United Nigeria Congress Party.

In 1999, after the return to democracy, Uzodimma joined the Peoples Democratic Party (PDP), where he served as a member of the party's National Caucus, National Executive Committee and on the Board of Trustees, at various times between 1999 and 2017. As a party boss in Imo State, Uzodimma was a close associate of the Governor Achike Udenwa until late 2002, when ahead of the April 2003 elections he decamped to the Alliance for Democracy (AD), becoming the party's candidate for the Imo State gubernatorial election. After losing the election to Udenwa, he returned to the PDP in February 2004. He later contested the PDP governorship primaries in December 2006, coming in second to Senator Ifeanyi Araraume. In 2011, after the incumbent Governor Ikedi Ohakim joined the PDP, Uzodimma endorsed him to run for a second term as Governor of Imo State, favoring him over Rochas Okorocha who he later won.

In January 2011, Uzodimma won the PDP senatorial primary for the Imo West, gaining 2,147 votes, while the incumbent Senator Osita Izunaso came second with 891 votes. Uzodimma was later disqualified by a federal high court judgment as he had not been cleared by the PDP electoral panel led by Nwafor-Orizu. In March 2011, a court of appeal issued a stay of execution while the case was being decided, leaving Uzodimma free to campaign. On 5 April 2011 the Court of Appeal upheld the federal high court judgement, Uzodimma later appealed this decision at the Supreme Court. In the April 2011 elections, Uzodimma received 85,042 votes, ahead of former Governor Achike Udenwa of the Action Congress of Nigeria (ACN) with 64,228 votes and Rajis Okpalan Benedicta of the All Progressives Grand Alliance with 57,110 votes. In May 2011, the Supreme Court overturned the earlier decisions and declared that Uzodimma was the valid candidate and therefore had been elected.

== Senate (2011–2019) ==
On 6 June 2011, Uzodimma was sworn in as a Senator of the Federal Republic of Nigeria, representing Imo West Senatorial District of Imo State. He was re-elected for a second term in the Senate during the 2015 election. In 2018, he left the Peoples Democratic Party and joined the ruling All Progressives Congress (APC) in order to contest for governor of Imo State in the 2019 gubernatorial elections.

== Governor of Imo State ==
In March 2019, the Independent National Electoral Commission sitting in Imo announced the governorship election results of Imo State: Emeka Ihedioha of the PDP who won with 273,404 votes, Uche Nwosu of Action Alliance with 190,364 votes, Ifeanyi Ararume of the All Progressives Grand Alliance with 114,676 votes; and Uzodimma in fourth place with 96,458 votes. Uzodimma later challenged the victory of Ihedioha up to the Supreme Court. On 14 January 2020, the Supreme Court declared Uzodimma the duly elected Governor of Imo State. The court held that results from 388 polling units were wrongly excluded from votes ascribed to Uzodimma and the APC in Imo adding that the first appellant Uzodimma holds the majority of lawful votes cast.

On 15 January 2020, he and Placid Njoku were sworn in as the Governor of Imo State and Deputy Governor of Imo State respectively. In his inaugural address, he ordered the states accountant general to provide a comprehensive financial status for the state from May 2010 to January 2020, he also ordered the permanent secretaries of all ministries in the state to forward the status of all contracts awarded, whilst halting the paying for all ongoing contracts.

On 31 May 2023, Uzodimma emerged as chairman of the Progressive Governors Forum, the umbrella body of governors of the ruling All Progressives Congress (APC), replacing Abubakar Atiku Bagudu, the former governor of Kebbi State with the governor of Kaduna State, Uba Sani as the vice chairman.

In the buildup to his re-election, Uzodinma on 13 August 2023, picked a new running mate, Chinyere Ihuoma Ekomaru for the 2023 Imo State governorship election.

== Awards and nominations ==
He was given the 2017 Personal Life of the Most Outstanding Parliamentarian of the Year by the Nigerian News. In 2022, Governor Hope Uzodimma bagged a peace award from the United Nations for his efforts at promoting inter-ethnic harmony in Nigeria and good governance in the state.

He was nominated for the award by the United Towns Agency (UTA) for North-South Cooperation of the United Nations.

He also bagged The Sun 2021 Governor of the year Award.

Due to his sterling performance since his assumption of office as the governor of Imo State, South East Nigeria, Hope Uzodimma, bagged the prestigious honour of Most Prolific Governor of the Year 2023 by Face of Democracy Nigeria, FDN.

In May 2023, Gov. Uzodimma was conferred with the Grand Service Star of Rivers State (GSSRS) award in recognition for his contribution and commitment to national unity and equity.

Governor Uzodimma also got honoured by the Institute of Chartered Accountants of Nigeria (ICAN) for his outstanding performance in promoting fiscal transparency in governance.

Governor Hope Uzodimma bagged UN peace awards.

In May 2023, he conferred the National honour of Commander of the Order of the Niger by President Muhammadu Buhari.

== Titles ==
Uzodimma had the ceremonial title of Onwa-Netiri Oha of Omuma in Oru East local government of Imo State.

== See also ==
- List of governors of Imo State
