= Rochas Okorocha =

5th governor of Imo State

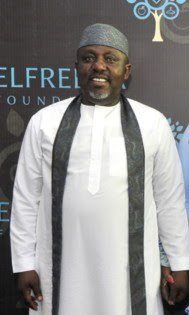
- Okorocha, 2017

Senator of the Federal Republic of Nigeria representing Imo State West District
- In office June 2019 – June 2023
- Preceded by: Hope Uzodinma

5th Governor of Imo State
- In office 29 May 2011 – 29 May 2019
- Deputy: Prince Eze Madumere
- Preceded by: Ikedi Ohakim
- Succeeded by: Chukwuemeka Ihedioha

Personal details
- Born: Rochas Anayo Okorocha; 22 September 1962 (age 64) Ideato South, Imo State, Nigeria
- Party: All Progressives Congress
- Education: Diploma in Public Administration
- Alma mater: University of Jos

Owelle Rochas Anayo Okorocha // (born 22 September 1962) is a Nigerian politician of Igbo extraction, from Imo State. He was the senator representing Imo West senatorial district at the 9th Nigerian Senate. From 2011 to 2019 he served as Governor of Imo State.

== Background ==
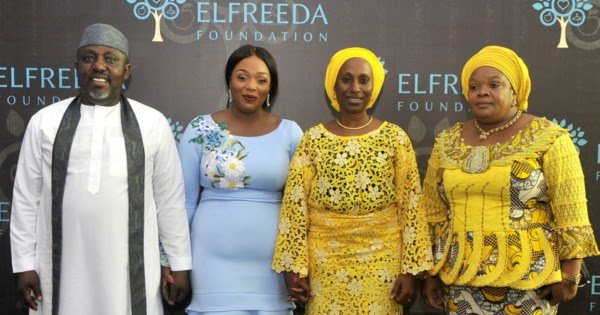
Governor Rochas Okorocha of Imo State, Mrs. Uloma Nwosu (MD House of Freeda), Mrs Dolapo Osinbajo (wife of the Vice President of Nigeria), Mrs Nkechi Okorocha (wife of the Imo State Governor)

Rochas was born on 22 September 1962 in Ogboko, Ideato SouthLocal Government Area of Imo State, Southeast Nigeria.

He attended Juladaco High School in Jos from 1976 to 1981, and from 1990 to 1991 he studied at the University of Uyo, obtaining a diploma in Public Administration. He returned to the university from 1993 to 1994, to obtain an advanced diploma in Public Administration.

His career positions include President, Nigeria Red Cross Society, President/Founder, Rochas Foundation Inc, President, Rochas Group of Companies Limited, Pro-Chancellor, African Business School and Former Chairman, Board of Nigerian Airspace Management Agency.

He is married to Nneoma Nkechi Okorocha, and together they have three daughters and three sons.

Okorocha is a Roman Catholic.

== Early political career ==
Okorocha was a Commissioner on the Federal Character Commission and a Member of the National Constitutional Conference. When democracy was restored in 1999, Rochas Okorocha competed in the primaries to be the People's Democratic Party (PDP) candidate for governor of Imo State but lost to Achike Udenwa.

He moved to the All Nigeria People's Party (ANPP) and ran for the party's presidential nomination but a disappointing result in the primary in 2003 ended his ambition. He returned to the PDP, and President Olusegun Obasanjo appointed him as Special Adviser on Inter-Party affairs.

Rochas Okorocha formed the Action Alliance (AA) party in 2005, planning to become a presidential candidate for the AA in the 2007 elections. He again returned to the PDP, and in September 2007, indicated that he was interested in becoming PDP National Chairman. After Governor Ikedi Ohakim decamped from the Progressive Peoples Alliance (PPA) to the PDP in July 2009, Okorocha denied that Ohakim had taken over the PDP in the state, saying he was named as A leader since he was governor, but a proper PDP congress should be held to decide on policy.

== As Imo State Governor ==
Okorocha decamped from the People's Democratic Party (PDP) to the All Progressives Grand Alliance (APGA), to run as an APGA candidate for Imo State Governor in the April 2011 national elections. A few weeks later, in December 2010, the APGA suspended Okorocha from the party over what it described as anti-party activities pending an investigation of his conduct. It was reported that he had stormed the Imo State Secretariat of APGA with dozens of thugs, who beat up several top officers of the Party. Okorocha and his companions had also threatened the Imo State Chairman and Secretary of APGA.

However, Okorocha went on to campaign as APGA candidate and won subsequently. Rochas in 2013 decamped to the All Progressive Congress.

The Independent National Electoral Commission (INEC) declared that the Imo State gubernatorial elections held on 26 April 2011 were inconclusive since the collation of results was marred by irregularities. The INEC ordered reruns in four local government areas and one ward, to be held on 6 May 2011.

In the event, elections were not held in Oguta Local Government Area due to a security threat.

The final results had Okorocha of the APGA declared winner with 336,859 votes. He was followed by the incumbent governor Ikedi Ohakim of the PDP with 290,490 votes. Former Senator Ifeanyi Araraume of the Action Congress of Nigeria (ACN) was third with 107,068 votes.

President Goodluck Jonathan congratulated Okorocha on his election, saying the people of Imo State had spoken through the ballot box.

INEC declared the 11 April governorship polls in Imo inconclusive, a development that led to the cancellation of elections in more than 250 polling units in 23 of the 27 local government areas. The Resident Electoral Commissioner (REC), Mr. Gabriel Ada, listed the state constituencies affected in the re-run to include; Ikeduru, Isiala Mbano, Isu, Oguta, Owerri West, and Oru East. He explained that the electoral commission ordered re-run for the governorship election because of the 79,000 difference between the votes scored by the leading and the second candidates.

Okorocha won the rerun election fixed for 25 April 2015.

During his time as governor, on one of his television interviews on Channels Television, he used the word "iberiberism" when trying to explain his projects as governor. Iberiberism originates from an Igbo word 'iberibe' meaning stupidity or foolishness. This got him huge attention on media channels. He was present at the 2019 Igbo Day which took place in Owerri, the two-day event started with an award night by the Imo State Government "Governor Rochas Okorocha.

== APC ==
On 2 March 2013, Rochas led an APGA faction to form the All Progressives Congress. He was later elected by his colleague governors in the opposition as Chairman of the Progressive Governors Forum.

Towards the end of his tenure as governor, Okorocha picked his son-in-law Uche Nwosu, who was the Chief of Staff, as his candidate to run for the office of the governor under APC, but Uche Nwosu lost the party's governorship ticket to Senator Hope Uzodinma. Uche Nwosu defected to the Action Alliance (AA) party after his loss and became their governorship flag bearer. On the 1st of March 2019, APC suspended Okorocha along with Amosun for anti-party activities.

He contested the senatorial ticket for the 9th Senate representing Imo west Orlu senatorial zone during the 2019 National Assembly elections however the results are controversial and have not been ratified by INEC.

Despite being declared the winner of Imo west senatorial seat, INEC removed his name from the final list saying that the result was declared under duress. The certificate of return was however issued to him by INEC on 11 June 2019 following the inauguration of the 9th assembly of the Nigerian Senate and declared him the winner of the Imo west senatorial district elections.

Okorocha was sworn in on 13 June 2019 by the Senate President Ahmed Lawan.

Under the auspices of the All Progressive Congress (APC), he contested for the seat of presidency in (2015). He declared his interest to vie for the same office of presidency again under the same umbrella in 2023.

== Awards and honours ==
- 'Leadership par Excellence' Award by The Presbyterian Church of Nigeria.

== See also ==
- List of governors of Imo State
