= Deputy governor of Imo State =

Second highest-ranking official in the executive branch of Imo State in Nigeria

Deputy Governor of Imo State
- Incumbent; Chinyere Ekomaru since 15 January 2024
- Executive Branch of the Government of Imo State
- Style: His Excellency
- Member of: Imo State Executive Council
- Reports to: The Governor
- Seat: Owerri
- Nominator: The gubernatorial candidate
- Term length: four years (renewable once)
- Constituting instrument: Constitution of the Federal Republic of Nigeria
- Website: imostate.gov.ng

The Deputy Governor of Imo State is the political running-mate of the governor. He/she serves as the second highest executive official after the governor. On 15 January 2024, Chinyere Ekomaru was sworn in as Deputy Governor of Imo State.

== Qualifications ==
As seen in the case of the Governor, The deputy Governor is nominated by the gubernatorial candidate of the political party and is expected to have the same qualification as the governor otherwise their election into office would be nullified. The Deputy Governor shall have the following qualifications:

a) Be above 35 years of age

b) Be a citizen of Imo State by birth

c) Be a member of a political party already registered by The Independent National Electoral Commission (INEC)

d) Possess a school Certificate level or its equivalent

== Oath of office ==
The oath of office is administered by the Chief Judge of the State or any Judge appointed to act in his stead. It's the same oath taken by the Vice President of Nigeria and Commissioners serving in the state

I, do solemnly swear/affirm that I will be faithful and bear true allegiance to the Federal Republic of Nigeria; that as Vice-President of the Federal Republic of Nigeria, I will discharge my duties to the best of my ability, faithfully and in accordance with the Constitution of the Federal Republic of Nigeria and the law, and always in the interest of the sovereignty, integrity, solidarity, well-being and prosperity of the Federal Republic of Nigeria; that I will strive to preserve the Fundamental Objectives and Directive Principles of State Policy contained in the Constitution of the Federal Republic of Nigeria; that I will not allow my personal interest to influence my official conduct or my official decisions, that I will to the best of my ability preserve, protect and defend the Constitution of the Federal Republic of Nigeria; that I will abide by the Code of Conduct contained in the Fifth Schedule to the Constitution of the Federal Republic of Nigeria; that in all circumstances, I will do right to all manner of people, according to law, without fear or favour, affection or ill-will; that I will not directly or indirectly communicate or reveal to any person any matter which shall be brought under my consideration or shall become known to me as Vice-President of the Federal Republic of Nigeria. So help me God.

== Duties ==
The Deputy Governor assists the Governor in exercising primary assignments and is also eligible to replace a dead, impeached, absent or ill Governor as required by the 1999 Constitution of the Federal Republic of Nigeria.

== Tenure ==
The Deputy Governor is elected through popular vote on a ticket with the Governor for a term of four years. They may be re-elected for a second term but may not serve for more than two consecutive terms.
