= Uche Nwosu =

Nigerian politician

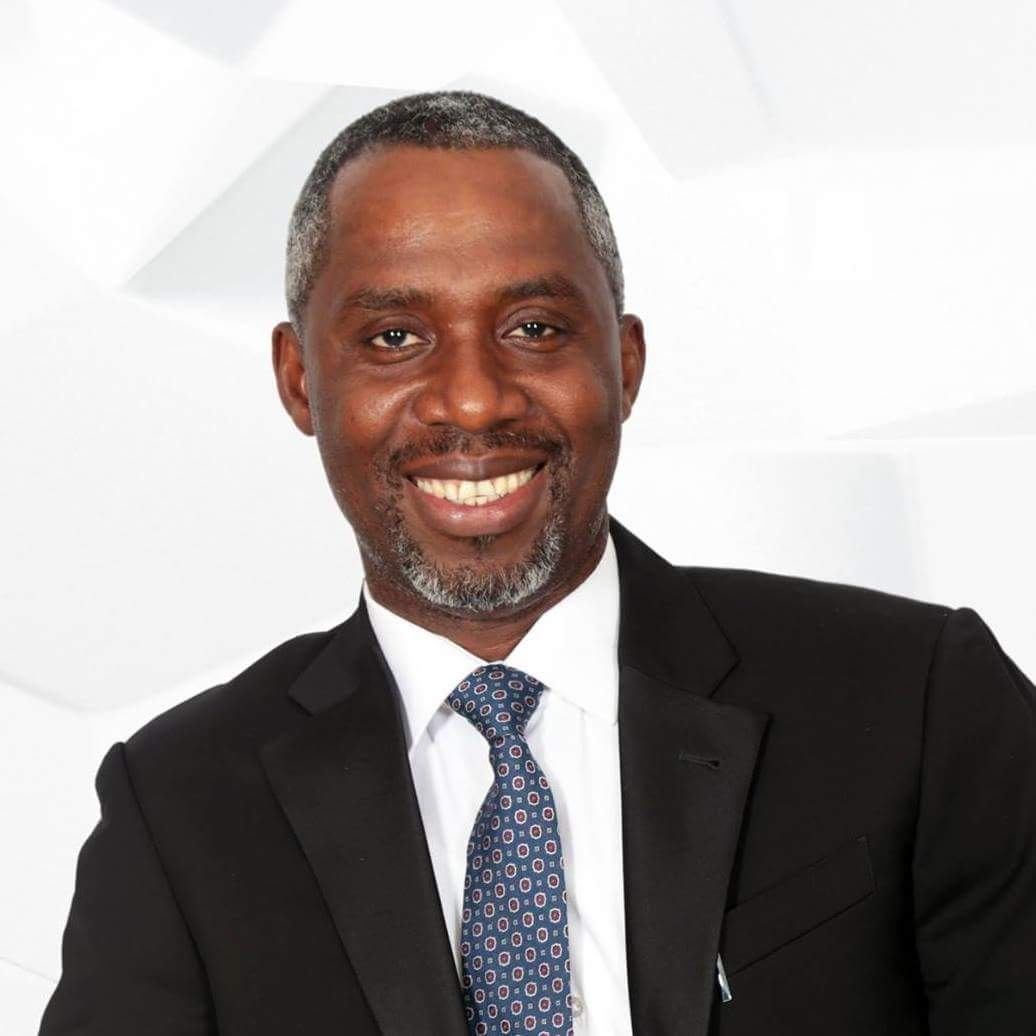
- Ugwumba Uche Nwosu
- Born: Uche Nwosu; 8 August 1975 (age 50)
- Education: Imo State University
- Occupation: Politician
- Spouse: Uloma Nwosu (3 children)
- Website: ugwumbauchenwosu

Uche Nwosu (born August 8, 1975), is a Nigerian politician and former Deputy Chief of Staff to the Imo State Government from 2011 to 2013, Commissioner for Lands from 2013 to 2015 and was the Chief of Staff from 2015 to 2019.

== Early life ==
Nwosu, a son of Umunwokwe, Eziama-Obaire in Nkwerre Local Government Area of Imo State, was born on 8 August 1975 into the family of late Rev. Daniel Nwaobi and Mrs. Jemaimah Nwaou from Umunwokwe, Eziama-Obaire in Nkwerre Local Government Area of Imo State. In 1995, Uchwen secured admission into the Imo State University, Owerri where he read Urban and Regional Planning. He graduated with a B.Sc. second class honours degree.

== Personal life ==
He is married to Uloma, the first daughter of his principal, Rochas Okorocha in January 2013, and they have three sons.

== Political life ==
On 9 March 2019, Nwosu contested for the gubernatorial seat for Imo State under the political platform of Action Alliance Party (AA). On 11 March 2019, Uche Nwosu lost the contest to Chukwuemeka Ihedioha who ran under the political platform of Peoples Democratic Party (PDP). He polled a total of 190,364 votes as against a total of 273,404 votes by Chukwuemeka Ihedioha who was declared the Governor-elect by the Independent National Electoral Commission (INEC).
