= Emeka Ihedioha =

Nigerian politician (born 1965)

Emeka Ihedioha CON
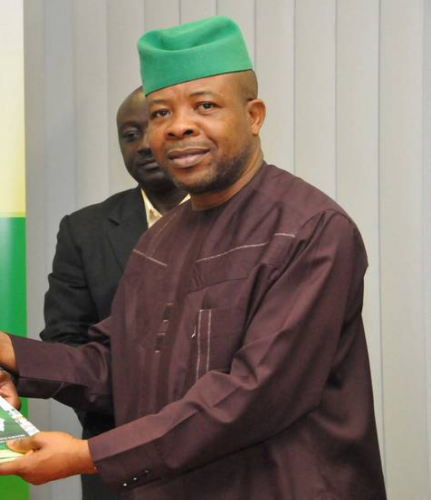

6th Governor of Imo State
- In office 29 May 2019 – 15 January 2020
- Deputy: Gerald Iroha
- Preceded by: Rochas Okorocha
- Succeeded by: Hope Uzodinma

Deputy Speaker of the House of Representatives of Nigeria
- In office 6 June 2011 – 6 June 2015
- Speaker: Aminu Tambuwal
- Preceded by: Usman Bayero Nafada
- Succeeded by: Yusuf Sulaimon Lasun

House Chief Whip
- In office November 2007 – 6 June 2011
- Preceded by: Bethel Amadi
- Succeeded by: Ishaka Mohammed Bawa

Member of the House of Representatives of Nigeria from Imo
- In office 3 June 2003 – 6 June 2015
- Constituency: Aboh Mbaise/Ngor Okpala

Personal details
- Born: 24 March 1965 (age 61) Aboh Mbaise, Eastern Region, Nigeria (now in Imo State)
- Party: African Democratic Congress (since 2025)
- Spouse: Ebere Ihedioha
- Children: 4
- Occupation: Politician; businessman
- Website: emekaihedioha.com.ng

Chukwuemeka Ihedioha (born 24 March 1965) is a Nigerian politician and businessman who served as governor of Imo State from 2019 to 2020. He was removed from office on 14 January 2020, by the Supreme Court of Nigeria which declared the APC candidate (Hope Uzodinma) the authentic winner of the 2019 gubernatorial election. He was deputy speaker of the House of Representatives of Nigeria from 2011 to 2015.

Ihedioha is a member of the African Democratic Congress (ADC) and represented the Aboh Mbaise/Ngor Okpala Federal Constituency of Imo State from 2003 to 2015. He holds a National Honor as Commander of the Order of the Niger (CON).

In 2015, Ihedioha briefly served as acting speaker upon the swearing-in of Aminu Tambuwal as governor of Sokoto State on 29 May 2015.

== Early life ==
Ihedioha was born on 24 March 1965 at Mbutu in Aboh Mbaise Local Government Area in Imo State, South-East Nigeria.

He attended Town School Mbutu in Aboh Mbaise and completed the same at SDA Primary School Abule Oja, Yaba in 1976. He had his secondary education at St. Ephraim's Secondary School, Owerrinta in present-day Abia State. He then proceeded to the University of Lagos, Akoka-Yaba, where he obtained a Bachelor of Science (B.SC) degree in Food Science and Technology, in 1988.

Ihedioha took an executive certificate course in financial management from Stanford University, and a leadership certificate course from Harvard Kennedy School of Government, Harvard University.

== Political career ==
In 1992, Ihedioha was appointed press officer to the Senate President of the Federal Republic of Nigeria, Chief Iyorchia Ayu. A year later he was appointed chief press secretary to the Deputy Senate President. Following a military incursion in the polity in November 1993, Ihedioha returned to his communications practice as Chief Executive Officer of First Page Communications. He became Director of Publicity of the newly formed People's Democratic Movement, the purveyor of the Peoples Democratic Party in 1998.

He was appointed special assistant to the Presidential Adviser on Utilities in July 1999, as a special assistant on media and publicity to the President of the Senate in November 1999, and as a special assistant on political matters to the Vice President in September 2001. He won a seat in the House of Representatives as a member representing Aboh Mbaise-Ngor Okpala Federal Constituency of Imo State in 2003.

He was the deputy speaker of the House of Representatives from 2011 to 2015. During this period, he served as the Speaker of the House of Representatives after Tambuwal's swearing-in as the Executive Governor of Sokoto State.

On 9 March 2019, Ihedioha contested for the gubernatorial seat for Imo State under the political platform of the Peoples Democratic Party (PDP). On 11 March 2019, Ihedioha was declared Governor-elect by the Independent National Electoral Commission (INEC) sitting in Imo State, after he defeated Uche Nwosu (son-in-law of the incumbent governor) who ran under the Action Alliance Party (AA), with a total of 273,404 votes.

He was removed from office on 14 January 2020 by a Supreme Court judgment.

On 23 April 2024, Ihedioha resigned from Peoples Democratic Party (PDP).

== Legislative activities ==
Between 2003 and 2007, he served as Chair of the House Committee on Marine Transport. Ihedioha is credited with passing key bills that allowed for increased participation of Nigeria in that sector. These laws are:

- The International Convention for the Safety at Sea (Ratification and Enforcement) Act 2004
- The International Convention for the Prevention of Pollution from Ships (Ratification and Enforcement) Act 2005
- The United Nations Convention on Carriage of Goods by Sea (Ratification and Enforcement) Act 2005
- The International Convention on the Establishment of an International Fund for the Compensation of Oil Pollution Damage 1979 as amended (Ratification and Enforcement) Act 2006
- The International Convention on the Civil Liabilities for Oil Pollution Damage (Ratification and Enforcement) Act 2006.
- Merchant Shipping Act 2007
- Council for the Regulation of Freight Forwarding in Nigeria Act 2007

Ihedioha was reelected in 2007 and served as Chair of the House Committee on Cooperation and Integration in Africa. He was later elected chief whip of the House, a position he held throughout that term.

== Executive activities ==
As Governor of Imo State, Ihedioha is credited with initiating key policies that enhanced fiscal responsibility in the State. These include:

- The Treasury Single Account (TSA).
- The Central Billing System (CBS).
- The Open Government System (OPS).
- The reactivation of the Bureau for Public Procurement and Price Intelligence.

As a result of his policy measures, the National Bureau for Statistics (NBS) named Imo State as the least corrupt state in Nigeria, with a record low 17.6% corruption prevalence.

Ihedioha is also known for embarking on widespread infrastructural projects, proactive lawmaking, and proposing and enacting/signing 17 laws, within his short period as Governor.

== Personal life ==
Ihedioha's business interests span real estate development, industrialised farming, hospitality, power and petroleum sectors. He is married to Ebere Ihedioha and has four children (three sons and a daughter). Ihedioha is an avid supporter of the Arsenal football club and enjoys travelling and table tennis. He is a philanthropist, particularly within his native Imo state.

== See also ==
- List of governors of Imo State
