= Governor of Imo State =

Political position in Nigeria

- Incumbent; Hope Uzodimma since 15 January 2020
- Executive Branch of the Government of Imo State
- Style: His Excellency / Her Excellency
- Member of: Executive Council of Imo State
- Residence: Imo State Government House, Owerri
- Seat: Owerri
- Appointer: Direct popular election
- Term length: 4 years, renewable once
- Constituting instrument: Constitution of the Federal Republic of Nigeria
- First holder: Samuel Mbakwe
- Deputy: Deputy Governor of Imo State
- Website: imostate.gov.ng

The governor of Imo State is an elective political position, one of the governors of the thirty-six states of Nigeria. The governor of Imo State is the chief executive officer of Imo state and its executive branch with the assistance of the deputy governor (the governor's political running-mate). Fourteen people have served as governor since Imo State was created in 1976: eight military governors, two military administrators and seven democratic governors. The current governor is Hope Uzodinma of the All Progressives Congress, in office since 15 January 2020.

== Duties and functions ==
In their official capacity, governors appoint the principal state officers, commissioners, heads of state ministries, state judicial officers, permanent secretaries and other heads of departments. The governor doesn't belong to the State House of Assembly. The governor oversees all the functions of the Executive cadre of the Government of Imo State.

=== Executive powers ===
Most executive power lies with the governor whose responsibility is to enforce state laws. The governor serves as the head of government with supreme authority over the Executive Council. Excluding the deputy governor, the governor appoints commissioners, heads of government agencies, special advisers and judicial officers subject to the House's approval. The governor has the duty to attract investments, promote business and implement political as well as economic initiatives. In their official capacity, governors also serve as the chief security officer of the State.

=== Legislative powers ===
Under the Constitution, every bill passed by the Imo House of Assembly must be presented to the governor for approval before it becomes law. The governor may choose to sign it and make it law, veto it and return it to the House, or take no action. If the governor vetoes the bill, a two-thirds majority of the House may override it, and the bill will become an act without the governor's signature. If the governor does not act, a bill automatically becomes law after a 30-day period.

=== Judicial powers ===
Judicial officers are appointed by the governor on the recommendation of the National Judicial Council subject to confirmation of the appointment by the Imo State House of Assembly. Should a vacancy arise in the office of the Chief Judge or the President of the Customary Court of Appeal, the governor can appoint the next most senior judge of those courts to act for a period of three months.

Section 212, subsection (1) and (2) further empowers the chief executive to issue pardons and reprieves, commute sentences, or remit fines and forfeitures imposed for the commission of offenses against, or for the violation of the state laws.

== Oath of office ==
The oath of office is administered by the chief judge of the state who is appointed by the governor. The oath of office is carried out on the inaugural day of the new government in the state which is especially on the day of tenure expiration of the preceding government or otherwise stipulated by a Higher Court in Nigeria.

I do solemnly swear that I will be faithful and bear true allegiance to the Federal Republic of Nigeria; that as the Governor of Imo State, I will discharge my duties to the best of my ability, faithfully and in accordance with the Constitution of the Federal Republic of Nigeria and the law, and always in the interest of the sovereignty, integrity, solidarity, well-being and prosperity of the Federal Republic of Nigeria; that I will strive to preserve the fundamental objectives and directive principles of state policy contained in the Constitution of the Federal Republic of Nigeria; that I will exercise the authority vested in me as governor so as not to impede or prejudice the authority lawfully vested in the President of the Federal Republic of Nigeria and so as not to endanger the continuance of federal government in Nigeria; that I will not allow my personal interest to influence my official conduct or my official decisions; that I will to the best of my ability preserve, protect and defend the Constitution of the Federal Republic of Nigeria; that I will abide by the Code of Conduct contained in the Fifty Schedule to the Constitution of the Federal Republic of Nigeria; that in all circumstances, I will do right to all manner of people, according to law, without fear or favour, affection or ill-will; that I will not directly or indirectly communicate or reveal to any person any matter which shall be brought under my consideration or shall become known to me as Governor of Imo State, except as may be required for the due discharge of my duties as governor; and that I will devote myself to the service and well-being of the people of Nigeria. So help me God

== Qualification ==
The governor and deputy governor are directly elected on the same ticket by popular vote for four-year terms, and are limited to two consecutive terms, for a total of eight years. Qualifications required for an individual aspiring to become the governor of Imo State is contained in section 177 of the 1999 Constitution. According to the constitution, an individual meeting the following eligibility criteria may serve as governor. The candidate must be:

a. (35) years of age

b. A citizen of Imo State by birth

c. A member of a political party in Nigeria already registered by the Independent National Electoral Commission (INEC) with an endorsement by that political party.

d. School Certificate educational level or its equivalent

== Removal from office ==
Although a governor is normally elected to serve a complete four-year term during the national elections, in exceptional cases, before a term of such four years expires, the officeholder may be replaced or removed as the case may be, through death, impeachment or if an election is annulled by a "competent" court of law or by a two-thirds majority of the House of Assembly. As seen in the case of Emeka Ihedioha and the incumbent governor Hope Uzodimma.

== See also ==
- List of governors of Imo State
- Executive Council of Imo State
