= Ezinihitte Mbaise =

- LGA
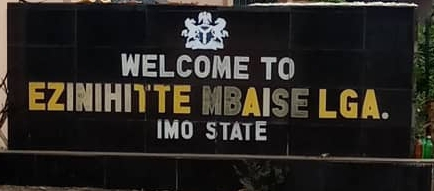
- Signage of Ezinihitte Mbaise Headquarters
- Nickname: Ezi
- Interactive map of Ezinihitte Mbaise
- Country: Nigeria
- State: Imo State
- Headquarters: Otu

Government
  - Local Government Chairman: Chinedum Nwachukwu
- Time zone: UTC+1 (WAT)
- Postal code: 462110-462123

Ezinihitte Mbaise is a local Government Area in Imo State, Nigeria. Its headquarters is in Itu. This region part of the broader Mbaise area, became an independent LGA in 1989, following its separation from the Aboh Mbaise LGA.

The LGA comprises several communities and towns, including areas like Akpodim, Onicha, and Obizi. Ezinihitte Mbaise's cultural identity is shaped by traditional dances and music that reflect the local customs and social values.
