= Imo State House of Assembly =

Legislative arm of the government of Imo State of Nigeria

The Imo State House of Assembly is the legislative arm of the government of Imo State of Nigeria. It is a unicameral legislature with 27 members elected from the 27 local government areas of the state.

== See also ==
- Houses of assembly of Nigerian states
