= Umuezukwe =

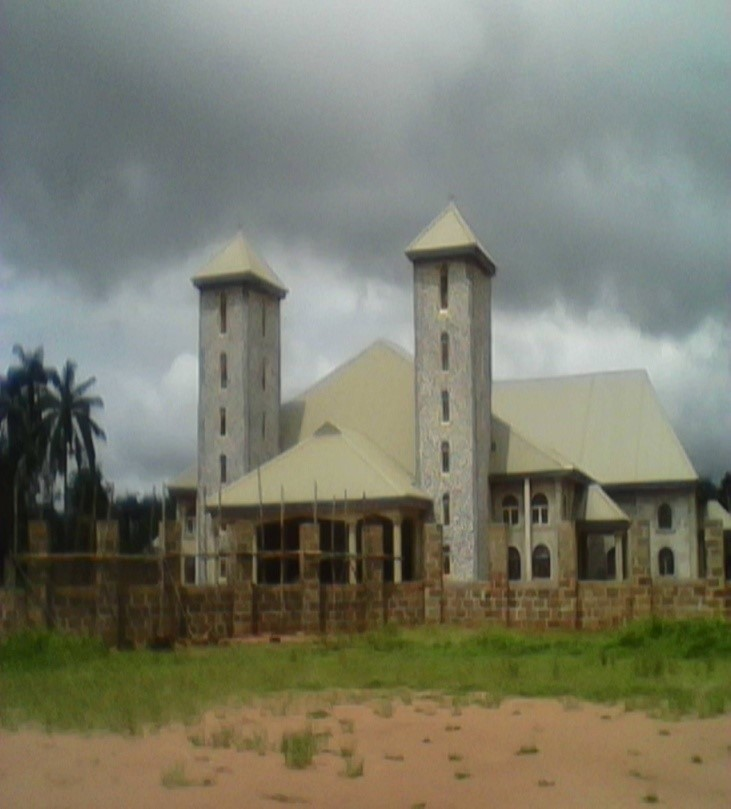
- St Anthony's Catholic Parish, Umuezukwe, Awo-omamma
- Nickname: Uzo Umuezukwe
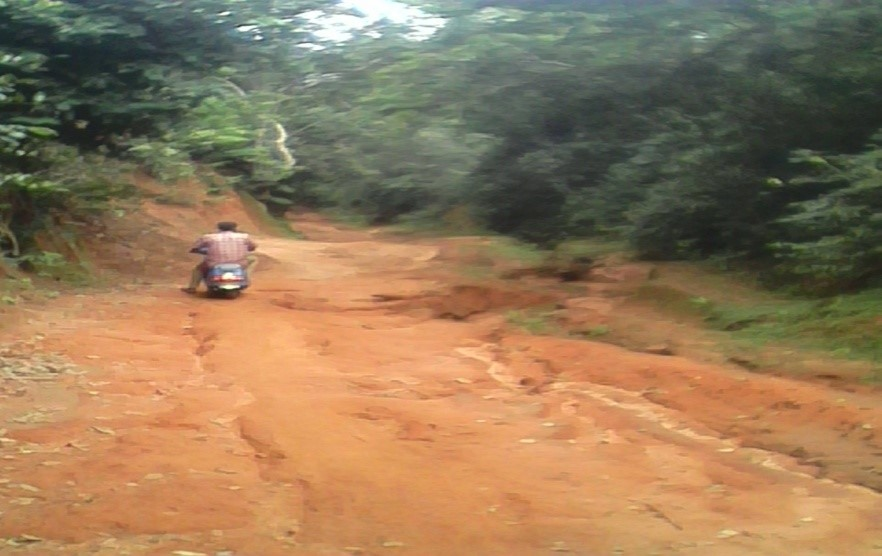
- Umuezukwe Road, Awo-Omamma is an ancient access road that leads to Ughamiri (local name for Njaba River). The road leads to the historic and now abandoned Umuezukwe Oil mill factory on the waterfront. It was an important economic access road to the eastern coast via Njaba River-Oguta Lake-Orashi River waterways during the pre-colonial and oil palm trades.

- Location of Umuezukwe, Awo-Omamma
- Coordinates: 5°41′29″N 6°54′9″E
- State: Imo
- Local Government Area: Oru East
- Town: Awo-Omamma
- Autonomous Community: Eziawo II

Government
  - Governor: Hope Uzodinma (APC)
- 6-digit postal code prefix: 474112
- ISO 3166 code: NG.IM.OE.OM

Umuezukwe is an ancient trade route, a river port, and a farming community in Awo-Omamma, northeast of the Niger Delta region, Nigeria's South East, Imo State. It is one of the densely populated Awo-Omamma rural settlements in the Njaba River basin.

== Location ==
Umuezukwe is located strategically on the bank of Njaba River in the southern end, facing Ngbelle, Abiaziem, Awa, Ndegwu and Izombe, just across the river. Politically, Umuezukwe is in Eziawo Ward II of Awo-Omamma in Oru East. It is bordered by Isieke Community to the East, Umuezike to the West, Otulu in Oru West to the North-East, and Onitsha-Owerri Expressway to the extreme North, which cuts through Awo-Omamma Junction.

== Oil Palm Trade ==
Like some other Awo-Omamma villages on the banks of Njaba River, Umuezukwe was known for its oil palm trade during the era of international oil palm business. The then government of Eastern Region operated an Oil mill factory near Njaba River waterfront in Umuezukwe. In addition to the government managed Umuezukwe Oil mill, private businesses moved in, established and operated their commercial mills within the community and its neighbours. Due to the lucrative oil palm trade and the commercial waterway in the region, the community's Eke Market held on the river beach, becoming a converging point for local and international traders, thus supporting the larger market of neighbouring Oguta. The market was renamed 'Eke Beach Umuezukwe'. The economic activities around the entire area turned Umuezukwe into one of the renowned river ports in the basin, and an economic hub for exports and evacuation of goods to and from the Eastern coast via Orashi River-Oguta Lake-Njaba River routes.

== Early Christian Mission ==
It was among the early communities in the Njaba/Orashi River region, and the first in Awo-Omamma to embrace Christianity. This was possible because of its location on Njaba River-Oguta Lake-Orashi River navigable waterways and trade route.

=== Parish ===
The Irish Christian missionaries founded St Anthony's Catholic Church, Umuezukwe, in the 1890s. On 28 March 2013, the Roman Catholic Church confirmed Umuezukwe as a parish at the Cathedral of the Most Holy Trinity, Orlu.

=== Education ===
In 1897, the foundation blocks for St Anthony's Primary School, Umuezukwe, was laid. The school was eventually completed in 1908. Following government take over of the management of the School from the church, it was renamed Umuezukwe Primary School, a public institution. Analysis of survey conducted on 16 April 2014 for combined Pre-primary and Primary Schools showed the school was understaffed and in need of modern and adequate classrooms to support effective teaching and learning. Specifically, the survey found that the school had 345 learners served by 5 teachers and 9 classrooms. That is, 185 male students and 160 female students.

== Tourism ==
In addition to its Ughamiri (local name for Njaba River) waterfront, oil-palm forest, Umuezukwe is known in the region for its sacred monkeys which exist and move freely in their natural habitat within the 'Afo' sacred forest, and in the community. The ancient economic nerve, Umuezukwe, and the entire Awo-Omamma people are also rich in cultural festivals, masks, and dance. Sections of Awo-Omamma closer the river are in lowlands. Umuezukwe, other Awo-Omamma and Oguta LGA communities across the river such as Ubahaeze, Umuezike, Umuelibe, Ngbelle, Abiaziem, Ndegwu and Awa, have hilly areas and valleys with forests just before the waterfronts on both sides.

In addition, the relics of the historic Umuezukwe Oil mill on the beach, the historic and asphalt-needed 'Umuezukwe Road' washing unto Njaba River, and the relics of St Anthony's Primary school building, are other attractive sites in the community. The historic network of roads in Umuezukwe aided the lucrative trade and farming relationships with neighbours and other riverine communities in Oguta LGA, Ohaji/Egbema, and Rivers State through Njaba River-Oguta Lake-Orashi River navigable waterways to the Eastern coast.

== Cash Crops ==
In addition to its known cassava, yam and fish produce, Umuezukwe produced and earned income from cashew nuts from the community's cashew plantation in the hilly lowland valley region known as Aba-Umuezukwe.

== Economic challenges ==
Poor and undeveloped road conditions coupled with unreliable electricity supply are some of the serious infrastructure and environmental challenges working against the restoration of the economic potentials of Umuezukwe, the entire Awo-Omamma and rural farming border communities in Oguta LGA.

=== Rural Access Road ===
The river basin's rural communities have huge economic potentials, including arable land and fishing ports for farming, that require basic infrastructure, more importantly interconnecting roads and bridge across Njaba River to link up "Umuezukwe Road" to their neighbours in Oguta LGA, in order to unlock the economic potentials and improve the lives of residents and businesses in Oru East and Oguta LGA communities. The trade and historic route to and from Orlu communities connecting Omuma, Amiri, passing through Umuezukwe over Njaba River, Oguta to the Eastern coast and other Niger Delta communities, needs to be developed, bridged and asphalted to improve economic activities - movement of goods and people in the region.
