= Njaba =

Local Government Area in Imo State, Nigeria

Njaba Njalga
- LGA
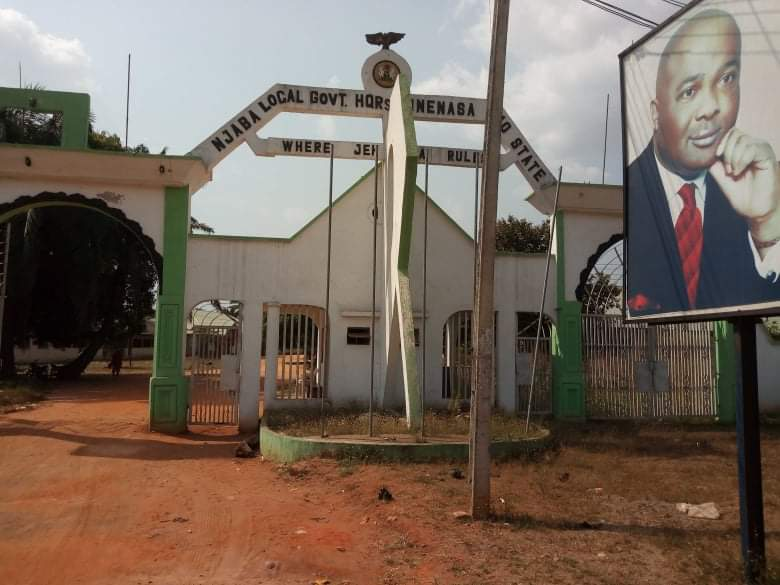
- Entrance to the building of Njaba Local Government Area
- Interactive map of Njaba
- Country: Nigeria
- State: Imo State
- Capital: Nnenasa

Government
  - Local Government Chairman: Vitalis Ugo Obi

Area
  - Land: 84 km^{2} (32 sq mi)

Population (2006)
  - Total: 143,485
  - Density: 1,700/km^{2} (4,400/sq mi)
- Time zone: UTC+1 (WAT)
- Postal code: 474

Njaba// is a Local Government Area of Imo State, Nigeria. Its headquarters is located in the town of Nnenasa. It has an area of 84 km^{2} and a population of 143,485 at the 2006 census. The 2011 density projection is 2,004.5 inhabitants/km^{2}. The postal code of the area is 474.

Njaba was formed from the initial letters of Njaba River. Njaba river springs from the north-western part of Isu, Isu Njaba town. Flows down to Oguta and finally settles into the famous Oguta Lake. On May 27, 1980, NJALGA was created as part of the Isu Local Government Area by Alhaji Shehu Shagari who was the head of Civilian Government.

It has the responsibility of collecting licence fees. It also has the ability to discharge such functions as public health; pre-school, primary and adult education; town planning; waste disposal; local transportation; and roads maintenance. The following are the towns that make up Njaba : Umaka, Achara, Amafor, Amainyi, Ibele, Amakor, Isiozi, Obeakpu, Ogbelle, Uba, Umele, Ukwudo, Abazu, Umuewi, Umudirogha, Umuelem, Umuneke, Umuofeke, Umuokwara, Umuseke, Amucha, Aguwa, Duriaku, Duruewuru, Duroboaku, Duruigwe, Ebeasaa, Ebeise, Eziene, Umuduruoka, Umunudo, Umunzu, Umuokpoko, Umuoma, Umuorji, Umuzikeabum, Atta, Egwedu, Eziuba, Isiekwe, Ohima, Ubokoro, Ubudom, Ugbele, Umuerim, Umumanu, Umunam, Umuoke.

Njaba Local Government Area is bounded by Oru East LGA, Isu, Mbaitolu, Orlu and Nkwerre Local Government Areas. Njaba LGA is located at the east of Oru East Local Government Area, Awo-omamma as the nearest border with Okwudor.

== History ==
The name "NJABA" is an acronym formed from the initial letters of Njaba River. A river that originally springs from north-western part of Isu at Isunjaba town, and runs all the way to Oguta and then finally terminates into the famous Oguta Lake. NJABA LGA was part of the then Isu Local Government area created by the Civilian Government headed by Alhaji Shehu Shagari on May 27, 1980. Developing towns and settlements in the Local Government Area include Umuaka, Amazano, Isiozi, Ugbelle, Achara, Ibelle, Okwudor, Nkume, Attah, Amucha, and Egwedu.

== Location and Boundaries ==
Njaba LGA is bounded by Oru East, Isu, Mbaitoli, Orlu and Nkwerre Local Government Areas. Njaba Local Government Area (NJABA LGA), is located east of Oru East Local Government Area with Awo-Omamma as the nearest border town overlooking Okwudor. NJALGA via Okwudor shares its common boundary with Awo-omamma on the western axis. On the north and, north-east, it is bounded by Obor, Umutanze, Umudioka and Umuowa communities in Orlu LGA. NJALGA is bounded on the west and south-west by Amurie-Omanze and Ekwe Communities of Isu Local Government Area, while it shares its southern border with Orodo, Eziama Obiato and Afara towns of Mbaitoli Local Government area bordering Umuaka. Njaba River then demarcates Umuaka of NJALGA from Ekwe Community of Isu in the western borders.

NJALGA, especially in the Umuaka and Okwudor communities, is almost located in a heavily re-enforced rain forest and valleyed area.
