= Nsofor =

- Gender: Male
- Language: Igbo

Origin
- Origin: Nigeria
- Meaning: The rules guiding the Ofor
- Region of origin: South-east Nigeria

Nsofor audio is a Nigerian surname used by the Igbo people of South Eastern Nigeria. The name means "The rules guiding the Ofor".

== Notable people with the name ==
- Tony Nsofor, Nigerian painter
- Victor Nsofor Obinna, Nigerian footballer
- Sylvanus Adiewere Nsofor, Nigerian Jurist
