= Oru East =

- LGA
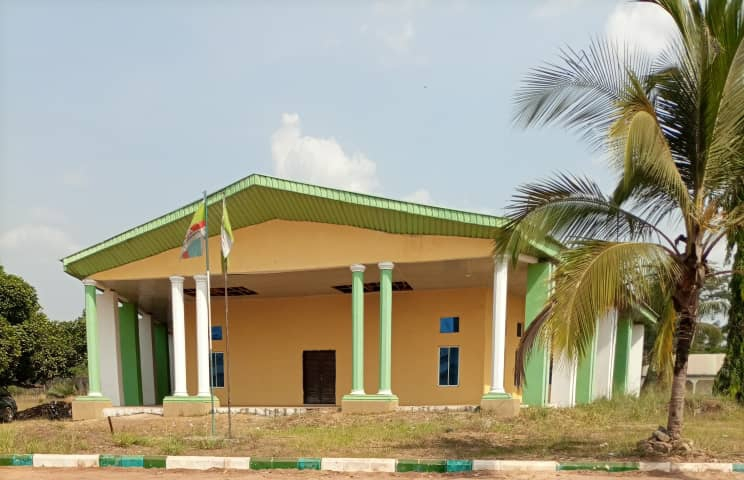
- Oru East Headquarters Building
- Nickname: ORELGA
- Motto: Oru jiri Aku nweta mmiri
- Interactive map of Oru East
- Country: Nigeria
- State: Imo State
- Capital: Omuma

Government
  - Local Government Chairman: Nnamdi Okaraigwe

Area
  - Total: 136 km^{2} (53 sq mi)

Population (2006)
  - Total: 195,743
  - Density: 964.2/km^{2} (2,497/sq mi)
- Time zone: UTC+1 (WAT)
- Postal code: 474

Oru-East is a Local Government Area of Imo State, Nigeria. Its headquarters is at Omuma. The following are towns that make up Oru East: Akatta, Akuma, Amagu, Amiri, Awo-Omamma, and Omuma.

Oru East is bounded by Njaba LGA, Mbaitolu, Orlu, Oguta, Orsu and Oru west Local Government Area. Oru East has an estimated population of 195,743 (2006 census) and an area of 136 km^{2} (53 sq mi). Amazu and Amaebu communities shares border with Akatta, Awo idemili with Akuma and Amagu, Orlu with Oru East at Obor town and Okporo with Akatta. Oru west shares border with Oguta LGA on the northern part of Abiaziem, mgbele, Awa, and Akabor communities.

The Local government area is rich in oil and gas amongst its neighbouring towns such as Oru West and Oguta LGA. In the year 2010, a production projection from Addax petroleum operating in Njaba River basin, under oil mining license OML 124, was placed at about 15,000-20,000 barrels of oil per day in the council area, Awo-omamma.

== Location and boundaries ==
Oru East is bounded by Njaba LGA, Mbaitoli, Orlu, Oguta, Orsu and Oru West Local Government Areas. Orlu shares border with Oru East at Obor Town and Okporo bordering Akatta, Amazu and Amaebu bordering Akatta, Awo Idemili bordering Akuma and Amagu. On the west of Awo-omamma, it shares borders Oguta LGA on the northern part of Abiaziem, Mgbele, Awa and Akabor communities. The LGA also shares a border with Mbaitoli LGA via Eziama-Obiato on the south of Awo-omamma. Oru-East has an area of 136 km^{2} and estimated population of 195,743 (2006 census). The postal code of the area is 474.

== Oil and gas exploration ==
As it is the case in neighbouring oil rich Oru West and Oguta LGAs, Oru-East has been proven rich in crude oil and gas. As of 2010, production projection from Addax Petroleum, already operating in Njaba River basin under Oil Mining License, OML 124, was placed at about 15,000 to 20,000 barrels of oil per day from Awo-omamma in the council area.

== Notable people ==
- Onyekachi Okonkwo, former player Super Eagles
- Hope Uzodimma, governor of Imo state since 2020
