= Izombe =

Town in Imo, Nigeria

- Location of Izombe in Nigeria
- Coordinates: 5°38′0″N 6°52′0″E
- Country: Nigeria
- State: Imo
- Local Government Area: Oguta

Government
  - Governor: Senator Hope Uzodimma (APC)

Area
  - Land: 59.0 km^{2} (22.8 sq mi)

Izombe in the northeast of Niger Delta is an oil town in Njaba River basin, Imo State Southeastern Nigeria.

== Location ==
Located in Oguta Local Government, Izombe is some 30 kilometres (19 miles) from Owerri and 150 kilometres (93 miles) north of Port Harcourt. It covers about 59 square kilometres (23 square miles) in Njaba River basin, South East Nigeria. The estimated human population as of 1991 National Census was 86,565.

== Oil and Gas Exploration ==
Oil exploration and production in Izombe area started in the early 1960s.Three major multinational oil companies including ChevronTexaco, Shell and Addax Petroleum operate in the area, producing over 70% of total oil from Oguta Local Government Area.Ossu (some 55 km south of Onitsha), Izombe and Njaba are some of the oil wells in the area.By end of Q4 of 2008, Addax Petroleum Corporation announced it was set to expand its Operations in the Njaba River basin through its new oil discovery in its Njaba field in the neighbouring Awo-Omamma town. The new discovery in the company's OML124 license area on the Northeast edge of the Niger Delta contains undeveloped Njaba 2 well onshore Nigeria and other exploratory prospects, On February 5, 2015, Seplat Petroleum Development Company Plc ("Seplat" or the "Company"), announced that it has completed the acquisition of a 40.00% working interest in OML 53 in the area from Chevron Nigeria Limited ("CNL") with NNPC holding the remaining 60.00% interest in Oil Mining License block.

== Gas flaring ==
Gas flaring in Izombe started as soon as oil exploration commenced in the early 1960s. This activity has resulted to poor yield of crops, respiratory diseases and other health problems due to the release of poisonous chemicals including greenhouse gases.

== Izombe Gas Processing ==
There has been an ongoing project to develop an Integrated Gas Processing Plant in Izombe. This is in response to Federal Government directive to Oil and Gas companies to stop routine gas flaring by end of 2008. The plant, estimated to cost about $135 million, is designed to produce 200 metric tonnes of LPG; and about 1000 barrels of condensate from a feed gas of about 40 million standards cubic feet per day. Izombe Gas Processing Company Limited would help smaller companies operating in the area to save operational costs as companies whose gas volumes are not enough to feed major gas utilization projects would avoid the cost of constructing private gas gathering facilities to meet the Government's directive.

Owel–Linkso Group obtained approval from the Nigerian National Petroleum Corporation to progress the project in July 2010. The company had earlier signed a Heads of Agreement with Addax Petroleum Development (Nigeria) Limited, APDNL, in 2004, to develop and operate an LPG plant at Izombe in the OML 124 area. The Izombe Gas processing plant once operational will take feed gas from the Izombe flow station and other flow stations within the immediate vicinity and deliver dry gas to 381MW Egbema Power Station, an open cycle gas turbine power plant being developed in neighbouring Ohaji/Egbema.

In August, 2012, Prime Minister Kamla Persad-Bissessar of Trinidad and Tobago said she was awaiting a report on the proposed Izombe Gas Processing Project between the National Gas Company, the National Energy Corporation and Phoenix Park Gas Processors Limited of Trinidad and Tobago and the Nigerian National Petroleum Corporation, NNPC. The Izombe Gas Processing Company is projected to serve as a major inland gas processing hub for most stranded gas within the oil-rich Njaba River basin and other stranded gas in that axis. Specifically, the project offers a total gas utilization strategy for gas that had been flared from ChevronTexaco’s OML 53 and Addax’s OML 124 in the area.

== Agriculture and Infrastructure ==
Izombe is predominantly a farming community. The area cultivates crops such as cassava, yam, three-leaf yams, and maize among others. Like many other parts of Njaba River basin, tree crops produced in the area include oil palm fruits, cocoanuts, breadfruits and pear. These farmers experience economic constraints that militate against efficient operation of their farming activities. in their villages. To alleviate transportation problems of rural dwellers and farmers on Njaba River Basin, assistance is needed to construct new motorable roads to link farming villages and river landing sites such as Umuezukwe and Ubahaeze both in Awo-Omamma, and Abiaziem and Izombe both in Oguta LGA
