= Orashi River =

River in Nigeria

Urashi River, Nigeria
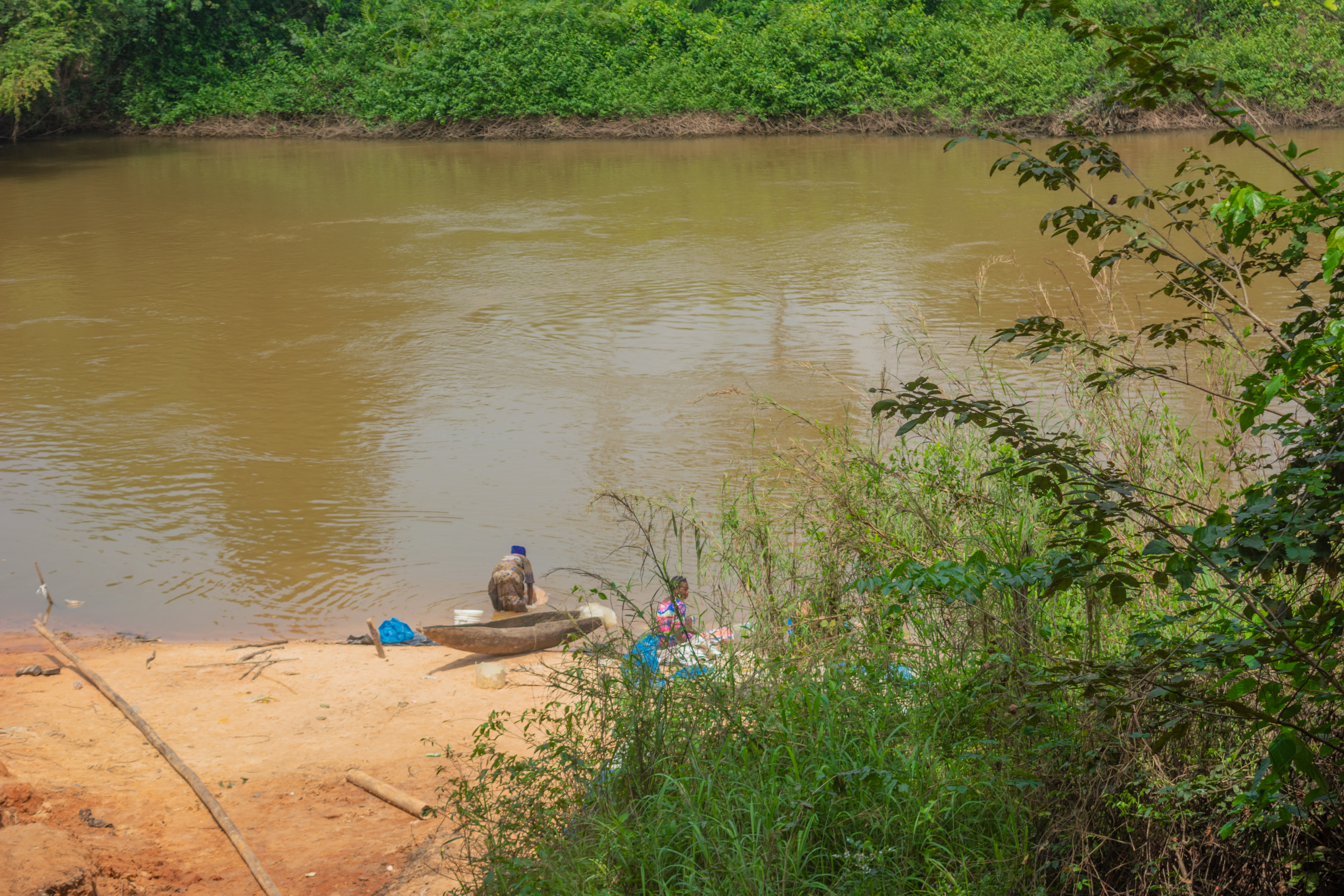
- Women sitting on sloping sandy point bar and washing in the Orashi River in Oguta.
- Native name: Urashi, Ulasi (Igbo)

Physical characteristics
- Source
  - location: Ezeama, Dikenafai, Imo State.
  - coordinates: 5°48′35″N 7°4′23″E
  - elevation: 183 m (600 ft)
- Length: 205 km (127 mi)

Basin features
- River system: Niger River
- Tributaries
  - left: Okposi, Engenni
  - right: Bonima, Ubu, Epie
- Waterbodies: Oguta Lake

Orashi River (also Urashi or Ulasi), is a river of the lower Niger River basin, and a tributary of Oguta Lake, southeastern Nigeria. Urashi takes off, 183 m (600 ft) above mean sea level, from the rocks in Ezeama community of Dikenafai, Imo State. Described as a lifeline to Ideato South communities, Orashi stream serves as an all purpose river for drinking, washing and many others to communities such as Umulewe, Umuchima and Ntueke in the area.

== Urashi Waterfall ==
Urashi River takes off as a stream, from the rocks, at the base of a waterfall, 183 m above mean sea level, in the Urashi enclave of Ezeama in Dikenafai, Imo State.

The entrance to the waterfall was around the corner from Ezeama, the Water God's altar. "It was a narrow, unassuming pathway cut into the thicket of the forest. From the pathway, one could hear the steady rush of water growing louder as one drew near. A gentle mist hung in the air; a sweet combination of salty rainwater mixed with the smell of fresh wet earth. The pathway, which was less than a quarter of a mile long, soon gave way to a clear opening and there suddenly the waterfall appeared, a breathtaking view, like a huge strike of lightning on a bright summer day", described Nema Obih.

== Flow ==
From Dikenafai, Urashi flows through several towns, including Urualla, Akokwa, Okija, Orsu, Ukpor, Ihiala, Uli, Oguta, Osemotor, Omoku, Obiakpo, Ebocha, Ukodu, Okarki, Mbiama and Epie. The river forms tributaries along its flow, from Imo through Anambra, Rivers to Bayelsa, before empting onto the Atlantic. It splits into two at Egbema. The larger portion (right), continued the flow through Eluku before splitting further into two and emptying its waters and sediments at Edi Kalama (Degema) and Abonnema into the gulf of Biafra.

== Gallery ==
=== Orashi River in Oguta ===
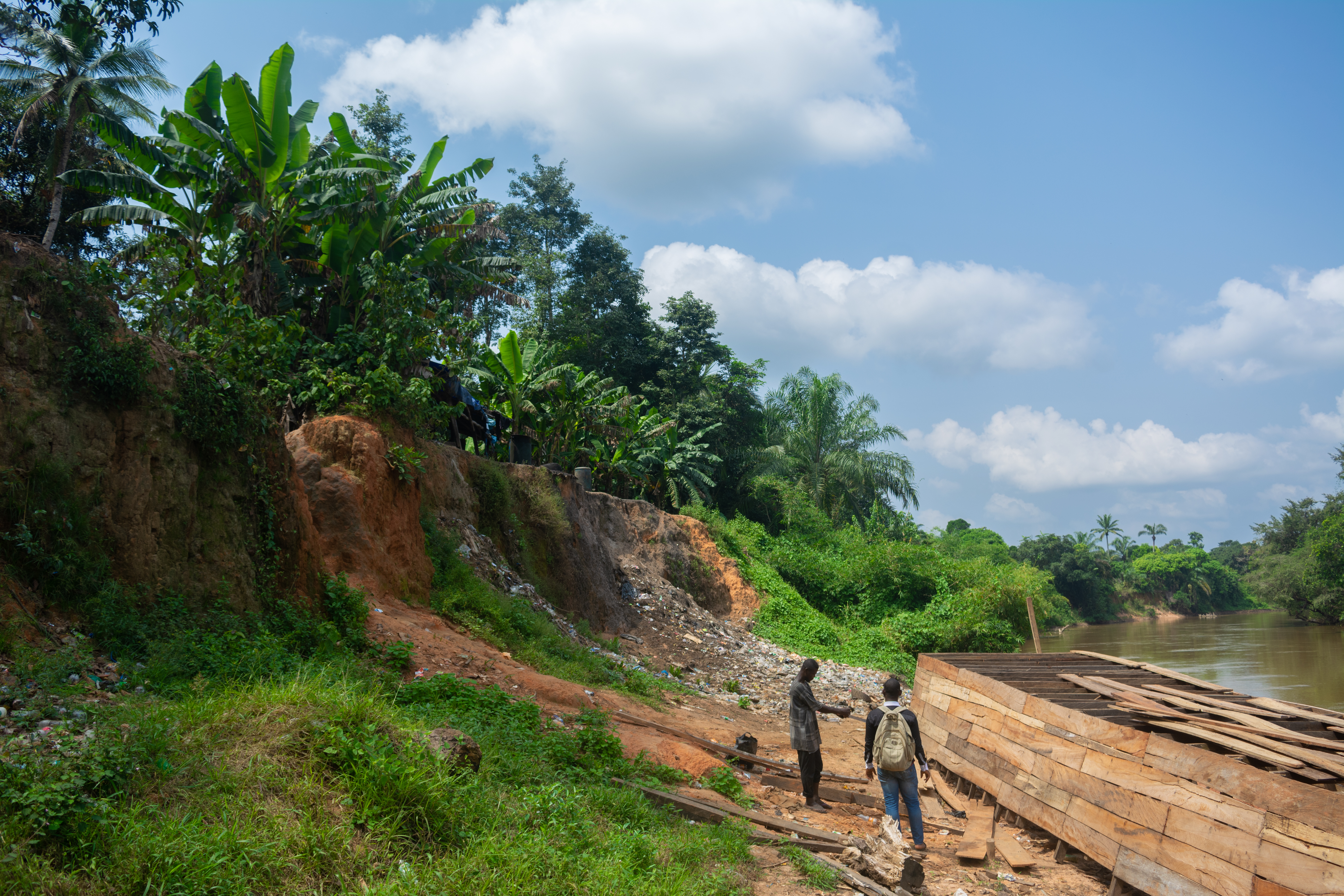
Wooden made boat and vegetation stabilized cut bank on Orashi river

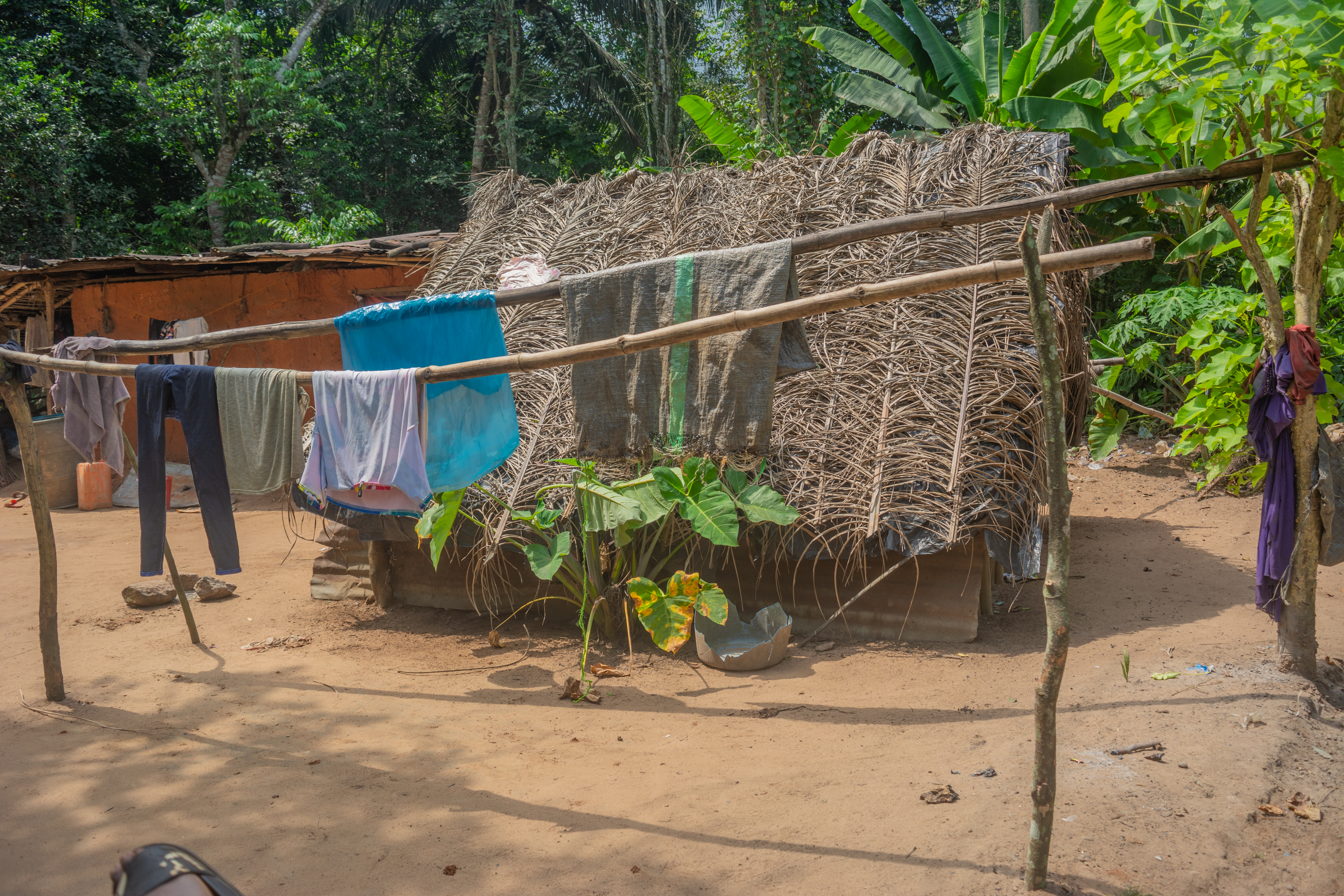
Residential thatched houses at the entrance of Orashi river

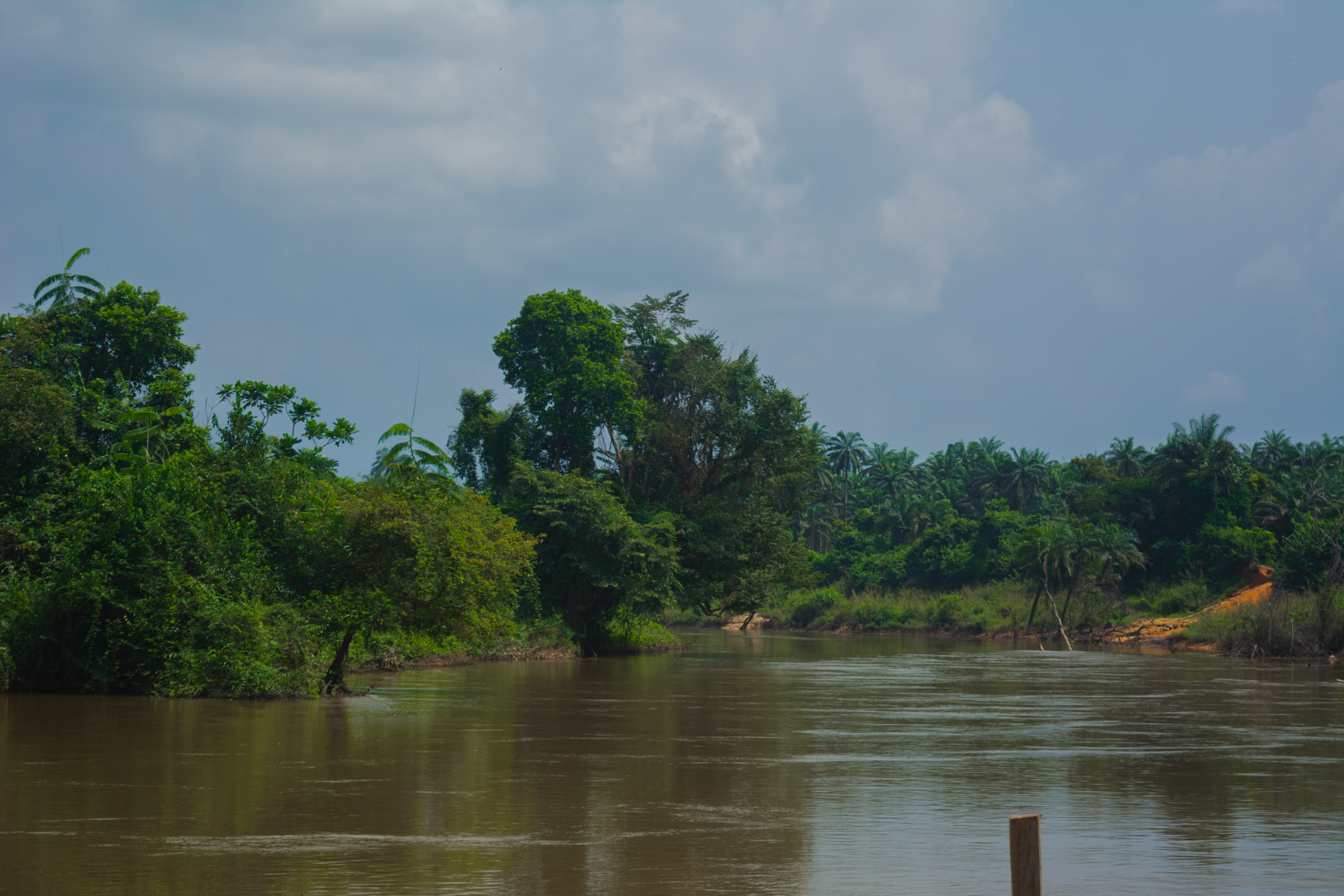
Orashi river showing vegetation at the far side of the river bank

=== Orashi River in Ideato South ===
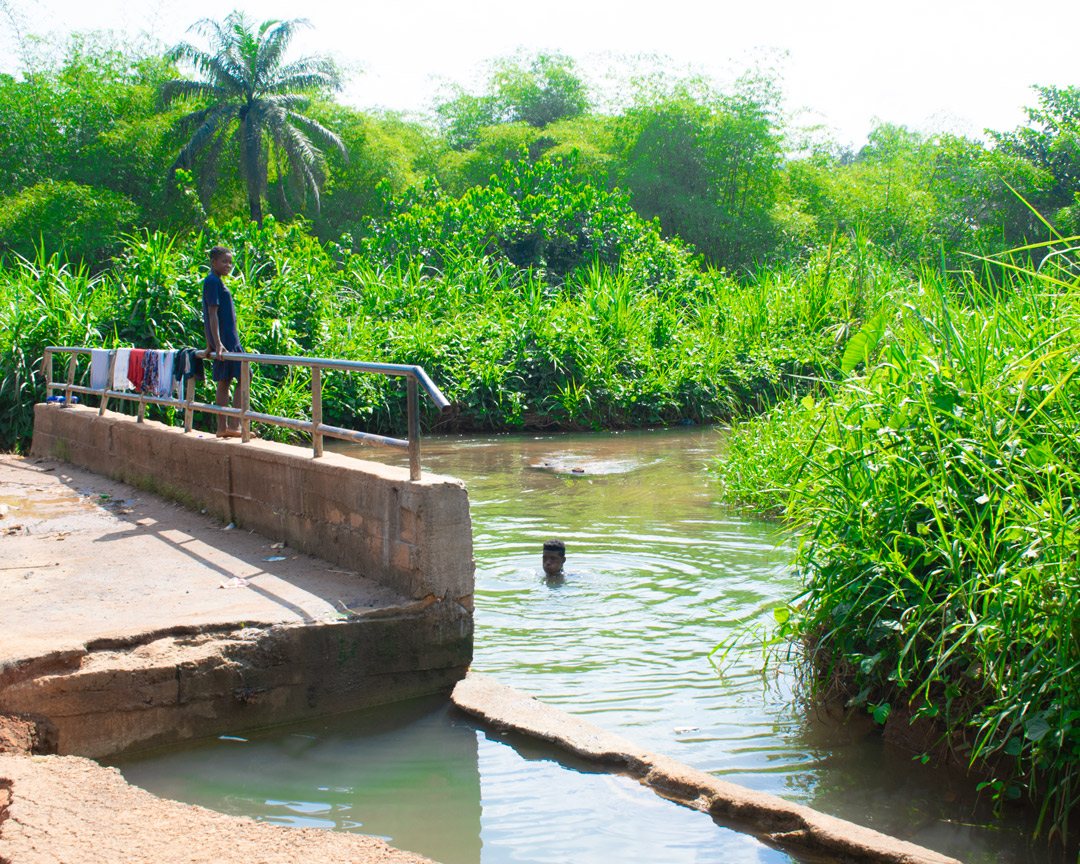
Swimming and washing of clothes being done at the river.

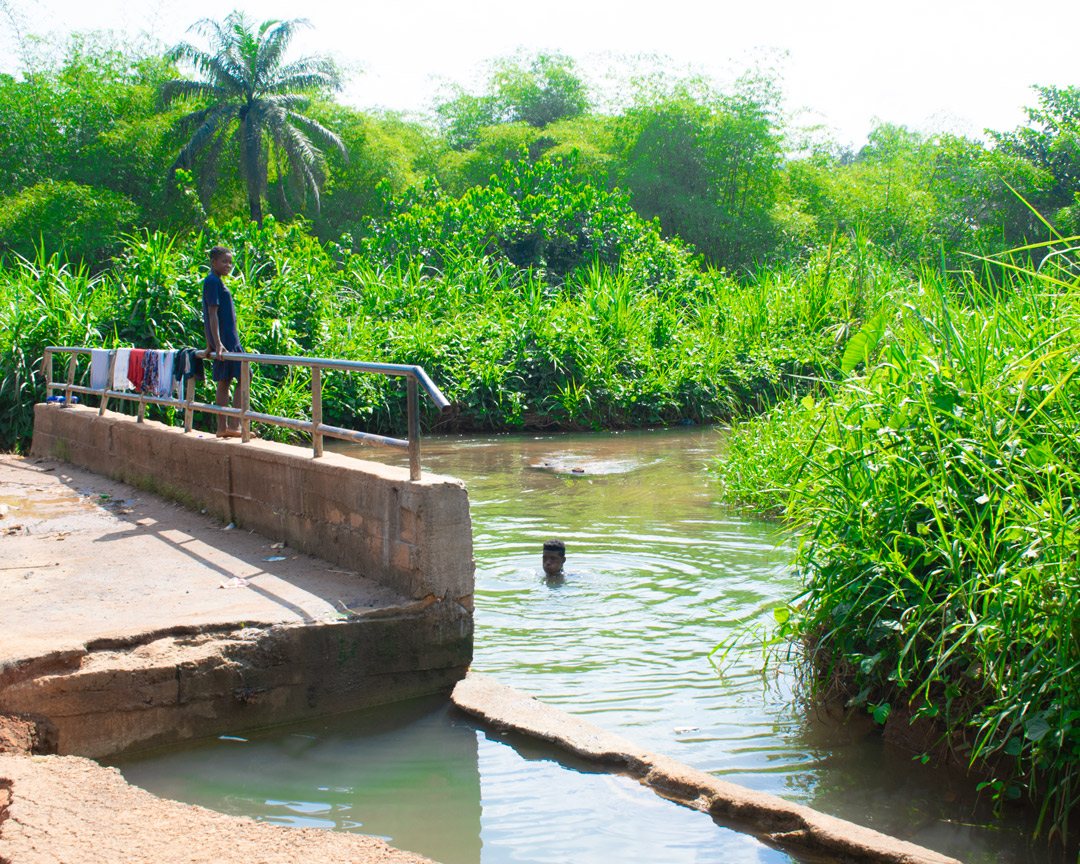
Other side of Orashi River in Ideato South with palm trees, bamboo tree and bushes surrounding the river.

== Economy ==
Urashi Region is in the rainforest zone, southeastern Nigeria. Crop cultivation, oil palm cultivation and fishing are the major occupation of the people and source of livelihood. The zone may be termed an ‘oil palm bush.’ The forest zone is characterized by abundance of plant species, sometimes exceeding 150 different species per hectare. From its source down to the Atlantic, the river supports several fishermen and provides means of livelihood for their families. Urashi Region, which includes Njaba River basin, holds over 35% of the oil wells in the Niger Delta states of Imo and Rivers.

== Trade Route and Waterway ==
Urashi river as an ancient trade and cultural route, has provided means of transportation and migration for indigenous communities who moved from one town to another by canoe for cultural, social or economic purposes on market days. To improve inland waterways in Nigeria, the Federal Government approved the dredging of the Urashi River from Oguta Lake in Imo State to Degema in Rivers State. The project which was awarded to Simidia S and I International Company in May 2012 was to be completed in 12 months. The 205 kilometers river was expected to be dredged with a bed width of 40 meters, top width of 70 meters and depth below dredging chart datum of 1.5 meters.
