= Okwudor =

Okwudor Okwudo
- Town
- Location in Nigeria
- Coordinates: 5°43′10″N 7°00′30″E
- Country: Nigeria
- State: Imo State

Government
  - Type: local government council
- Time zone: UTC+1 (WAT)

Okwudor (natively Okwudo) is an autonomous community/town in the northern section of Njaba Local Government Area of Imo State, Nigeria. It is one of the local government areas that make up the Orlu zone of the state. Okwudor shares boundaries with, Amucha, Attah, Awo-omamma, Egwedu, Nkume and Umuaka towns. It's one of the communities that make up nnenasa. In land area, Okwudor is the largest town in northern Njaba with some rough estimates from locals claiming it Is reach makes it the largest town in the entire Njaba LGA, as the town sits on the northern bank of Njaba River. The famous river separates Okwudor from Umuaka.

It has an estimated population of over 10,000 people spread across eight sub-cities (or villages). These sub-cities were Umuofeke, Umuduruogba, Umuseke and Umuelem. Others were Umuneke, Umuewi, Umuokwara and Abazu. In 2002, the second set of villages viz. Umuneke, Umuewi, Umuokwara and Abazu came together and formed a new autonomous community called Ihebinowere.
