= Oguta Lake =

Lake in Imo State, Nigeria

- Ogbuide (Igbo); Ughamiri (Igbo)
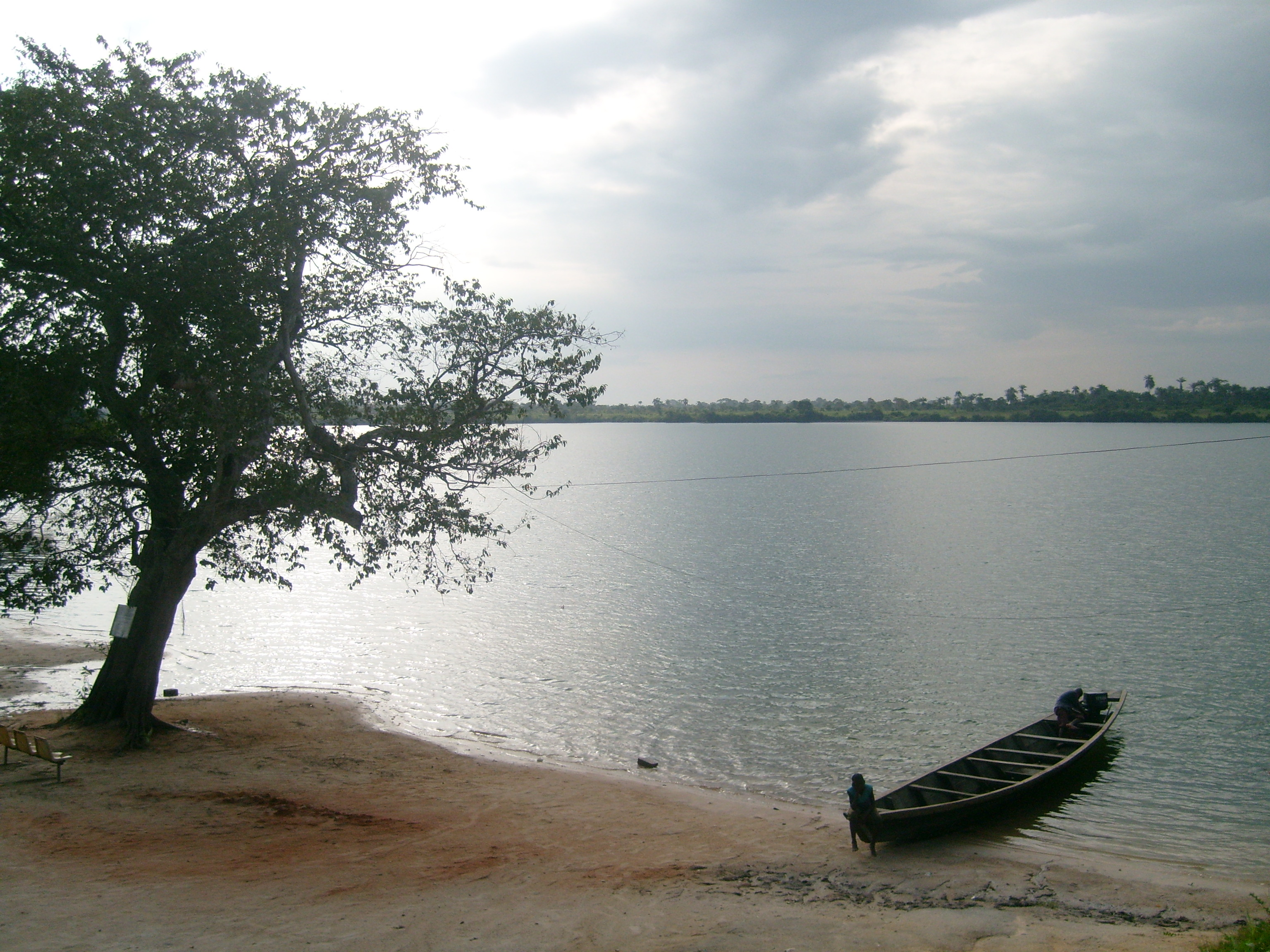

- Location within Nigeria
- Location: Imo State
- Coordinates: 5°42′24″N 6°47′33″E
- Primary inflows: Utu, Awbana, Orashi and Njaba rivers
- Basin countries: Nigeria
- Max. depth: 8 m (26 ft)

Ramsar Wetland
- Designated: 30 April 2008
- Reference no.: 1757

Oguta Lake is a lean 'finger lake' formed by the damming of the lower Njaba River with alluvium. it is the largest natural lake in Imo State, Southeastern Nigeria; within the equatorial rainforest region of Niger Delta. Oguta Lake's catchment area comprises the drainage area of the Njaba River and a part of the River Niger floodplain in the region south of Onitsha.

== Location ==
The lake is situated in Oguta about 50 kilometres (30 mi) from the junction of the Ndoni and Orashi River. It is about eight kilometres (5 mi) long from east to west and 2.5 kilometres (1 1/2 mi)wide. The lake is 5:41-5:44N, 6:41-6:50E; <50 m above sea level

The stream from Njaba River is the major inflow to Oguta Lake. The other three tributaries are Awbana, Utu and Orashi. The Orashi River flows past Oguta Lake in its southwestern portion.

== Climate ==
The wet season is warm while the dry season is hot, muggy, and partly cloudy in Oguta Lake. During the year, the temperature typically varies from 20 °C (68 °F) to 31 °C (88 °F) and is rarely below 16 °C (60 °F) or above 33 °C (91 °F).

Based on beach/pool score, the best time of year to visit Oguta for hot-weather activities is from late November to late January.

== Economic importance ==
The lake is important to the people of oil-rich Njaba River basin including Oguta, Orsu, Mgbidi, Nkwesi, Osemotor, Nnebukwu, Mgbele, Awa Awo-Omamma Akabo as a source of water, fish, tourism and an outlet for sewerage. Uhamiri is the goddess of the lake.

== Trade route ==
The river route Njaba and Orashi via Oguta Lake to the coast, passing through Awo-omamma, Mgbidi, Oguta, Ndoni, Abonnema, Degema made Oguta, Osemotor, Awo-omamma and surrounding towns. Oguta Lake also served as a Biafran army marine base during the Nigerian Civil War.

== Pictures of Oguta Lake ==
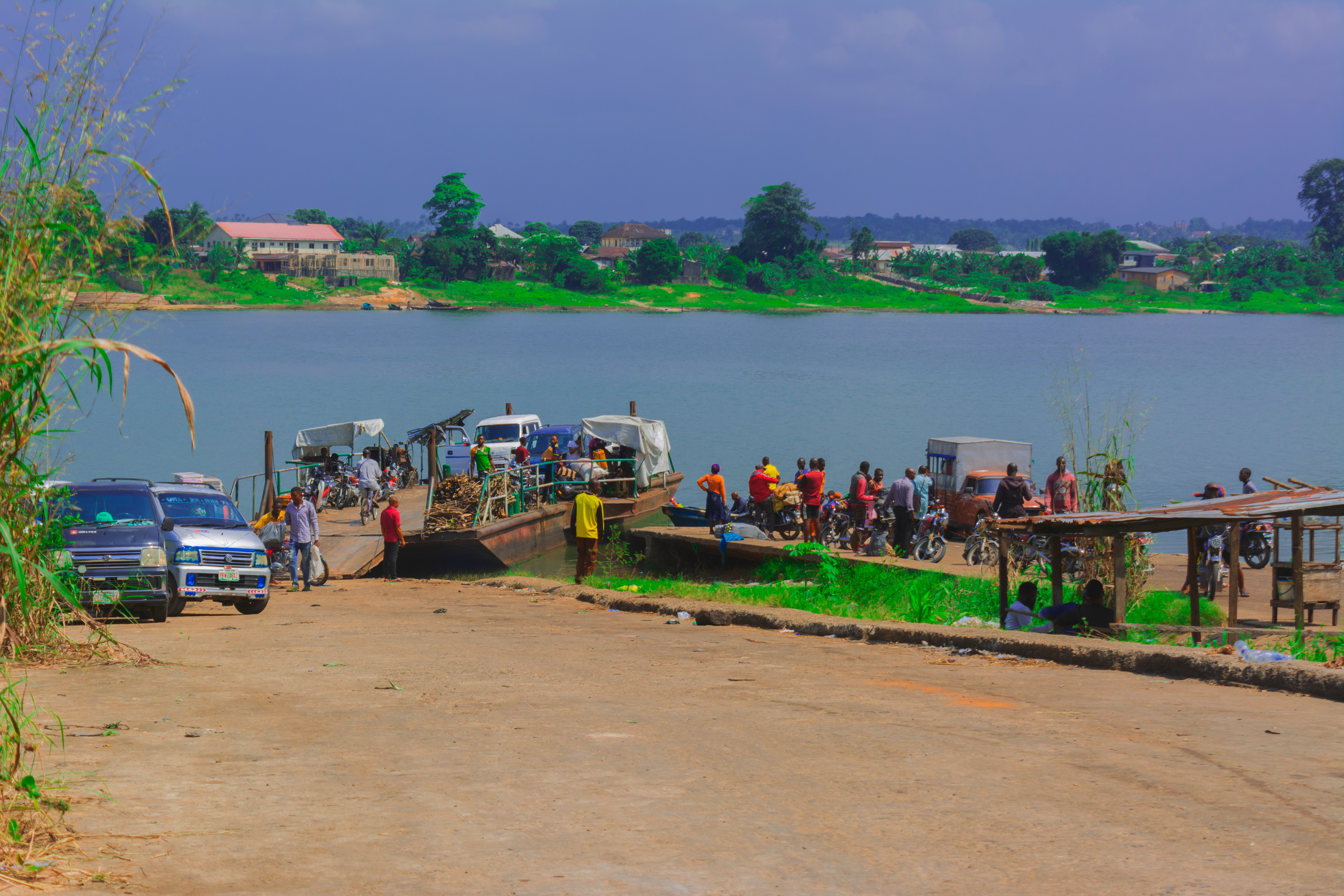
Bank of Oguta Lake showing human activities and rural dwellers. These include motorcyclists, loaded pontoon and automobile drivers engaged in movement of goods, services and people.

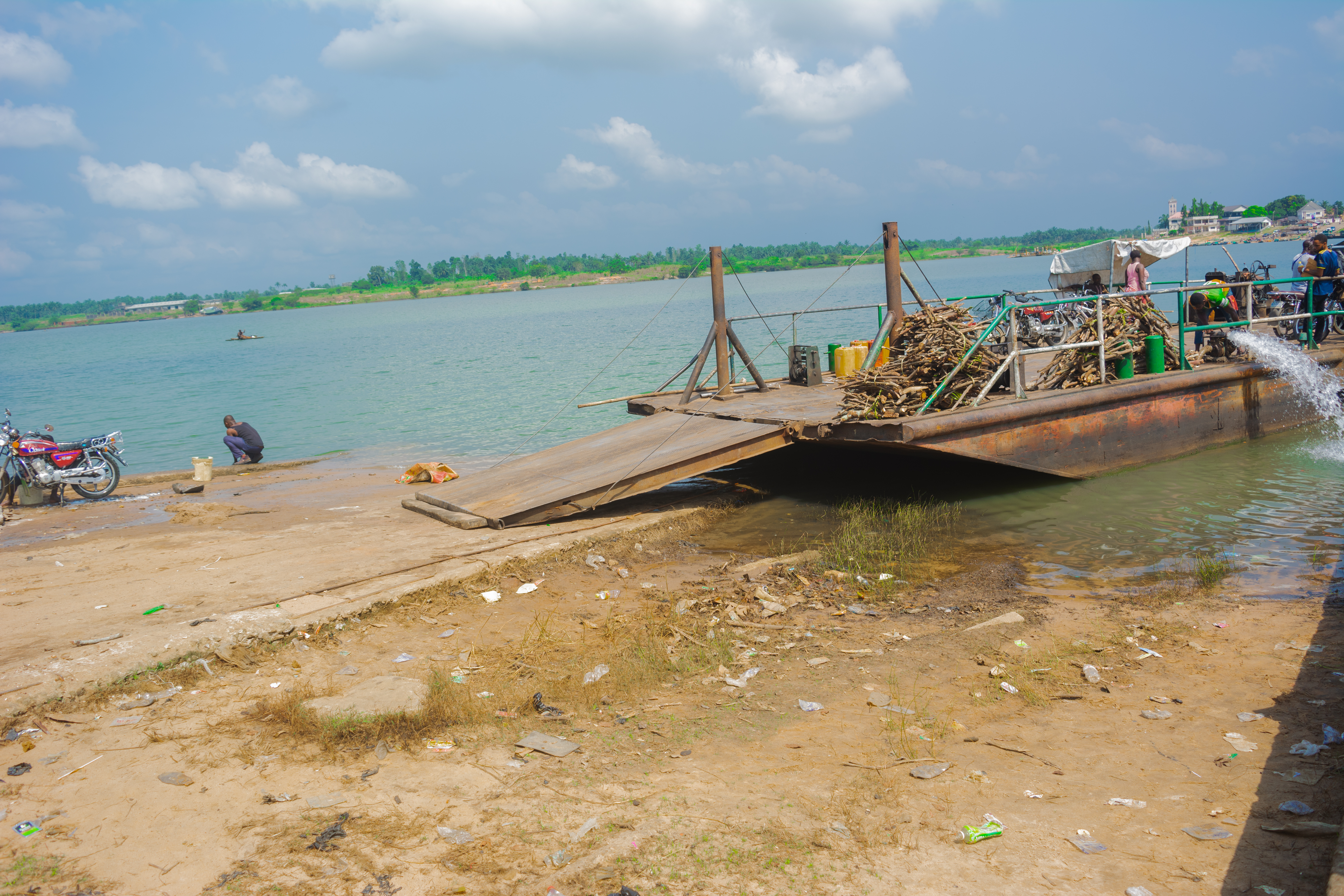
Bank of Oguta Lake showing human activities such as motorcycle washing and transportation of goods and people.

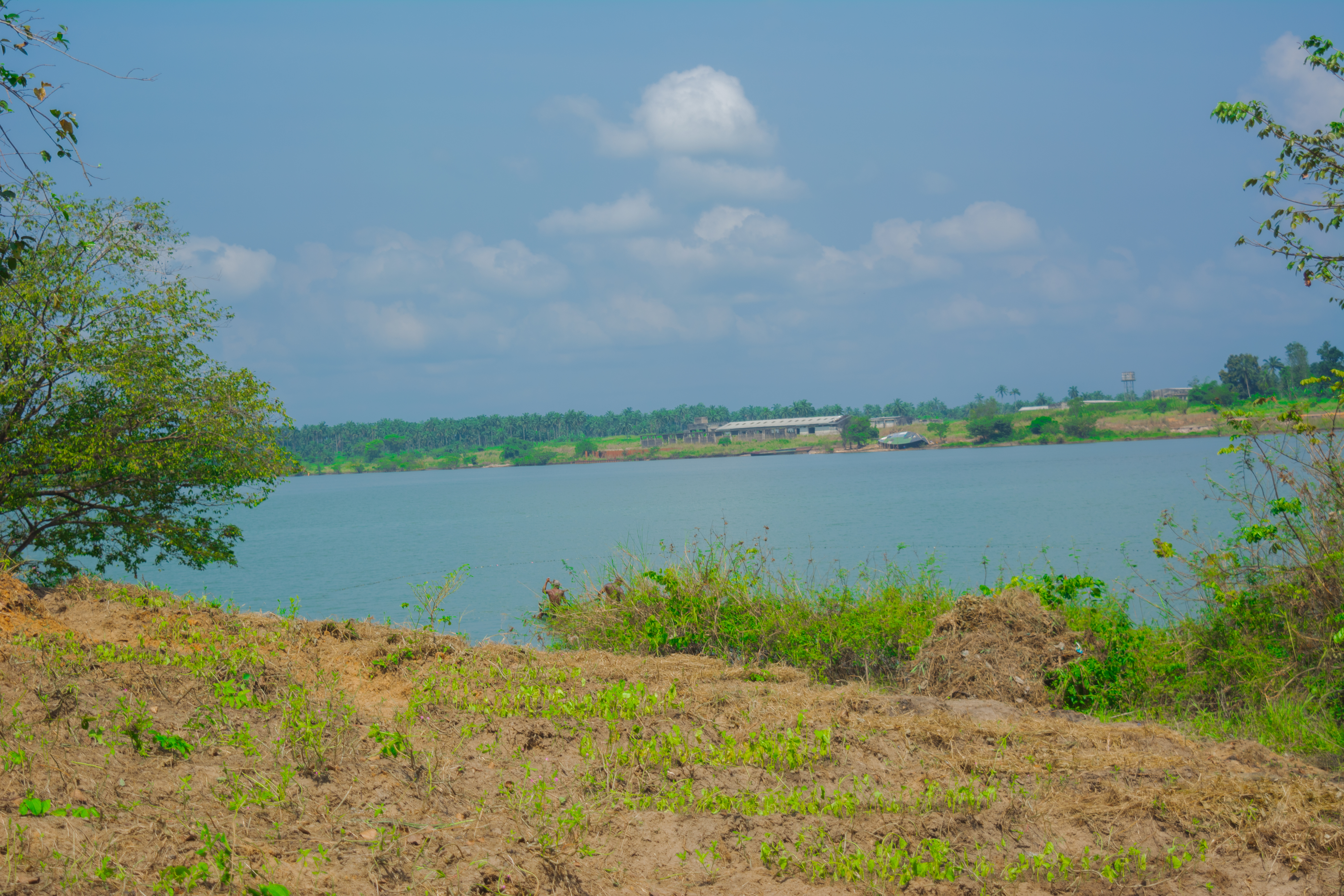
Bank of Oguta Lake showing farmland and vegetation.

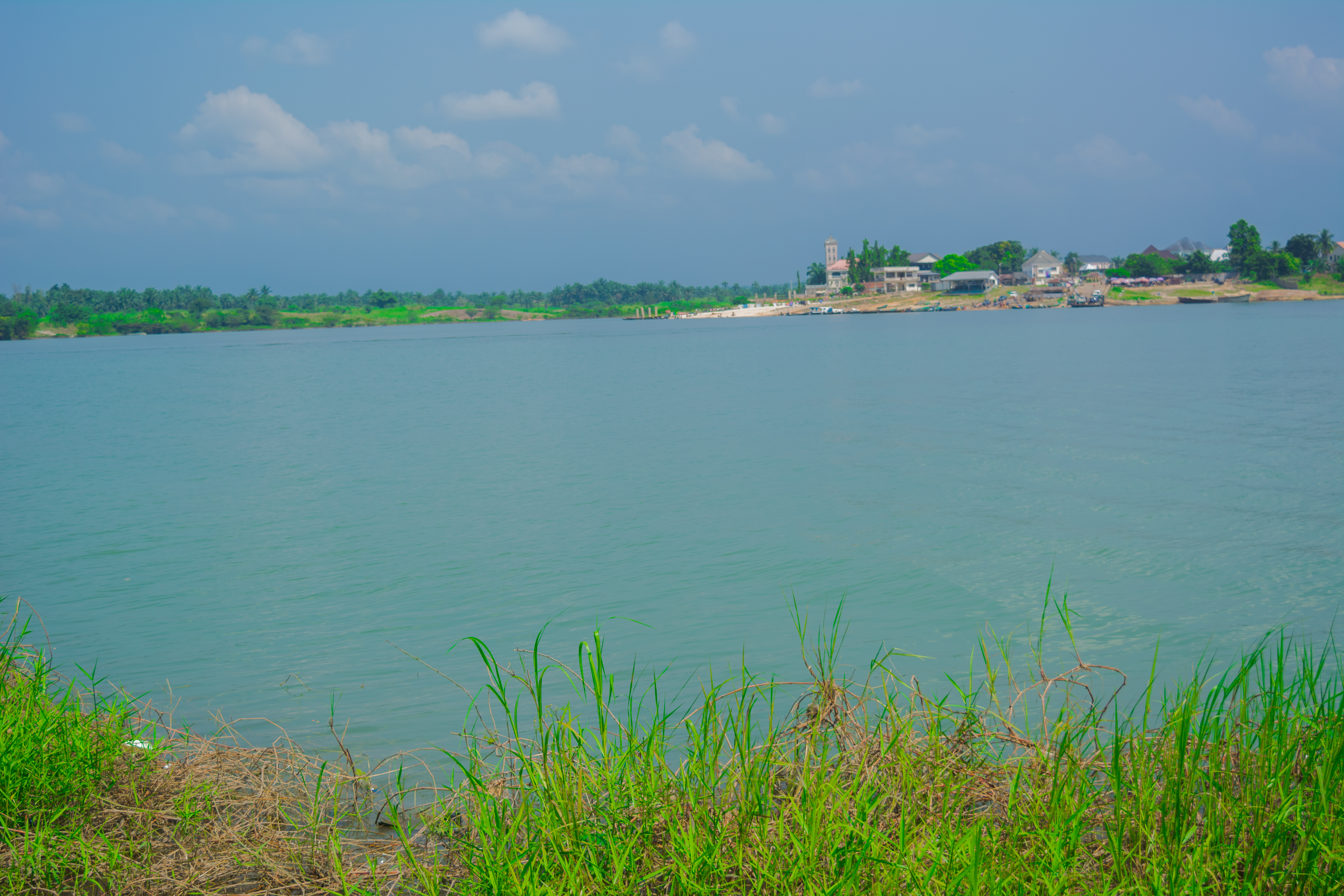
A view of the infrastructure (housing) at the opposite bank of Oguta

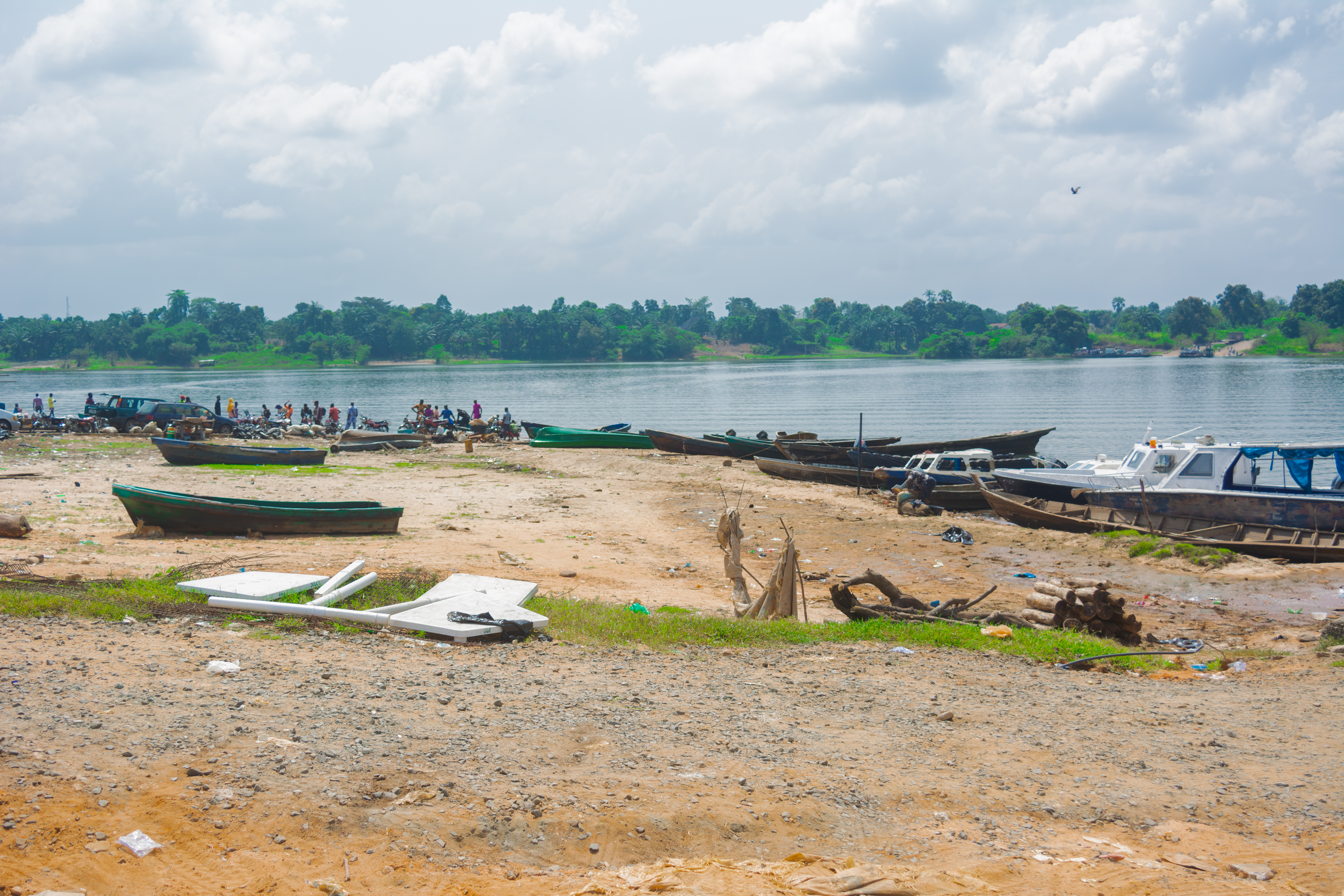
Different means of water transportation such as canoes and speed boat displayed at the sloping point bar of Oguta Lake.

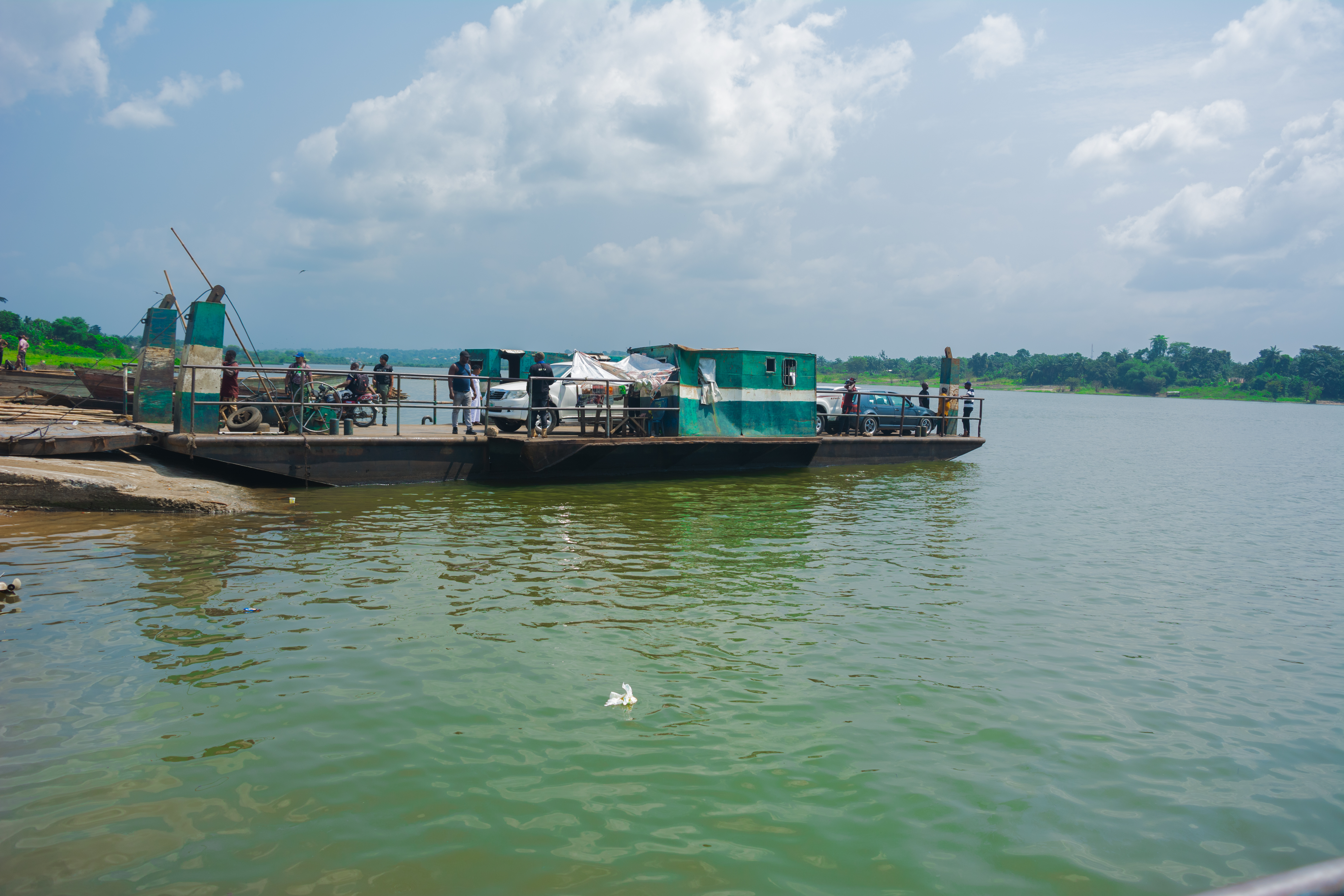
A loaded pontoon (goods, cars and people) at Oguta Lake

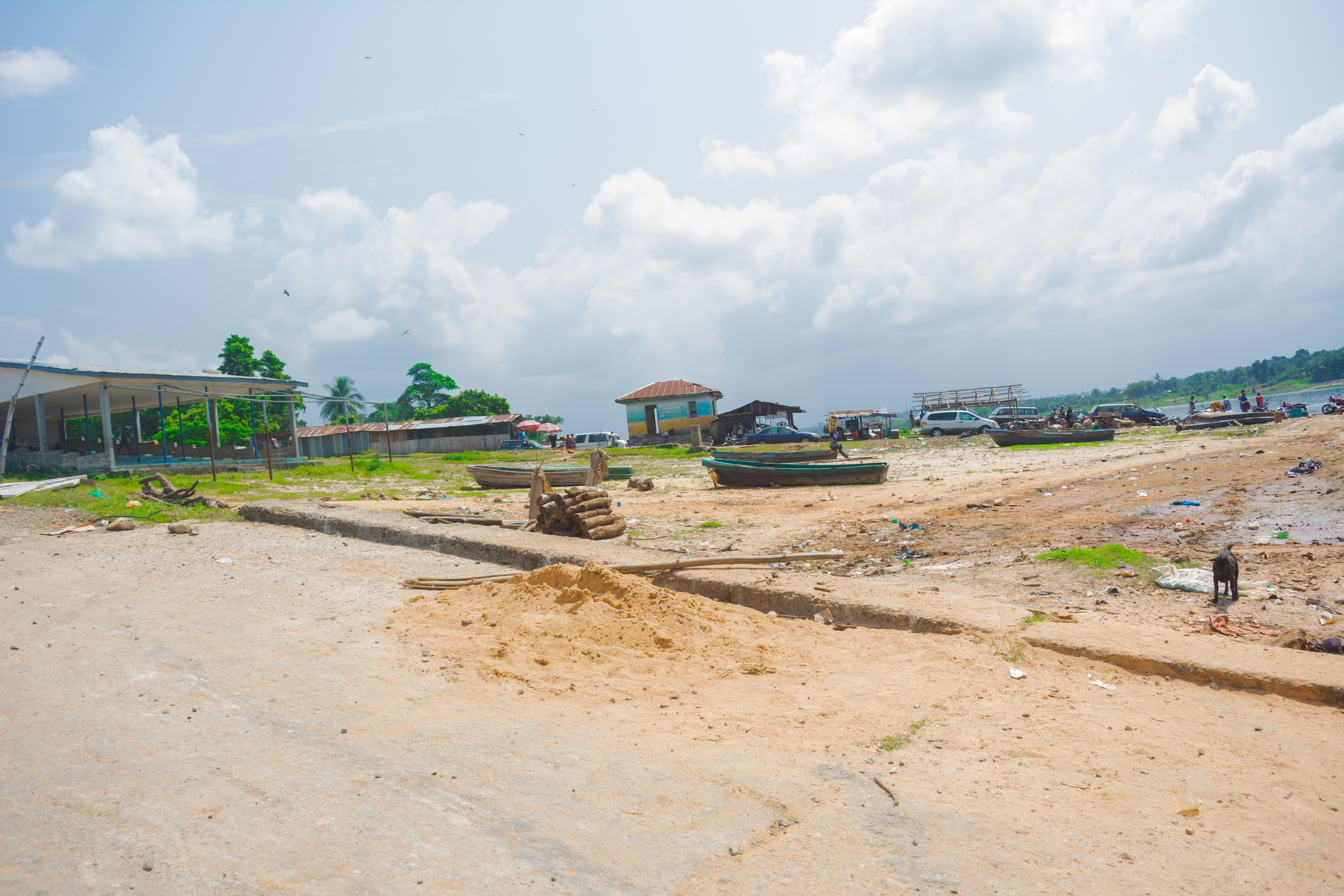
Types of housing structures at Oguta Lake

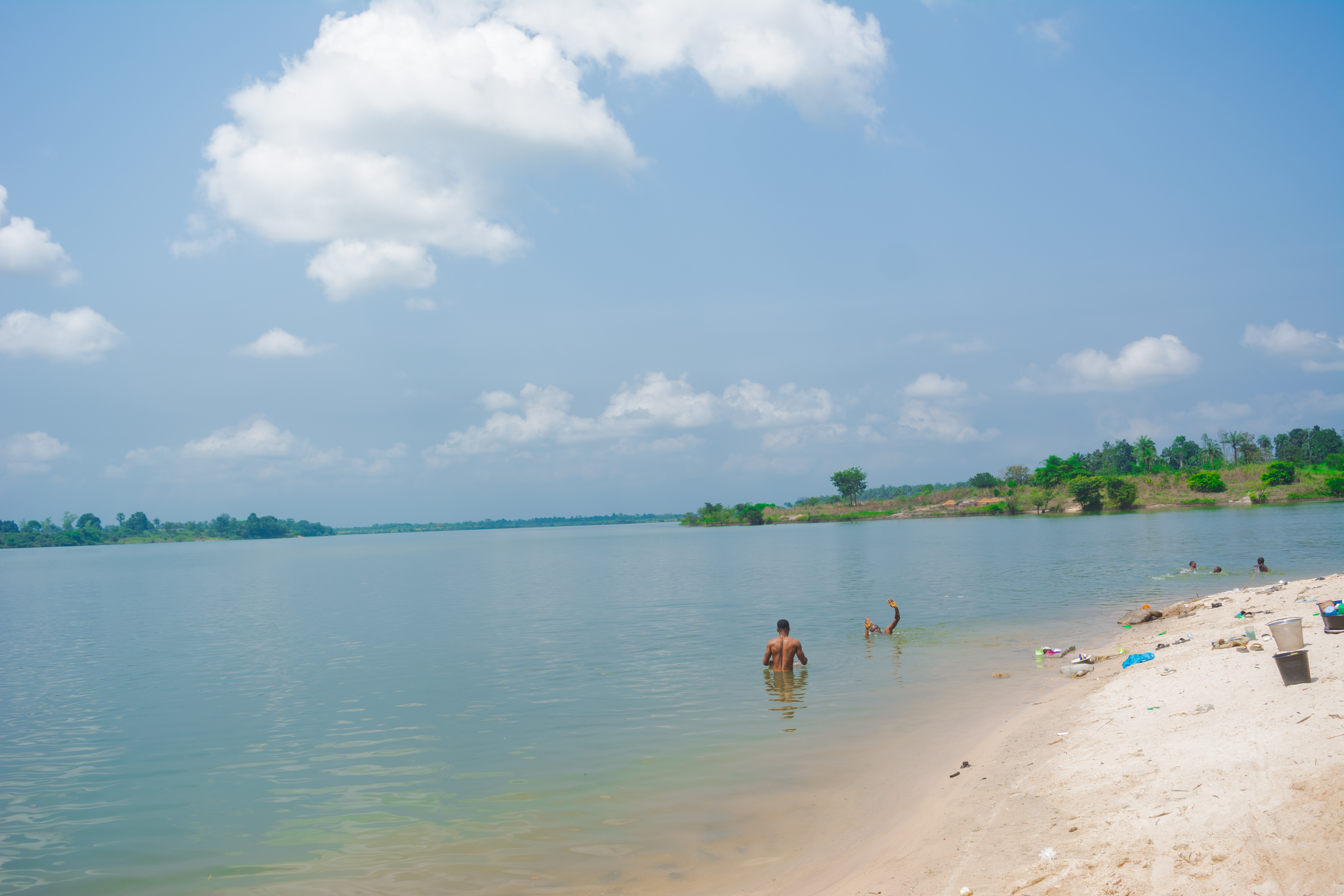
Swimming activity and buckets at Oguta Lake.

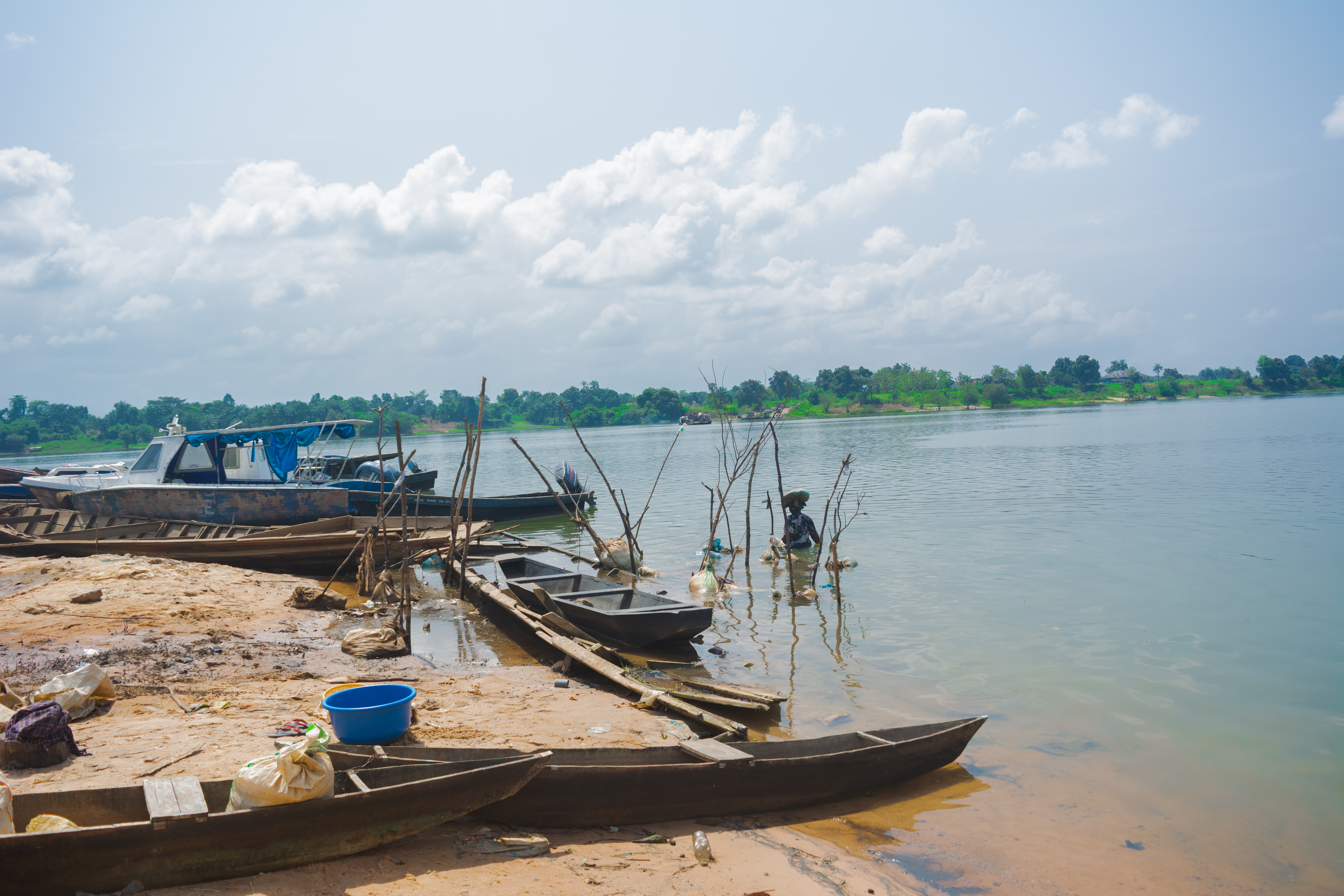
Cassava fermentation process by rural women and canoes at Oguta Lake.
