= Orsu =

- LGA
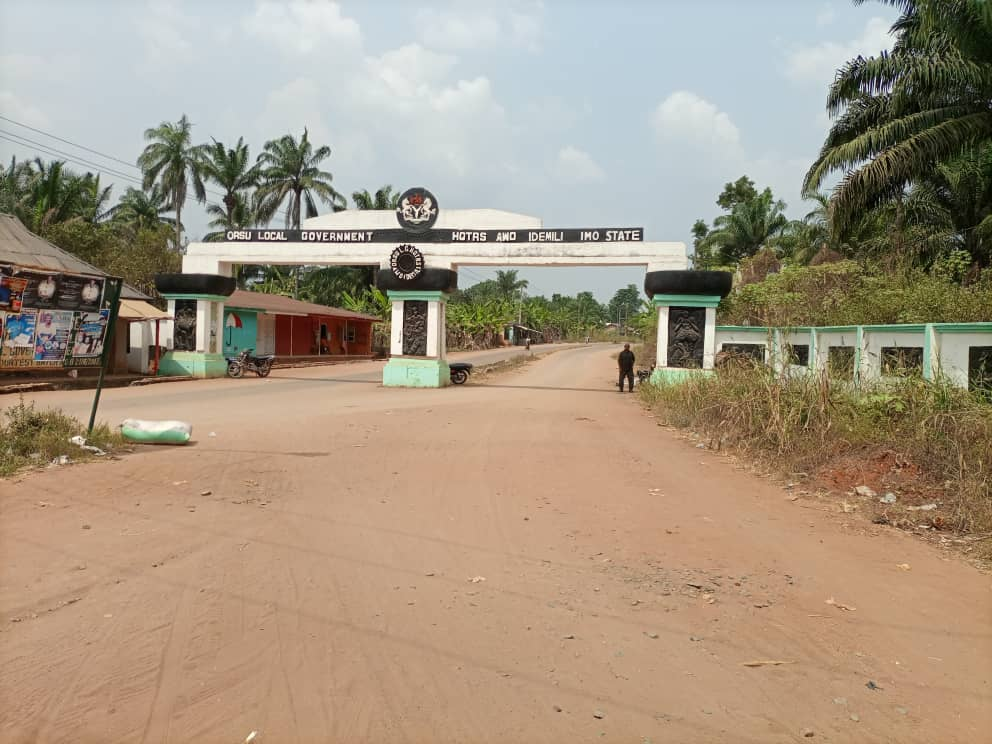
- Orlu Headquarters Entrance
- Motto: Obodo Oma
- Interactive map of Orsu
- Country: Nigeria
- State: Imo State
- Capital: Awo-Idemili

Government
  - Local Government Chairman: Friday Ibakaeme
- Time zone: UTC+1 (WAT)

Orsu// is a local government area (LGA) in the Imo State of Nigeria. Orsu is also the name of the dialect of this people. They are an Igbo people located west of Orlu, north of Oguta and in the general areas around Oru East, Oru West, Ihiala, Nnewi south and Oguta LGAs. Orsu LGA is made up of several autonomous communities including Ihitenansa, Amaruru, Amazu, Amaebu, Amannachi, Awo-Idemili, Asaa Ubirielem, Eziawa, Umuhu Okabia, Orsu Ihiteukwa, Okwu Ufuruaku, Okwu Amaraihe, and Okwu Etiti.

The estimated total population of Orsu LGA is 194,223 with the area mostly inhabited by people from the Igbo ethnic group. The Igbo language is commonly spoken in the LGA while the religion of Christianity is widely practiced in the LGA. Popular festivals in Orsu LGA include the Iri ji festival. Ofeke day celebrations are a yearly celebration held every 1 January and brings visitors to watch the Masquerades. Prominent traditional rulers in the LGA include the:

Obi of Etiti Okabia, Nnachi of Amannachi

They also share distinct seasons which are the dry and the rainy seasons with the area having an average temperature of 27 °C. The LGA hosts a number of streams and rivers and the area has an average humidity level of 64 percent.

Orsu LGA has a rich trade sector with the people of the area engaged in the buying and selling of a plethora of commodities in markets such as the Eke Ubahaze and the Ekeututu markets. The LGA also has a substantial number of its dwellers engaging in farming with the cultivation of crops such as yam, cassava, oil palm, and vegetables.

According to the 2016 census Orsu LGA has a population of 165,600.
