= Njaba River =

River in Nigeria

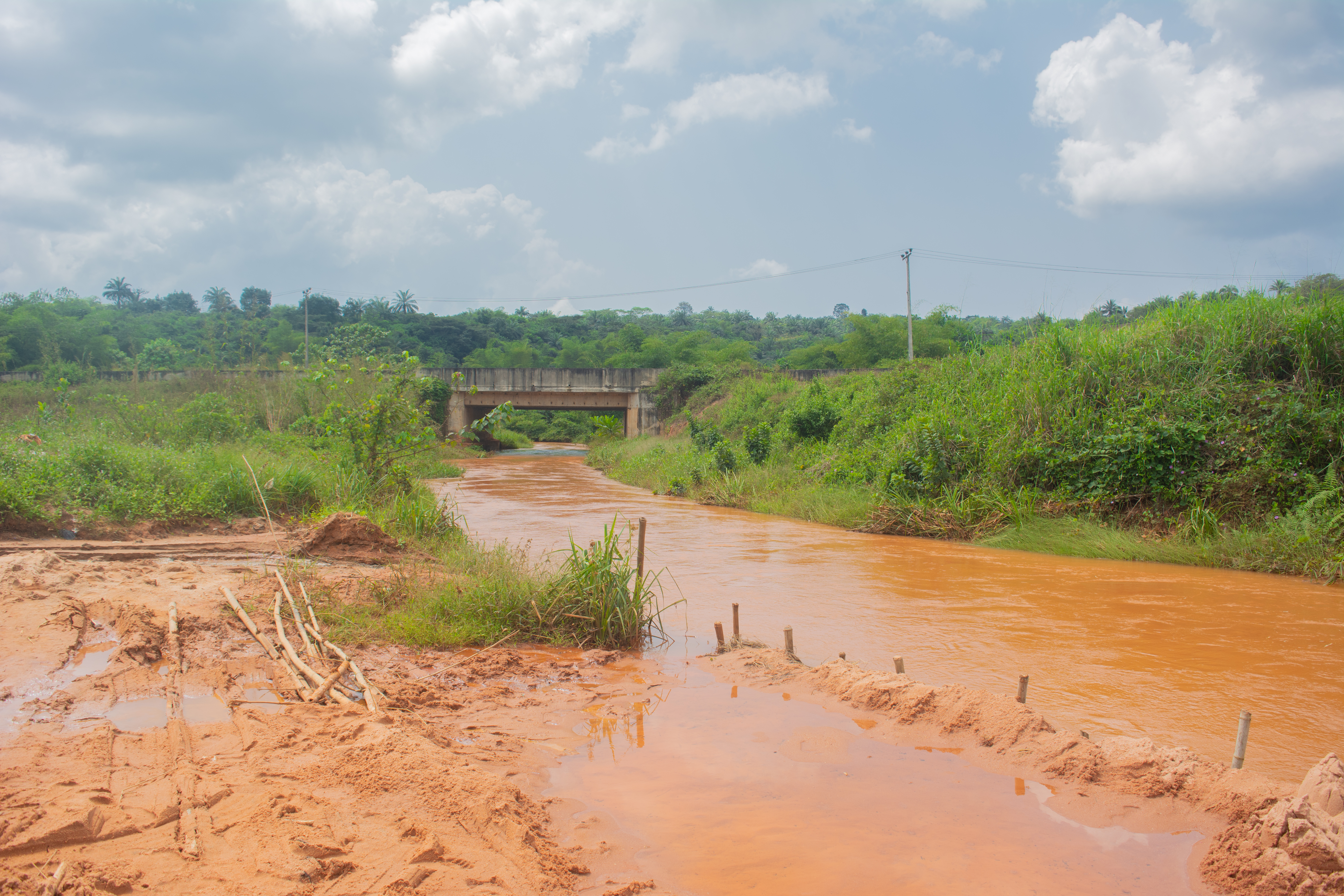
- Showing Njaba River which passes through Umuaka road bridge to Orlu
- Native name: Njaba, Uhammiri, Ughamiri (Igbo)

Location
- Country: Nigeria
- State: Imo State

Physical characteristics
- Source
  - location: Iyi -Eziakwo, Amucha
  - coordinates: 5°43′42″N 7°3′31″E
- Mouth
  - location: Oguta lake
  - coordinates: 5°42′3″N 6°48′28″E
- Basin size: 145.6 km^{2} (56.2 sq mi)
- Discharge
  - average: 1,700 m^{3}/h (17,000 cu ft/ks)

Basin features
- Waterbodies: Oguta Lake
- Mean depth: 4.5 m (15 ft)

Njaba River (also Njaba), in the Niger Delta Basin is a major tributary of Oguta Lake in Nigeria's South East Imo State. With 4.5 m (15 ft) mean depth, the river has a total stream length of 78.2 km, basin area of 145.63 km^{2} (56.23 sq mi) and an average specific discharge of about 1,700 m^{3}/h (17,000 cu ft/ks).

== Flow ==
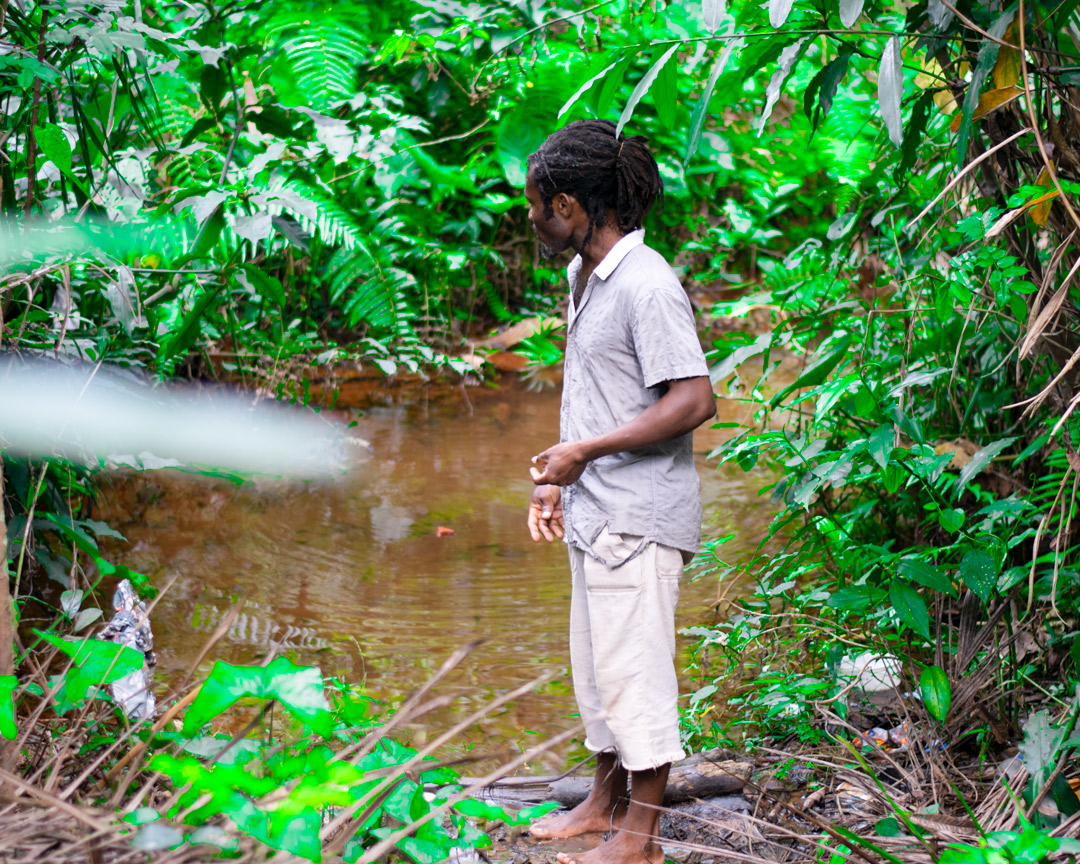
Traditionalist appeasing the spirit/gods of the river

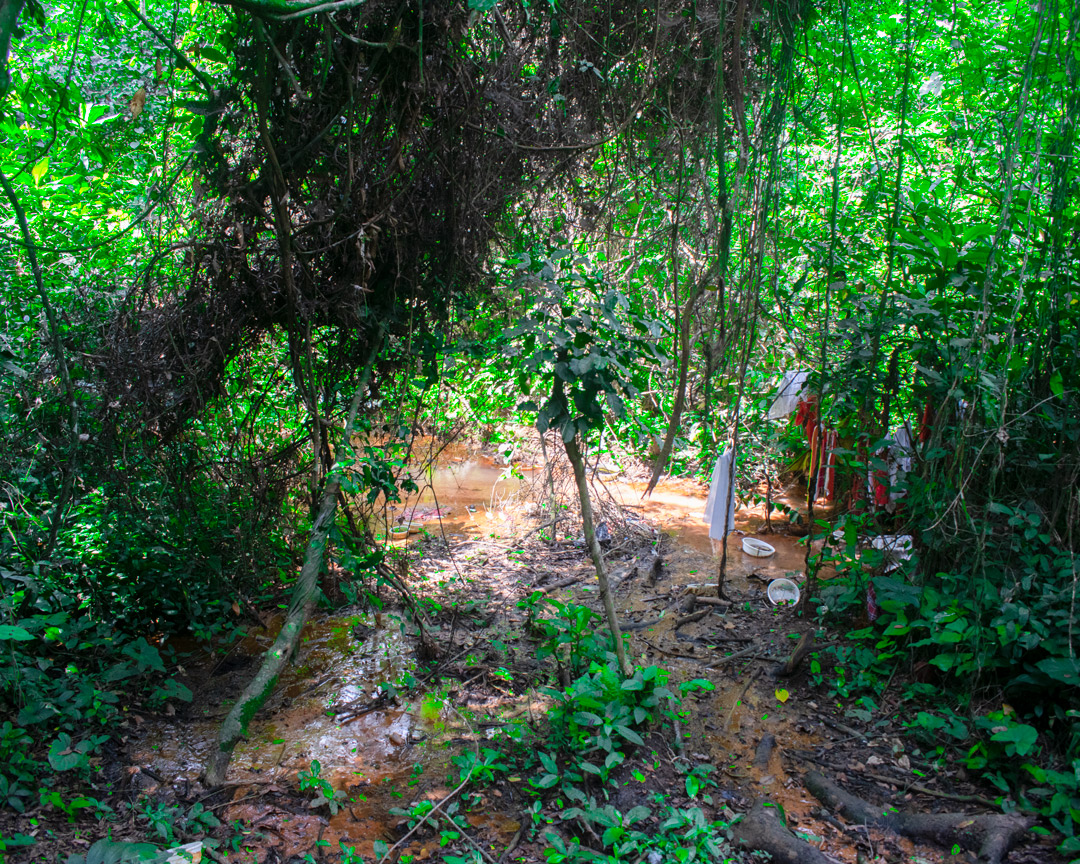
This part of the river is considered sacred to rural dwellers

Njaba flows in an almost east-western direction, taking off from Amucha and Ekwe passing through several towns including Okwudor, Awo-Omamma and Mgbidi before emptying into Oguta Lake.

== Oil and Gas ==
Some of the oil fields in the river basin include Ossu, Izombe and Njaba operated under ChevronTexaco’s OML 53 and Addax Petroleum's OML 124 both in Izombe. OML 124 contains another undeveloped Njaba 2 well onshore Nigeria discovered December 2008 in the town of Awo-Omamma. According to Addax Petroleum, there are also several identified exploration prospects yet to be drilled and tested around Njaba. The field could become one of the company's largest fields in Nigeria. In line with directive of the Federal Government of Nigeria to stop gas flaring by year 2008, a plan has been underway to develop a gas processing plant in the river basin under Izombe Integrated Gas Processing Project.

== Oil Palm Trade ==
Njaba River towns including Oguta, Mgbidi, Osemotor and Awo-Omamma were once important centres of trade. After the abolition of the slave trade in 1830, there was an oil palm tree in the river basin as a source of cash. Oil mill factories were established in many communities including Umuezukwe oil mill located near the waterfront in Awo-omamma. By 1903 exports in the oil trade increased due to new waterways developed to move the products to the coast.

== Economy, Environment, and Infrastructure ==
Fishermen, fish landing sites and fishing cooperatives exist in many Imo State communities; some are found in villages of Awo-Omamma, Oguta, Abiaziem, Nnebukwu, and Nkwesi in the Njaba River basin, including the Udoka Fish Farmers Group, Umuezukwe, Awo-omamma and Kalabari Beach Fishermen Coop. Society, Oguta. Their landing sites include Umuezukwe (Ughamiri), Umudei, K-beach, Osse Abiaziem and Osemotor located in Awo-Omamma and Oguta villages. These farmers experience economic constraints that militate against efficient operation of their fish and crop farming activities.

Intervention is needed to solve many of these infrastructure and environmental issues in the villages of Awo-Omamma, Izombe, Oguta, the greater oil-rich river basin and many other farming communities in Imo State. Assistance is needed in development of motorable access roads to these fishing villages and ports such as Umuezukwe, Ubahaeze, Abiaziem, Izombe et al. as well as in support of modern fish and crop processing activities through electricity generation and agricultural subsidies On Monday, January 28, 2013, angry youths protested the State Government’s insensitivity to plight of their people whose roads linking Awo-omamma to Okwudor and other neighbouring communities, they alleged had been abandoned for years by successive administrations in the state.

Like many other areas of the Niger Delta, the continuous flaring of gases at flow stations constitutes a threat to ambient air in the area.

It is projected that upon completion, Izombe Gas Processing Plant would be a major inland gas processing hub for most stranded gas within Njaba River axis.
