= Akatta =

Akatta Akhan City
- Town
- Nickname: The Beauty of Oru
- Motto: Live Lets Live
- Location in Nigeria
- Coordinates: 5.7770°N 6.9585°E
- Country: Nigeria
- State: Imo
- Local Government Area: Oru East

Population ((2006 census))
  - Total: 54,000
  - Ethnicity: Igbo
  - Religion: Christianity Traditional Beliefs
- Time zone: UTC+1 (WAT)
- Postal code: 474116
- National language: Igbo

Akatta is a major town in Oru East Local Government Area of Imo State in Nigeria. It is bordered to the north west by the towns Nnempi, Akuma and Amagu, to the north east by Amaebu and Amazu, to the south east by Okporo, Umutanze and Atta Njaba, and to the south west by Omuma. The following villages make up Akatta: Akwa, Urah, Ichi-Amaka, Ubaha, Ubahangwu, Okporo, Okwu and Azu Akatta. The town is approximately 10 km (6 mi) west of Orlu.

Akatta has produced at least two members of the Imo state house of Assembly, two permanent secretaries/principal secretaries, professors, among others.

== Ethnicity ==
The majority of the population are Igbo and have Igbo culture.

== Religion ==
Christianity is the dominant religion in Akatta, with a majority of the population in Catholic, followed by Anglican and other Protestants. There is a small minority of Jehovah Witness and other Christian denominations. There are three Roman Catholic parishes, which are all part of the Catholic Diocese of Orlu:

- St. Michael's Catholic Parish Akatta
- St. Martin's Catholic Parish Akwa Akatta
- St. Patrick Catholic Parish Ihitte Akatta

Others:

- Christ Anglican Church Okporo Akatta
- Deeper Christian Life Ministry Akatta
- Assemblies of God Church, Akwa Akatta

== Education ==
Akatta has one public secondary school, over six public primary schools and a number of private schools. The public schools include:

- Akatta Secondary School, Akatta
- Akwa Primary School (also known as Central School Ihitte Akatta)
- Urah Primary School
- Ichi Primary School
- Central School Akatta
- Ubaha Primary School
- Community Primary School Okporo Akatta

The private schools include:

- JJSS commercial school Ubahangwu Akatta
- Fr.Justin International Secondary School Uzii/Amankwo Akatta
- Obieze Commercial school Urah Akatta

=== Notable people ===
- Chief Vincent I.Onyenorah(former GM of First Bank instrumental to first bank branch in Akatta
- Sir Val Obieze (former Accountant General Imo state.)
- Barr Greg Okemmili (Former member Imo House of Assembly
- Ichie Boniface Ogunjiofor( Former member Imo House of Assembly)
- Hon Anthony Obieze(Former member Imo House of Assembly)
- Engr Cosmas Onyenorah (Former GM National Oil)
- Sir Ben C. Igwe (Assistant Inspector General of Police)
- Ichie Cosmas Anozie (Former principal secretary to the Governor of Imo state)
- Ichie Boniface Akuazaoku (former MD/CEO ABC Merchant Bank)

== Commerce ==
- Firstbank of Nigeria Plc Akatta Branch
- GreenField MicroFinance Bank

=== Markets ===
- Afor Akatta (the major market in Akatta)
- Nkwo Akwa (an evening mini-market)

=== Tourism ===
- Okporo Monkey Forest Reserve
- Ichi-Amaka Monkey colony reserve

=== Festival ===
- The New Yam Festival
- End of year Football Competition, amongst others.
