= Jean Claude Gandur =

French-born Swiss businessman (born 1949)

- Born: 18 February 1949 (age 77); Grasse, France
- Education: University of Lausanne and Pantheon-Sorbonne University
- Occupation: Businessman
- Known for: Former Chairman and CEO of Addax Petroleum

Jean Claude Gandur (born 18 February 1949) is a French-born Swiss businessman, philanthropist and art collector.

== Early life ==
Gandur was born in Grasse, France in 1949. He spent his childhood in Alexandria, Egypt until the age of 12, when his family moved to Switzerland. Gandur studied law and political science at the University of Lausanne and history at Pantheon-Sorbonne University.

== Career ==
In 1976, Gandur joined raw materials trader Philipp Brothers (later Phibro) and worked for the company's Zug subsidiary for eight years. In 1987, Gandur founded the Addax and Oryx Group (AOG) which focused on oil production in Africa, primarily Nigeria. He was chairman and CEO of Addax Petroleum until its takeover by Sinopec Group in August 2009 for US$7.3 billion.

His new Toronto-listed oil company Oryx Petroleum held its IPO in 2013, and it is developing large oilfields in Iraqi Kurdistan. As of March 2015, his net worth was estimated at $2.1 billion.

In July 2020, Gandur resigned from the board of directors at Oryx Petroleum, following a change in control.

Gandur was named Commander of the National Order of Benin, has a diplomatic passport from Senegal, and was the honorary consul for the Republic of Congo in Geneva for ten years.

== Art ==
In 2018, Gandur was part of the jury for the Marcel Duchamp Prize. Gandur, who works with international organizations as an art collector, participated in an interview regarding the correct provenance of objects for sale in April 2018.

In January 2019, Gandur, together with other private donors and some countries, made a donation totalling USD 75,5 million for the safeguarding of cultural heritage sites in Iraq and Mali.

=== Gandur Art Foundation ===
Alongside ancient Greek and Roman works, Jean Claude Gandur's collection of Egyptian antiquities is one of the largest in the world still in private hands. The Fondation Gandur pour l'Art also manages his modern art collection of post-war European paintings.

In March 2010, Gandur made a commitment to the city of Geneva to invest 20 million Swiss francs in the renovation and expansion of the Musée d'Art et d'Histoire de Genève.

In 2011, Gandur's collection of post-war European paintings, the second biggest collection of its kind worldwide, was exhibited at the Musée Rath in Geneva and the Musée Fabre in Montpellier. The exhibitions included works by Pierre Soulages, Georges Mathieu, Hans Hartung and Gérard Schneider.

In February 2016, a project by Jean Nouvel to enlarge the Musée d'Art et d'Histoire de Genève was rejected in a referendum, and Gandur withdrew from the project.

Gandur started a four-year contest to decide in which city he would build a museum for his collection. He pledged around 30 Million Euro for an "architecturally outstanding building on a central urban site." By the end of 2022, sites in Bordeaux, Strasbourg, Annecy, Rouen, Fessenheim, Arles and Caen were in the running. Bordeaux, Strasbourg and Caen were finalists for the project, and in May 2024, the foundation announced Caen had been chosen.

== Legal Affairs ==
Since 2009, a lawsuit has been pending between Gandur and Vincent Mangeat, the architect who oversaw the construction of the Villa Gandur in Tannay completed in 2006. One of the elements of the lawsuit is the failure of an air-conditioning unit, which damaged the collection of ancient works.

In 2015, following the publication of an article on the debate on renovations of the Musée d'Art et d'Histoire in the Geneva daily Le Courrier, Gandur filed court proceedings for defamation and slander, and civil proceedings for breach of honor against the publishing journalist. The criminal complaint for defamation was dropped in July 2019. However, the action for protection of personality was pursued further. In November 2021, the Federal Supreme Court confirmed that the newspaper had damaged Gandur's reputation. Le Courrier was ordered remove the article and pay almost 50,000 Swiss francs. The newspaper referred the case to the European Court of Human Rights in 2022.

In 2022, Gandur filed charges against unknown after discovering that the provenance of a Fayum mummy portrait he had acquired from the Pierre Bergé Foundation had potentially been faked.

== Private life ==
In 2015, Gandur relocated from London to Malta. He is divorced, has a son and three grandchildren.

== Personal fortune ==
Since 2008, Gandur's name has appeared on the Forbes' list of the world's wealthiest people. In 2011, he was ranked as the seventh richest person in Switzerland. In 2015, he had an estimated net worth of USD 2.1 billion.
