= Nkwesi =

Village in Imo state, Nigeria

Nkwesi is a village in southeastern Nigeria. It is located near the city of Owerri.
