= Tony Nsofor =

Nigerian painter

- Born: Tony; May 3, 1973 (age 53); Oguta
- Other name: Anthony Chukwudinma Richard Nsofor
- Citizenship: Nigeria
- Education: Nsukka (UNN)
- Alma mater: University of Nigeria
- Occupation: painter
- Employer: Whitesands School

Tony Nsofor (born 1973), is a Nigerian painter. His full name is Anthony Chukwudinma Richard Nsofor.

== Biography ==
Tony Nsofor was born on May 3, 1973, in Oguta, Nigeria. He attended Assumpta Nursery School; Shell Camp Primary School; and FUTO Staff School (all in Owerri, Imo State, southeastern Nigeria) for his nursery and elementary education.

He attended Holy Ghost College, Owerri, before moving to Government College, Owerri to study for two terms. His parents later moved him to Federal Government College, Okigwe to complete his secondary education. At Okigwe, he was president of the Fine Arts Club for most of the time he was a student. In 1991, he gained admission to study Fine and Applied Arts at the University of Nigeria, Nsukka (UNN) in Enugu State and majored in Painting.

After graduation, he worked with Comet Newspapers for a year before going into full-time studio practice. In 2008, he worked part-time for a year as an art instructor at Whitesands School, Lagos, Nigeria. He left the teaching job at Whitesands School to dedicate more time to studio practice as an artist and photographer.

== Exhibitions ==
Tony Nsofor has featured widely in group exhibitions in Nigeria and abroad. Some of them are: "6 new painters from Nsukka 1997"The British Council, Enugu, The Orthopaedic Series, National Orthopaedic Hospital, Lagos, Nigeria, 2004 'The Rediscovery of Tradition: Uli and the Politics of Culture, a touring art exhibition curated by Professor C. Krydz Ikwuemesi. The exhibition opened at Pendulum Gallery, Lagos, and went to Enugu, Nigeria and Worcester, South Africa between Jan. 22-March 25, 2005. " 'A Glimpse into Nigerian Art' " Cheikh Anta Diop Univ., Senegal, 2006. "With a Human Face" Pan-African University, Lagos, 2008, "Afrika Heritage 2006: The 6th Biennale of the Pan-African Circle of Artists" "Art for hope", The Grind Gallery, Los Angeles, 2008, 'Autobiography and Beatitudes, Pan-African University, Lagos 2012 "Recent works- Tony Nsofor & Ibe Ananaba", Temple Muse, Lagos, Nov. 2015 curated by SMO Contemporary Art "SMO Contemporary Art Booth 9, ARTX Lagos Fair, Civic Centre, Nigeria,2017 "Integration 4", Dak’Art OFF group exhibition, Fondation Sonatel, Senegal, 2018 'Ballot Boxes and Beasts of Power', Galerie d'Art Houkami Guyzagn, Côte d'Ivoire, Sept. 2018 "Relational Lines: The Disjunction of Sameness"O'DA Art gallery, LagosNovember 2021

== Writings ==
"ART — Conceptualism: What is the idea?", article in 234Magazine "Nigeria / Roots: Contemporary Artists from Nigeria" ed. Benetton, Luciano (et al), Crocetta del Montello: Fabrica, 2015 "Contemporary Nigerian Art in Lagos Private Collections: New Trees in an Old Forest". Jess Castellote ed. Gloucestershire: Bookcraft Limited, 2012. "The Rediscovery of Tradition: Uli and the Politics of Culture", C. Krydz Ikwuemesi & Emeka Agbayi, eds. Pendulum Centre for Culture and Development, 2005
