= Sylvanus Adiewere Nsofor =

Nigerian jurist (1935–2020)

Sylvanus Adiewere Nsofor (17 March 1935 – 10 December 2020) was a Nigerian jurist who served as Nigeria's ambassador to the US from November 2017 to December 2020.

== Early life ==
Justice Sylvanus Nsofor was born on 17 March 1935, in Oguta, Imo State, Nigeria.

== Education ==
He graduated from London's now-defunct Holborn College of Law in 1962 and added an LL.M from the London School of Economics in 1964.

== Career ==
He began teaching at Holborn College of Law in 1964 and went into private practice in 1965. In 1977, he was appointed to the bench in Nigeria and served as a judge of the Imo state High Court. After fifteen years on the bench, he was eventually appointed a Justice in the Nigerian Court of Appeal and served for thirteen years until his mandatory retirement in 2005.

In 2003, Nsofor gave the dissenting vote in a three-justice panel in the contested presidential race between Muhammadu Buhari, presidential candidate of the All Nigeria Peoples Party (ANPP), and the incumbent candidate of the People's Democratic Party (PDP), Olusegun Obasanjo. Nsofor wrote that the PDP had engaged in intimidation and violence: “I find that the substantial non-compliance with the mandatory electoral law amounts to no election. I also find that there was violence perpetuated by President Obasanjo...May Nigeria never and never again see a black Saturday like April 19, 2003.” However, Obasanjo was confirmed as president for a second term despite Nsofor's objections.

Twelve years later, Muhammadu Buhari won election as president of Nigeria; he eventually nominated Justice Nsofor as a non-career ambassador, and Nsofor was confirmed on 7 June 2017. He assumed office as the ambassador to the US on November 13, 2017, succeeding Professor Adebowale Adefuye.

== Personal life ==
Nsofor was married to Mrs Jean Nsofor and had three children.

== Death ==
He died in a hospital in Maryland, U.S.A., on 10 December 2020 after a brief illness. He was 85 years old.
