= Ekwe Community =

The historical origin of Ekwe is based on oral myth and legend of tradition of common ancestors passed from generation to generation. According to this oral tradition -"Nnamike Onuoma", the founder of the Ekwe community had two sons -Ekwe and Okwudor. Okwudor later separated from his brother and settled at the other side of the Njaba River and founded the Okwudor community. Ekwe stayed put in the area, which is now known as Ekwe.

Ekwe and Okwudor conjointly worshipped the common ancestral god of their fore-fathers (Eziekwo) and commonly performed Ozo title ceremonies together until recently. An accident on the bridge crossing the Njaba River led to the death of Nze and Ozo title holders. This led to the separation in performance of the Ozo title, between Ekwe and Okwudor. Today, people still pay homage and perform sacrificial rituals at Eziakwo shrine, their common ancestral deity.

Ekwe had two sons named Ekwe-Nwe-Orie and Ekwe-Nwe-Nkwo, along with fourteen grandsons. No definite information is known about the number of wives, daughters and granddaughters he had, however it is assumed that Ekwe had two wives. Ekwe-Nwe-Orie is the Diokwara (first son) of Ekwe from his first wife and Ekwe-Nwe-Nkwo is the second son of Ekwe and the first son of the second wife of Ekwe.

Ekwe-Nwe-Orie had SIX sons that later gave rise to SIX villages. The villages are Umudibi, Ibeama, Umuduru, Eluama, Obara, and Ebenano. Ekwe-Nwe-Nkwo had SIX sons that also gave rise to seven villages. The villages are (in order of seniority) Umuduruewuru, Eziekwe, Eluama, Umuduruehie, Odicheku, Umukorokoro and Umuokwara

Eluama, Umuduruewuru, Umukorokoro later crossed the Iyi Abalaka stream to discover a land mass later called Okwuotiri. The three villages founded the Eke market. Today they are collectively known as Ebenator-Ekwe. Eziekwe, Umuduruehie, Odicheku and Umuokwara are now known as Uburu Ekwe.

== Location and geography ==
Ekwe is located in the southern part of Isu local government area of Imo state. The town lies on an undulated plain, with a natural boundary caused by the flow of the Njaba River. The Njaba River separates the town from Amucha, Okwudor and some parts of Umuaka.

There exists a stream - (Iyi -Eziakwo)(Isi iyi )(iyi Oba) which started as a spring from the thick Eziakwo forest rocks. It separates Ekwe-Nwe-Kwo (Uburu Ekwe) from Okwudor and finally gives rise to Iyi Agu, Iyi Abala and Njaba River.

Ekwe is bounded on the north by Nkume and Amucha, on the south by Amurie, on the west by Okwudor and Umuaka and on the east by Isu Njaba and Amandugba.[2] Ekwe covers an area of 6.4 square kilometres.

== Government and politics ==
Ekwe used to be one politically monolithic autonomous community with the headquarters at Umudibi. Ekwe was split into three autonomous communities by Achike Udenwa administration during the creation of autonomous community by the administration. Ekwe has three politically autonomous communities – Ekwe-Nwe-Orie, Uburu -Ekwe and Ebenator.

Ekwe-Nwe-Orie autonomous community is made of Umudibi, Ibeoma, Umuduru, Eluama, Obara, Umudiwoha and Ebanano and the headquarters is at Umudibi. Eze Charles Chukwuemeka Anyakudo who was enthroned in May 2014 is the current traditional ruler of Ekwe-Nwe-Orie.

Uburu Ekwe is made up of Eziekwe, Umuduruehie, Odicheku and Umuokwara and its headquarters is at Eziekwe. Ibekwe is the traditional ruler of Uburu Ekwe.

Ebenator Ekwe is made up of Eluama, Umuduruewuru and Umukorokoro. Eze Remigius Nwokeforo- Ejirijiegbu III of Ebenator Ekwe is the traditional ruler of Ebenator. He was secretary of Nigeria Disabled Federation.

== Demography ==
The population of Ekwe community is a predominantly rural settlement. It has a high population density and the estimated census population is put at about 56,000. This high population density has led to intensified pressure on land, forests and other natural resources, leading to increasing rural poverty which is characteristic of densely populated rural areas. Fallow period rarely exceeds one year and in some areas continuous cropping is the rule. Low crop yield and loss of land to erosion have combined to induce people to migrate in search of jobs and even farmland in other parts of the state or country in search of greener pastures.

== Occupation ==
The people of Ekwe are mostly subsistence farmers and traders but on the increase, as development takes place - there is a higher number of civil servants, teachers, and professionals such as lawyers, engineers etc.

Agricultural activities in the town include crop farming, economic tree planting and animal rearing. The principal crops include yams, cocoyam, cassava, three-leaved yams, maize, melon-fluted pumpkin and a variety of vegetables. The economic plants include – oil palm trees, coconut palms, pears, banana, breadfruit, plantains, pineapples, ukpo, etc. Animal rearing is mostly free-range system and farm animals such as poultry, goat, sheep and ram are usually kept.

The agricultural produce and by-products such as palm oil, palm kernels, coconuts fruits and various animals, e.g., goats, sheep, fowls, eggs, etc. are taken to the Orie Ekwe Market on Orie Market Day or neighboring communities markets e.g. Afor Umuaka and Nkwo Ihitte to be sold.

== Religion ==
There is freedom of worship in the community and religion occupies a central place in the lives of the people. Before the advent of Christianity, the people practiced traditional religions. With the advent of Christianity, the people are now predominantly Christians of different denominations but mostly Catholics and Anglican. Catholics and Anglican churches are still being considered as the official church in most villages in the town. Recently other Christian denominations have been gaining ground in the town. Some people in the town still practice African Traditional religions.

== Tourism and hospitality ==
Ekwe tourist attractions include a number of natural springs located in Ekwe community. Uburu Ekwe and Ebenator springs are some of the notable spring sites. These springs are noted for their natural flowing Spring (water) . About 30 years ago, the people of Ekwe community constructed a big slab at the Ishiyi with pipes to draw their drinking water. The evidence collected from here throws more lights on the past and ancient culture.
