= Osemotor =

Ancient river port in Nigeria

Ossemotor Elu-Igbo
- Villa
- Location within Nigeria
- Coordinates: 5°42′46″N 6°47′32″E
- Country: Nigeria
- State: Imo State
- LGA: Oguta LGA
- Time zone: UTC+1 (WAT)
  - Summer (DST): not observed
- Postcode: 464...

Ossemotor (also Enu-Igbo) is an ancient river port and park on the bank of the lean 'finger-like' Oguta Lake in Imo State, southeastern Nigeria. Known for its rich history of commerce, Ossemotor was a strategic economic centre in the Eastern Region of Nigeria. Occupying approximately 46.50 square kilometres (17.95 sq mi), it is a part of the Oguta metropolis. Ossemotor was used for the sale and shipment of goods.

Osemotor is a farming and fishing community in Oguta LGA. International Marine University has been proposed for Osemotor to help unlock the economic potentials of the port.

The Osemotor has in the past, faced pollution due to pipeline vandalism and oil explosions in the region.
