= Addax Petroleum =

Oil and gas production company

- Type: Private
- Industry: Petroleum industry
- Founded: 1994
- Key people: Youghong Chen, Managing Director
- Products: Petroleum, Oil & Gas
- Owner: Sinopec
- Website: Addax Petroleum

Addax Petroleum was established in 1994 and since August 2009 has been a subsidiary of the Sinopec Group, one of the largest oil and gas producers in China, the biggest oil refiner in Asia, and the third largest worldwide. Addax Petroleum was an international gas and oil production and exploration company mainly focused on the Middle East, the North Sea, and Africa. Since its founding, the company has become one of the largest oil producers in West Africa.

== History ==
Addax Petroleum was originally part of the Addax & Oryx Group of Companies (AOG) which was founded in 1987. In 1989, AOG embarked on an ambitious expansion programme with the aim of becoming a vertically integrated oil company focused on the African continent. This led to the creation of Addax Petroleum in 1994 by Marc Lorenceau, a partner from the AOG trading group. Addax's initial steps in the upstream business was the acquisition of the Espoir field offshore Ivory Coast that had been relinquished by Phillips Petroleum Company in 1988. Four years later, Addax Petroleum sold its remaining equity in the Espoir field to CNR (Canadian Natural Resources). During the decrease in the price of oil in 1998, Ashland Oil Nigeria's assets were up for sale. Perenco appeared to be the best bidder for Ashland's assets. However, the bidding process was overturned and these assets were awarded to Addax Petroleum for the official amount of twenty million US dollars.

After the death of Mr. Lorenceau in a ski accident in late 2001, Jean Claude Gandur was appointed as the company's Chairman and CEO before its takeover by the Sinopec Group in August 2009. Following the takeover, Mr. Geng Xianglang was appointed CEO, followed by Mr. Zhang Yi in 2010.

In 2017, Addax agreed to pay 31 million Swiss francs to the Swiss Federal Office of Justice in order to settle allegations over suspected bribery of foreign officials in Nigeria. Following an investigation by the Swiss criminal authorities, Addax's CEO and Legal Director were both charged for suspected violations of the Foreign Bribery Act. Sufficient evidence was not gathered over the legality of the payments and no criminal intent was established.

On 31 January 2023, the four major oil mining blocks associated with Addax's production sharing contract (PSC) in Nigeria were formally acquired by The Nigerian National Petroleum Corporation (NNPC) Limited. The acquisition included an exit agreement, transfer settlement, and agreement that Addax will cease to retain the PSC contract for its four major oil mining leases in Nigeria.

=== Chronology ===
- 1994: Addax Petroleum founded. PSC for Espoir field in Ivory Coast
- 1998: Acquisition of Ashland Nigeria assets. Company average production of 8,800 barrels (1,400 m^{3}) of oil per day
- 1999: First drilling campaign in OML 123, offshore Nigeria
- 2000: OML 123 Ebuguu Northeast discovery, offshore Nigeria
- 2001: OML 123 Adanga South discovery, offshore Nigeria. Death of founder Marc Lorenceau.
- 2002: Company average production of 40,000 barrels (6,400 m^{3}) of oil per day. Ngosso Concession Agreement signed, offshore Cameroon
- 2003: OML 123 Oron West & North discoveries, offshore Nigeria. OML 124 drilling campaign, onshore Nigeria
- 2005: Addax is incorporated in Canada
- Company average production of 75,000 barrels (11,900 m^{3}) of oil per day. First Oil in OPL90 (OML 126) Okwori field, offshore Nigeria. 3 PSCs signed in the Nigeria/São Tomé & Principe Joint Development Zone (JDZ). Farm-in Agreement signed on Taq Taq field, Kurdistan Region of Iraq (KRI)
- 2006: Listing on the Toronto Stock Exchange (TSX). Acquisition of Pan Ocean Energy's assets, onshore and offshore Gabon
- 2007: Company average production of 126,000 barrels (20,000 m^{3}) of oil per day. Addax Petroleum Foundation established. Listing on the London Stock Exchange (LSE)
- 2008: PSC on Iroko licence signed, offshore Cameroon
- 2009: Acquisition of Addax Petroleum by the Sinopec Group. First exports of crude from Taq Taq field, Iraqi Kurdistan
- 2011: Company average production of 140,000 barrels (22,000 m^{3}) of oil per day. Acquisition of Royal Dutch Shell's upstream assets, offshore Cameroon. Sinopec-Addax Petroleum Foundation established
- 2012: Creation of Talisman-Sinopec Energy UK Ltd joint venture company. Acquisition of Total S.A.'s interest in OML 138, deep-offshore Nigeria. Opening of Houston office, United States
- 2013: Addax Petroleum promotes its corporate values, the first of it is "Integrity through Action".
- 2014: OML-138 Total S.A.'s interest acquisition, fails to receive Nigerian's authorities approval.
- 2015: Hit by the collapsing crude oil price and the lack of operational and exploration results, Addax Petroleum releases 70 people at its Geneva offices.
- 2016: Blaming Talisman and Repsol for their poor acquisition of the UK assets, Addax Petroleum seeks a US$5.5 bn arbitration against Talisman and Repsol
- 2016: Addax Petroleum long time external auditor, Deloitte, refuses to certify the company UK branch (APUK)'s balance sheet on suspicious payments from Geneva, the Isle of Man, and in Nigeria.
- 2017: Addax Petroleum's Chief Legal and Chief Executive Officers are arrested in Geneva on corruption of foreign officials charges. Eventually, Addax Petroleum agreed early July to pay 31 million Swiss francs to settle the charges with the Geneva justice department. In August, Addax Petroleum announced the shutting of its offices in Geneva, Houston and Aberdeen, thus releasing 174 people. The closure of these offices is expected to be completed on December 10, and fully effective on December 31, 2017.
- 2021: The Department of Petroleum Resources rescinded Addax licences
- 2021: President Muhammadu Buhari restored the rescinded licences to Addax
- 2023: NNPC Limited acquired the assets of Addax Petroleum's Nigerian PSC
- 2024: At the expiration of Addax Petroleum Gabonese assets of Tsiengui-Obangué, those are transferred to the Gabon Oil Company (GOC)

== Addax Petroleum hydrocarbon production ==
The company's average daily oil production for 2011, was 140,000 bbl/d. Year-to-date average daily oil production as of Q3 2012 was 167,000 barrels (26,600 m^{3}) per day (this figure does not take the Talisman-Sinopec Energy UK nor the OML 138 production figures into account).

As part of its "Vision 500", Addax Petroleum was aiming at reaching an average daily production of 500,000 barrels (79,000 m^{3}) of oil by 2015. Addax Petroleum has never been able to get anywhere close to that production figure.

Addax Petroleum is currently the 2nd largest oil producer in Cameroon, the 4th largest in Gabon. Addax Petroleum used to be the 5th largest in Nigeria.

The TTOPCO Joint Venture company (together with Genel Energy) was the largest oil producer in Iraqi Kurdistan. In 2017, TTOPCO announced a $181-million writedown on the asset value after the auditor McDaniel in February 2017, had evaluated its reserves at 59 million barrels (9.4 million cubic metres), compared to 172 million bbl (27.3 million m^{3}) at 31 December 2015. Addax Petroleum purchased 49% of Talisman UK in 2012, to form the Talisman-Sinopec Energy UK Ltd Joint Venture company, that became Repsol-Sinopec Resources UK in July 2016, and is the 4th largest UK oil producer. The Talisman UK production, that averaged 69,000 barrels (11,000 m^{3}) of oil per day in 2012, continued its decline to be around 52,000 barrels (8,300 m^{3}) of oil per day in 2017.

== Asset growth ==
Addax Petroleum has a dominantly onshore and offshore brown producing-fields asset base located in Nigeria, Gabon, Cameroon and the Kurdistan Region of Iraq, as well as the UK North Sea's Continental Shelf.
