= Oguta =

Local Government Area in Imo State, Nigeria

Oguta Ugwuta
- Town and LGA
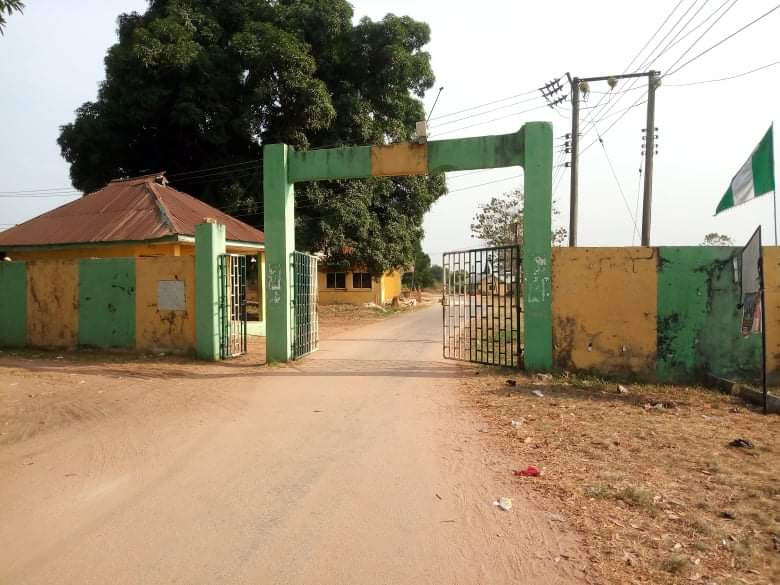
- Entrance to the building of Oguta Local Government Area
- Interactive map of Oguta
- Location within Nigeria
- Coordinates: 5°42′42″N 6°48′34″E
- Country: Nigeria
- State: Imo State

Government
  - Local Government Chairman: Ifeanyi Nani

Area
  - Total: 2,025.75 km^{2} (782.15 sq mi)

Population (2012)
  - Total: 20,096
  - Density: 9.9203/km^{2} (25.693/sq mi)
- Time zone: UTC+1 (WAT)
- Postcode: 464
- Goddess: Uhamiri
- National language: Igbo

Oguta is a town and Local government area in Imo State. The town is located on the eastern bank of Oguta Lake in southeastern Nigeria.

Oguta is called "Oguta-Ameshi" or "Ameshi"- by its aborigines. Indigenes - consists of two parts, the old part which holds the 27 villages of Oguta, and the new part, called the "Oguta New Layout".

Oguta New Layout, as a rule, is strict compliance with its original master plan. Oguta Town by location is embedded between Oguta Lake on the eastern side, and Obana River that joined Okposha River, on the western side, leaving only the Egwe Gateway as the only dry land route into Oguta without passing through water or a bridge.

Oguta as a tourist destination, makes most people including natives to have the preponderance to describe Oguta Town more often - as being located on the east bank of Oguta Lake. Oguta's high-yield oil and gas fields make Oguta an important territory and geographic area, hosting many multinational oil companies like AGIP, Shell, Chevron. Some times Oguta is used as a synonym for Oguta Local Government Area, which has Oguta as its headquarters. Oguta LGA is one of the twenty seven local government areas that make up the Imo State.

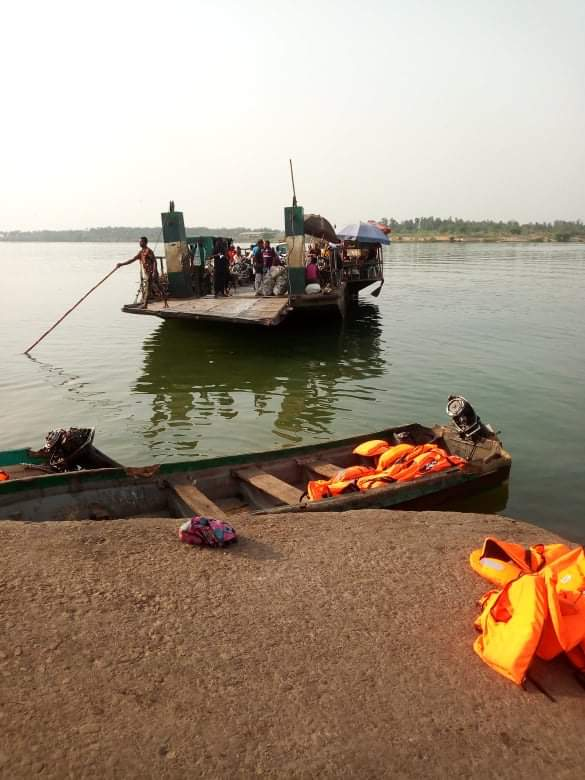
A view of travellers on Oguta Lake

In turn, Imo State is one of the five states that make up the South-East geopolitical region, which is one of the six geopolitical regions that make up The Federal Republic of Nigeria. With its Oguide Lake and Urashi River bestowing her peculiar advantages, Oguta was one of the chosen endowed territories that the British through the instrumentality of the Royal Niger Company, UAC, and then the British Colonial Government used and exploited diversely.

Due to its strategic waterways, oil and gas, palm produce, agricultural products, natural resources, Oguta was one of the oldest trade and administrative Centres in Nigeria. Connected to River Niger, Oguta waterways were used by the British and later Nigerian government forces during the Nigeria - Biafra civil war as routes through which to access and connect to the adjoining towns, villages and other settlement types nearer and further from Oguta, that were and remain principally peopled by other ethnic Igbo people the Mgbidi, Orlu, Awo-Omamma, Nkwerre, Owerri, Okigwe, Umuahia, Aba/Ngwa people, among others, who are substantial parts of the Eastern Nigerian population in the hinterland, collectively called "The Igbos".

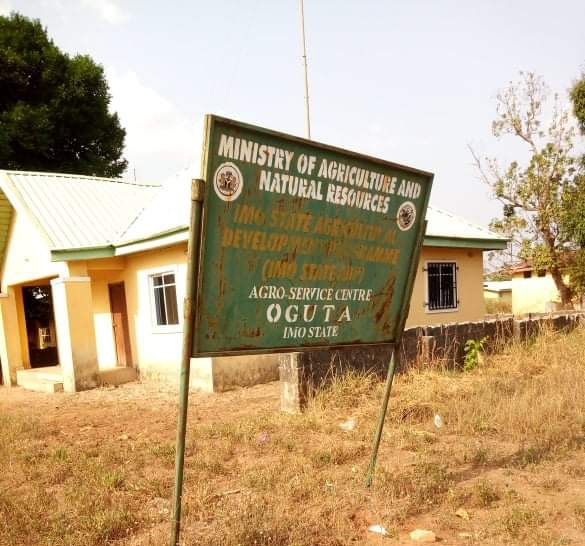
The signage of Ministry of Agriculture and Natural Resources, Oguta Local Government Area

As of 2012, Oguta's population was estimated at 20,096.

== Festivals ==
- Omerife (Ogene): Is the annual New Yam Festival celebrated during harvest time in Oguta. It holds from the last week of August to the third week of September.

== Location and territory ==
Oguta is located in Imo State of Nigeria, and shares boundaries with Anambra State, Delta State and Rivers State. It lies within the Lower Niger drainage basin. Oguta is the headquarters of the Oguta local government area and is one of the four crude oil producing local governments in Imo State.

== Territory ==
Oguta is a socio-geographic community town with a surface area of approximately 2,025.75 square kilometers. Oguta LGA itself comprises 27 villages. The Omereife festival (new yam ) – performed between July, August – September by, Mgbele, Nkwesi, Nneukwu, Osu Obodo Eziorsu, Oguta Egbuoma and Egwe communities. Okorosha festival (new year festival) – performed in August and September by, Agwa, Awa, Awo-Omamma, Izombe, Akabo and Ejemekuru lake.

== Climate ==
Climate data for Oguta
Month	Jan	Feb	Mar	Apr	May	Jun	Jul	Aug	Sep	Oct	Nov	Dec	Year
Mean daily maximum °C (°F)	32.5 (90.5)	34 (93)	33.4 (92.1)	32.5 (90.5)	31 (88)	29.8 (85.6)	28.6 (83.5)	28.5 (83.3)	29.1 (84.4)	30.1 (86.2)	31.6 (88.9)	32.0 (89.6)	31 (88)
Mean daily minimum °C (°F)	21 (70)	23 (73)	23.6 (74.5)	23.5 (74.3)	22.9 (73.2)	22.5 (72.5)	22.3 (72.1)	22.3 (72.1)	22.1 (71.8)	22 (72)	22.3 (72.1)	21.2 (70.2)	22.4 (72.3)
Average precipitation mm (inches)	18 (0.7)	41 (1.6)	110 (4.4)	170 (6.7)	240 (9.3)	270 (10.8)	340 (13.4)	270 (10.6)	360 (14)	260 (10.3)	69 (2.7)	15 (0.6)	2,160 (85.1)
Source: Weatherbase

== Notable people ==
- Tony Nsofor, an accomplished artist mostly known for his abstract paintings.
- Sylvanus Adiewere Nsofor, an accomplished jurist who also served as Nigeria’s ambassador to the USA from November 2017 to December 2020.
- Francis Arthur Nzeribe, a billionaire businessman and politician who was elected as a Senator for Orlu Senatorial constituency in Imo State from October 1983 to December 1983 and from May 1999 to May 2007, on the platform of the People's Democratic Party (PDP).
- Mike Mbama Okiro, the 13th indigenous Inspector-General of Police of the Federal Republic of Nigeria.
- Dr. Alban (Alban Uzoma Nwapa), a Nigerian-Swedish recording artist, producer and owner of record label Dr. Records.
- Chukwudifu Oputa, a Nigerian Supreme Court Justice (1984–1989). Headed Oputa Panel of 1999.
- Mary Nzimiro, Nigerian business woman, politician, and women's activist.
- Priscilla Nzimiro, first woman Medical doctor from Igboland.
- Charly Boy, a Nigerian singer/songwriter, television presenter, publisher, and producer. Popularly known as Area Fada.
