= Godson Chinyere Echefu =

Anglican bishop in Nigeria (1934–2020)

Godson Chinyere Echefu was the Anglican Bishop of Ideato in Owerri Province of the Church of Nigeria from 1999 until his retirement in 2004.

Echefu was born in Nkwerre on 25 March 1934. He attended Okongwu Memorial Grammar School, Nnewi, followed by St. Paul's College, Awka until 1958. He was at Trinity Union Theological College, Umuahia from 1962 until 1964, and ordained priest in 1965. Assisted by the second Bishop of Owerri, Benjamin C. I Nwankiti, Echefu went to Crowther Hall, Birmingham, England in 1983 to undertake an advanced course in Theology.

He was consecrated the first Bishop of Ideato at Christ Church, Uwari, Enugu, on 11 July 1999 by Abiodun Adetiloye, Primate of the Church of Nigeria.

He retired as bishop in 2004, and was succeeded by Caleb Anny Maduoma. Echefu died in hospital in November 2020.
