= Umueshi =

Town in Imo, Nigeria

- Location of Umueshi in Nigeria
- Coordinates: 05°49′49″N 007°6′23″E
- Country: Nigeria
- State: Imo
- Local Government Area: Ideato South

Government
  - Governor: Hope Uzodinma (APC)

Umueshi is a community in Ideato South Local Government Area in Imo State, Nigeria. The community comprises 15 villages, including: Okorobi, Umuezeanuwai, Umunwangwu, Umuanajughi, Ukabi, Umuokwara, Umudieshi, Okoroikpa, Umuduruaku, Umudire, and Obinugwu.

== Environment ==
It is the home of Umueshi Gully Erosion intervention project by the World Bank.

== Culture ==
Umueshi is a Christian community. The two major denominations are Catholic and Anglican. The native inhabitants speak Igbo and English.

== Economy ==
The main occupations are agriculture and trade.

Natural resources include palm trees, white sand, bamboo trees etc.

== Culture ==
The Umueshi people maintain cordial relations with their neighbours: Ntueke, Amanator, Ogboko, Obiohia, Isiekenesi, Dikenafai, Umuobom, Ugbelle, Umuma-isiaku, Umuchima and Urualla.

== Geography ==
Other villages in Umueshi are Umuokwaraire, Umuawa, Umuokohia Umuokaranadike, Okabi, Umuelee, Agwa, and Umuegbu

Umuawa is a village in Umunagankpa clan of Umueshi autonomous community Ideato in Imo state.

Ideato South has faced erosion problems. An intervention programme has the support of the World Bank. Umueshi Gully Erosion intervention site includes Amanato and Ntueke as neighbouring (watershed contributor) communities.

== Economy ==
The major occupations are agriculture and trade.
