= Etekwuru =

Etekwuru is one of the villages located in the Ohaji/Egbema Local Government Area of Imo State, Nigeria. Etekwuru is a community located in the Niger Delta region of southern Nigeria.

Town: Egbema
LGA: Ohaji/Egbema
State:	Imo State
Country:	Nigeria
Time zone Postal codes:	UTC+1 (WAT) 464113

Etekwuru, being an oil producing community, has contributed to several ongoing Oil and Gas Exploration in Nigeria, being host community to Adapalm Nigeria Limited and has contributed to the growth of The Niger Delta Development Commission (NDDC) and The Imo State Oil Producing Areas Commission (ISOPADEC).
