= Noel Agwuocha Chukwukadibia =

Nigerian lawyer

Right Honourable Noel Agwuocha Chukwukadibia
- Born: 25 December 1959 (age 66); Ahiazu-Mbaise, Imo State, Nigeria
- Education: Imo State University
- Occupations: Lawyer; Activist; Author; Farmer; Politician
- Notable work: War Without End in Nigeria
- Spouse: Ijeoma Chukwukadibia (m. 1989)

Rt Hon. Chief Barr. Sir Noel Agwuocha Chukwukadibia // (Nobus-Nobus, Emetumba Mbaise) is a Nigerian lawyer, politician and author from Imo State. Noel was a member of the Imo State House of Assembly representing Ahiazu-Mbaise State Constituency, becoming the first Speaker of the 1st Imo Assembly. Immediately after his single tenure in the house of assembly, he was appointed to the position of Commissioner of Public Utilities and Rural Development by Achike Udenwa and again reappointed as Commissioner for Commerce and Industry in Imo State.

== Background ==
Noel Agwuocha Chukwukadibia was born on 25 December 1959 in Imo State to Venerable Eleazar Ononiwu Agwuocha - an Archdeacon Emeritus of the Anglican Communion and Mrs. Eunice Ugonma Agwuocha.

He attended St. Michael's Primary School, Port-Harcourt and Central School Eziama, Ahiazu-Mbaise. Attended grade school at St. Augustine's Grammar School, Nkwerre where he made a Grade 1 in the Government Certificate Examination (G.C.E) and a distinction in the First School Leaving Certificate (F.S.L.C).

He holds an L.LB (Hons) Degree from the Imo State University, Masters of International Law and Diplomacy (M.I.L.D) degree 1992 from the University of Lagos. Noel Agwuocha Chukwukadibia holds a Ph.D (Honoris Causa) in Public Administration.

He also studied English and has Nigeria Certificate of Education in addition.

Noel Agwuocha Chukwukadibia is President/Founder, Cleanbills Industries, a parent company of Nobus Integrated Farms and a host of other enterprises. He is married to Lady Ijeoma Stella Chukwukadibia and together they have 6 children (3 girls and 3 boys).

== Early life and career ==
Noel Agwuocha Chukwukadibia has occupied various positions in his early life from primary school to university.

1. He was school prefect for Primary and Secondary School levels.
2. Hall Chairman, El-Kineme Hall of Residence, University of Lagos.
3. Secretary English Students Association.
4. Social Secretary Education Students Association.
5. Member of Parliament, Students Representative Council, University of Lagos Students Union.
6. President, Nigerian Youth Forum
7. House of Representatives Candidate for Social Democratic Party (SDP) and later United Nigeria Congress Party (UNCP).
8. Governorship Aspirant under United Nigeria Congress Party (UNCP)

Noel Agwuocha Chukwukadibia also briefly worked for the State Security Service (SSS) and Imo Broadcasting Corporation (IBC).

== Political career ==
Chukwukadibia was a Speaker of the Imo State House of Assembly 1st Assembly and a two-time commissioner of the Imo State Government under Governor Achike Udenwa.

He was appointed in 2007 as director-general of the Achike Udenwa presidential campaign organization. Achike Udenwa was unable to secure the presidential nomination, losing the ticket to Umaru Musa Yar'Adua.

Noel contested the Peoples Democratic Party national chairmanship seat in 2008. A coalition of youths and women of the Peoples Democratic Party North-West Zone endorsed his candidature.

Making their position known in a release after a meeting attended by 103 delegates from the seven northern states in Kaduna, the chairman, Abdulkadir Kamshi, and General Secretary, Hon. Abdulkadir Mustapha, said they have found in Chukwukadibia a worthy and competent candidate who has what it takes to take the P.D.P to even greater heights.

He lost the seat to Vincent Eze Ogbulafor.

In 2011, He was selected to be the running mate for former Senator Ifeanyi Ararume under the Action Congress of Nigeria.

== Post politics ==
Chukwukadibia is the principal partner of Onazaekpere Chambers, Imo State, Nigeria.

He is a Knight of St. Christopher (KSC) in the Anglican Diocese of Mbaise and currently serves as the Vice Chancellor and Registrar of the Ohaji-Egbema Anglican Diocese.

Chukwukadibia is famed for taking the Federal government of Nigeria to the ECOWAS Court for negligence for failure to remove remnants of landmines and explosives from the Nigerian Civil War A consent judgment was issued when the two parties agree to a settlement to end a lawsuit; the parties wrote up an agreement for the judge to sign. The Federal Government agreed to pay Eighty-eight Billion Naira as compensation to victims of the Civil War in some affected states in the country.

== Literary works ==
Noel Agwuocha Chukwukadibia has authored several books Including;

- The Return of Hope,
- War Without End in Nigeria,
- Marathon Kiss,
- Mama Put,
- Chukwuemeka Odumegwu Ojukwu—Peoples' Verdict,
- Chinua Achebe Between Two Worlds and,
- Dr. Abubakar Olusola Saraki ( Waziri of Ilorin) in History
