= Dikenafai =

Town in Imo, Nigeria

- Location of Dikenafai in Nigeria
- Coordinates: 5°46′0″N 7°9′17″E
- Country: Nigeria
- State: Imo
- Local Government Area: Ideato South

Government
  - Governor: Hope Uzodinma (APC)

Dikenafai is a town in Ideato South Local Government Area of Imo State, Nigeria, famous for its natural waterfall, Ezeama, which turns into the great Orashi River. Dikenafai currently serves as the headquarters of Ideato South.

== Location and Boundaries ==
Dikenafai shares boundaries with Okwelle, Abba, Umudi, Isiekenesi and Okwe communities of Imo State.

== Urashi Waterfall ==
Orashi River takes off as a stream, from the rocks, at the base of the waterfall, 183 m above mean sea level, in the Urashi enclave of Ezeama community in Dikenafai. The river then flows through several communities in eastern Nigeria to the Atlantic.

The entrance to the waterfall was around the corner from Ezeama, the Water God's altar. "It was a narrow, unassuming pathway cut into the thicket of the forest. From the pathway, one could hear the steady rush of water growing louder as one drew near. A gentle mist hung in the air; a sweet combination of salty rainwater mixed with the smell of fresh wet earth. The pathway, which was less than a quarter of a mile long, soon gave way to a clear opening and there suddenly the waterfall appeared, a breathtaking view, like a huge strike of lightning on a bright summer day", described Nema Obih.

As a lifeline to Ideato South communities, Urashi stream serves as an all purpose river for drinking, washing and many other purposes to communities such as Umulewe, Umuchima and Ntueke.

== Infrastructure ==
By 2009, poor access roads was identified as one of the key constraints militating against optimal performance in informal economic activities amongst rural women of Isiekenesi, Dikenafai, Mgbidi, Awo-omamma, Nkwerre, Izombe, Amiri, Otulu and other communities in Orlu senatorial zone of Imo State. Other problems included poor development of electricity, portable water, and lack of credit facilities to small markets. Land tenure problems was also identified as one of the greatest factors that hindered development of large-scale farming.
