= Imo State University of Innovation, Science and Technology =

Public university in Omuma, Imo State, Nigeria

University of Innovation, Science and Technology, Omuma
- Type: Public university
- Established: 2025
- Vice-Chancellor: Aloysius Chijioke Onyeka
- Location: Omuma_town, Imo State, Nigeria
- Website: www.uisto.edu.ng

The University of Innovation, Science and Technology, Omuma (UISTO) is a public university in Omuma, Oru East, Imo State, Nigeria. The National Universities Commission (NUC) issued a recognition letter for the establishment of the institution on 20 October 2025. The university became the fourth state-owned university in Imo State.

== Establishment ==
The Imo State Government established the university to expand access to tertiary education and develop skills in science, technology, digital innovation and entrepreneurship. The NUC presented the recognition letter to Governor Hope Uzodimma in Abuja on 20 October 2025.

The NUC stated that the establishment would bring the number of universities in Nigeria to 301 at the time of recognition. It also said that the relevant national education agencies, including the Joint Admissions and Matriculation Board (JAMB), the National Youth Service Corps (NYSC) and the Nigerian Education Loan Fund (NELFUND), would be notified of the institution's recognition.

The establishment was also reported by The Guardian, which described the institution as Imo State's fourth university owned by the state government.

== Location ==
The university is located in Omuma, the headquarters of Oru East Local Government Area in Imo State, southeastern Nigeria.

== Academic focus ==
The university was established with an emphasis on science, technology, digital skills and entrepreneurship. At the recognition ceremony, Governor Hope Uzodimma said that the institution was intended to equip students with practical skills and encourage graduates to create businesses and employment opportunities.

The governor also stated that the university would work with Imo Digital City and the University of California, Berkeley, on the development of a practical curriculum. The details and implementation of this arrangement require confirmation from the institutions involved.

== Governance and leadership ==
Professor Aloysius Chijioke Onyeka was appointed the university's pioneer substantive vice-chancellor, effective 26 November 2025. His appointment was announced by Kingsley Ozumba Mbadiwe University, where he had previously served as deputy vice-chancellor.

The university is subject to regulation by the National Universities Commission. At the time of recognition, the NUC stated that it would conduct a resource-verification visit before the institution's full take-off, with attention to infrastructure, staffing and governance.

== Admissions ==
The university's official website advertises undergraduate programmes for the 2026–2027 academic session. Applicants should consult the university's website for current admission requirements, available programmes and application procedures.

== See also ==
- National Universities Commission
- Imo State University
- Kingsley Ozumba Mbadiwe University
- University of Agriculture and Environmental Sciences
