= Imo State =

State of Nigeria

Imo
- State
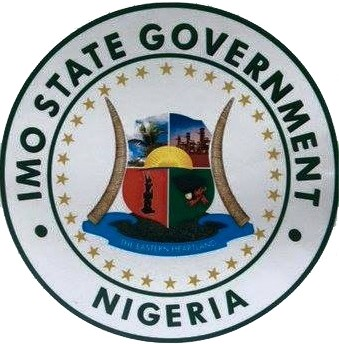
- Flag Seal
- Nicknames: Eastern Heartland; Igbo: Obi Ọwụwa Anyanwụ
- Location of Imo State in Nigeria
- Coordinates: 5°29′N 7°2′E
- Country: Nigeria
- LGAs: 27
- Created: 3 February 1976
- Capital: Owerri

Government
  - Governor: Hope Uzodinma (APC)
  - Deputy Governor: Lady Chinyere Ekomaru (APC)
  - Legislature: Imo State House of Assembly
  - Senators: E: Onyewuchi Francis Ezenwa (APC); N: Frank Ibezim (APC); W: Osita Izunaso (APC)
  - Representatives: List

Area
  - Total: 5,530 km^{2} (2,140 sq mi)
  - Rank: Ranked 34th

Population (2017 est.)^{1}
  - Total: 4,927,563
  - Estimate (2022): 5,459,300
  - Rank: 13th of 36
  - Density: 891/km^{2} (2,310/sq mi)
- Demonym(s): Ndi Imo, Ndi Imolite

GDP (PPP)
  - Year: 2021
  - Total: $49.69 billion 4th of 36
  - Per capita: $7,828; 3rd of 36
- Time zone: UTC+01 (WAT)
- postal code: 460001
- ISO 3166 code: NG-IM
- HDI (2022): 0.693 medium · 3rd of 37
- Language: Igbo; English

Imo (Igbo: Alaọha Imo) is a state in the South-East geopolitical zone of Nigeria, bordered to the north by Anambra State, Rivers State to the west and south, and Abia State to the east. It takes its name from the Imo River which flows along the state's eastern border. The state capital is Owerri and the State's slogan is the "Eastern Heartland."

Of the 36 States in Nigeria, Imo is the third smallest in area, but is the fourteenth most populous, with an estimated population of over 5.4 million as of 2022. Geographically, the state is divided between the Niger Delta swamp forests in the far east and the drier Cross–Niger transition forests in the rest of the state. Other key geographical features are the state's rivers and lakes with the Awbana, Imo, Orashi, and Otamiri rivers along with the Oguta Lake in western Imo State.

The Imo state economy is highly dependent on agricultural production, especially the production of palm oil, which a majority of citizens rely on for cooking. A key minor industry is the extraction of crude oil and natural gas, especially in Imo's north and west.

Imo State currently has the third highest Human Development Index out of all states in Nigeria, and consistently ranks as a top performing state in literacy and educational attainment.

== History ==
The area encompassing modern-day Imo State has been inhabited for thousands of years by southern Igbo people. The Igbo language serves as a lingua franca throughout the state, alongside English which was adopted during British colonization. At the start of the 20th century, the British incorporated the area into the Southern Nigeria Protectorate, which later merged into British Nigeria in 1914. After the merger, the area became a centre of anti-colonial resistance during the Women's War.

After Nigeria secured independence from Britain in 1960, the Imo area was part of Eastern Region until splitting to become part of East Central State in 1967. Political instability in Nigeria had worsened significantly by this time and culminated when the former Eastern Region attempted to secede in the three-year long Nigerian Civil War, with present-day Imo forming part of the secessionist Igbo nationalist state Biafra.

The Imo area was hard-fought over throughout the war, with Owerri and its surrounding areas ending up one of the last Biafra-controlled strongholds by the time Owerri took over from Umuahia as the designated Biafran capital in late 1969. The Imo area was eventually captured for good early 1970 in Operation Tail-Wind, during which Nigerian federal forces took the Biafran capital in a final battle that ended the war by prompting negotiations.

Following the end of the civil war and reunification of Nigeria, East Central State was reinstated until an Imo State was officially formed in 1976 during the Murtala Muhammed regime. Fifteen years later, in 1991, the current iteration of Imo State was created when eastern Imo state was sectioned off to form the new Abia State, with the same section being split up further in 1996 to merge with a section of Enugu State to form present-day Ebonyi State.

Meetings for Imo State creation took place in Ngwoma and began shortly after the war ended in 1970, chaired by Eze S. E. Onukogu. The state is named after the Imo River, which flows through Imo State and multiple other southeastern Nigerian states before emptying into the Atlantic Ocean.

People from the Imo State area have a long history of resisting threats to their peace and way of life. There were multiple agitations against British colonial policies, such as during the Women's War, and the area served as a centre of Biafra resistance until the very end of the Nigerian Civil War. There have also been more recent statewide protests, such as the anti-cult Otokoto riots of 1996 in response to serial kidnappings and murders occurring in Imo at the time, and the more recent #EndSARS protests in 2020, as well as the participation of some young indigenes in regional militias operating throughout Southeastern Nigeria. However, despite intermittent unrest, Imo State has fast growing population and industrialization and an excellent Human Development Index ranking among Nigerian states.

== Geography ==
Imo State is bordered by Anambra State to the north for 84 km (52 mi), Abia State to the east for about 104 km (partly in the vicinity of the Imo River), and Rivers State to the south and west for about 122 km. The state lies within latitudes 4°45'N and 7°15'N, and longitude 6°50'E and 7°25'E, with an area of around 5,100 sq km.

== Economy ==
=== Natural resources ===
The state has several natural resources which includes, crude oil, natural gas, lead, calcium carbonate, solar and wind power, zinc. salt and sharp sand used in construction is highly abundant.

Profitable flora including iroko, mahogany, obeche, bamboo, rubber tree and oil palm. Additionally white clay, fine sand and limestone are also found in the state.

=== Oil and gas exploration ===
There are over 163 oil wells, at over 12 different locations in the State. The main petroleum companies operating in the State are Addax Petroleum, Chevron Corporation, Royal Dutch Shell and Agip. Some of the established oil-rich local government councils include: Ohaji/Egbema, Oguta, Oru East, Iho, Oru West, Obowo and Ngor Okpala. In recent times, indigenes of Ohaji/Egbema communities have been protesting about poor basic amenities in their host community despite the presence of oil producing companies.

=== Agriculture ===
Agriculture is the primary occupation, but due to over-farming and high population density, the soil has greatly degraded. This could be a result of inefficient production techniques, poor resource base, declining soil productivity, predominance of primitive techniques of agricultural production, inadequate supply of credit, low capital investment, use of crude implements to mention but a few. As a result, the agricultural sector in Imo State would benefit greatly from improved state government and private sector interventions, because an undiversified economy based on crude oil, natural gas and palm oil is unlikely to promote robust and sustainable development of the state.

=== Tourism ===
Oguta Lake, Palm Beach Holiday Resort in Awo-omamma, and a host of other tourist sites along the banks of the 26 km-length Njaba River present hotspots for tourism.

=== Investment opportunities ===
Many investment opportunities exist in the State including oil and gas exploration, residential and commercial real estate such as brewery plants, chemical plants, hydroelectric plants, gas-fired power plants, and grain mills; starch production, cashews, fruit and vegetable juice concentrate production, integrated multi-oil seed processing plants, ceramics, inland waterway transport, and palm produce industry.

Independent global brewer Heineken, through its subsidiary Nigerian Breweries, has significant investment in Imo State. The company manages the world-class Awo-omamma Brewery, a multiple-line plant.

Many oil and gas opportunities are yet to be developed. The federal government has been called to inspect newly discovered oil-rich areas, which might help foster economic development and job creation.

Industrial parks and processing zones to harness the huge agricultural produce and minerals would give a major boost to the state's economic growth and industrialization.

== Climate ==
=== Weather ===
The rainy season begins in April and lasts until October, with annual rainfall varying from 1,500 to 2,200 mm (59 to 87 in).

An average annual temperature above 20 °C (68.0 °F), creates an annual relative humidity of 75%. With humidity reaching 90% in the rainy season. The dry season experiences two months of Harmattan, from late December to late February. The hottest months are between January and March.

With high population density and over farming, the soil has been degraded and much of the native vegetation has disappeared. This deforestation has triggered soil erosion, which is compounded by heavy seasonal rainfall that has led to the destruction of houses and roads.

=== Environmental issues ===
==== Soil erosion ====
Soil erosion is the most common geo-environmental hazard in Imo State, with over 360 erosion sites, out of which 57 are confirmed to be critical and in need of immediate remediation. They are mostly gully erosion found in Ideato, Orlu, Ihitte-uboma, Arondizuogu, Umuomi-ikeduru and Njaba areas of the state. These gullies are attributed mainly to poor civil engineering works, specifically road/gutter construction as well as sand mining. During road construction, adequate control of the runoff generated in this process is poorly taken into consideration. There is also no proper termination, spill way, and gabions to lower intense flow to non-erosion velocities during gutter construction. Hence, rainwater overflow from concrete gutters resulting in erosion, especially at the intersection of gutter and road.

Due to gullies, farmlands have been significantly affected, with both farmlands and their road paths lost. There is also loss of social infrastructures such as, electricity and pipe-borne waters. Communities such as Ikeduru, Orlu, Ehime Mbano, Nwangele, Nkwerre and Mbaitoli dependent on stream and harvested rainwater for domestic use have been impacted due to surface water/stream pollution caused by intense runoffs from the gully sites.

Nigeria Erosion and Watershed Management Project (NEWMAP), kick-started in the state on 11 November 2014, and the ecological fund are some of the interventions for soil erosion in the State. Communities such as Eziala- Obizi in Ezinihitte Mbaise LGA; Iyiuzo-Ihioma-Ogberuru in Orlu LGA; Umueshi-Amanato in Ideato South LGA; Umuturu -Ezemazu -Urualla in Ideato North LGA; Umunumo Ibeafor in Ehime Mbano LGA; and Umueze Obazu-Mbieri in Mbaitoli LGA are beneficiaries of the NEWMAP project in Imo State.

==== Flooding ====
Available research identifies Oguta, Ohaji/Egbema, Ngor Okpala, Owerri West, Owerri North, Aboh Mbaise and Owerri municipal LGAs as very high flood areas; Mbaitolu, Ikeduru, Aboh Mbaise, Onuimo, IhiteUboma, Obowo and Ehime Mbano LGAs as moderate flood hazard areas; and northern of Isiala Mbano, Nwangele, Nkwere, Orlu, Ehime Mbano and Southern part of Ideato North, Okigwe and Ideato South LGAs as low flood hazard areas.

In August 2019, flooding caused by heavy rain submerged about 70 houses, displaced 2000 villagers and destroyed farmlands in Orsu-Obodo community, in the Oguta local government area. Many residents in the state capital (Owerri) were also displaced in 2017. The Orlu-Umuchima-Obiohia-Akokwa-Uga federal road has been cut off by gully erosion thereby leaving motorists and other road users stranded.

Ideato North and Ideato South have been erosion high risk areas in recent times in Imo State. Isiala Mbano is also not left out in these frequent flood disaster in Imo State.

== Government ==
=== Administration ===
The capital city of Imo State is Owerri. Imo State has a three-tier administrative structure: State, Local, and Autonomous Community levels. The three arms at state level are the Executive, the Legislative and the Judiciary. The executive arm is headed by a democratically elected Governor, who works closely with members of the Imo State House of Assembly and is assisted by a Deputy Governor, Commissioners, and Executive Advisers.

This is a list of Administrators and Governors of Imo State since its creation:

Name	Title	Took office	Left office	Party
Ndubuisi Kanu	Governor	Mar 1976	1977	(Military)
Adekunle Lawal	Governor	1977	Jul 1978	(Military)
Sunday Ajibade Adenihun	Governor	Jul 1978	Oct 1979	(Military)
Samuel Onunaka Mbakwe	Governor	1 Oct 1979	31 Dec 1983	NPP
Ike Nwachukwu	Governor	Jan 1984	Aug 1985	(Military)
Allison Amakoduna Madueke	Governor	Aug 1985	1986	(Military)
Amadi Ikechegh	Governor	1986	1990	(Military)
Anthony E. Oguguo	Governor	Aug 1990	Jan 1992	(Military)
Evan Enwerem	Governor	Jan 1992	Nov 1993	NRC
James N.J. Aneke	Administrator	9 Dec 1993	22 Aug 1996	(Military)
Tanko Zubairu	Administrator	22 Aug 1996	May 1999	(Military)
Achike Udenwa	Governor	29 May 1999	29 May 2007	PDP
Ikedi G. Ohakim	Governor	29 May 2007	29 May 2011	PPA / PDP
Owelle Rochas Anayo Okorocha	Governor	29 May 2011	29 May 2019	APGA/APC
Emeka Ihedioha	Governor	29 May 2019	15 Jan 2020	PDP
Hope Uzodinma	Governor	15 Jan 2020	Till date	APC

The legislative arm is headed by the Speaker of the State House of Assembly. As of the 10th Imo State House Assembly (2023), the current Speaker of the House is Rt. Hon. Chike Olemgbe. He is a first-time member representing Ihitte/Uboma Local Government Area. Also, the Deputy Speaker of the house is Hon. Amara Iwuanyanwu, who is a member representing the Nwangele constituency. The remainder of the House Assembly is made up of elected legislators from the 27 LGAs of Imo State.

The Imo State Judiciary is made up of a High Court and Customary Court of Appeal of the State, and headed by the Chief Justice of the State.

=== Politics ===
The electoral system of each state in Nigeria uses a modified two-round system. To be elected in the first round, a candidate must receive the plurality of the vote and over 25% of the vote in at least two-thirds of the State Local Government Areas. If no candidate passes this threshold, a second round will be held between the top candidate and the next candidate to have received a plurality of votes in the highest number of Local Government Areas.

=== Local Government Areas ===
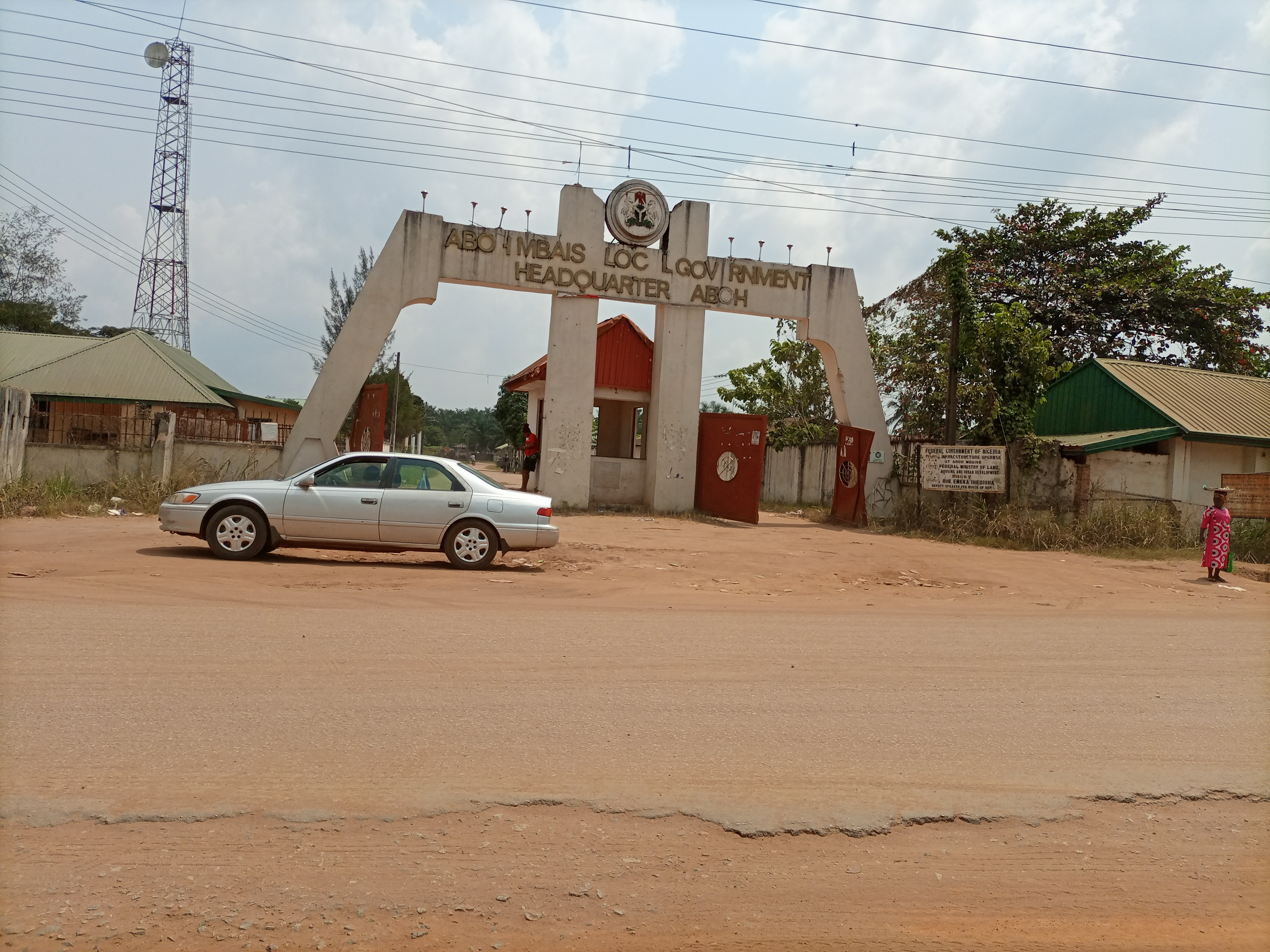
Aboh Mbaise Local Government Area in Imo State

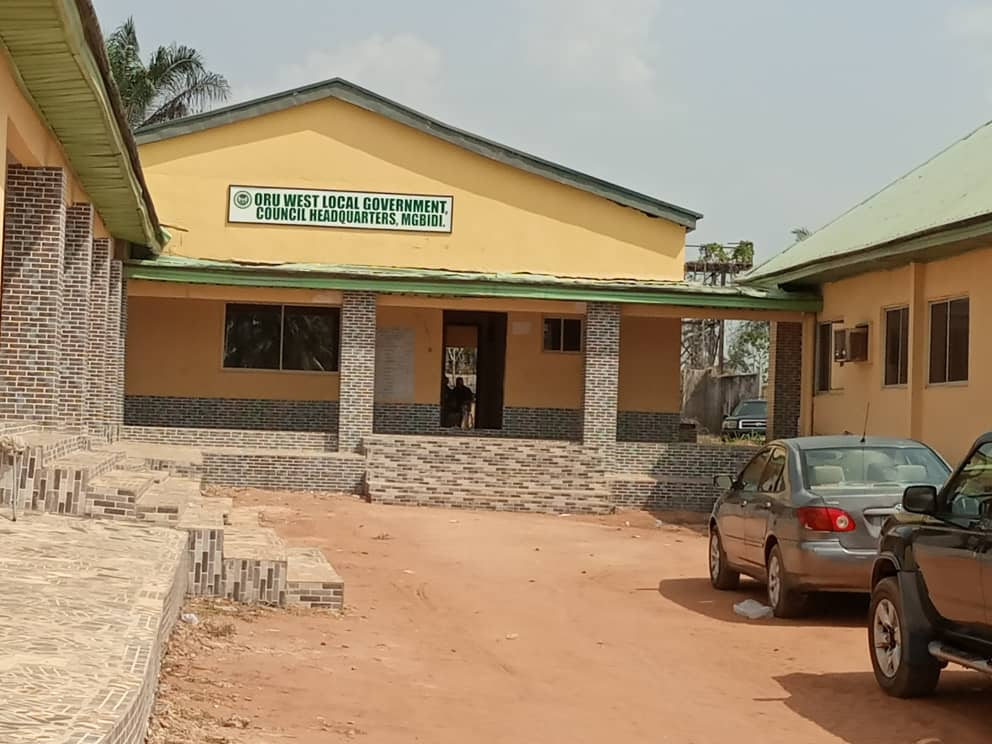
Oru West L.G.A. Imo State

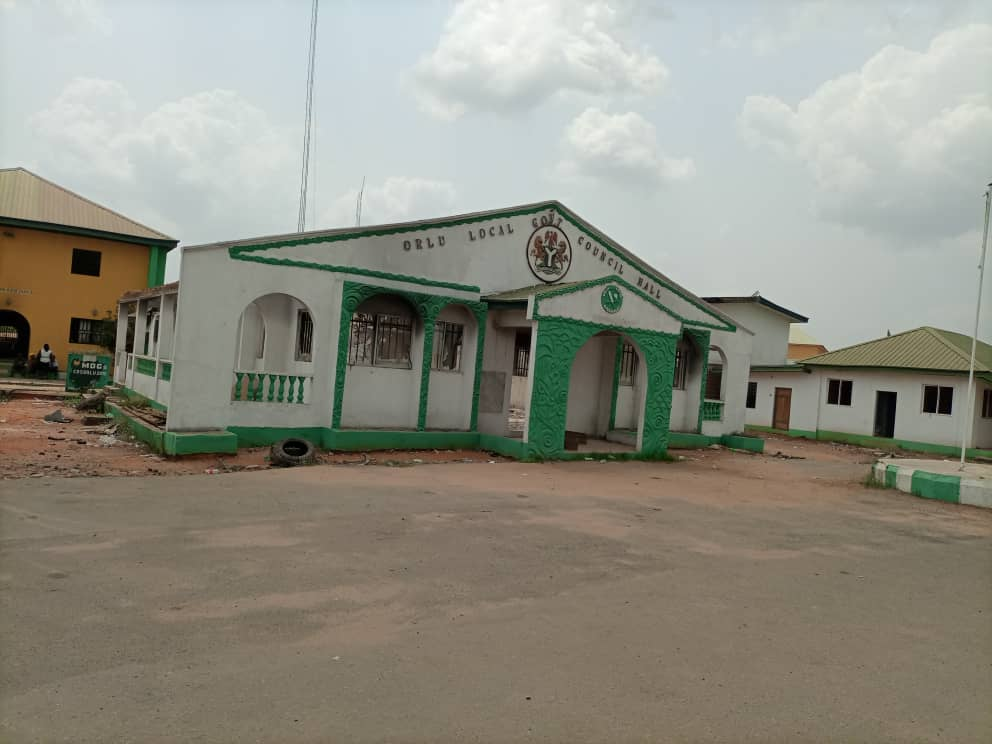
Orlu Local Government Area, Imo State

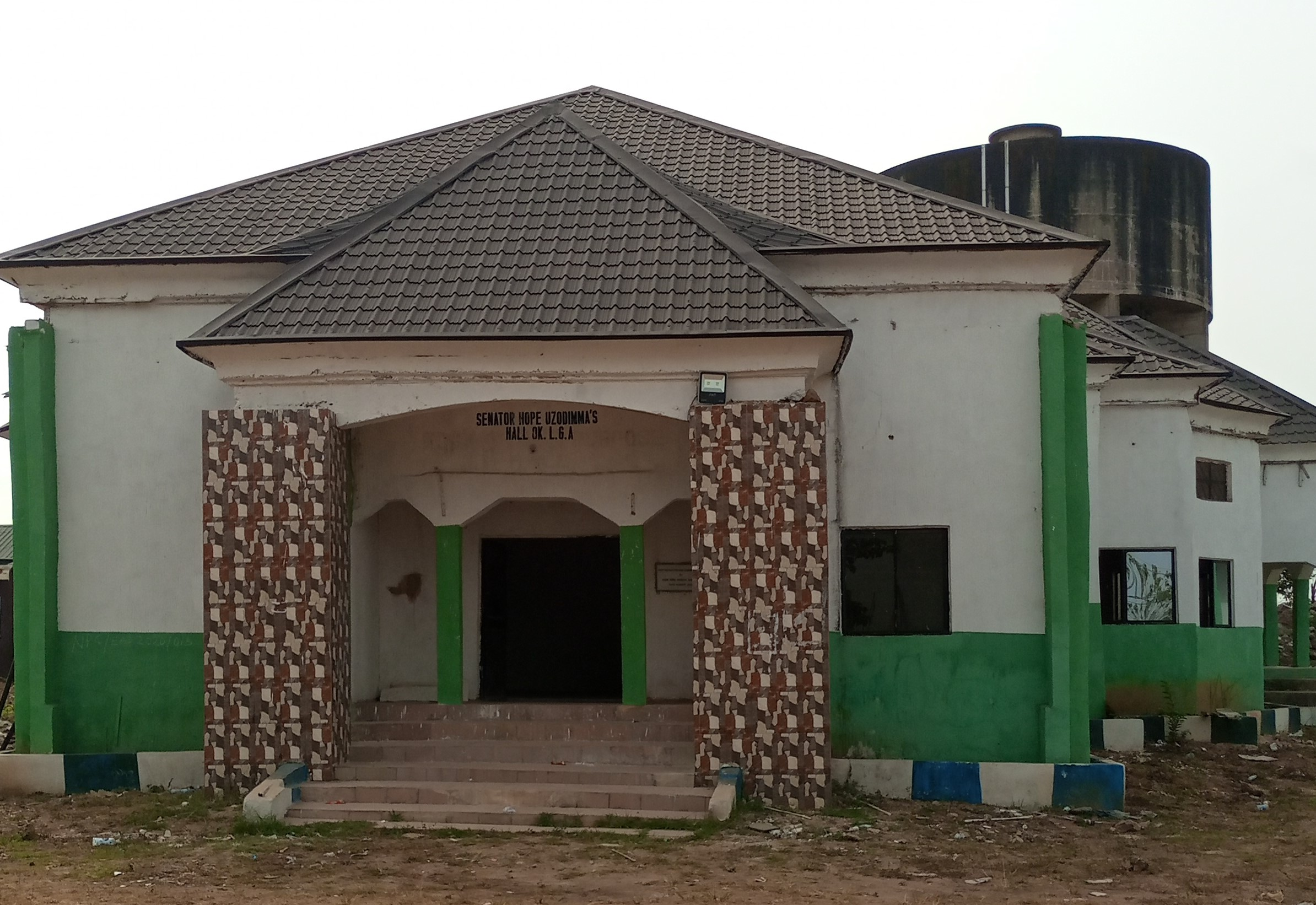
Okigwe Local Government Area, Imo State

Imo State consists of 27 local government areas:

- Aboh Mbaise
- Ahiazu Mbaise
- Ehime Mbano
- Ezinihitte Mbaise
- Ideato North
- Ideato South
- Ihitte/Uboma
- Ikeduru
- Isiala Mbano
- Isu
- Mbaitoli
- Ngor Okpala
- Njaba
- Nkwerre
- Nwangele
- Obowo
- Oguta
- Ohaji/Egbema
- Okigwe
- Onuimo
- Orlu
- Orsu
- Oru East
- Oru West
- Owerri Municipal
- Owerri North
- Owerri West

Smaller jurisdictions in the state may receive township status or urban status.

== Demographics ==
The state has over 5.5 million people, and the population density varies from 230 to 1,400 people per square kilometre. Christianity and Odinani are the majority religions, with Odinani becoming more common as citizens are beginning to embrace their religious heritage. In addition to its capital, other notable towns are Orlu, Obowo, Oguta, Awo-Omamma, Mgbidi, Mbaise, Okigwe and Ohaji/Egbema.

=== Language ===
Imo State is a predominantly Igbo-speaking state, with Igbo people constituting a majority of the population (around 98%).

=== Religion ===
Majority of Imo State residents are Christians. There is also a Central Mosque in Orlu city, with a few minorities and settlers as members. Catholics (2021) in the Archdiocese of Owerri (1948) with 162 parishes under Archbishop Lucius Iwejuru Ugorji (2022), and two suffragan dioceses of Okigwe (1981) with 119 parishes under Bishop Solomon Amanchukwu Amatu (2006) and Orlu (1980) with 189 parishes under Bishop Augustine Tochukwu Ukwuoma (2008). The Anglican Church of Nigeria includes the Province of Owerri led by Archbishop David Onuoha (2020), also Bishop of Okigwe South, and 10 other Dioceses of Okigwe South (1994) led by Bishop David Onuoha (2004), Owerri led by Bishop Chukwuma Oparah (2018), Orlu led by Bishop Benjamin Chinedum Okeke (2019), Mbaise(1992) led by Bishop Chamberlain Chinedu Ogunedo (2010), Isi Mbano led by Bishop Godson Udochukwu Ukanwa, Ideato(1999) led by Bishop Henry Okeke (2020), Ohaji/Egbema led by Bishop Childi Collins Oparaojiaku (2008), On the Lake led by Bishop Chijioke Oti (2008), Oru led by Bishop Geoffrey Chukwunenye (2008), Okigwe led by Bishop Edward Osuegbu, and Ikeduru led by Bishop Emmanuel Maduwike (2009).

== Education ==
=== Institutions of higher learning ===
This is a list of the higher institutions located in Imo State:

- Federal Polytechnic, Nekede
- Federal University of Technology Owerri
- Hezekiah University, Umudi
- Imo State Polytechnic, Now university of Agriculture Umuagwo
- Imo State University, Owerri
- Kingsley Ozumba Mbadiwe University, Ogboko, Ideato

== Transport ==
=== Federal Highways ===
- A3 north from Umuahia (Abia State) via Umuokwara to Lokpauku, Abia State.
- A6 northwest from Abia State at Umuika via Owerri to Anambra State.
- F106 east from Owerri via Nguru to A3 at Etiti.

=== Other major roads include ===
- the Uli-Aguta Rd north to Uli in Anambra State
- the Ihiala-Orlu Rd to Anambra State,
- the Nnewi-Okigwe Rd via Akokwa and Akwa-Okigwe Rd north to Anambra State,
- Okigwe-Afikpo Rd east to Abia State at Okigwe,
- the Umu-Opara Rd from Umoke to Abia State,
- the Umu-Ohie-Uku-Amala-Ibodo Rd southwest from Okpuala via Eziama and Amala to Olakwo in Rivers State,
- the Owerri-Ahoada Rd southwest to Rivers State,
- the Okwuzi-Aguta Rd south to the Ogura-Omoku Rd in Rivers State.

=== Airports ===
Sam Mbakwe International Cargo Airport.

== Notable people ==
=== Sport ===
- Chioma Ajunwa – 1996 Olympic gold long jumper
- Chidobe Awuzie - cornerback for the Baltimore Ravens
- Kelechi Iheanacho – striker for Leicester City, U-17 World Cup winner and tournament's MVP (2013)
- Samuel Okwaraji (1964–1989) – national footballer
- Levi Onwuzurike- defensive tackle for Detroit Lions 2021–present
- Nwankwo Kanu (1976–2011) - professional footballer

=== Arts ===
- Catherine Obianuju Acholonu – author
- Blaqbonez - Nigerian rapper
- Charly Boy – hip hop singer and activist
- Chidinma - musician and actress
- Rita Dominic – Nigerian actress
- Kelechi Eke - Filmmaker and Founder of Village Arts & Film Festival (VILLAFFEST), Owerri
- Prince Eke - Nollywood actor
- Fave - Nigerian Singer-songwriter
- Osita Iheme - actor and author
- Illbliss - Nigerian rapper
- Ada Jesus – Nigerian actress and comedienne
- Jidenna - rapper and singer
- Kanayo O. Kanayo - actor and lawyer
- John Munonye – author
- Genevieve Nnaji – Nollywood actress
- Alban Uzoma Nwapa – Eurodance musician
- Onyeka Nwelue – author, scholar, actor, entrepreneur
- Darlington Okoye - Musician, songwriter, social media personality
- Onyeka Onwenu – singer, actress and politician
- Snazzy the Optimist - musician
- Victony - Nigerian musician
- Dr Sir Warrior – highlife musician

=== Politics ===
- Pats Acholonu – Supreme Court Justice
- Chris Anyanwu – journalist and senator
- Ifeanyi Ararume – former senator of Okigwe zone (1999–2007)
- Martin Agbaso - former senator of Owerri
- Kema Chikwe – former Minister of Aviation
- Sebastian Okechukwu Mezu – Nigerian writer, scholar, philanthropist, publisher, and politician
- Chile Eboe-Osuji - Judge, International Court of Criminal Justice, Hague
- Evan Enwerem – former governor and former President of the Senate
- Bede Eke - politician
- Emeka Ihedioha - former Governor and Chief whip Nigeria House of Representatives
- Maurice Iwu – former INEC chairman
- Emmanuel Iwuanyanwu – politician and businessman
- Prince Eze Madumere - former Deputy Governor
- K. O. Mbadiwe – former Minister of Commerce and Industry
- Sam Mbakwe – former Governor
- Henry Nwawuba - Politician and Entrepreneur
- Raymond Njoku – former Minister of Transportation
- Chukwuemeka Nwajiuba - former House of Representatives Member and current Minister of the Federal Republic of Nigeria
- Arthur Nzeribe – former Senator Orlu Zone, Member of the Senate of Nigeria in the 4th National Assembly (1999–2003)
- Walter Ofonagoro – former Minister of Information and Culture
- Ikedi Ohakim – former governor
- Chris Okewulonu – Chief of Staff
- Rochas Okorocha – former governor and a serving senator representing Imo West, under investigation as of May 2022
- Fabian Osuji – former Minister of Education
- Ugonna Ozurigbo – Deputy Speaker, Imo State House of Assembly (2015–), and Member
- Achike Udenwa – former Governor
- Hope Uzodimma - Governor of Imo state

=== Other ===
- Adiele Afigbo – historian
- Peter Akah - Former Vice Chancellor, Imo State University
- Victor Adibe Chikwe - Roman Catholic bishop
- Michael Echeruo – academic and writer in Igbo studies
- Evangelist Ebuka Obi - Evangelist
- Ada Ehi — Nigerian gospel musician
- Nelson Enwerem - Mr Nigeria winner (2018)
- Emmanuel Ibezim - professor of pharmaceutics.
- Nenny B – media personality
- Austin Nosike - Professor of Economics and Management and Vice-Chancellor of James Hope University, Lagos.
- Mary Nzimiro - pioneering medical doctor
- Priscilla Nzimiro - medical doctor
- Odumeje — Clergyman.
- Evelyn Okere – Nigerian businesswoman, publisher, fashion designer
- Jaja of Opobo - first king (amanyanabo) of Opobo.
- Everest Okpara - Entrepreneur and Philanthropist
