= 1996 Otokoto Riots =

Riots event occurring in Imo state in 1996

1996 Otokoto riots
- Date: September 24–25, 1996
- Location: Owerri, Imo state
- Caused by: Child murder linked to ritualism
- Methods: Rioting, arson, assault
- Result: Arrest and trial of Black Scorpion cult

Parties
Owerri citizens	Black Scorpions cult Nigerian Police Force; Imo state government

Casualties
- Death: None
- Injuries: Unknown
- Arrested: Multiple, including 10 policemen

The 1996 Otokoto Riots were a series of spontaneous protests and looting in Owerri, Imo State, Nigeria over two days in September. The immediate trigger for the civil unrest was the revelation of the kidnapping and brutal murder of 11-year-old schoolboy boy Anthony Ikechukwu Okoronkwo, but had deeper roots in the corruption and inequality prevalent at the time. The subsequent arrest of hotelier Vincent Duru and other members of the Black Scorpion gang led to a court trial lasting over a decade. Duru and other Black Scorpion members were eventually sentenced to death.

== Background ==
The underlying factor leading to a statewide series of riots was due to the disappearance and serial murders of multiple individuals in Imo state. Owerri had gained a reputation as a peaceful conservative city, with a population drawn mainly from the civil service and academia in contrast to nearby commerce and industry-oriented towns Aba and Onitsha. However, the early nineties saw a surge in affluent citizens displaying ostentatious wealth with lavish mansions, expensive automobiles, and extravagant parties. Most claimed to own successful businesses including Otokoto Hotel, but the actual source of their wealth remained mysterious. These nouveau riche citizens were also notorious for using their wealth and connections with government officials and traditional rulers to constitute a menace to the lives of Owerri residents and purchase highly-coveted chieftaincy titles. The arrival of these magnates, many of whom had streets and roads named after them, coincided with armed robbery, kidnappings, and ritual killings, but most of these crimes remained unsolved.

In 1995, children of prominent Owerri residents, including medical doctors Darlington Amamasi and Omaka Okoh, J.C. Adiele, and Chime Nzeribe, were kidnapped by ritualist gangs who warned their parents not to contact the police. Ransom was paid to secure their release, but most hostages were never returned to their families, believed to have been used for Satanic practices, ritual murders, and organ trade. Imo state's Commissioner of Police, David Abure, dismissed these cases, branding Nzeribe as a "rumour monger." Following the intervention of the Nigerian Police Inspector-General Ibrahim Coomassie, the syndicate responsible for the kidnappings was nabbed, but Abure's lack of concern remained a source of worry to Owerri residents who criticised the police for symbolising corruption, mismanagement, and abuse.

== Murder of Ikechukwu Okoronkwo ==
On September 19 1996, 11-year-old schoolboy and groundnut hawker Anthony Ikechukwu Okoronkwo was drugged and killed by money ritualists inside Owerri’s highbrow Otokoto Hotel. Okoronkwo was lured into the hotel by Innocent Ekeanyanwu, a hotel gardener with ties to the Black Scorpions posing as a customer, who offered Okoronkwo a drugged cold beverage. After falling unconscious, Okoronkwo was carried into a hotel room where he was decapitated. His liver was removed and his penis severed, and his dismembered body was buried within the hotel premises.

Ekeanyanwu left the hotel for Eziama after cleaning the room to deliver the victim’s head to fellow Black Scorpion Leonard Unaogu, brother of former Sani Abacha aide Laz Unaogu. Unable to deliver the head in Unaogu’s absence due to being in Lagos on business at the time, Ekeanyanwu left the residence but drew suspicion from Hilary Opara, a commercial motorcyclist, who noticed blood dripping from Ekeanyanwu's carrier bag. Opara informed the police, and Ekeanyanwu was immediately arrested. The following day, a photograph of Ekeanyanwu holding Okoronkwo’s head was broadcast on television with the police asking the public to help identify the victim.

Ekeanyanwu was willing to cooperate with the police and give an official statement, but was found mysteriously unresponsive in his cell and pronounced dead before any trial could commence. An autopsy revealed he was poisoned. Three law enforcement officers were sentenced to death by Owerri High Court in 2002 for their role in the murder of Ekeanyanwu.

== Indictments and convictions ==
After Ekeanyanwu's arrest, Vincent Duru, Leonard Unaogu, and seven other suspects were arrested as they were all indicted by a brief confession made by Ekeanyanwu pertaining the murder of Okoronkwo prior his death in police custody. Ekeanyanwu named Unoagu as being the master mind behind this murder and several other murders. Unaogu and Duru denied knowing each other but their claim was insufficient, so a trial commenced on December 9, 1996, and the death penalty verdict was made in 2003, six years after the murder of Okoronkwo, their execution was carried out in November 2016, 20 years after their arrest and 13 years after the death penalty verdict was issued. Two suspects; Alban Ajaegbu and Ebenezer Egwueke were cleared as having no involvement in the murder of Okoronkwo. Leonard Unaogu died in prison under strange circumstances.

Duru's son Obicheozor, another member of Black Scorpion, was arrested, charged, and sentenced to death by firing squad. Ebenezer Egwueke, one of the two suspects who were acquitted as evidence did not show any foul play on his part, nor did he possess knowledge of the plot was acquitted in 2013; he was 62 years old at the time of his release.

== Riots ==
Image from the Otokoto riots of 1996 demolishing establishments owned by Vincent Duru.

The death of Okoronkwo enraged the Owerri citizens who blamed the police and government officials for refusing to tackle cases of ritual murder, kidnapping, and robbery while in office, reserving most of their fury for the Black Scorpion culprits. These events led to a riot that initiated the process of burning, demolishing, vandalising and utter destruction of all homes, businesses, and property owned by prominent Black Scorpion members including Otokoto Hotel, commercial centre Piano Plaza, Chibet Hotel, and mansions and cars belonging to other ritualists. Traditional ruler Eze Onu Egwu Nwoke's palace and cars were also destroyed. Following the demolition of the Otokoto hotel, buried corpses of unidentifiable people were discovered.

== Zubairu panel of inquiry ==
During the Otokoto Riots, the newly-appointed Imo state governor, Tanko Zubairu, established a panel of inquiry to determine the "immediate and remote causes" of the Otokoto riots, the panel deliberated for three weeks after which a verdict seizing the remainder of Vincent Duru's properties which had not been destroyed during the riots was reached.
