= Peace Anyiam-Osigwe =

Nigerian filmmaker (1969–2023)

- Born: 30 March 1969; Nkwerre, Imo, Nigeria
- Died: 9 January 2023 (aged 53); Lagos, Nigeria
- Education: Oxford Brookes University
- Occupations: Filmmaker, lawyer, philanthropist
- Years active: 1986–2023
- Website: www.anyiam-osigwe.com

Peace Anyiam-Osigwe MFR (previously Peace Anyiam-Fiberesima; 30 March 1969 – 9 January 2023) was a Nigerian filmmaker and entertainment executive who was called "the queen of Nollywood films". She was the founder of globally acclaimed film ceremony, Africa Movie Academy Awards. The Guardian documents that she pioneered the screening of Nollywood films at international film festivals. She directed the first music video of hip-hop sensation, P-Square. In 2012, she was bestowed a Member of the Order of the Federal Republic by the Nigerian government for her contribution to the entertainment industry. She was also a TED fellow.

== Early life ==
Anyiam-Osigwe was born on 30 March. She is from the notable Osigwe Anyiam-Osigwe family in Nkwerre, Imo State. She is the only girl in a family of eight children. She has a degree in Law and political science from Oxford Brookes University.

== Career ==
=== Africa Movie Academy Awards ===
Anyiam-Osigwe founded the Africa Film Academy, a body that governs the film ceremony since 2005. The award ceremony is reputed to be one of the most recognized awards for Africans in film-making. At the 10th edition, she stepped down as CEO of the AMAAs. In 2015, she began the AfricaOne initiative to commemorate Africans in the entertainment industry.

In 2020, she emerged as the National President of The Association of Movie Producers (AMP). This made her the seventh to hold that post succeeding Mr. Ralph Nwadike.

Anyiam Osigwe was the Initiator of 100 films project aimed at improving the quality of films produced in Nigeria.

As the President, she worked on building capacity of film producers in the country through seminars and trainings.

=== Writing career ===
Anyiam-Osigwe was an author of written poetry. She had three books to her credit. In an interview with Alana Herro, she described poetry as one of the avenues for expressing her perception and understanding of things around her. Prior to entering the university, she published a magazine, Clicks, specifically written to accommodate the black population in England. Her works are centered on advocacy causes.

=== Television and film director ===
Anyiam-Osigwe career on television began with her discussion show, Piece off my mind, that focuses on people's reaction to societal issues that are not regularly seen in the mainstream media. Her talk show was centered on issues of advocacy for individuals that the society usually give little attention or neglected. She cited the African caste system, child trafficking and women equality as areas of interest to her in film and television. At the early stage of music duo, P-Square career, Anyiam-Osigwe was responsible for managing them. In 2016, she stated that she represents Somkele Iyamah.

== Personal life and death ==
Her brother, Michael, who was killed in 2014 was the coordinator general of the Osigwe Anyiam-Osigwe Foundation, a non-profit organization that gives back to the Nigerian society. He was also director, Africa Institute for Leadership Research and Development and the consul general of Malawi to Nigeria. Her mother, Dorothy Chinyere Anyiam-Osigwe is a recipient of the Officer of the Order of the Niger honour by the then president, Olusegun Obasanjo for her philanthropic activities in Nigeria. She was separated from her husband.

Anyiam-Osigwe was in a coma since 7 January 2023, and died at St. Nicholas Hospital in Lagos on 9 January, at the age of 53.

== Awards ==
In 2019, she was honoured with African Film Pioneer Award at the African Film Festival, TAFF.
