= Okwelle =

- Nickname: Okwelle
- Location of Okwelle in Nigeria
- Coordinates: 5°45′5″N 7°10′39″E
- Country: Nigeria
- State: Imo
- Local Government Area: Onuimo

Government
  - Governor: SEN.Hope uzodinnma (APC)

Area
  - Land: 8.5 km^{2} (3.3 sq mi)
- ISO 3166 code: NG.IM.OE.OM

Okwelle is a town in Onuimo Local Government Area of Imo State, Nigeria. It comprises original eight villages known as Okwelle "Ama Asato" according to the Colonial documents of 1908 containing the list of "MBAs" "ISI-MBAs" and "ONUMAs" : Therefore the Eight villages were as follows : Umumbo, Umuduruodu, Umuoji, Amaedo, D, Umuduruebo/Umudurajonmai/Umulobi, Umoko/Alaike and Umuagwo/ Umuoma. Okwelle's Central Market (Ekego) attracts traders from neighbouring towns across the States within the SouthEastern Nigeria.

== Location and Boundaries ==
Okwelle is surrounded by major towns including Umunachi, Abba, Dikenafai, Okwe and Ezike. Okwelle has several sources of fresh water, including springs, lakes, inland water channels and seasonal runoffs. According to Floyd Barry, 'from Okwelle, to Imo River, a constriction of the Cuesta landforms takes places, but east again beyond the river, the uplands broaden to a dissected plateau around Bende separated by only a few miles from the Okigwe-Ngusu-Arochukwu Cuesta and related features.'
