= Wence Madu =

Nigerian educationist

- Citizenship: Nigeria
- Occupation: Educationist/ Lecturer

Wence Madu is a Nigerian educationist and charismatic leader. He is the former rector of Imo State Polytechnic.
