= Bennett Okoro =

Anglican bishop of Nigeria

Bennett C I Okoro is an Anglican bishop in Nigeria.

He was born on the 24th of November 1949, in Imo State. Okoro was educated at Union Secondary School, Enugu, the American College and Seminary in Manhattan, New York and Lincoln University. He was ordained in 1976 and served as chaplain to the Federal Teachers College, Lokoja, then Vicar of Christ Church, Lokoja. In 1984, he began working in the Diocese of Orlu and was appointed Canon Residentiary of St. Paul's Cathedral, Nkwerre. In 1988, he became Archdeacon of Etiti. He was elected Bishop of Okigwe South in 1993 and was later translated to Orlu. In 2002, he became Archbishop of Owerri, serving until 2013.

Okoro was consecrated as the pioneer Bishop of Okigwe South on 16 January 1994, at St. Michael's Cathedral, Aba.

He retired as Bishop of Orlu in 2019.
