= Lawrence Obibuaku =

Nigerian academic and professor of Agricultural Extension (1926 - 2021)

Lawrence Onyekele Obibuaku (5 June 1926 – 8 June 2021) was a Nigerian agricultural extension expert, academic and administrator. He was a professor of agricultural extension and inaugural Head of Department of Agricultural Extension, University of Nigeria, Nsukka, UNN and served as Commissioner for Agriculture and Natural Resources of the East Central State of Nigeria. His research interest focused on land tenure systems and socio-economic barriers. University of Nigeria holds memorial lecture in his honour.

== Education ==
Obibuaku received his primary education at St. Patrick’s Primary School, Awo-Omamma, between 1934 and 1939. From 1942 to 1944, he attended St. Anthony’s Teacher Training College in Onitsha. He earned a Bachelor of Science degree from Cornell University in 1960, followed by a Master of Arts degree in 1961 and a Master of Science degree in 1962, both from Michigan State University. In 1965, he obtained a PhD in agricultural extension from the University of Wisconsin. He was also a Fellow of the Agricultural Extension Society of Nigeria (AESON).

== Career ==
Obibuaku began his career in 1952 as a primary school teacher and taught until 1956, when he left Nigeria for the United States for his university education. From 1963 to 1965, he worked as a research assistant in the US while studying for his Ph.D. Following the completion of his post graduate studies, he returned to Nigeria and was appointed as a lecturer at the University of Nigeria, Nsukka (UNN) in 1965.

In 1970, he left UNN following his appointment as Commissioner for Agriculture and Natural Resources, East Central State and served on the supreme ruling executive council of the region. After completing his tenure as commissioner in 1972, he returned to the university and was appointed as an Associate Professor of agricultural extension in 1975. He introduced Agricultural Extension as a distinct discipline and led the establishment of the Department of Agricultural Extension in the university in 1978 and was appointed as the inaugural head of the department serving until 1983.

In 1977, he served on the federal government of Nigeria 11-member Land Use Panel to review Nigeria land tenure system. The findings and recommendations of the panel led to the enactment of the Land Use Act of 1978.Obibuaku was promoted to the rank of full professor of Agricultural Extension at UNN in 1980. He retired from the university in 1991.

He was a member of the Governing Council of the Michael Okpara College of Agriculture. He co-founded the Agricultural Extension Society of Nigeria (AESON) in 1998 and was a member of the Poultry Science Association. In 2026, UNN started a memorial lecture in his honour.

== Publications ==
- Agricultural Extension as a Strategy for Agricultural Transformation, University of Nigeria Press, 1983, ISBN 9789782299086
- An Analysis of Agricultural Extension Potentials in Selected Villages in the Western State of Nigeria, Agricultural and Food Sciences, 1974
- The effect of land tenure on agricultural extension work in some villages of the East Central State of Nigeria, Oxford Agrarian Studies, 1975, Volume 4, - Issue 2
- Group Farming: A Novel Approach to the Solution of Agricultural and Youth Settlement Problems in Nigeria, 1977
- Communication Sources and Agricultural Change in Some Rural Communities of Imo State of Nigeria, Oxford Agrarian Studies, 1978, Volume 7, - Issue 1
- The Effect of Furadroxyl on the Performance of Laying Hens, Poultry Science, 1966, Volume 45, Issue 3, Pages 561–565
- The Place of Agricultural Extension in Nigerian Agricultural Development, 1989
- Education and Training in the Nigerian Agricultural Extension Service, Public Administration and Development, 1975: Volume 14, Issue 2
- Socio-economic problems in the adoption process: introduction of a hydraulic palm oil press, Rural Sociology, 32, 4 (1967), pp. 464–468
- Management and Abuse in Bureaucratic Extension Agencies,1991
- The Institutional Framework for Transfer of Agricultural Technology to Resource-Poor Farmers in Nigeria,1992, Journal of Extension Systems, Vol. 8, (1 & 2), pp 103–113
