= Isiekenesi =

Town in Imo state, Nigeria

- Location of Isiekenesi in Nigeria
- Coordinates: 5°47′36″N 7°7′55″E
- Country: Nigeria
- State: Imo
- Local Government Area: Ideato South

Government
  - Governor: Hope Uzodinma (APC)

Isiekenesi, is a community in Ideato South Local Government Area of Imo State, Nigeria.

== Infrastructure ==
By 2009, poor access roads was identified as one of the key constraints militating against optimal performance in informal economic activities amongst rural women of Isiekenesi, Dikenafai, Mgbidi, Nkwerre, Amiri, Otulu and other communities in Orlu senatorial zone of Imo State. Other problems identified included electricity, portable water and lack of credit facilities to small markets. Land tenure problems were also identified as one of the greatest factors that hindered development of large-scale farming in the zone.

== Notable people ==
- Everest Okpara - entrepreneur and philanthropist
