= Agwuocha =

Agwuocha is a Nigerian surname. Notable people with the surname include:

- George White Agwuocha (born 1993), Nigerian football player
- Noel Agwuocha Chukwukadibia (born 1959), Nigerian lawyer, politician and author
