= Bright Joseph Egemasi Ogu =

Anglican bishop of Nigeria

Bright Joseph Egemasi Ogu was an Anglican bishop in Nigeria.

Ogu was educated at the Theological College of Northern Nigeria. He was Bishop of Mbaise from 1999 to 2010, when he retired and was succeeded by Chamberlain Ogunado.
