= Chinwe Obaji =

Federal Minister of Education
- In office June 2005 – June 2006
- Preceded by: Fabian Osuji
- Succeeded by: Obiageli Ezekwesili

Personal details
- Party: People's Democratic Party (PDP)

Chinwe Obaji is a higher education lecturer, teacher and education administrator who was appointed to head Nigeria's Federal Ministry of Education in June 2005 as Senior Minister, and was succeeded a year later by Obiageli Ezekwesili.

== Background ==
Chinwe Obaji was born in Ezinihitte-Mbaise in Imo State. She graduated from the University of Nigeria, Nsukka in 1975. From 1980 she was a lecturer and administrator at Michael Okpara College of Agriculture, Umuagwo, Imo State in Nigeria.

== Ministerial position ==
Chinwe Obaji was the first female education Minister in Nigeria. As the Education Minister, she made efforts to resuscitate the Inspectorate Division of the Federal Ministry of Education. She started the one-meal-a-day project in some pilot primary schools across the country.

She directed that Universities should administer the Post University Matriculation Examination to candidate students in an effort by bypass the inefficiency of the Joint Admission and Matriculation Board (JAMB). Notably, in support of her directive.

However, there was controversy over the fees charged by universities for the test. In an October 2005 meeting between the Federal Ministry of Education, the National Universities Commission (NUC) and Joint Admission and Matriculation Board, it was unanimously agreed to peg the test fee at N1,000. Answering questions in the House of Representative in November 2005, Chinwe Obaji said that any university that collected more than N1,000 from candidates seeking admission after the post JAMB screening had done so in violation of her directive. The House of Representations later cancelled the directive.

In April 2006, Chinwe Obaji detailed reforms to the design of the basic education system to ensure that every Nigerian child at least has access to basic education. The government set up a system of reprimanding parents who do not register their children for school, and started to recruit 40,000 teachers for rural communities. She stated that the Universal Basic Education (UBE) program aimed at enhancing "unhindered access to quality basic education to the children, especially to the girl-child".

== Subsequent positions ==
Dr Chinwe Obaji was appointed Professor of International Education at the Voorhees College in the USA starting in 2007.
