= Omuma town =

Omuma
- Town
- Location in Nigeria
- Coordinates: 5°33′36″N 6°58′19″E
- Country: Nigeria
- State: Imo State
- Local Government Area: Oru East

Government
  - Traditional ruler: Eze of Omuma (Dede Igbo)
- Included within Oru East LGA population estimate of 184,880 (projection)
- Time zone: UTC+1 (WAT)
- Postal code: 474109

Omuma is a town in the Oru East Local Government Area of Imo State, Nigeria, and serves as the administrative headquarters of the LGA. Geographically, the town lies at approximately 5.56°N 6.97°E, placing it within the central Oru cultural zone of southeastern Imo State. Omuma is predominantly inhabited by Igbo-speaking populations and is characterised by an agrarian economy based on yam, cassava, and oil-palm cultivation, alongside communal governance structures typical of rural Igbo societies. Christianity represented by Catholic, Anglican, and Pentecostal denominations remains the dominant religion in the town.

The primary entrance route into Omuma is via the Mgbidi–Awo-Omamma–Omuma roadway corridor, which connects the town to Orlu and onward to regional highways, forming its main access point for travellers and commercial transport.

== History ==
Omuma’s origins are linked to early Igbo agrarian settlements, where yam cultivation, palm produce processing, and root crop farming enabled permanent habitation and population clustering in the area. Archaeological and ethnographic studies on early Igbo societies note that subsistence agriculture formed the foundation of settlement patterns across the southeastern forest belt, with communities developing around fertile lowland regions suitable for yam cultivation.

The wider Oru cultural area, including Omuma, evolved through lineage-based kinship structures, compound settlements, and age-grade systems that organised labour, communal security, and governance features documented as characteristic of traditional Igbo socio-political organisation in southeastern Nigeria.

During the period of British colonial administration (1900–1960), Omuma fell under the jurisdiction of the Eastern Region and was administered through the Owerri/Orlu provincial structure, which introduced indirect rule, warrant chiefs, and colonial taxation across the region. Colonial road networks and administrative reforms linked rural settlements such as Omuma to district headquarters, reshaping local governance and trade.

The Nigerian Civil War (1967–1970) had significant effects on the broader Imo–Orlu axis, where population displacement, agricultural disruption, and military activity were recorded across communities in the former Eastern Region. Contemporary historical research identifies the Orlu corridor as a key logistical zone during the conflict, affecting mobility and settlement patterns in surrounding towns, including Omuma.

Following the post-war restructuring of Nigeria, the creation of Imo State in 1976 reorganised provincial boundaries and administrative divisions. Subsequent decentralisation led to the establishment of Oru East Local Government Area in 1996, with Omuma formally designated as its administrative headquarters.

Traditional authority in Omuma remains vested in the office of the Eze of Omuma, who presides over customary matters, cultural festivals such as the New Yam celebrations, and dispute mediation through a council of chiefs and community associations, a structure consistent with Igbo traditional governance across Imo State.

=== Historical timeline ===
- Pre-15th century (before c. 1434) – The area that would become Omuma forms part of early Igbo agrarian settlements, characterised by yam cultivation, palm produce, and lineage-based village communities typical of southern Igboland.
- 1900–1960 – Incorporated into the Owerri Province under British colonial administration.
- 1967–1970 – Impacted by the Nigerian Civil War, including population displacement and disruptions to agricultural and commercial activity.
- 1976 – Creation of Imo State reorganises administrative boundaries within the former East Central State.
- 1996 – Establishment of Oru East Local Government Area, with Omuma formally designated as the LGA headquarters.
- 2021 – Imo State Polytechnic extends operations to the Omuma Campus.
- 2025 – Establishment of the Imo State University of Innovation, Science and Technology (ISUIST), Omuma.

== Geographical Location ==
Omuma lies in a rainforest savanna ecological transition zone marked by fertile soils, palm vegetation, and seasonal crops. Its boundaries are shared with Mgbidi (west), Nempi and Eleh (north), Akatta and Attah (east), and Amiri and Otulu (south). Elevations range between 50 and 100 metres above sea level.

== Communities ==
Omuma consists of four principal autonomous communities:

Community	Coordinates
Abia-Omuma	5°59′38″N 6°59′12″E
Ozuh-Omuma	5°59′21″N 6°59′45″E
Umuhu-Omuma	5°58′56″N 6°59′30″E
Etiti-Omuma	5°59′10″N 6°58′52″E

== Demography ==
Omuma contributes to the Oru East LGA projected population of 184,880. The population is predominantly Igbo and Christian, represented by Catholic, Anglican and Pentecostal denominations.

== Government and administration ==
As the LGA headquarters, Omuma hosts the Oru East Local Government Secretariat and administrative offices. The LGA Chairman elected in 2024 is Nnamdi Okaraigwe of the APC. Civic engagement is driven by youth associations, market unions and women’s groups, which support social welfare and community development.

== Economy ==
Agriculture dominates Omuma’s economy, with major crops including yam, cassava, maize, taro, rubber, and oil palm. Small-scale agro-processing (palm oil milling, garri production), sawmills, bread factories, and bottled water companies support local employment.

The bi-weekly Orie Omuma Market acts as a major commercial hub and has undergone infrastructural upgrades, including new stalls and a motorised borehole system.

Oil and gas deposits have been identified in the Njaba River basin, which includes parts of Oru East LGA.

== Culture and festivals ==
Omuma reflects wider Igbo cultural traditions, with communal life centred on kinship groups, village squares and ritual observances. Music and dance are integral features of public ceremonies, incorporating drums, ogene gongs and call-and-response performances consistent with cultural practices across southeastern Nigeria.

Masquerade displays (mmanwụ) are performed during seasonal celebrations, funerary rites and festivals, functioning both as entertainment and as ritual expressions linked to ancestral honour and social order.

The annual New Yam Festival (Iri Ji)—typically observed between July and September—marks the start of the harvest cycle and includes ceremonial cutting of the first yam, thanksgiving rites, feasting and public performances. The festival reflects the historical and economic importance of yam in Igbo society.

=== Age-grade system ===
Omuma maintains an age-grade (ọgbọ́) structure characteristic of many Igbo communities, in which people of similar age cohorts are organised into formally recognised groups that undertake social and developmental functions. Scholarly research identifies age-grade institutions in southeastern Nigeria as playing roles in communal labour, public works, conflict mediation and cultural preservation.

Academic work on Igbo naming traditions also references the Igbo community in Omuma, Oru East, as part of studies examining how age-grade identities encode collective memory, values and social responsibility.

=== Cultural associations ===
Modern community-based organisations in Omuma operate alongside traditional structures and are part of broader civil society networks documented across Imo State. Such associations often support cultural events, youth engagement and self-help development projects in rural communities, reflecting Igbo patterns of grassroots cultural organisation in southeastern Nigeria.

== Education ==
=== Primary schools ===
- Ozuh Primary School, Ozuh-Omuma
- Abia Central School, Abia-Omuma
- Community Primary School, Amaodum Etiti-Omuma
- Umuhu Primary School, Umuhu-Omuma
- Powerline Primary School, Abia-Omuma
- Omuma Central School, Omuma
- Trinity Primary School, Omuma

=== Secondary schools ===
- Omuma Community Secondary School
- Divine Favour Secondary School, Omuma
- Holy Trinity Secondary School, Omuma
- Omuma Technical College, Omuma
- Uche Stenography Academy, Umuhu-Omuma
- Omuma Secondary Technical School, Omuma

=== Tertiary institutions ===
- Imo State Polytechnic, Omuma Campus – offers ND/HND programmes.
- Imo State University of Innovation, Science and Technology (ISUIST), Omuma – approved by the NUC on 20 October 2025.

== Infrastructure ==
Omuma is served by a network of regional roads that link the town to key urban centres in Imo State, including Owerri, the state capital located approximately 40 kilometres to the south, and Orlu roughly 30 kilometres to the west. These transport corridors form part of the internal road system within Oru East Local Government Area and facilitate the movement of agricultural produce, goods, and commuters across the region.

Public utility development in Omuma has progressed incrementally, with notable interventions targeted at commercial zones such as the Orie Omuma Market area. A government-funded project delivered a motorised borehole system equipped with an overhead storage tank and a power-generating unit to enhance water access and support market activities.

Telecommunication services in the town are provided by major national operators, including MTN and Airtel, which maintain mobile voice and data coverage throughout Oru East LGA.

== Notable people ==
- Hope Uzodinma, Governor of Imo State (2020–present).

== Postal code ==
474109
