= Austin Nosike =

Vice-chancellor

Austin N. Nosike
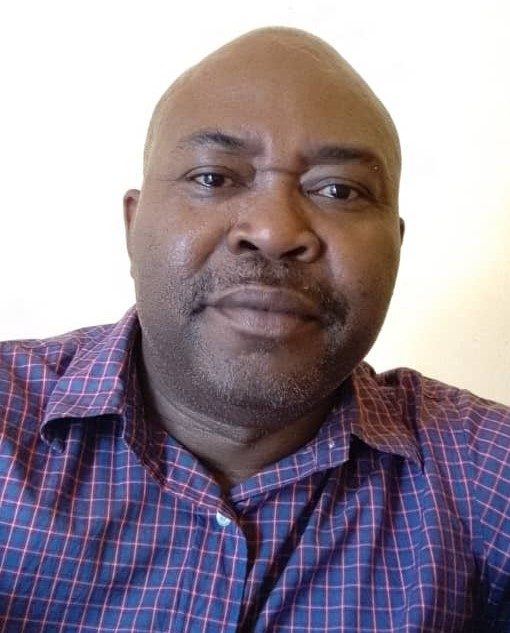
- Born: 23 March 1972 (age 54); Owerri-Imo State, Nigeria
- Occupations: Academician, administrator and consultant
- Title: Vice-Chancellor

Academic background
- Education: University of Nigeria; Central University of Nicaragua; Universidad Católica San Antonio de Murcia

Academic work
- Discipline: Economics and management

Austin N. Nosike (born 23 March 1972) is a Nigerian Professor of Economics and Management, and the 2nd substantive Vice-Chancellor of James Hope University, Lagos.

== Education ==
Nosike had his early education in Imo State before proceeding to the University of Nigeria, Nsukka (UNN), where he graduated with a Bachelor of Science (BSc) in 1993. He received his postgraduate education at Imo State University, Owerri; Rivers State University of Science and Technology (RSUT), Port Harcourt; Universidad Católica de Murcia (UCAM), Spain; Central European University (CEU), Budapest, Hungary; and the International Institute of Human Rights, Strasbourg, France. He obtained his PhD in Economics from the Central University of Nicaragua, Managua, and another PhD in Business Administration from Universidad Azteca, Mexico.

== Career ==
Nosike worked as a Freelance Reporter at The Statesman and Daily Star Newspapers and later as an Assistant Editor at Newsflash Magazine.

He began his lecturing career in 1994 at Kaduna Polytechnic, Kaduna State, and later served as a visiting lecturer at the Nigerian Defence Academy, Kaduna.

He has worked as Dean of the School of Graduate Studies at the University of Kigali, Rwanda; Director of Partnerships, Collaboration and Linkages at Uganda Pentecostal University, Fort Portal; and as Director of Research, Innovation and Consultancy at Metropolitan International University (MIU). He also served as a Visiting Professor at Kigali Independent University, University of Mkar and Uganda Technology and Management University (UTAMU).

Nosike was formerly Registrar at Kayiwa International University(KINTU),Kampala-Uganda. He served as Deputy Vice-Chancellor (Academics and Research) at the International University of Equator (IUE), Bujumbura, Burundi, and at Copperstone University (CU), Kitwe, Zambia. In 2025, the Governing Board of the African Institute of Management, Technology and Development Studies (AIMTDS) appointed him as President and Member of the Council.
