= Everest Okpara =

Dr. Everest Okpara
- Born: December 22, 1973 (age 52); Isiekenesi, Ideato South, Imo State, Nigeria
- Education: Lagos State University
- Occupations: Entrepreneur, philanthropist
- Known for: Medical diagnostics; healthcare philanthropy
- Title: Managing director and CEO, Everight Diagnostic & Laboratory Services Ltd
- Spouse: Roseline Okpara
- Website: everightlab.com

Everest Okpara is a Nigerian entrepreneur and philanthropist known for his work in medical diagnostics and healthcare sector in Nigeria. He is the founder and chief executive officer of Everight Diagnostic & Laboratory Services Ltd and the founder of Everight Healthcare Foundation, a non-profit organisation involved in community medical outreach in Nigeria. He was the president of the Owerri Chamber of Commerce, Industry, Mines and Agriculture (OCCIMA).

== Early life and education ==
Everest Okpara was born in Isiekenesi, in Ideato South Local Government Area of Imo State, and was raised in a small household in which he helped with his mother's catering business. He attended Community Primary School, Dimagu, and National Secondary School Ntueke in his home area, before moving into business and healthcare entrepreneurship.

Okpara earned a bachelor's degree in Industrial Relations and Personnel Management at Lagos State University and later undertook coursework or short programmes in public-health related topics, including biostatistics and epidemiology at the Johns Hopkins Bloomberg School of Public Health, USA. He also completed a Healthcare Management program at Lagos Business School and earned an MBA and a PhD from Charisma University, USA.

== Career ==
Everest Okpara founded Everight Diagnostic & Laboratory Services Ltd in 2005; under his leadership the organisation expanded to operate diagnostic centres in Owerri, Lagos and Abuja and added molecular-testing capability during the COVID-19 pandemic.

During the COVID-19 pandemic, Everight was listed among private laboratories contributing PCR testing in Nigeria and appears in multiple Nigeria Centre for Disease Control (NCDC) situational reports as an active testing centre for inbound/outbound travellers and routine testing at different times in 2021–2022. The Medical Laboratory Science Council of Nigeria (MLSCN) records show the laboratory's ISO15189 accreditation certificate for its Wuse 2 (Abuja) facility.

Okpara also founded the Everight Healthcare Foundation, a non-profit organisation which runs free medical testing, community health outreach, and public health education in Nigeria.

He is also the founder of Sangtech Technologies Nigeria Ltd, a healthcare-focused technology firm for developing e-health solutions, diagnostics automation and electronic health-record systems to support digitally-enabled healthcare delivery in Nigeria.

In 2019 Okpara became the substantive president of the Owerri Chamber of Commerce, Industry, Mines and Agriculture (OCCIMA); this appointment and his role in local organised private-sector bodies were reported in national and local business publications.

== Recognition and Accreditation ==
- The Everight laboratory in Abuja is recorded as having achieved ISO 15189 accreditation (MLSCN/Assessment Documentation) and Everight Lab was among private laboratories approved or referenced in NCDC COVID-19 testing lists used during the pandemic response.
- Everest Okpara received an award of appreciation from Gulf Medical University in the UAE on February 1, 2025.
- He was invited to speak at the UK International Health Summit in Liverpool on February 14, 2025.
