= Benjamin Chinedum Okeke =

Anglican bishop of Nigeria

Benjamin Chinedum Okeke is an Anglican bishop in Nigeria.

Okeke was educated at Archdeacon Denis Junior Seminary. He was elected Bishop of Orlu to succeed Bennett Okoro on 23 August 2019 at St. Peter's Chapel, Ibru International Ecumenical Centre, Agbarha Otor, Delta State, and consecrated at All Saints Anglican Church Amaifeke, Orlu in September 2019.
