= Jim Ovia =

Nigerian businessman (born 1951)

Jim Ovia CFR CON
- Born: Jim James Ovia; 4 November 1951 (age 74); Agbor, Delta State, Nigeria
- Occupation: Businessman

Jim James Ovia CFR CON (born 4 November 1951) is a Nigerian businessman and author. He is the founder of Zenith Bank, which he founded in 1990, and is now the country's most profitable bank.

In 2018, Ovia published what he described as an "entrepreneurial manual" he called Africa Rise and Shine. His memoir also tells about his early life, his business career and how he developed Zenith Bank and other related interests.

== Early life and education ==
James "Jim" Ovia was born in 1951 into the large family of Obi Olihe of Agbor-Obi, in what is now Agbor, Delta State. His father died when he was four, and older siblings helped support their mother and the family. One elder brother paid for his early education. Ovia later moved to Lagos to live with that brother and started work as a clerk in a bank.

After three years, he traveled to the United States for college and graduate school, earning a B.Sc. degree in Business Administration from Southern University, Baton Rouge, Louisiana (1977), and an MBA from the University of Louisiana, Monroe, in 1979. He is also an alumnus of Harvard Business School.

== Career ==
Jim is the founder of Zenith Bank Plc, Nigeria's tier-1 bank and one of the most profitable financial institutions in Nigeria. In 2010, he assumed chairmanship of the bank. In 2021, James Hope University, Lagos, which he founded, was approved by the Federal Government and given operating licence by the National Universities Commission (NUC). He was the recipient of a Nigerian national honor.

Ovia is the founder of Visafone Communications Limited and the chairman of both the Nigerian Software Development Initiative (NSDI) and the National Information Technology Advisory Council (NITAC). He is a member of the Honorary International Investor Council as well as the Digital Bridge Institute (DBI). He is the Chairman of Cyberspace Network Limited. He was awarded an honorary doctorate degree in the 50th convocation ceremony of the University of Lagos.

In September 2018, Ovia announced the publication of his book Africa, Rise and Shine published with ForbesBooks.

He is the founder and chancellor of the private Nigerian varsity, James Hope University, which was licensed in 2021.

== Leadership roles ==
Ovia is a member of the Governing Council of Lagos State University, Lagos and a member of the Board of Trustees, Redeemer's University For Nations, Lagos. He was a member of the Governing Council of the Nigerian Investment Promotion Commission (1999–2007) and served on the board of American International School, Lagos (2001–2003).

Ovia headed numerous NGOs at various times including serving as the first President of the Nigeria Internet Group (2001–2003). He is the founder and Chairman of Mankind United to Support Total Education (MUSTE), a philanthropic organization focused on providing scholarships to the less privileged. He is the founder of the Youth Empowerment / ICT Foundation, which focuses on improving the socioeconomic welfare of Nigerian youths by inspiring and motivating them to embrace Information and communication technology.

== Award ==
In October 2022, Jim Ovia was conferred with the Nigerian national honor of Commander of the Order of the Federal Republic (CFR) by President Muhammadu Buhari.

In March 2025 he was awarded the Freedom of the City of London for his global financial impact.
