= Chukwuma Oparah =

Anglican bishop (born 1969)

Chukwuma Chinekezi Oparah // is an Anglican bishop in Nigeria.

Oparah is the current Bishop of Owerri.

He was born on 26 October 1969 in Dimoma Obuzi, Amankuta Mbieri in Mbaitoli, Imo State.

He has a PhD in Biblical Studies and an MA in Religious Studies from the University of Uyo and a BA from the University of Nigeria, Nsukka, a Diploma in Theology from Trinity (Union) Theological College, Umuahia and a Bachelor’s Degree in Theology from Trinity College of Ministerial Arts, Aba.

He was Archdeacon of Ibeama Ogwa Archdeaconry until he was elected Bishop of Owerri on 18 September 2018 at the Cathedral Church of St. Peter's, Minna, Diocese of Minna, Niger State.
