= Benjamin Nwankiti =

Anglican bishop of Nigeria

The Most Reverend Benjamin Nwankiti
- Archbishop emeritus of the Province 2 of the Church of Nigeria
- Church: Church of Nigeria
- See: Owerri, Nigeria
- In office: 1997–1998
- Previous post: Bishop of Owerri

Orders
- Ordination: 1956
- Consecration: April 25, 1968

Personal details
- Born: 1928 Atta, Nigeria
- Died: December 6, 2004 (aged 76) Owerri, Nigeria
- Children: 3

Benjamin C. Nwankiti (1928 in Atta – 6 December 2004 in Owerri) was a Nigerian Anglican archbishop. He was married, had three children and several grandchildren.

== Ecclesiastical career ==
He was ordained as an Anglican priest in 1952. Nwankiti served on the Niger and was stationed at Enugu, where he worked at the Religious Department of the Nigerian Broadcasting Corporation. He was elected the first Nigerian bishop of the Diocese of Owerri in January 1968, and consecrated on 25 April 1968, at All Saints Cathedral Church in Egbu, as assistant bishop to George Cockin. He succeeded Cockin as bishop on 1 January 1969. He was Bishop of Owerri until 13 December 1998, when he retired, aged 70 years old. In 1997, he was consecrated as archbishop of the Province 2 of the Church of Nigeria, when the province was divided in three ecclesiastical provinces. He retired in 1998 and was replaced as archbishop of the Province 2 by J. A. Onyemelukwe.

Nwankiti died in Owerri, aged 76 years old, and was buried at the Cathedral Church of the Transfiguration of Our Lord (CATOL) Owerri.

He published A Short Story of the Christian Church (1965). Nwankiti's life was the subject of the book A Good Shepherd (2003), by Ernest Emenyonu.
