= Chike Olemgbe =

Speaker of the 10th Imo State House of Assembly

Chike Olemgbe is a Nigerian politician currently serving as the speaker of the 10th Imo State House of Assembly since June 2023. A member of the All Progressives Congress (APC), Olemgbe is representing Ihitte/Uboma State Constituency in the state house of assembly. He is a first term member of the house. Olemgbe was nominated for the speakership position by Vitalis Azodo of the APC representing Ideato South constituency and seconded by Ugochukwu Obodo also of the APC representing Owerri Municipal constituency. He was unanimously elected to the speakership.

Olemgbe previously served as Transition Committee Chairman of Ihitte/ Uboma local government area before being elected to the Imo State House of Assembly in the 2023 state assemblies elections.
