= James Aneke =

Nigerian politician

James Nwabueze John Aneke

Military Governor of Imo State
- In office 9 December 1993 – 22 August 1996
- Preceded by: Evan Enwerem
- Succeeded by: Tanko Zubairu

Personal details
- Born: Kano State, British Nigeria
- Education: University of Lagos, University of Portsmouth, National Defence College, Nigeria

Military service
- Allegiance: Nigeria
- Branch/service: Nigerian Navy
- Rank: Commodore
- Unit: Engineering Branch
- Commands: Nigerian Navy Training Command
- Battles/wars: Nigerian Civil War

James Nwabueze John Aneke is a retired flag officer of the Nigerian Navy. He served as the Military Governor of Imo State in Nigeria from December 1993 to August 1996. He was Commandant of Nigerian Naval Engineering College (NNEC), Sapele, Delta State.

== Background ==
James Aneke had his secondary and higher school education at St. Johns College, Kaduna now Rimi College Kaduna State and Government College, Umuahia in Abia State respectively. He graduated from University of Lagos in 1973 with a BSC (Hons) Electrical Engineering and was a Pioneer Member of the National Youth Service Corps Scheme in 1973 started by the Federal Military Government under the leadership of General Yakubu Gowon. He is married to Julie Nnenna (née Orji).

== Naval career ==
On joining the Officer Corps of the Nigerian Navy, he attended several courses and training with the Royal Navy in the United Kingdom and Hollandse Signaalapparaten B.V. (now Thales Nederland B.V.) in Netherlands with Manufacturers and Suppliers of naval defence systems (sensors, radars and infrared systems). He served Nigerian Navy on board Flagship NNS Nigeria as a watch keeper, NNS Enyimiri and NNS Aradu as head of department: weapons engineer officer and other platforms.

== Ashore appointment ==
He was a member of the erstwhile Nigerian Football Association (NFA) now known as the Nigeria Football Federation, which led the Nigerian Eaglets to their Pioneer edition of FIFA U-16 World Championship Kodak Cup (1985). In 1993 as a Navy Captain he was appointed governor of Imo State from December 1993 to August 1996. His administration in Imo State undertook several key projects. One of these was the completion of and Operationalizing the Imo Airport for Full Commercial Flights. Its commissioning was by Head of State, General Sani Abacha on 15 July 1994. The Airport was begun by earlier administrations with the full financial and moral support of the good people of old Imo State (now, Imo, Abia and Southern Ebonyi States) and with immense support from the Federal Military Government. Other key projects include the Supretending over their transition periods to full takeover by the Federal Government of the State Polytechnic at Nekede (now Federal Polytechnic) and General Hospital Owerri (now Federal Medical Center). Undertaken during his tenure was the employment of 1000 Young Graduates of different disciplines into the Public Service and the Rehabilitation of schools and improvement of the Welfare of teachers in the three tiers: Primary, Secondary and Tertiary levels. To his Administration is owed the honoring of acclaimed Imo State achievers in various fields. Hence the naming of the Owerri Township Stadium after Nigeria's erstwhile football captain, "DAN ANYIAM". He acquired a land area of 53 hectares for a model Workers' Haven. It now houses the Redemption Estate along the Owerri - Port Harcourt Express, which was developed by a later administration.

== Later career ==
He was retired in July 1999 by a policy that affected all Officers who had held Political appointments during the Military era. He was also appointed to the board of Summa Guaranty and Trust Plc. He spends his retirement on part-time Real Estate Consultancy. He is a fellow of the Nigerian Society of Engineers and a member of the Enugu State Advisory Council.

== See also ==
- List of governors of Imo State
