= Anglican Diocese of Oru =

Anglican diocese in Nigeria

Diocese of Anglican Diocese of Oru

Location
- Country: Nigeria
- Headquarters: ?
- Denomination: ?

Current leadership
- Bishop: Geoffrey Chukwunenye

The Anglican Diocese of Oru is one of twelve within the Anglican Province of Owerri, itself one of fourteen ecclesiastical provinces within the Church of Nigeria. The current bishop is the Right Rev. Geoffrey Chukwunenye.

== History ==
In October 2020, Chukwunenye called on the Nigerian government to review a power concession agreement during an address at the 3rd session of the 4th synod of the diocese. At the same session, held in St. Thomas Church in Omuma, Hope Uzodinma asked for local citizens and residents to be patient over roads, saying that road work would begin once the rains stop, in addition to calling ecumenism "the panacea to societal unity and harmonious coexistence", warning against greed, and informing the Anglican bishops about Imo's state of affairs.

In May 2021, Chukwunenye said that criticisms of southern governors' ban of open grazing and support of restructuring were selfish and primitive during an address at the 1st session of the 5th synod of the diocese. In the same month, he called for the government to revisit workers' salary and pensions.

== Notes ==
The Headquarters and seat of the diocese is "MGBIDI" in Oru West Local government area, Imo State, Nigeria. The Denomination is officially "ANGLICAN".
