= Egbema =

Town in Nigeria

Egbema is a town in Ohaji/Egbema, Local Government Areas of Imo State, Nigeria.

Egbema
| LGA | Ohaji/Egbema |
| State | Imo State |
| Country | Nigeria |
| Time zone | UTC+1 (WAT) |

== Infrastructure ==
Egbema being a town in the Niger Delta region of Southern Nigeria, richly blessed with Natural Resources, and Abundance of Oil and Gas has attracted several projects including; Egbema Power Plant, -The Assa North-Ohaji South project (ANOH).

== Population ==
As of 2019, Egbema has an estimated population of over 375,837 people in the densely populated village.
