= Priscilla Nzimiro =

Nigerian medical doctor (1923–1951)

- Born: Ada Priscilla Nzimiro; 30 April 1923; Port Harcourt, British Nigeria
- Died: 22 March 1951 (aged 27); Glasgow Royal Infirmary, Scotland
- Education: University of Glasgow
- Occupation: Physician
- Known for: First woman doctor to work in the Igbo region of Nigeria
- Parents: Richard Okwosha Nzimiro (father); Mary Nwametu Onumonu (mother)

Ada Priscilla Nzimiro // (30 April 1923 – 22 March 1951) was a Nigerian medical doctor with family roots in Oguta, present-day Imo State. She attended the University of Glasgow and earned her Bachelor of Medicine, Bachelor of Surgery (MB ChB) in 1950. She was the first woman from Igboland to graduate as a medical doctor. Nzimiro is said to have died an unnatural death a year after she graduated.

== Early life and education ==
Nzimiro was born in Port Harcourt, the present-day capital of Rivers State on 30 April 1923. She was the daughter of Richard Nzimiro and his wife Mary Nwametu Onumonu. Her step-siblings were Richard, Ifediora, and Nnamdi, all male. Her father was a politician who served as the first mayor of Port Harcourt from 1956 until his death in 1959. Her mother, a wealthy merchant, traded palm oil, salt and European manufactured goods. Mary met Richard Nzimiro while attending elementary school at St. Joseph's Girls' Convent in Asaba City and married him in 1920 after her graduation.

In 1945, Nzimiro enrolled at the University of Glasgow in Scotland for her university education where she studied medicine. She graduated MB ChB in 1950 and became the first woman from Igboland to qualify as a medical doctor.

== Death ==
On 22 March 1951, Nzimiro died in Glasgow Royal Infirmary at the age of 27. Her death was a shock to many people including her parents, relatives and well-wishers. Later reports suggested that the cause of her death was unnatural. She was buried in Oguta on 27 April 1951.

== Legacy ==
After Nzimiro's death, the William Wilberforce Academy (WWA), which was the first of two secondary schools her parents established at Oguta in 1945, was renamed Priscilla Memorial Grammar School. This was done in honour of her memory and to record her achievement in the field of medicine. As the first female medical doctor from her region, Nzimiro inspired many young women to pursue medicine as a career.
