= Mary Nzimiro =

Nigerian businesswoman and politician

- Born: Mary Nwametu Onumonu; 16 October 1898; Oguta, Imo State, British Nigeria
- Died: 16 January 1993 (aged 94); Oguta, Imo State Nigeria
- Education: Sacred Heart School, Oguta; Convent School, Asaba
- Occupations: Businesswoman; Politician; Women's activist
- Known for: Richest individuals in early 1950s West Africa
- Political party: NCNC
- Spouse: Richard Okwosha Nzimiro
- Children: Priscilla Nzimiro
- Parents: Onumonu Uzoaru (father); Ruth Onumonu (mother)

Mary Nzimiro, birthname Mary Nwametu Onumonu, MBE (1898–1993) was a pioneering Nigerian businesswoman, politician and women's activist. In 1948, she was appointed principal representative of the United Africa Company (UAC) for Eastern Nigeria, while maintaining textile and cosmetics retail outlets of her own in Port Harcourt, Aba and Owerri. By the early 1950s, she was among the richest individuals in West Africa, becoming a resident of the exclusive Bernard Carr Street in Port Harcourt. On the political front, she was a member of the influential National Council of Nigeria and the Cameroons, becoming a member of its executive committee in 1957 and vice-president of the NCNC Eastern Women's Association in 1962. During the Nigerian Civil War (1967–1970), she organized Igbo women in support of the Biafrans. As a result she lost most of her property in Port Harcourt and returned to her native Oguta where she died in 1993.

== Early life ==
Born on 16 October 1898 in Oguta, Imo State, Mary Nwametu Onumonu was the daughter of the Igbo chief Onumonu Uzoaru, a colonial warrant chief, and his wife Ruth, a successful trader in palm produce. The first of six children, she attended the Sacred Heart School in Oguta followed by the Convent School in Asaba, where she graduated in 1920. Shortly afterwards she married Richard Nzimiro who worked as a clerk for the UAC.

== Career ==
Trained to enter business by her mother, when her husband's job took them to Illah, she traded in salt and palm oil which she sold in the markets of Nkwo and Eke. After relocating to Onitsha and Opobo, they finally settled in Port Harcourt in the mid-1940s. Her husband gave up his desk job to help Mary Nzimiro with her business. In the commercially-developed city, she was able to trade in textiles, gunpowder and cosmetics. As a result of her sense of business and her reputation for trustworthiness, she became an agent of the UAC, becoming the company's main representative for Nigeria's Eastern Region in 1948. In this capacity, she sold bulk consignments of goods to wholesalers and retailers in Nigeria, Ghana and Sierra Leone. She also opened her own textile and cosmetics retail outlets in Port Harcourt and neighbouring cities.

The UAC directors arranged for her to make several business trips to London, Manchester and Glasgow. In addition, she opened two petrol stations, one with Agip in Port Harcourt, the other with Total in Lagos. Mary Nzimiro became one the richest individuals in West Africa with several real estate assets in Port Harcourt, including her own residence on the city's exclusive Bernard Carr Street. She was able to offer scholarships to students and helped many of her female apprentices to enter business themselves. Together with her husband, in 1945 she opened a school in Oguta, later renamed Priscilla Memorial Grammar School in memory of her daughter Priscilla Nzimiro who died shortly after graduating in medicine from the University of Glasgow. In 1966, following the death of her husband who died in 1959, she established the Nzimiro Memorial Girls Secondary School.

On the political front, she was a member of the influential National Council of Nigeria and the Cameroons, becoming a member of its executive committee in 1957 and vice-president of the NCNC Eastern Women's Association in 1962. During the Nigerian Civil War (1967–1970), she organized Igbo women in support of the Biafrans. As a result she lost most of her property in Port Harcourt and returned to her native Oguta where she died on 16 January 1993, aged 95.
