= Cyril Chukwuka Anyanwu =

Anglican bishop in Nigeria

Cyril Chukwuka Anyanwu // was an Anglican bishop in Nigeria.

Ogunedo was educated at and ordained in 1963. He was the pioneer Bishop of Mbaise from 1994 until his death in 1999.
