= Hezekiah University =

Private university in Imo

Coordinates: 5.7608°N 7.1417°E

- Motto: Academic Excellence with Good Morals
- Established: 2015
- Chancellor: Prof. Daddy Hezekiah OON
- Vice-Chancellor: Prof. Enoch Ajunwa
- Location: Umudi, Nkwerre, Imo State, Nigeria
- Website: Official website

Hezekiah University is an approved private university in Nigeria by federal government authority. It is located in Umudi, Nkwerre Imo State Nigeria.

Hezekiah University was established as a private university in May 2015 under the license of the Federal Government of Nigeria.

Hezekiah University is one of the private universities in Nigeria that offers diverse undergraduate programmes.

Hezekiah University has been officially accredited and recognized by the National Universities Commission (NUC), Nigeria.

== Faculties and courses ==
Faculty of Natural and Applied Sciences

- Plant Science and Biotechnology
- Microbiology
- Biochemistry
- Industrial Chemistry
- Computer Science
- Mathematics & Statistics
- Physics with Electronics
- Physics

Faculty of Humanities

- English Language and Literacy Studies
- History and International Studies
- Christian Religious Studies

Faculty of Management and Social Sciences

- Accounting
- Business Administration
- Economics
- Political Science
- Sociology
- Public Administration
- Marketing
- Mass Communication
