= Anglican Diocese of Mbaise =

Anglican diocese in Nigeria

The Anglican Diocese of Mbaise is one of 12 within the Anglican Province of Owerri, itself one of 14 ecclesiastical provinces within the Church of Nigeria. The diocese was inaugurated on 30 November 1992, the inaugural bishop being Cyril Chukwuka Anyanwu who died in 1999, and was succeeded by Bright Joseph Egemasi Ogu. The current bishop is the Right Rev. Chamberlain Chinedu Ogunedo, who was consecrated Bishop on 21 February 2010.

Bishop	Years
Cyril Chukwuka Anyanwu	1992–1999
Bright Joseph Egemasi Ogu	1999–2010
Chamberlain Chinedu Ogunedo	2010–
