= Geoffrey Chukwunenye =

Anglican bishop in Nigeria

Geoffrey Chukwunenye is an Anglican bishop in Nigeria.

Chukwunenye was consecrated the inaugural Bishop of Oru on 16 July 2008 at the Cathedral Church of Emmanuel, Mgbidi.
