= Evelyn Okere =

Nigerian businesswoman

Evelyn Okere is a Nigerian businesswoman. She publishes a health and fashion magazine, St. Eve; is managing director of a health business, St. Eve Concepts; and has a fashion company, Rose di Omimi.

== Early life ==
Okere attended University of Nigeria Nsukka, Enugu State, where she studied history.

== Business career ==
Okere worked in banking, in the telecommunications industry and in the oil and gas industry. She started St. Eve in 2010.

In August 2012 her company brought the American rapper Rick Ross to the Summer Jam Fest concert in Lagos.
