= University of Mkar =

Coordinates: 9.08199°N 8.67527°E

- Type: Private
- Established: June 2005
- Vice-Chancellor: prof. Zacharys Anger Gundu
- Location: Mkar, Nigeria
- Campus: Urban
- Website: https://umm.edu.ng/

University of Mkar, Mkar is a private Christian institution established by the Church of Christ in Sudan among the Tiv (NKST). Founded on June 6, 2005.

The current Vice-Chancellor of the university is prof. Zacharys Anger Gundu, he took the mantle of leadership in August, 2021.

== Location ==
University of Mkar is located in Mkar Benue State, Nigeria. It was formerly called Hilltop University. It is a Christian University.

== Departments and Courses in UNIMKAR ==
Sources:

- Accounting
- Banking and Finance
- Biochemistry
- Biology
- Botany
- Business Administration
- Business Management
- Chemistry
- Computer Science
- Economics
- Education and Biology
- Education and Chemistry
- Education and Mathematics
- Education and Physics
- English Language
- Entrepreneurship
- Food Science and Technology
- Home Science, Nutrition and Dietetics
- Industrial Chemistry
- Industrial Physics
- International Relations
- Mass Communication
- Mathematics
- Microbiology
- Philosophy
- Physics
- Political Science
- Psychology
- Public Administration
- Religious Studies
- Sociology
- Statistics
- Zoology

== Visiting Professor ==
Austin Nosike

== See also ==
- Academic libraries in Nigeria
