= Kingsley Ozumba Mbadiwe University =

Public university in Imo State, Nigeria

- Former name: Eastern Palm University [2016 – 2021]
- Motto: Selfless Service to Humanity
- Type: Public
- Established: 18 February 2016; 10 years ago
- Affiliations: NUC
- Visitor: Senator Hope Uzodinma
- Vice-Chancellor: Professor Ikechukwu Dozie
- Undergraduates: 1500
- Location: Ogboko, Ideato South , Imo State, Nigeria; 5.828°N 7.082°E
- Campus: Sub-urban
- Colors: Black; Blue; Golden
- Website: komu.edu.ng

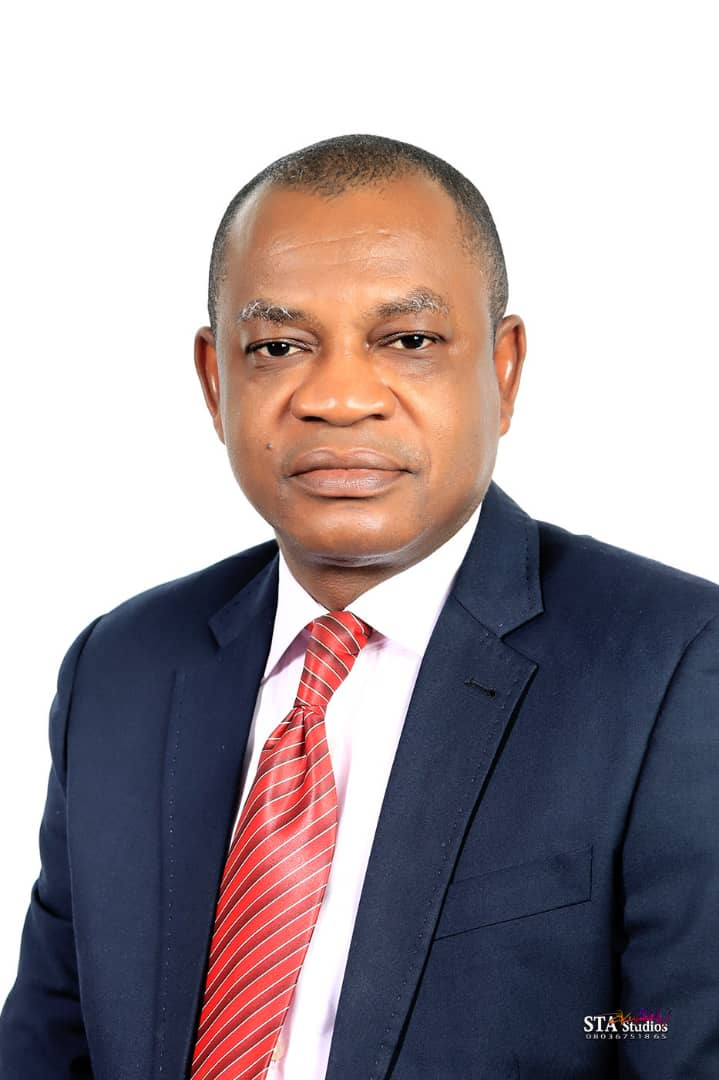
Vice Chancellor, Prof Ikechukwu N. S. Dozie

The Kingsley Ozumba Mbadiwe University (listern) is a tertiary institution at Ogboko in Ideato South Local Government Area of Imo State, Nigeria.

The Kingsley Ozumba Mbadiwe University (KOMU) (formerly Eastern Palm University) is a public university in Ogboko, Ideato, Imo State, Nigeria. The university was established to fulfill the growing demand for quality higher education in Nigeria.

== History ==
The K. O. Mbadiwe Mbadiwe University was established in 2016 as Eastern Palm University and recognized by the National Universities Commission (NUC) as the 42nd State University and the 143rd in the Nigerian University System. Despite being registered as a public university, it was operated under Eastern Palm University as a public-private-partnership institution.

On the 19th of February 2021, the Governor of Imo State and Visitor of the institution, His Excellency, Senator Hope Uzodimma CON re-established its original status as a public university through assent to the Imo State of Nigeria Law No. 1 of 2021 and renamed it Kingsley Ozumba (K.O.) Mbadiwe University after Dr. Kingsley Ozuomba Mbadiwe, who was a politician, nationalist and government minister in the Nigerian First Republic.

The certificate of ownership of the university was presented to the governor of Imo State in 2021 by the Executive Secretary of National University Commission (NUC), Prof. Abubakar Adamu Rasheed.

== Administration and leadership ==
The current principal members of the university administration and their positions are as follows:

Office	holders
Visitor	Governor of Imo State Senator Hope Uzodinma
Vice-Chancellor	Professor Ikechukwu Dozie
Deputy Vice-Chancellor	Professor Aloysius Chijioke Onyeka
Registrar	Dr. Pamela N. Ogamba
Bursar	Dr. Wilson Agbarakwe
University Librarian	Dr. Ngozi M. Nwaohiri

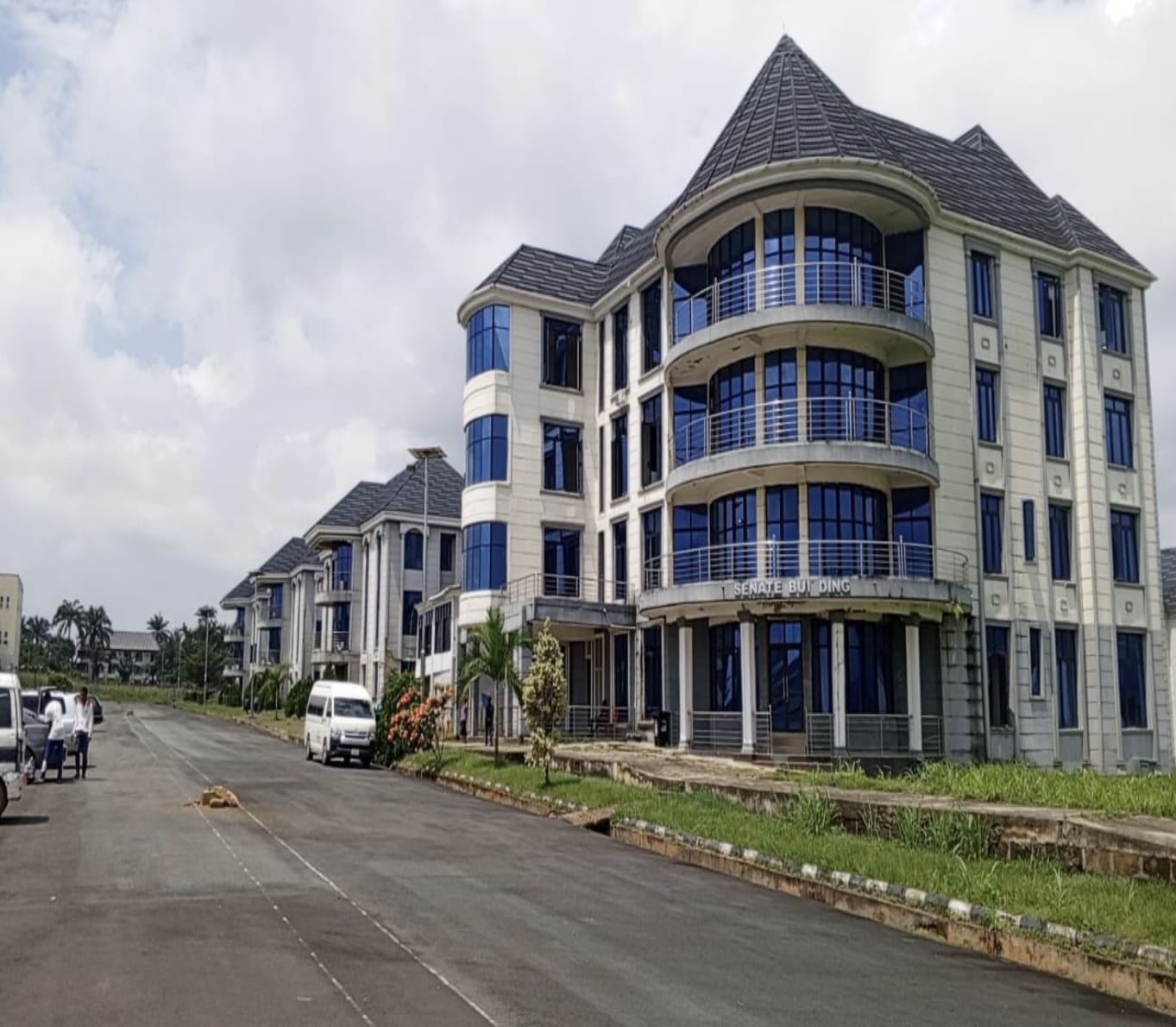
Senate Building and Administrative Block
