= Caleb Maduoma =

Anglican bishop of Nigeria (1950–2021)

Caleb Anny Maduoma (22 September 1950 – 29 April 2021) was an Anglican bishop in Nigeria.

Maduoma was the Bishop of Ideato and archbishop of the Province of Owerri until his retirement in late 2020.

He was consecrated as Bishop of Ideato on 25 July 2004 at the Cathedral Church of the Advent, Abuja, having previously been Bishop of Okigwe South.

He became Archbishop of Owerri Province on 19 January 2013, until his death on 29 April 2021.
