= Ideato South =

Local Government Area in Imo State, Nigeria

- LGA
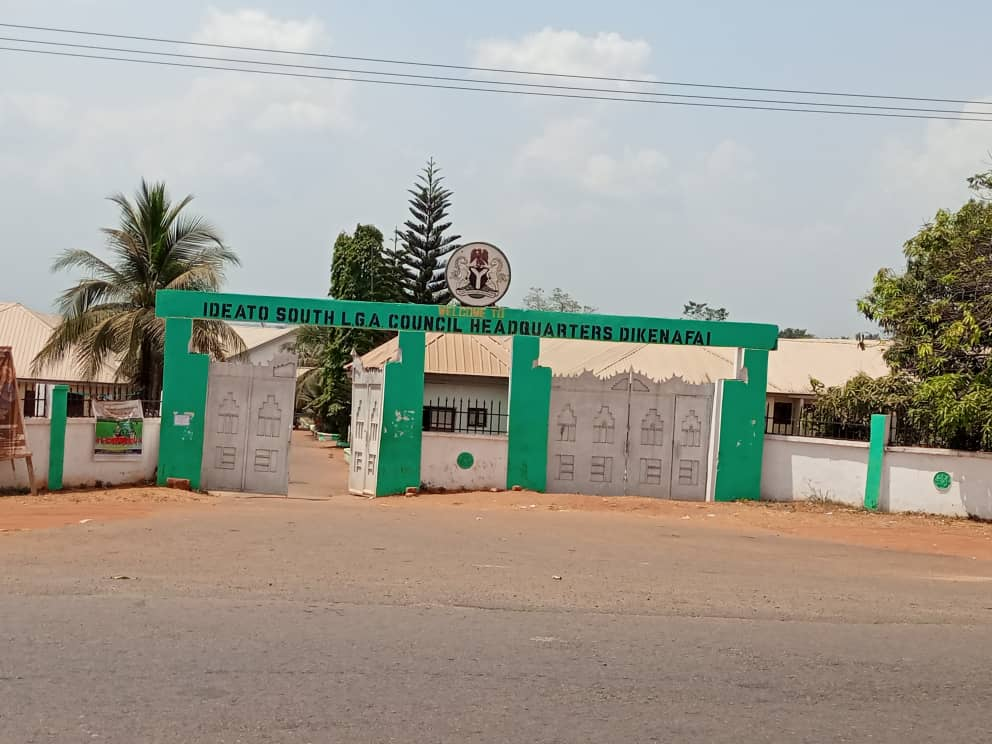
- Ideato South Headquarters Entrance
- Interactive map of Ideato South
- Location in Nigeria
- Coordinates: 5°51′N 7°6′E
- Country: Nigeria
- State: Imo State
- Headquarter: Dikenafai

Government
  - Local Government Chairman: Okechukwu Okwara

Area
  - Total: 88 km^{2} (34 sq mi)

Population (2006 census)
  - Total: 159,879
- Time zone: UTC+1 (WAT)
- 3-digit postal code prefix: 475

Ideato South// is a Local Government Area in Imo State, South-eastern Nigeria. Ideato South, with a total of 23 autonomous communities has its headquarters in the town of Dikenafai, the source of Orashi River. Ideato South has an area of 88 km^{2} (34 sq mi) and a population of 159,879 at the 2006 census. The postal code of the area is 475.

The people of Ideato South are farmers, who produce both cash and food crops. These cash crops include oil palm, raffia palm, groundnut, melon, cotton, cocoa, rubber while the food crops are yams, cassava, cocoyam, breadfruit, three leaf yam etc. They are also traders.

The custodians of their culture, namely the Ezes, Nzes, Ozo title holders, Durunzes etc perform specific roles in relation to their culture. A private University, formally erected by the 5th governor of Imo State, Rochas Okorocha, named Eastern Palm University, has recently been renamed as K. O. Mbadiwe University, making it the second state University after Imo State University. The University is situated in Ogboko, Ideato South. The indigenes and residents of Ideato South are predominantly Catholics and Anglicans.

== Autonomous Community ==
There are twenty-three (23) autonomous communities in Ideato-South LGA. These are Nchoke, Nneato Ogwugwu, Isiekenesi, Dikenafai, Dimagu, Obiohia and Umuaghobe autonomous communities. Others include Awalla, Umuakam, Umuago, Umuobom Umuezedike Duruahurunwa, Umucheke, Umumaisiaku, Amanator, Umueshi, Ntueke, Obiohia, Umuchima, Ugbelle (or Ugbelleaka), Umulewe and Ogwume, Umuezealla-Ogboko and Ogboko autonomous community.

== Water ==
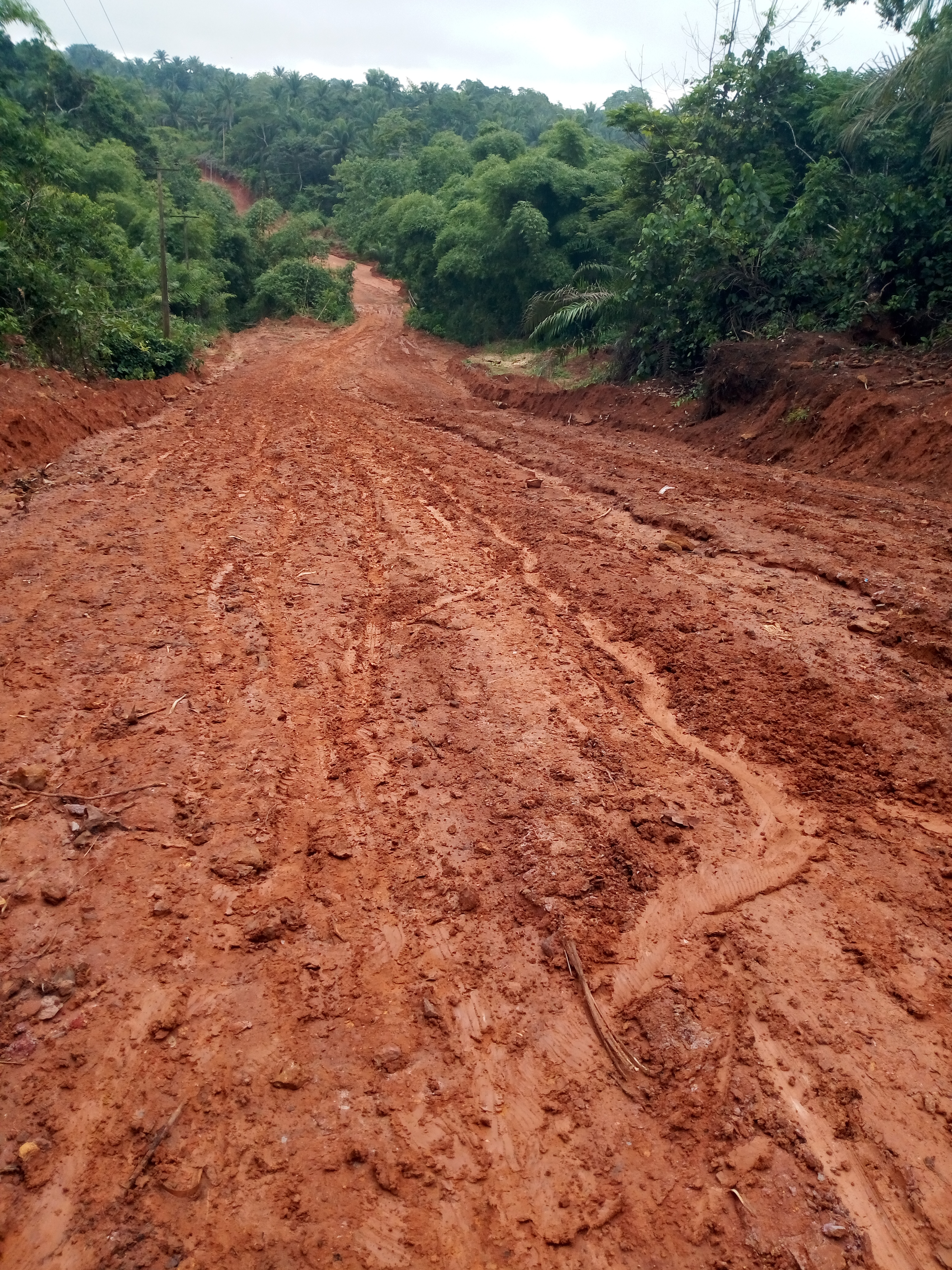
Muddy road during rainy season in Umucheke.

Orashi River takes off from Ezeama community in Dikenafai. Described as a lifeline to Ideato South communities, Orashi stream serves as an all purpose river for drinking, washing and many other purposes, to communities such as Umulewe, Umuezealla-Ogboko, Umuchima and Ntueke.

== Erosion ==
Ideato South, like many other areas of Orlu senatorial zone, has faced erosion problems such as Umueshi, Umuezealla-Ogboko gully erosion site. An intervention programme was kicked off. Umueshi Gully Erosion intervention site, has Amanato and Ntueke as neighbouring (watershed contributor) communities. Whilst appealing for support in September 2000, the chairman of the Local Government area, Chief Ethelbert Okwaranya, said there were 26 erosion sites which had claimed many lives and rendered thousands of people homeless. Other communities in the area suffering this problem includes Umuojisi.

== Agriculture and Forestry ==
The Ideato-South depends mainly on agriculture and commerce. The main occupation of the people are farming and trading. Most of their cash crops are taken to the market, depending on the market that falls when they intend to sell their farm produce (Eke, Orie, Afo and Nkwo). Their cash crops include oil palm, raffia palm, groundnut, melon, cotton, cocoa, rubber, maize, etc. Food crops such as yam, cassava; cocoyam, breadfruit, and three-leaf yam are also produced in large quantities. The location of this L.G.A within the tropical rainforest gives it the ecological basis for production of a wide range of tropical agriculture crops with widespread potentialities for industrial convention.

Greater than the past decades the population density has led to intensified strain on land, forests and other natural resources, leading to escalating pastoral scarcity which is an attribute of thickly inhabited pastoral areas. Crop-free period seldom exceeds one year and in some areas constant cropping is the regulation. Little crop yield and pasting of land to erosion have pooled to tempt people to travel in search of jobs in other parts of the country.

Seeing that as an approach for enhancing agricultural development, private depositors are invited to take part in direct agricultural production, by investing in the planting and cultivation of agricultural crops such as maize, rice, legumes, roots and tubers.

== Costume ==
They are also known for their well-dressed traditional wear, like many other communities and cities across Igboland. The traditional attire for the men is an overflowing jumper, or a long-sleeved shirt worn over the george wrapper, which is tied around the waist, curving down to the ankles. This dress is matched with a cap and a walking stick, which aids as an instrument of support and defense. The traditional wear for the women is a blouse, worn over a loin cloth. This female attire goes with a head-tie, ear rings and necklaces or traditional necklaces. Arts and Craft: traditional artist thrive in this municipal rural communities. Works of art produced in the area comprises, carved doors, walking sticks of different designs, sculptures, flutes, wooden mortars and pestles, gongs, and the famous talking drums. Metal works and various types of productions are locally fashioned.

== Culture ==
Part of the culture of the people of Ideato South is kindness to visitors, which begins with the offering of the kolanuts to the visitor. The kolanut is indicating that the visitor is very much welcomed. The ritual of the offering of kolanut is inspired with the giving in prayers and blessings, or lobby to the supreme God and other deities, for the protection of the visitor and the host. This seems to be a custom to the people of this LGA in any traditional ceremony the presentation of African salad (Abacha). The Okonko festival of Umuezealla-Ogboko is very rich and unique. There are also several social titles which feature outstandingly throughout Ideato-South. The chieftaincy titles are very common and highly regarded. They include: Eze (king), Okenze, Nze, Ozo, Ichie, Durunze etc. Worthy of note is the fact that marriages in Ideato as well as other parts of Igboland can never be held on an Eke market day. Typically, traditional marriages can not start in the morning but in the afternoon.

== Beliefs ==
There is freedom of worship in Imo State, and Nigeria as a whole. Religion occupies a central place in the heart of the people. The people are mostly Christians of different denominations. They are predominantly Catholics and Anglicans. Catholic churches in Ideato South include: St. Micheals, Urualla, St. Josephs, Ntueke amongst others.

Ideato-South is becoming the intellectual and political Mecca of Igboland, and indeed Nigeria. Due to the fact that most of their sons and daughters have become engineers, doctors, administrators, barristers, accountants, information technologists etc. Many are based in Europe, North America, South America, Asia, Australia and other parts of the world, in search of knowledge and wealth.

== Education Institutions in the Area ==
The Ideato South, home to Eastern Palm University, Ogboko, Imo State. The institution was established in 2016 by the Nigeria University Commission as a State owned University. Lately, the Imo state government has renamed the university to K.O.Mbadiwe university.
