= Anglican Diocese of Okigwe South =

Anglican diocese in Nigeria

The Anglican Diocese of Okigwe South is one of twelve dioceses within the Anglican Province of Owerri, itself one of fourteen ecclesiastical provinces within the Church of Nigeria.

It was inaugurated on January 8, 1994, out of the Diocese of Okigwe-Orlu as the 44th Diocese of the country. The Bishop was Bennett Okoro. The Diocese started with 10 priests, eight parishes, 48 church stations and five archdeaconries: there are now nine Archdeaconries Caleb Maduoma became its second Bishop in 2004. The current bishop is David Onuoha, who in July 2020 was elected Archbishop of Owerri. The Diocese on creation had one mission school; it now has 6.
