= F106 highway (Nigeria) =

Highway in Nigeria

F106

Location
- Country: Nigeria

Highway system
- Transport in Nigeria

F106 is an east–west highway in Nigeria, starting in Owerri, Imo State, and passing through Nguru before ending at Etiti on Trunk Road A3.
