= David Onuoha =

Anglican bishop in Nigeria

David Onuoha is an Anglican bishop in Nigeria.

Onuoha is the current Bishop of Okigwe South and was elected Archbishop of the Province of Owerri in 2020.

He was enthroned as Bishop of Okigwe South in 2004.
