= Tanko Zubairu =

Former military administrator of Imo State

Administrator of Imo State
- In office 22 Aug 1996 – 29 May 1999
- Preceded by: James N.J. Aneke
- Succeeded by: Achike Udenwa

Colonel Tanko Zubairu was the Military Administrator of Imo State, Nigeria from August 1996 until May 1999, when he handed over to the elected civilian governor Achike Udenwa. During his tenure, he had to deal with violent protests over ritual killings. In 1997 he signed warrants for execution by firing squad of six men accused of this crime. Bob Njemanze, a member of the Njemanze ruling dynasty in Owerri, Imo State, described Zubairu's tenure as that of "a soldier in a hurry to nowhere and getting to nowhere".

He was said to have supported the All Nigeria People's Party (ANPP) in the April 1999 Imo State governorship elections, but in the event the People's Democratic Party (PDP) won the election. After the hand-over, the Imo House of Assembly summoned him to give an account of his stewardship of the state. He refused on the grounds that as a military administrator he was not required to give an account to civilians. The matter dragged through the courts until 2007, when the Supreme Court said he should give evidence if requested.

In September 2008 he was chairman of the National Sourcing In-Coverage Global Technocom Ltd (NSICGT), a private initiative that was issuing educational scholarships especially for Nigerian youths.
