= Achike Udenwa =

Nigerian politician

3rd Governor of Imo State
- In office 29 May 1999 – 29 May 2007
- Preceded by: Tanko Zubairu
- Succeeded by: Ikedi Ohakim

Minister of Commerce and Industry
- In office 17 December 2008 – 17 March 2010
- Preceded by: Charles Ugwuh
- Succeeded by: Jubril Martins-Kuye

Personal details
- Born: 1948 (age 77–78)
- Party: People's Democratic Party (PDP)

Achike Udenwa // (born in 1948) is a Nigerian politician who was governor of Imo State from 29 May 1999 to 29 May 2007. He is a member of the People's Democratic Party. He was succeeded by Chief Ikedi Ohakim on 29 May 2007.

In December 2008, President Umaru Yar'Adua appointed him Minister of Commerce and Industry. He left office in March 2010 when Acting President Goodluck Jonathan dissolved his cabinet.
