= Ihitte-Uboma =

Local Government Area in Imo State, Nigeria

- Town and LGA
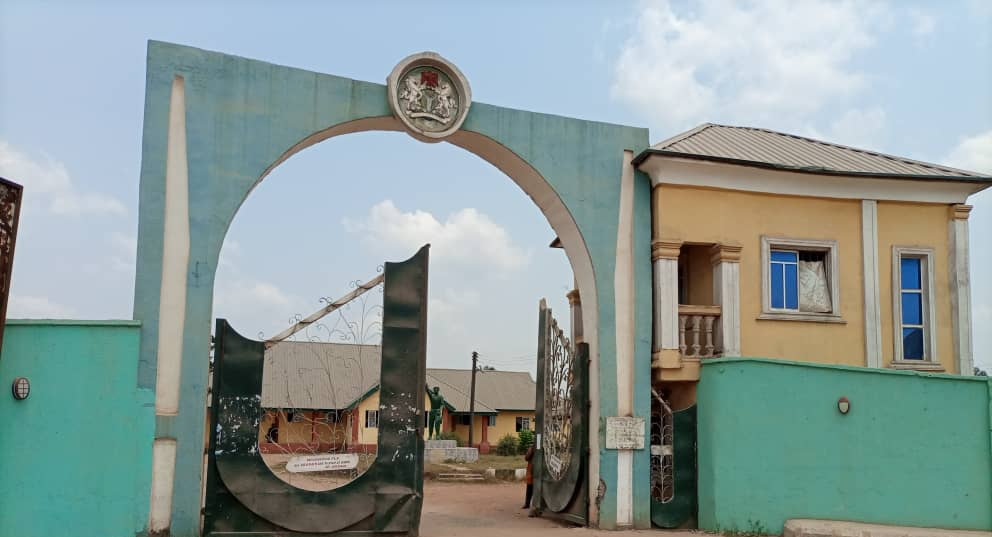
- Ihitte Uboma headquarters entrance
- Interactive map of Ihitte-Uboma
- Coordinates: 5°36′54″N 7°20′58″E
- Country: Nigeria
- State: Imo State

Government
  - Local Government Chairman: Obioha Ndukwe

Area
  - Total: 104 km^{2} (40 sq mi)

Population (2006)
  - Total: 120,744
  - Density: 1,160/km^{2} (3,010/sq mi)
- Time zone: UTC+1 (WAT)
- Postal code: 472

Ihitte-Uboma is a town and local government area of Imo State, Nigeria.

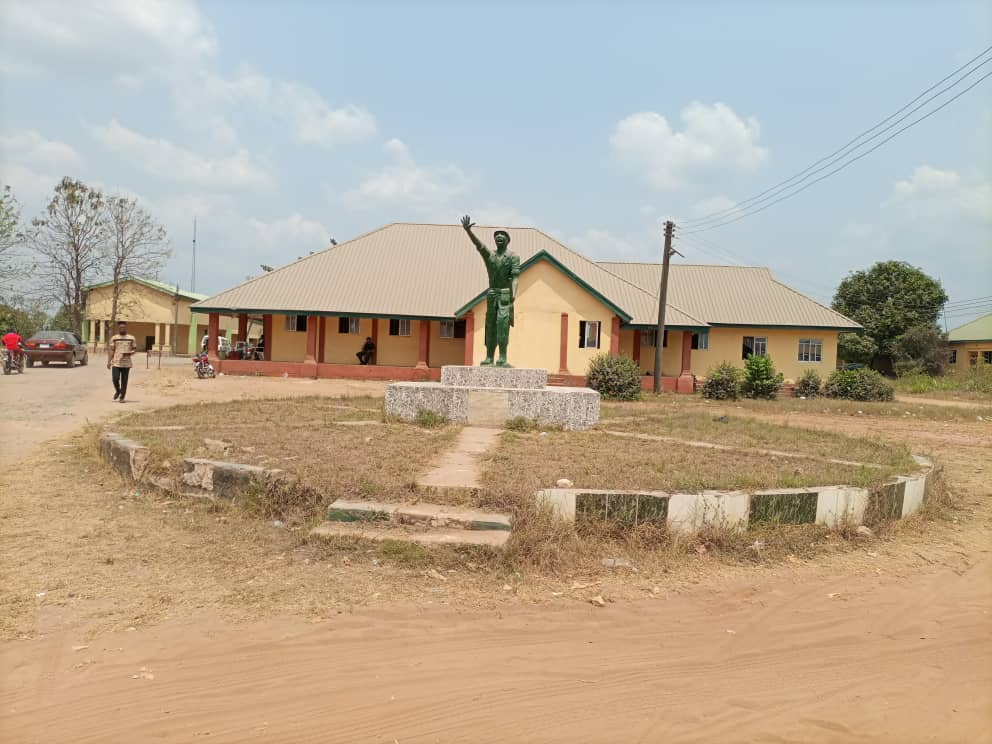
Ihitte Uboma headquarters building

It has an area of 104 km^{2}. Its population was 120,744 at the 2006 census.

The postal code of the area is 472.

One of the communities in Ihitte-Uboma is Ezimba.
