= James Hope University, Lagos =

Private university in Nigeria

- JHU
- Motto: Magnitudine suæ spę et educatione
- Motto in English: Hope and Education for Greatness
- Type: Private
- Established: 2021
- Founders: Jim Ovia
- Accreditation: National Universities Commission
- Chancellor: Jim Ovia
- Vice-Chancellor: Prof Oluyele Akinkugbe
- Location: Lagos, Nigeria

James Hope University (JHU), Lekki, Lagos, is a private university in Nigeria approved by Nigeria's Federal Executive Council (FEC) in February 2021, along with other 19 universities.

== History ==
The university was founded by Nigerian businessman and banker Jim Ovia. Popularly known as JHU, the university is located in Lekki, Ibeju-Lekki Local Government Area of Lagos State, Southwest Nigeria.

== Organisation and governance ==
=== Chancellor ===
Jim Ovia is the founder and chancellor of James Hope University, Lagos.

=== Vice-Chancellor ===
Since 16 February 2026, the Vice-Chancellor has been Prof. Oluyele Akinkugbe. Akinkugbe succeeds Prof. Austin Nosike. Nosike took over from Prof. Abiola Babajide, the Acting VC.

== Courses ==
The university runs only postgraduate courses in Master of Science (MSc) and Master of Business Administration (MBA). The programmes offered are Economic Development and Policy Analysis, Finance, Fintech and Analytics, and Innovation, Intrapreneurship and Entrepreneurship.
