= Ohaji/Egbema =

Local Government Area in Imo State, Nigeria

- LGA
- Interactive map of Ohaji/Egbema
- Country: Nigeria
- State: Imo State
- Capital: Mmahu-Egbema

Government
  - Local Government Chairman: Marcellinus Amadioha
- Time zone: UTC+1 (WAT)
- Postal code: 464
- National language: Igbo

Ohaji/Egbema is an oil-rich Local Government Area of Imo State, Nigeria. It is headquartered in Mmahu-Egbema. Ohaji-Egbema Local Government Area as presently constituted was created by Gen. Ibrahim Babangida's administration in the August 27, 1991 presidential proclamation, created out of the former Ohaji/Egbema/Oguta L.G.A . Ohaji/Egbema comprises three political districts: Ohaji East, Egbema North, and Ohaji West. The Ohaji-Egbema local government has seventeen autonomous communities, namely Egbema, Umuagwo, Oloshi, Umunkwaku, Obile, Obitti, Mgbirichi/Alakuru, Opuoma, Assa, Awarra, Ikwerede, Umuokanne, Obiakpu, Ohaba, Obosima, Mmahu, and Obuomadike.

The postal code of the area is 464.

== Location ==
The local council lies in the south-western part of Imo State. It shares common boundaries with Owerri in the East, Oguta LGA in the North and Ogba/Egbema/Ndoni in Rivers State in the South-west.

== Egbema Power Station ==
A Power Plant project was initiated at Mmahu Egbema in 2006 under President Olusegun Obasanjo to ameliorate the sufferings of many Imo State communities. To ensure resumption of work at the power project abandoned for more than five years, the administration of Rochas Okorocha who showed displeasure at the state of the project visited the site in June 2015. The governor's visit was to mobilise the contractors handling the project back to site as well as ensure speedy completion of the project within ten months.

The power plant, planned for an installed capacity of 380.7 MW (510,500 hp) (ISO) and 338 MW (453,000 hp) (Net), when completed would act as an enabler for industrialization and creation of jobs in Imo State.
