= Umuagwo =

Town in Imo State, Nigeria

Coordinates: 5°18′21″N 6°56′44″E

Umuagwo is a town in the Ohaji/Egbema Local Government Area (LGA) of Imo State in Nigeria. The population is mostly Christian and Igbo-speaking. The town lies on the Otamiri River downstream from Ihiagwa and 26 km (16 mi) from Owerri on the Port Harcourt road. Eze Tony Oguzie, Chairman of the Council of Traditional Rulers in the Orlu (Imo West) senatorial zone, is monarch of Umuagwo.

== Health ==
The town has a busy market which does not have any toilet or sanitary conveniences and is therefore insanitary, with high risk of contamination of the foodstuffs that are sold. In a 2006 study of the prevalence of Urinary schistosomiasis, a chronic parasitic disease caused by the trematode worm Schistosoma haematobium, Umuagwo was the only town in the LGA that had no cases of infection.

== Education ==
The Michael Okpara College of Agriculture was established near the town in 1978, and was upgraded to become the Iwo State Polytechnic, Umuagwo in 2007. It is accredited at the State level. Chinwe Obaji was a lecturer at this institution before being appointed head of the Nigerian Federal Ministry of Education.
