= Eziama =

Eziama may refer to one of several populated places in Nigeria:

Link	Coordinates	UFI	UNI
Eziama Urata at GEOnet Names Server	5°21′0″N 7°20′0″E	-2006910 at GEOnet Names Server	-2793266
Ezi Amata at GEOnet Names Server	5°20′0″N 7°30′0″E	-2006909 at GEOnet Names Server	-2793265
Eziama Owa at GEOnet Names Server	6°22′0″N 7°10′0″E	-2006908 at GEOnet Names Server	-2793264
Eziama-Awwa at GEOnet Names Server	6°22′0″N 7°10′0″E	-2006908 at GEOnet Names Server	-2793262
Eziama Olo at GEOnet Names Server	6°24′0″N 7°12′0″E	-2006907 at GEOnet Names Server	-2793263
Eziama at GEOnet Names Server	6°23′0″N 7°15′0″E	-2006906 at GEOnet Names Server	-2793261
Eziama at GEOnet Names Server	5°57′0″N 7°18′0″E	-2006905 at GEOnet Names Server	-2793260
Eziama at GEOnet Names Server	5°45′0″N 7°5′0″E	-2006904 at GEOnet Names Server	-2793259
Eziama at GEOnet Names Server	5°33′0″N 7°9′0″E	-2006903 at GEOnet Names Server	-2793258
Eziama at GEOnet Names Server	5°26′0″N 7°50′0″E	-2006902 at GEOnet Names Server	-2793257
Eziama at GEOnet Names Server	5°26′0″N 7°22′0″E	-2006901 at GEOnet Names Server	-2793256
Eziama at GEOnet Names Server	5°18′0″N 7°14′0″E	-2006900 at GEOnet Names Server	-2793255

NOTE: GEOnet and GEOnetdab UFI links currently "broken" (NGA change?); GEOnet2 G_NAME/Name_GUID links currently work.

== See also ==
- Eziama, Imo, Nigeria (a town)
