= Anglican Diocese of Orlu =

Anglican diocese in Nigeria

The Anglican Diocese of Orlu is one of 12 within the Anglican Province of Owerri, itself one of 14 ecclesiastical provinces within the Church of Nigeria. The current bishop is the Right Rev. Benjamin Chinedum Okeke.
