= Chamberlain Chinedu Ogunedo =

Anglican bishop of Nigeria

Chamberlain Chinedu Ogunedo is an Anglican bishop in Nigeria.

He was ordained a deacon in 1998 and a priest in 1999. He became a Canon in 2002; and an archdeacon in 2008. He has also been chaplain to the Bishop of Aba.

Ogunedo became Bishop of Mbaise on 28 February 2010.
