= Abba, Imo State =

Town in Anambra State, Nigeria

Coordinates: 6.216969°N 6.978989°E

Abba is a town in Njikoka Local Government Area (LGA) in Anambra State, Nigeria.

Abba consists of four communities. Listed in order of seniority they are Ire, Amabo, Okpuloji, and Ezi-Abba; the four communities encompass twenty-eight villages.

== History of Abba ==
Etymologically, the word Abba means father, which in common usage is called "Abba Nna".

The first traditional ruler of Abba was Eze Madukwem Emmanuel Unaka (Uburu 1 of Abba), succeeded by Eze Ndubueze Maduabuchukwu (Uburu II of Abba).

Historically, Abba in Nwangele LGA and Abam in Bende LGA of Abia State originated from the same place. Centuries ago, Field Marshal Ochiagha Uburu left Bende and fought through several towns in a move to demonstrate his military prowess and extract respectability. Uburu finally decided to stay and establish himself in a rocky grove that was known as Ebu-Ogbugha Nkume (rock of ages) and is the location of the present day Abba.
