= Anglican Diocese of Owerri =

Anglican diocese in Nigeria

The Anglican Diocese of Owerri is one of 12 within the Anglican Province of Owerri, itself one of 14 ecclesiastical provinces within the Church of Nigeria. The current bishop is the Right Rev. Chukwuma Oparah.
