= Imo State Polytechnic =

- Type: Polytechnic
- Established: 1978
- Rector: Prof Chukwuka Kanayo Stephen
- Location: Omuma, Imo State, Nigeria
- Website: www.imopoly.edu.ng

Imo State Polytechnic is a higher educational institution in Omuma, Imo State, Nigeria. It was established in 1978 as the Michael Okpara College of Agriculture, Umuagwo and was upgraded to a Polytechnic status, renamed as the Imo State Polytechnic, Umuagwo in 2007. The institution provides courses, training and research in all branches of Agriculture, Management Sciences, Engineering and Food Sciences. The institution is certified to award National Diploma and Higher National Diploma qualifications.

The Polytechnic is located in Omuma, Oru East LGA of Imo State after the Governor of the state, Senator Hope Uzodimma, assented to a bill relocating the institution from twenty-six kilometers from Owerri on the Port Harcourt Road.

Chinwe Obaji was a lecturer at this institution before being appointed head of the Nigerian Federal Ministry of Education.

== Schools in the Institution ==
Here are the five schools within Imo State Polytechnic and their department total in brackets.

- School of Sciences (5)
- School of Business (7)
- School of Agriculture (9)
- School of Engineering (4)
- School of Environmental Design and Management Technology (3)

== See also ==
- List of polytechnics in Nigeria
