= Nkwerre =

Nkwerre Nkwerre Ọkwara Eshi
- Town and LGA
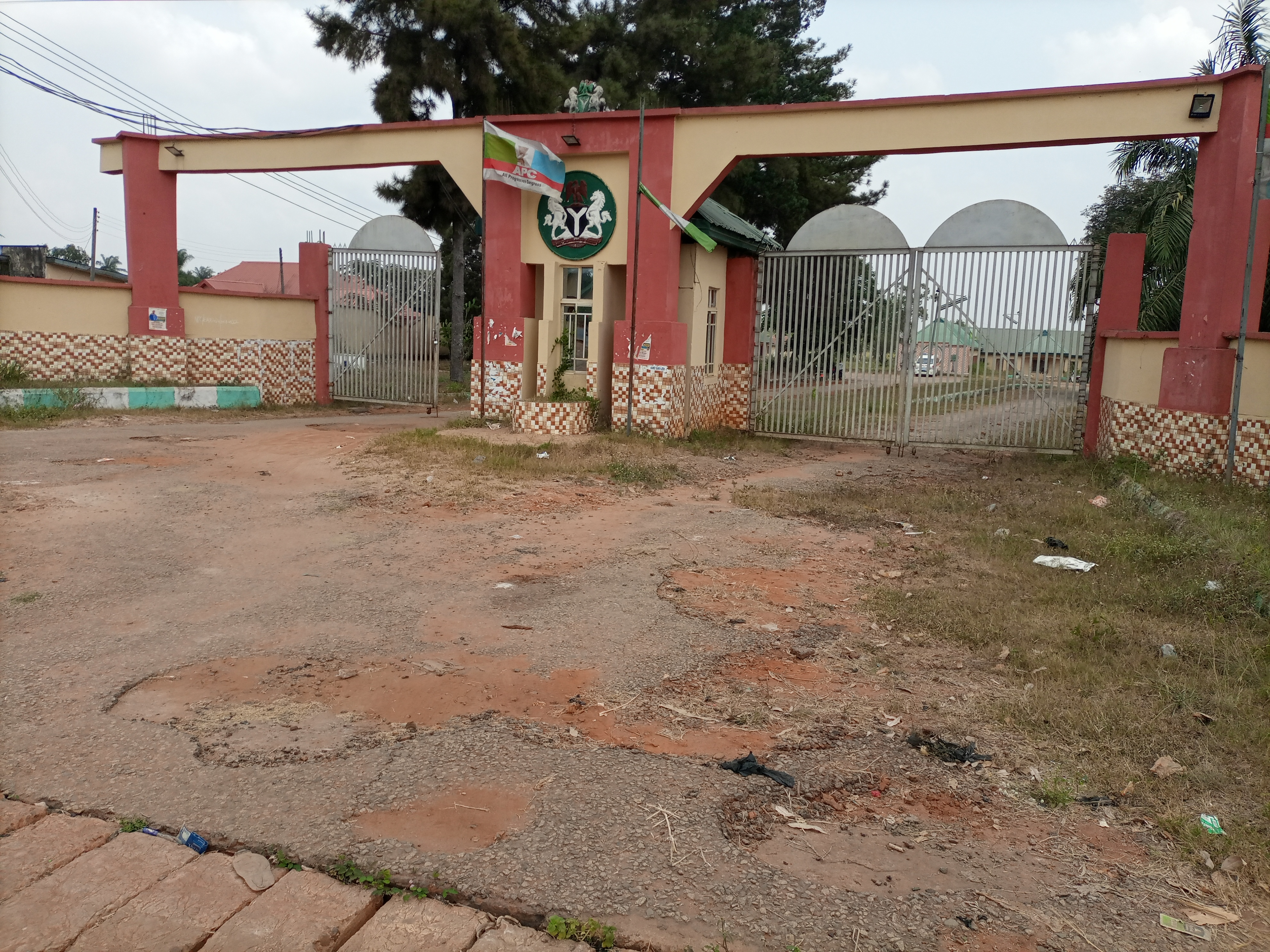
- Nkwerre Headquarters Entrance
- Nickname: Nkwerre Opiaegbe (the Gun-makers)
- Interactive map of Nkwerre
- Location in Nigeria
- Coordinates: 5°45′0″N 7°06′0″E
- Country: Nigeria
- State: Imo State

Government
  - Local Government Chairman: Emmanuel Chiedozie Chukunyere

Area
  - Total: 38.447 km^{2} (14.844 sq mi)

Population (2006)
  - Total: 80,270
  - Density: 2,088/km^{2} (5,407/sq mi)
- Time zone: UTC+1 (WAT)
- Postal code: 471

Nkwerre is a town and one of the Local Government Areas in Imo State, South-East, Nigeria. Its population was placed at 80,270 from the 2006 population census with an area of 38.447 km. It is known for its thick vegetation which is supposed to prevent soil erosion however, it is erosion prone area.

The postal code of the local government area is 471. In 2015, Hezekiah University was built in Nkwerre, Ishiala umudi. Nkwerre community that gave the local government area its name was known for its indigenous technology of blacksmithing ingenuity. This endeared the community the name, "Nkwerre Opia Egbe" meaning "Nkwerre, the manufacturer of gun."

== Climate ==
The temperature in the region fluctuates year-round, ranging from 19 °C (66 °F) to 30 °C (86 °F), with occasional dips below 14 °C (58 °F) or above 32 °C (89 °F).

The warming stripes shows the average annual temperature over the greater Nkwerre region as a result of climate change.

== Notable places in Nkwerre ==
- Hezekiah University, Ishiala Umudi.
- Harmony Aguoru Foundation.
- NYSC Temporary Orientation Camp (Formerly Girl's Model Secondary School)
- Stratford Hotel
- Jessica Hotel
- Nkwerre Country Club
- Nkwerre Aborigines Union Building

== Notable Nkwerre natives ==
- Uzor Arukwe, actor
- Destiny Chukunyere, singer
- Ndubisi Chukunyere, football player
- Linda Ikeji, celebrity blogger
