= Agwa =

Town in Oguta LGA of Imo State, Nigeria

Ágwà Ọ̀hà Ágwà
- Town
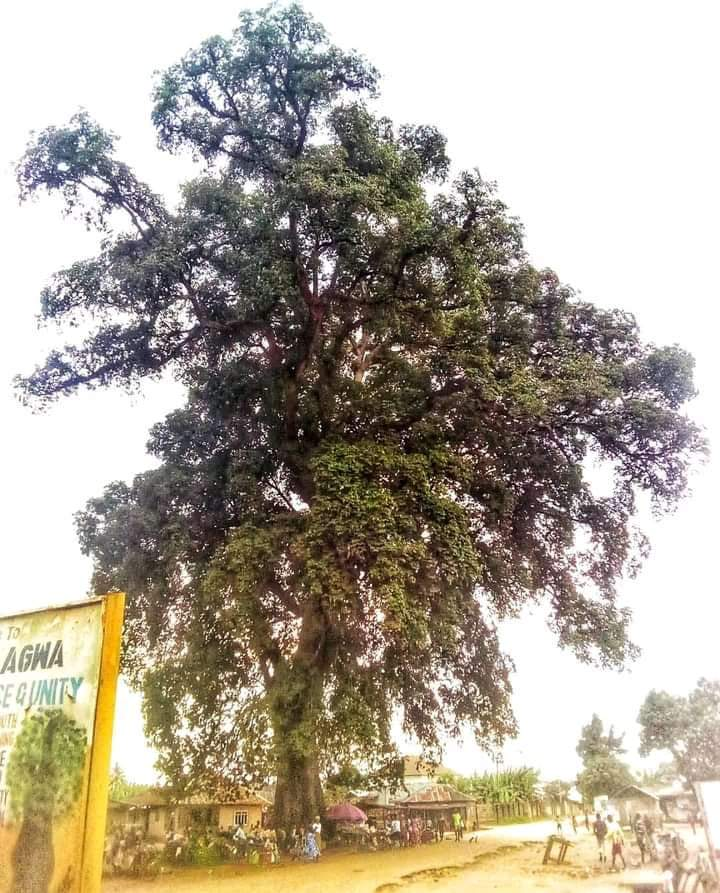
- Giant Uzhi tree at Obudi, Ágwà
- Motto(s): Udo, ịdị n'otu, na Ọganihu
- Location within Nigeria
- Coordinates: 5°33′35″N 6°53′00″E
- Country: Nigeria
- States: Imo State
- LGA: Oguta
- Villages: Obudi; Mgbala; Uba; Umuomi; Obe-ama; Umuekpu; Obeakuma; Umukpo; Umuofeke; Aro quarters

Government
  - Type: Traditional Republicanism, Councillorship
  - Body: Traditional Chiefs of autonomous communities, Elected Ward Councillors

Area
  - Total: 150 km^{2} (58 sq mi)
- Elevation: 55.41–70.86 m (181.8–232.5 ft)

Population
  - Total: 230,000
  - Density: 1,533/km^{2} (3,970/sq mi)
- Demonym(s): Onye Ágwà, Ńdé Agwa, Agwarian
- Time zone: UTC+1 (WAT)
- Postcode: 464111,464112....
- Religion: Christianity, Omenala

Agwa is a village located in the Oguta local government area in Imo State, Nigeria.

Agwa lies 22 kilometres (14 mi) east of Oguta, and 15 kilometres (9.3 mi) west of the Owerri Capital Territory. It lies within the traditional territory of the Southern Igbo people and forms part of the Owerri cultural and linguistic region. Historically referred to as Obudi‑Agwa due to the establishment of a native court at Obudi village during the colonial era, the name later reverted to Agwa in official use.

== Geography ==
The village lies within the tropical rainforest belt of southeastern Nigeria and is part of the lowland Niger Delta plain. The terrain is generally flat with fertile soils conducive to agriculture. It shares its borders with Ogbaku in Mbaitolu to the North, Ejemekwuru and Izombe in Oguta to the West, Amakohia-Ubi and Okuku in Owerri West to the East, and Amafor, Obogwe, and Egbema communities in Ohaji/Egbema to the Southwest and South, all in Imo State.

Although no rivers or stream flow directly to the village, it is positioned within the catchment area of the Orashi and Njaba river systems. Thus, in the past, aside from rainfall, smaller drainage channels and seasonal streams contribute to local water supply and farming activities

== Demography ==
Agwa is considered by some sources as the largest village by population and voting strength in Oguta LGA, having three out of the eleven wards in the LGA. It is also among the largest villages in Imo State by indigenous population. The Agwa people speak a dialect of Igbo, resembling that of the Oratta cluster, although as with many Igbo communities, local speech forms may reflect regional dialectal variation. Detailed linguistic documentation specific to Agwa remains limited in published academic literature.

According to some published descriptions, local neighbours historically viewed Agwa warriors as formidable in inter‑communal conflicts.

Recent census data at the town level are not published independently of wider local government figures; however, the community is described in reports as one of the populated areas within Imo State. Historical population data for the region were collected during the 1963 Nigerian census, reporting the village's population at 29,000 people, though such figures have been subject to debate.

In the heat of the Biafran War in 1969, an American report had estimated the population of the village to be around 75,000.

The community exhibits patterns of rural-urban migration common in southeastern Nigeria, with many residents living in urban centres such as Owerri, Port Harcourt, Lagos, and Abuja while maintaining ties to Agwa.

Religiously, the Agwa people are predominantly Christians, with a substantial Roman Catholic population. Despite the influence of Christianity, a sizable population still adheres to traditional religions, with recent years witnessing a resurgence of interest in the traditional religion.

== History ==
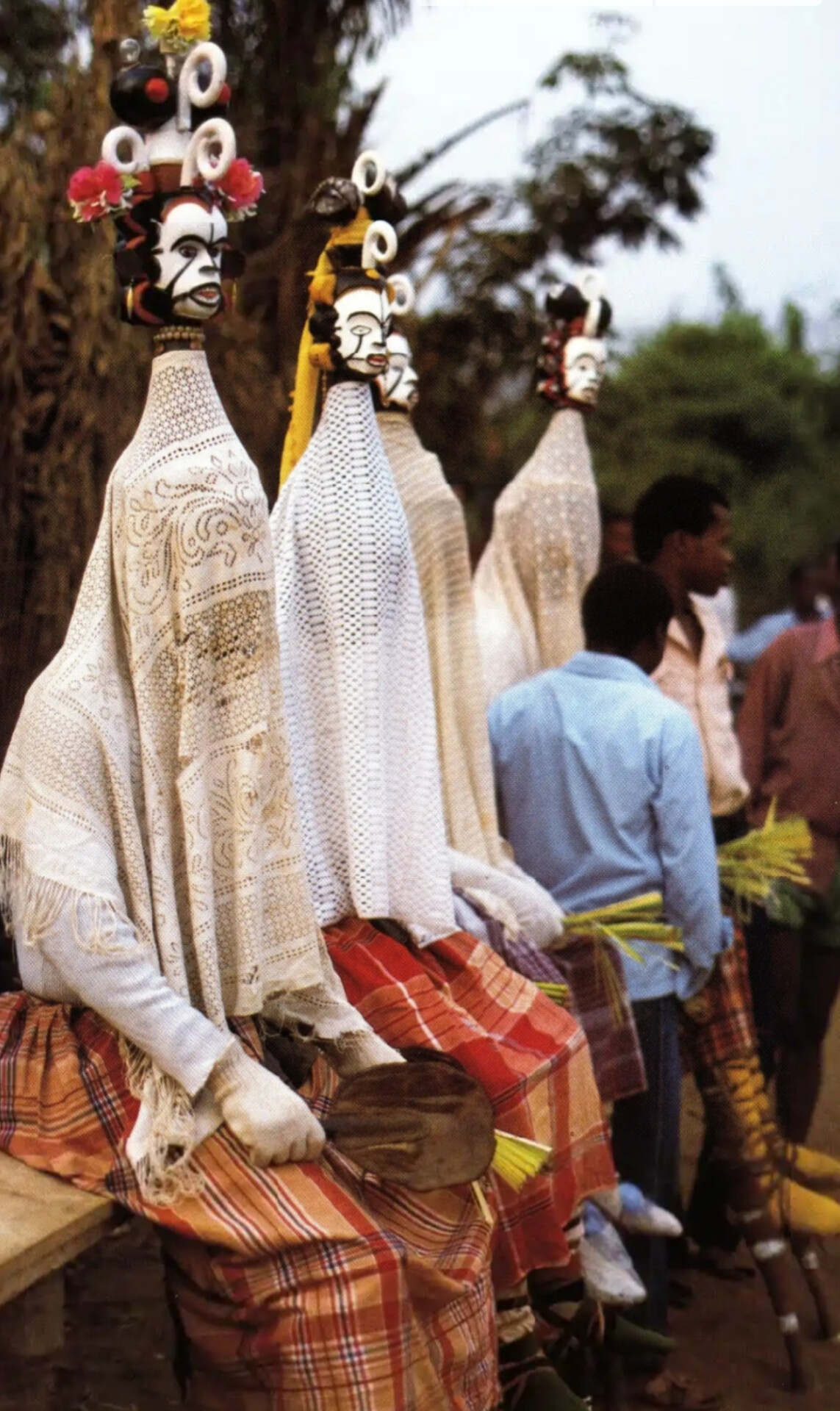
Oghu Masqueraders seated during an Oghu play at Mgbala-Agwa, 1984

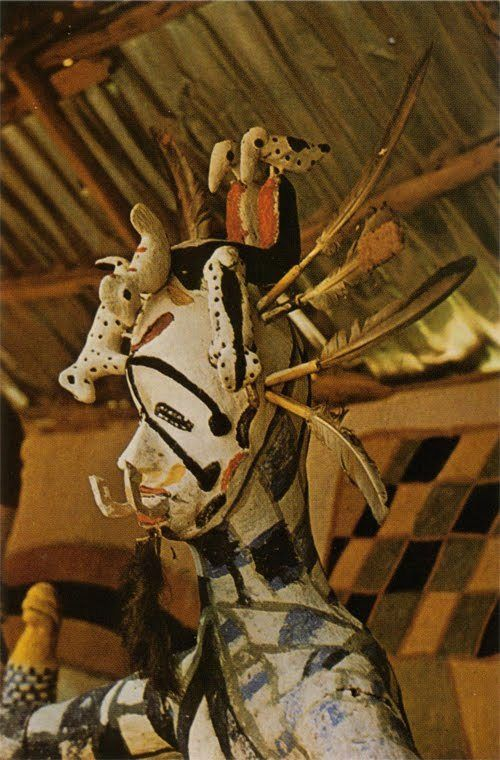
Okoroshi mask head

=== Etymology ===
According to an Igbo dictionary, Agwa means a climbing plant "Agwa". In the Ikwerre dialect, spoken south of Agwa, "Agwa" means "remnants". Lastly, according to an Igbo dictionary, Àgwà also means character. While some local scholars and many of the locals themselves, link the origin of the Agwa village to a migration from Ihiagwa, accounts of Ihiagwa origin according to some sources, connect the meaning of the name "Agwa" to "behaviour".

=== Oral traditions and theories of origin ===
The early history of Agwa is primarily preserved through oral traditions, as is common among many Igbo communities. These traditions describe the development of the community through the gradual aggregation of settlements over time

Anthropological studies of southeastern Nigeria place Agwa within the broader Owerri cultural zone of the Igbo-speaking peoples. Early ethnographic work by Daryll Forde and G. I. Jones describes the social organization and distribution of Igbo groups in the region.

==== The Ihiagwa theory ====
Although some local scholars and many of the locals themselves, agree on the origin of the village from a migration from Ihiagwa and a shared ancestry between the Agwa people and the founders of Ihiagwa and Nekede, available sources present two accounts of origin from Ihiagwa. While one suggests that the village was founded by a single ancestor called Agwa whose nine sons founded the nine original villages of Agwa, the other account names three relatives; Akuma, Ahii and Ezekpu as the ancestral figures, who had established the Agwa village after their migration from Ihiagwa.

The latter account traces the establishment of Obeakuma, Obudi and Umuekpu villages to the ancestral figures, Akuma, Ahii and Ezekpu respectively, while the other villages were established by immigrations from other places, with the Aro quarters in the centre of the village being the last established thus the saying "Ọfọ ntolu jikọ̀tàrà Agwa, Arọ agaa ha iri" (Nine sceptres constituted Agwa, then Aro made them ten).

==== The Autochthonous theory ====
The Autochthonous theory of origin known as Nfunala is supported by some Igbo communities, including a significant number of Agwa people and even some scholars such as Elizabeth Isichei.

According to Igbo historian, Elizabeth Isichei, the inhabitants have always lived in their present location since the earliest times. Interestingly, accounts from scholars on the history of Ihiagwa, of which accounts of origin had traced Àgwà to, support an autochthonous theory of origin of the Ihiagwa village, stating that Chukwu, the creator even lived in Ihiagwa
