= Ibele =

Ibele is an autonomous community located in the Njaba Local Government Area of Imo State, Nigeria. It is situated along the old Douglas road, stretching from Afor-Umuaka westward to Ukworji in Eziama-Obiator, Mbaitoli Local Government Area, and then to Oguta.

Ibele community is bounded to the north by Ugbele-Akah, to the east by Amiyi-Akah, to the west by Amazano and Obeakpu communities, all within Njaba Local Government Area. To the south, it is bounded by Afara and Eziama-Obiator communities in Mbaitoli Local Government Area.

== Origin ==
The Ibele community originated from the amalgamation of like-minded people who migrated from distant and diverse places to co-settle in the present location called Ibele.

History proves that Ibele is a conscious effort of three settlers who migrated into the area by close to four hundred years ago and co-existed as one people. The people or settlers that constitute Ibele community are set as Ndiokwu, Okwudor, Oru and Ndiuhu and this has been the order of seniority from memorable period till date.

History prove that Ndiokwu and Nduihu communities originated from same father called Nze Duruodu who migrated down to the present land from Umuhu-Okabia from Orsu Local Government Area of Imo State. Okwudor community is equally inhabited by settlers that migrated to the land from Okwudor town in Njaba Local Government Area while Oru land is occupied by people or settlers from Orodo in Mbaitoli local government area of same Imo State.

The facts of the real seniority status amongst the constituting communities has posed dangerous threat to the co-existence and well-being of Ibele community in recent days. Legends have it that the first settlers in Ibele town is the Okwudor people, Oru being the second to settle while Duruodu people being Ndiokwu and Ndiuhu were the last settlers in the land.

Those claims did not in any way conform with the seniority status that has long existed. Although, this claim is widespread in the town, but there has never been proper explanation on the dislocation of seniority order that misplaced Okwudor to occupy the second position while Ndiokwu which by provision of the legend expected to be at rear of the order reversed to occupy the foremost position.

The question to the regard of how the seniority status changed had never been properly explained. When and how, the order changed are totally unexplained by present people of the community.

Although the legend has never been disputed by elders in the town, neither has the modern man unveil the reason of the dislocation. The account of messianic existence and operation in Ibele community may unravel the true reason of the disputed seniority status and how all things took a confusing state.

== Origin of the name ==
The name "Ibele" and its meaning has been misunderstood by various account makers of the community or those surrounding it that references it in their works.

Ibele is a name of a vast parcel of land that lies along old Douglas road that run from Afor-Umuaka westward to Ukwuorji in Eziama Obiato in Mbaitoli Local Government Area. The name Ibele was given to the portion of land by early hunters who migrate from Oru axes of present-day Oru East Local Government Area of Imo State. When the hunters from Oru crossed over the Njaba River, they disvirgined the forest that run across the present Umuele, Ibele and Ugbele lands.

Those forests were filled of antelopes as a major animal. And as hunters and fishermen, they began to identify the forests with antelopes. At the mouth or shore of Njaba River, they encounter young or siblings of antelopes and they name the river mouth and its close forest as "Umu-ele" which means "siblings of antelopes".

When the Oru hunters advanced into the forest, they found a herd of antelopes and they named the area as "Ibe-ele" which means "home of antelopes".(Igbo Grammatic Dictionary) At the left flank of the forest, they named it "Ugbe-ele" which means "route of antelopes".

Those names became identical names for those various parts of the forests as they carry out their hunting businesses.

The name Ibele did not take off or grow along the communal activities of the early settlers since all settlers bear along names of their traditional homes.

== Early sojourners ==
When the Oru people disvirgined the forests, they pinned their huts at the present land known as Oru in Ibele community. They identified there by the traditional name of their community (Oru).

The legend had it that they settled at that spot because of the presence of a natural pond that stretched forth the land that is occupied by the people of Umuezala Ugbele that run down along the present boundary areas between settlement of Ibele and Amiyi towards Afara community in Mbaitoli local government area.

The Orus were interested by the presence of the pond and as people that have keen interest for fishing, made enquiries from Chukwu Abiama of Aro-Chukwu on what to be done to transform the pond into a full grown river. They were told by the priest of Chukwu Abiama that for the river to be fully established, they will make sacrifices of two male and one female virgins in order to institute a deity of the river.

The request became ambiguous to the Orus who abandoned the project and concentrated on the hunting as well as fishing along Njaba River. This pond-like river was the source of the name, Amaiyi as the people of that community migrated down to the location.

That pond latter dried up and the Orus did not permanently settle at that land but were occasionally coming there to dry their meats of animals they kill during hunting. The land was later occupied by another people from Orodo in Mbaitoli who retained the name Oru as it has already been popularly identified.

The story of the Oru people’s occupation on Ibele land is easily confirmed because many things happened in the recent period to confirm such.

The story held that as the real settlers of that constituted Ibele community emerged, they were frequently encountering hunters from Oru as they usually do their business there.

The early settlers of Ibele were not comfortable with the attitude of Orus and for sake of permanent control and integrity; they confronted the Oru people who they saw as a threat to the new settlement.

The confrontation boiled down to dialogue in which the Orus swore that they were not interested to invade the community or having intention to commit anything injurious to the new settlers.

They maintained that their main interest is to hunt in the land. Both communities arrived to a peaceful resolution to the conflict that was sealed with an oath that both communities must embrace each other as relatives and must live as brothers till age abiding.

This covenant was followed and maintained by both communities. Legend bear that due to such covenant, the Ibele community saw Orus as their brothers and refused giving their daughters unto them for marriage. They neither marry the daughters of Oru communities equally.

Even at this era, it is quite difficult to see an Oru daughter married at Ibele community. Few years ago, a man known as Mattias Iheme from Eloka village of Ibele community wanted to break that covenant by going to marry a lady from Oru community. The community is precisely Awo-Omamma. When he intimated the elders of his intention to marry from Oru community, they reminded him of the covenant and dire consequence of breaking the covenant laid by ancestors.

The young man ignored all warnings and advanced into the marriage activities. After the marriage, he fell sick and died shortly.

The brotherly relationship between Ibele and Oru people continued until lately. For example, few years after the Nigerian civil war, the Oru medicine men were frequently seen parading in Ibele community healing people with their herbs.

Some of the Oru natural healers settled at Ibele while some comes and returns to their homes after days business. At those days, many of them became popularly known in Ibele like the one called "Onye Awo", etc.

The word "Ibele" is culled from Oru dialect. For more explanations, the word is a combination of two words as thus- "ibe" and "ele".

== Etymology ==
The term "ibe", generally, means "kinsmen" in Ibo language. But the Orus and the communities adjoining them use the term- "ibe" or "mbe" to depict or mean "home", "plaza" or "station". Majority of communities in old Anambra state uses the word "ibe" as to mean "home" as the Oru people do. This must be connected to their proximity because the Orus are close to the communities that fall into Anambra State. Both words "ibe" that means "kinsmen" in Ibo language and "ibe" that means "house" to Oru people are pronounced differently.

For example, the ending alphabet "E" in the word "ibe" with the meaning "kinsmen" in Iboland is pronounced in a more humbler and cooler tone and that prompted the Ibo grammatic scholars to add "H" as a prefix to identify it especially when it represent a name of a person.

While the same term- "ibe" as used by Oru people to mean "home" has its ending character "E" pronounced in a more faster tone.

Both terms represents similar interest in Ibo grammatic setting. For example: "ibe" means kinsmen, it equally means home and can be interchanged with the term "Ikwu".

The next term that made up the Ibele is "ele" which is simply a name of antelope in Ibo language. So the combination of "ibe" and "ele" when contracted gives birth to "Ibele".

The name "Ibele" wholly means "the home of antelope" and is not a name of a particular human being as alleged. The proof of the name as for parcel of land is not far fetched. The community consists of three original settlers. Both settlers came from different and distant communities and to amalgamate as one at the vast parcel of land otherwise known as Ibele. So the word Ibele will be rightly explained as a name of a portion of land or a territory.

== Modern development ==
Ibele commenced as an ancient kingdom ruled by Nze Durudo priest-dynasty. By the 19th century, the community joined with its neighboring communities as Umele, Amakor and Obeakpu to form Amazoana community. In 1910, the community hosted the first European colonial master- named Douglas who was the Divisional Officer of Owerri province who joined the Amazona with Aka communities to bear Umuaka with a warrant staff handed to a man from Ibele who became the first traditional ruler of the entire Umuaka community. The Divisional officer made the trip into Ibele land as he came to inspect the destroyed Igwekala shrine in Umunoha by British forces in 1906 and 1908. During provincial demarcation process, Umuaka was placed under Orlu provincial territory. In 1985, Amazona became separated from Umuaka and assumed the status of an autonomous community with exclusion of Ibele that remained under the Umuaka community. In 2002, Ibele community gained its autonomy from Umuaka. As an autonomous community, Ibele was accredited by Imo State government with 21 villages. These are the names of the villages and their order of seniority:

1. Eloka
2. Echekwuaku
3. Ononaku
4. Ekwunna
5. Ohaukwu
6. Anorue
7. Umunwekechukwu
8. Umu-mgbaba
9. Okpuromelu
10. Okewuihe
11. Otankwu
12. Abamibe
13. Okwara-ononaobi
14. Omagwu
15. Arunnwa
16. Emechara
17. Ojiobi
18. Enwere
19. Nwannaeri
20. Ojiagwu
21. Nneji
