= Henry Nwawuba =

Nigerian politician

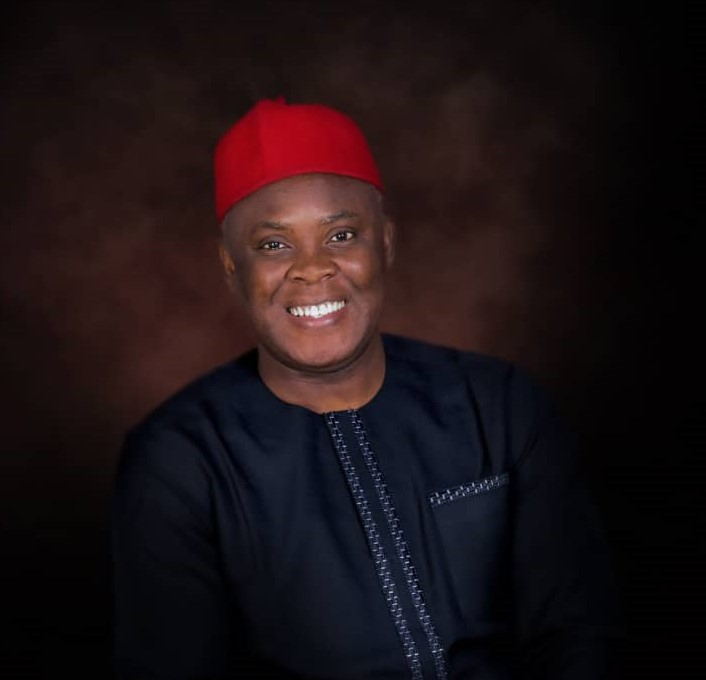

Executive Secretary - National Assembly Library Trust Fund
- Incumbent
- Assumed office June 2023 - Date
- Preceded by: Pioneer

Personal details
- Born: Henry Ndochukwu Johanan Nwawuba; 27 February 1969 (age 57) Aba, Abia, Nigeria
- Party: All Progressives Congress (APC)
- Education: University of Westminster; University of Jos
- Website: henrynwawuba.com

Henry Nwawuba // (born 27 February 1969) is a Nigerian politician, entrepreneur, banker and philanthropist. He currently serves as the Pioneer Executive Secretary of the National Assembly Library Trust Fund He was a member of the House of Representatives (Nigeria), that represented Mbaitoli/Ikeduru Federal Constituency of Imo state. He was elected on both occasions on the platform of the People's Democratic Party (PDP). He was the Deputy Chairman of the House Committee on Niger Delta.

== Early life and education ==
Henry Nwawuba was born in Aba, Abia State Abia State (old Imo State), Nigeria to Chief Henry Nwawuba (Snr) and Late Christiana Nwawuba Nee Meniru from Nawfia in Anambra state. He had his primary education at Bayero University Staff School Kano and Secondary school at both the Aminu Kano Commercial College and the Federal Government College Kano. He attended the University of Jos, Plateau State from 1988 to 1992 where he obtained a Bachelor of Arts Degree. Thereafter he proceeded to the United Kingdom after his National Youth Service Corps in 1993, where he studied Business computing for a master's degree Programme at the University of Westminster.

== Career and political life ==
Henry Nwawuba before his advent into politics had a flourishing career as a banker, cofounding one of Nigeria's foremost Microfinance Banks, Fortis Micro Finance Banks Plc. His private businesses include ventures in Oil and Gas, Tourism, Telecommunications and Agro Processing. He was the chief executive officer of NICNOC Nigeria Limited, an indigenous Oil and Gas Servicing Firm. He also sat on the Board of Capital Meat Ltd, one of Nigeria's largest emerging agricultural meat processing companies. Before then, he worked as a computer farm manager at City of London Colt Technology Services Telecommunications in London, England.

Upon his return to Nigeria from the United Kingdom in 2006, Mr Nwawuba served as Special Assistant on Special Duties to the Governor of Plateau State Mr Michael Botmang. He retired to private business until in 2015 when he was elected into the House of Representatives (Nigeria) to represent Mbaitoli/Ikeduru federal Constituency of Imo state on the platform of the People's Democratic Party. He was re-elected to serve a second term in 2019. His legislative interests include Reforms and Innovation in Policy Formulation, the development of the Niger Delta, local content, human capital development, oil and gas, banking and information technology. Nwawuba has led several campaigns for the development of the Niger Delta region which hosts oil and gas activities – Nigeria's main revenue earner. He is the Deputy Chairman of the House Committee on Niger Delta and the chairman/Coordinator of Nigeria's first ever Legislative Dialogue on the Niger Delta.

In March 2020, he led other lawmakers from the South East (Nigeria) to demand from the Federal government of Nigeria the inclusion of the region in infrastructure projects to be funded from the $22 billion loan from international finance agencies vide a petition he presented from the South East Elites. In 2019, he was appointed the Deputy Chairman of House Committees on Niger Delta.

In the 8th National Assembly He co-sponsored a Bill for the establishment of the South East Development Commission which scaled first and second reading in the Green Chamber after a rocky start. He also served on the technical committee on the passage of the Petroleum Industry Bill (PIB) between 2018 and 2019. The bill was denied Assent by President Mohammadu Buhari at the end of 2019. He has been re-nominated to serve on the committee to consider its passage in 9th Assembly. In May 2020, he sponsored a Motion on "the need for Nigeria to develop a long term social and economic development framework vision" which was unanimously adopted by the House of Representatives. The Federal Government of Nigeria in response inaugurated a Steering Committee co-chaired by the Minister of Finance Zainab Ahmed and Atedo Peterside in October 2020 to develop a framework for Nigeria Agenda 2050. Following the outbreak of the COVID-19 pandemic the House of Representatives reworked its legislative agenda to align with post COVID realities. Henry Nwawuba was drafted to serve on the committee that re-drafted the document and currently serves as the Chairman of the Ad hoc Committee on the Implementation of the Legislative Agenda of the 9th House.

Nwawuba has been on several international legislative delegations for Nigeria, including the elite team sent to South Africa to protest the xenophobia suffered by Nigerians in that Country in 2017 with the then Majority Leader (now Speaker of the House Femi Gbajabiamila).

== Personal life ==
Henry Nwawuba is married to Mrs. Leton Nwawuba (née Idemyor) who hails from Rivers State and is blessed with two children.

== Awards and recognitions ==
- Chieftaincy title: Ogbuhuruzo of Amaukwu Orodo – July 2016
- Ambassador of Peace
- Patron, Actors Guild of Nigeria
- Member, Chartered Institute of Bankers of Nigeria
- Grand Patron, Owerri Sports Club
- Golden Service Award – Rotary Club

== Publications ==
- Niger Delta: Time to take responsibility
- The Journey So Far: Letter to my Great Constituents
