= Oke Umurhohwo =

Politician, marketing executive, entrepreneur

- Born: Ughelli North, Delta State, Nigeria
- Citizenship: Nigerian
- Education: University of Lagos; MSc
- Occupations: Politician, marketing executive, entrepreneur
- Employer: StarTimes Nigeria
- Organization(s): Ughelli Rovers F.C., Oke Umurhohwo Foundation
- Known for: Political activism, marketing, sports, humanitarianism
- Title: Marketing director
- Awards: Most Innovative Marketing Manager of the Year (2023), Most Enterprising Tech Marketing Personality of the Year (2024),
- Website: https://okeumurhohwo.com/

Oke Umurhohwo is a Nigerian marketing executive, politician and a member of the Peoples Democratic Party (PDP). In 2026, he emerged as the Peoples Democratic Party (PDP) candidate for the Ughelli North Constituency II seat in the Delta State House of Assembly, ahead of the 2027 general elections. He is the founder of the Oke Umurhohwo Foundation. In 2023, he founded the Ughelli Rovers F.C. In the same year, he was awarded the Most Innovative Marketing Manager of the Year" at the Titans of Tech Awards. In 2024, he was awarded the Most Enterprising Tech Marketing Personality of the Year at the 10th edition of the Nigeria Technology Awards (NiTA).

== Early life and education ==
Oke is a native of Ughelli North, Delta State, Nigeria. He obtained a Bachelor of Science degree in Marine Sciences at the University of Lagos. He proceeded to obtain a master's degree in business administration in marketing at the same institution.

== Academic and work career ==
Oke started his career at Jubilee Mortgage Bank. He later moved to BIF Media as a research editor. He also served at Wecyclers Corporation as a media specialist before he proceeded to the Federal Ministry of Environment and served as an environmental scientist. He joined Itel Mobile, where he rose to become the marketing manager for Itel Mobile's West Africa region. In 2023, he was shortlisted as one of Brandcom's "35 Under 35" marketing and communications professionals. In the same year, he was awarded the "Most Innovative Marketing Manager of the Year" at the Titans of Tech Awards.

In November 2024, he served as the Head of Marketing at Zap Africa. In September 2025, he moved to StarTimes Nigeria to become the marketing director.

He is the founder of the Oke Umurhohwo Foundation. In 2023, he founded the Ughelli Rovers F.C.

== Political career ==
Oke is a member of the Peoples Democratic Party (PDP). In 2019, he served as the Lagos State new media coordinator for the PDP 2019 presidential campaign. He was a member of the Lagos team that championed and advocated for the Not Too Young To Run bill before it was signed into law by President Muhammadu Buhari on 31 May 2018.

In 2023, Oke contested for the PDP nomination for the Delta State House of Assembly seat to represent Ughelli North Constituency II, but the seat was won by Hon. Onoriode Agofure, who became the party's flagbearer ahead of the 2023 general elections. In May 2026, he contested again and emerged as the winner of the Peoples Democratic Party (PDP) primary for the same seat, which thereby made him the party's candidate for that position ahead of the 2027 general election.

== Awards and honours ==
Award name	Year
Most Enterprising Tech Marketing Personality of the Year at the 10th edition of the Nigeria Technology Awards (NiTA).	2024
Most Innovative Marketing Manager of the Year at the Titans of Tech Awards.	2023
Tech Marketing Personality of the Year at the 9th edition of the Nigeria Technology Awards (NiTA).	2023
Innovative Marketing Personality of the Year at the 16th Africa Beacon of ICT (ABoICT) Awards.	2023
Brandcom 35 Under 35 (2023) at the Brandcom Awards	2023
Afrimact Philanthropy Award (2023): at the Africa's Monarchs, Arts, Culture, and Tourism Awards (AFRIMACT)	2023
