= Amaebu Ogwa =

Village in Imo state, Nigeria

- Village
- Interactive map of Amaebu Ogwa
- Location in Nigeria
- Coordinates: 5.63368714°N 7.08205827°E
- Country: Nigeria
- State: Imo State
- LGA: Mbaitoli
- Elevation: 162 m (531 ft)
- Time zone: UTC+1 (WAT)

Ogwa is a village in southeastern Nigeria. It is located in Mbaitoli local government area in Imo State.

== Climate ==
In Amaebu Ogwa, the months of January and February register the average highest temperatures. The least humid month in Amaebu Ogwa is January, with an average relative humidity of 53%.
