= Marcelinus Nlemigbo =

Marcellinius Nlemigbo is a Nigerian legal practitioner, politician and social entrepreneur from Imo State. He was the former chairman of the Inter Party Advisory Council (IPAC) of the All-Progressive Congress (APC).

== Education ==
He is a graduate, and in 2017, he was called to bar as a barrister and solicitor of the Supreme Court of Nigeria.

== Career in politics ==
He joined politics at a young age and later rose to become a chairman of the Peoples Democratic Party (PDP). He later joined APC and on September 1, 2020, INEC made its decision, and he was recognized as the duly elected leader of the Caretaker Committee set up by the National Working Committee of the APC to oversee the affairs of the Imo State Chapter of the party pending the conduct of fresh congresses in Imo State He was in support that presidency should be shifted to southeast Nigeria, a development which he believed will enhance national unity and integrity. He is known to be the longest serving state party chairman in Nigeria. In 2016 however, a police inspector attached to him was assassinated at Umudagu, Mberi in Mbaitoli LGA of Imo state, the incident sparked number of controversies. During the 2023 general election in Nigeria, he urged INEC, all political parties Nigerians and electorates to synergize for smooth elections that would encourage a free, credible and fair outcome of the elections.

On September 1, 2020, the Independent National Electoral Commission (INEC), and the National Chairman, Caretaker Committee of the APC recognized him as the duly elected leader of the Caretaker Committee set up by the National Working Committee of the APC to oversee the affairs of the Imo State Chapter of the party pending the conduct of fresh congresses in Imo State. In 2017, he was called to bar as a barrister and solicitor of the Supreme Court of Nigeria.

== Controversy ==
In 2019, he was suspended over an alleged claims that he was engaging in anti party activities. Speaking at a Press Conference in Owerri, the factional Chairman of APC in the State, Daniel Nwafor reviewed the information to the press. Nwafor claimed that Nlemigbo has not been attending the party's meetings in his Ezinihittee ward in Mbaitolu Local Government Area of the State in the last one year, consequence to calling the National Chairman of the Party Adams Oshimole to effect the suspension of Nlemigbo. However, on September 1, 2020, the INEC, and the National Chairman, Caretaker Committee of the APC recognized him as the duly elected leader of the Caretaker Committee set up by the National Working Committee of the APC to oversee the affairs of the Imo State Chapter of the party pending the conduct of fresh congresses in Imo State.
