= Titans of Tech Awards =

- Awarded for: Recognising exceptional achievements in Nigeria's ICT Industry
- Country: Nigeria
- Presented by: Tech TV Global Network
- First award: 2004

Titans of Tech Awards established in 2004 is a Nigerian award organized by Tech TV Global Network. . The award is designed to showcase Nigeria's ICT industry, celebrating the exceptional achievements of pioneers, innovators, big thinkers and organisations who are at the forefront of pushing technology adoption and usage in Nigeria.

Some notable organizations that are recipients of the award includes Itel, Nigerian Communications Commission, Covenant University, Parallex Bank, MTN, Zoho, Alpha Technologies, Zinox Technologies and notable individuals includes; Governor Godwin Obaseki, Engr. Ernest Ndukwe, Oke Umurhohwo, Leo Stan Ekeh, Former deputy governor Femi Pedro and Mike Adenuga.

== History ==
The Titans of tech awards was launched in 2004 by Don Pedro Aganbi, Lead Consultant at Tech TV.

The 2022 event was chaired by chairman, MTN Nigeria, Engr. Ernest Ndukwe, Itel emerged most Innovative tech brand of the year

The 2023 Titans of Tech Awards ceremony was Chaired by former Deputy Governor of Lagos State, Femi Pedro, the Chairman of Globacom Limited and the Mike Adenuga was conferred with Africa Telecoms Hero Award and Governor Babajide Sanwo-Olu's basic education reform program, EkoExcel was awarded Most Innovative Digital Learning Platform of the Year and Parallex Bank was also awarded the most innovative digital financial solutions provider of the year 2023

The 2025 Titans of Tech Awards was held on 25 July 2025 at the Oriental Hotel, Lekki, Lagos, Nigeria.

== Categories ==
- Best Ict Solutions Provider
- Most Innovative Business Productivity Solutions Provider
- Information Security Compliance Organization
- Best Business Process Outsourcing Company
- Most Innovative Data Centre Service Provider
- Most Innovative Tech Brand
- Cloud Infrastructure Provider
- Most Innovative Telecom Connectivity Provider
- Digital Transformation Company
- Most Innovative Internet Service Provider
- Most Innovative Digital State
- Data Centre Industry Influencer
- Most Innovative Digital Learning Platform
- Telecom Advocacy Man
- Digital compliance state
- Most Innovative Clearinghouse Service Provider
- Best Startups Supportive Online Media
- Digital Transformation Governor
- Most Innovative Indigenous ICT Company
- ICT Innovation Governor
- Digital Economy Compliance state

=== Special awards ===
- Private Security ICON
- Tech Media ICON
- Excellence in Innovative Service Delivery Award
- Outstanding Promoter of Digital Economy Award
- Outstanding Promoter of Digital Economy Award
