= Umunoha =

Town in southeastern Nigeria

Coordinates: 5°37′N 6°59′E

Umunoha is a town in south-eastern Nigeria near the city of Owerri. It is an Igbo town. Umunoha is south of Eziama Obiato and Afara communities; and is North and Northeast of Ogbaku, Azara Obiato and Ejemekwuru communities; and is north and northwest of Ifakala and Afara communities. It is served by the great east–west road, the Port-Harcourt-Lagos Highway. Umunoha is about thirteen kilometers from Owerri, the Imo State capital. It is a small, compact but thickly populated community with a projected 1997 population of twenty-five thousand people.

== Culture and people ==
Umunoha is known for certain traditions and culture, such as Igwekala shrine, Orie-Amaigwe market, and Mmanwu masquerade.

Umunoha's famous Igwekala shrine is a jungle that covers over 100 acres of land near the center of Umunoha. Igwekala is renowned for its healing powers, and people come from all over the continent to receive healing and recover their health. This is also an economical source for some of the indigenes and the native doctors who tend the shrine. They are known as "Mbranigwe", meaning members of the Igwekala cult. Igwekala was combed by the British during Colonial times, and was combed again by the Nigerian Army during the Nigerian Civil War (Biafran Genocide, 1966 - 1970).

Umunoha has a notable market known as Orie-Amaigwe. This market meets every eight days from 5am to 8pm, and is well attended by buyers from neighboring towns and all over Imo State, and Nigeria at large. While they have other small markets in their various villages, like Eke-Ibile, Nkwo-obuu, Ahia ututu (umuokparaihe or ahia okirida), and Nkwo-Okoturu. The market sells a vast variety of products.

Umunoha also has a famous cultural masquerade known as Mmanwu. Every male child of Umunoha born in Nigeria is required by tradition to be initiated into a masquerade cult at puberty, and become an Otigba as they are called. The female children also join the culture, but their membership known as Erere is not as serious as the male children. A male child of Umunoha initiation into Mmanwu signifies and authenticates the child as an Okechi son, or "Diala Okechi" as they hail and greet each other, meaning real son of Umunoha.

== History ==
The town's creation myth usually, but not always, claims it was founded by a common ancestor, who begat several children to whom he allocated areas on which to settle. These areas eventually became villages, according to the tradition of the origin of Umunoha, an autonomous community in Mbaitoli Local Government Area (LGA) in Imo State. According to tradition, a sort of warlord called Nnoha Okechi with vague Aro ancestry, but certainly a peripatetic individual, migrated from Ozuzu in the present Etche Local Government Area of Rivers State, and settled in Umunoha, having decisively defeated the original Isu settlers, who resisted him fiercely. He dispersed the Isu, seized their land, and distributed it among his children according to seniority as follows: Duru, his first son, became the progenitor of the present Umuduru village; Okparaoma, Duru's younger brother from the same mother and the third child, the progenitor of the present Umuokparaoma village. Okparafor, the fourth child and third son from a different mother, the progenitor of the present Umuokparafor village; Durundom, Duru's only sister and Nnoha's second child whom he refused to give out in marriage, remained at home and begat the present Umudurundom village; and Mbara, brother of Okparafor and Nnoha's fifth and last child begat the present Umumbara village. Later the area so divided and effectively occupied was renamed Umunoha. Here is a case where consanguineal relationship is a sine qua non for citizenship.

From the beginning of the history of Umunoha to the present, the town has been ruled by the royal family of Egbuchulam Chimezie of Okwaraihekuna Obakpu, dating as far back as Colonial time(1800s) when they ruled the Igwebuike Kingdom (A collection of communities in Mbaitoli before the creation of local governments). The third-generation ruler and leader of the royal family, HRH, Late Christopher Nlemchukwu Egbuchulam, Eze Nnoha II of Umunoha who was buried in November 2018, was once the Surveyor-General of Imo State. He left that post to become King, succeeding his father. The present heir to the throne, his eldest son Engineer Chukwuma prepared with the rest of the royal family for his coronation in November 2019 to become the fourth-generation traditional ruler. Tradition and law of the land demand mourning for the dead king for one year.

== Climate ==
The weather in this city is tropical. Umunoha experiences notable precipitation levels for the bulk of the months in a given year. There is, however, just a small time frame that is characterised by aridity. The predominant climate in this area falls under the Köppen-Geiger classification and is designated as Am. According to the information available, the average annual temperature in Umuoha is 25.9 °C (78.6 °F). Here, there is roughly 2,412 mm (95.0 inches) of precipitation per year.

== Related reading ==
- William Borders (August 15, 1970). "In a Former Biafran Town, Palm Wine Flows Again". New York Times.
- "Igwe-Kala juju cult is dynamited". Smithsonian Libraries. 1993.
- "Things Fall Apart: Teacher's Guide: By Chinua Achebe". Penguin Random House. 2001.
- Chukwuemeka Onwubu (1975). "Review: Igbo Society: Three Views Analyzed". Africa Today. 22 (3): 71. JSTOR 4185524.

== See also ==
- List of villages in Imo State
