= Nwachukwu =

- Language: Igbo

Origin
- Origin: Nigerian
- Meaning: Child of God
- Region of origin: Igboland

Nwachukwu // is a very common Igbo surname. It means “child of God”.

== Notable individuals with the name ==
- Fortunatus Nwachukwu (born 1960), Nigerian Catholic archbishop and diplomat
- Igwe Aja-Nwachukwu (1952–2015), Nigerian politician
- Ike Nwachukwu (born 1940), Nigerian army officer and politician
- Mary Nwachukwu (born 1969), Nigerian handball player
- Obinna Nwachukwu (born 1992), Nigerian footballer
- Sorina Nwachukwu (born 1987), German track star
- Sunny Nwachukwu (born 1976), Nigerian footballer
- Uti Nwachukwu (born 1982), Nigerian television personality
- Uzoma Nwachukwu (born 1990), American football player
- Zainab Balogun-Nwachukwu (born 1989), Nigerian actress
- Osinachi Nwachukwu (1979-2022) Nigerian gospel musician
- Kiliwi Nwachukwu (1931-1992) Nigerian fighter
- Christian Nwachukwu (born 2005)
- Dubem Nwachukwu (born 2000) Nigerian track and field athlete
- Zainab Balogun-Nwachukwu (born 1989) Nigerian actress
- Goodness Nwachukwu (born 1998) Nigerian athlete
- Chima Moneke (born 1995) Nigerian professional basketball
- chukwu (born 1960) Nigerian prelate of the Catholic Church
