= Obadare Peter Adewale =

Nigerian entrepreneur

- Citizenship: Nigerian
- Education: University of Liverpool (MSc in cybersecurity); Saïd Business School (MSc); Federal Polytechnic Ede (Diploma)
- Occupations: Technopreneur, Cybersecurity
- Employer: Digital Encode Limited
- Known for: The first EC-Council Licensed Penetration Tester in Africa.
- Notable work: Digital Encode Limited
- Awards: (2023) Forbes Best of Africa Outstanding Digital Trust Leader; (2022) Business DayLifetime Achievement; (2018) African Leadership Award; (2020) ICT Watch Magazine Cybersecurity Personality of the decade
- Website: digitalencode.net

Obadare Peter Adewale (Yoruba pronunciation) is a Nigerian technology entrepreneur and cybersecurity expert. He is a professor of practice in cybersecurity in Nigeria, and widely regarded as the most certified Pan-African leader in cybersecurity. He is also the co-founder of Digital Encode Limited and Forbes Best of Africa Outstanding Digital Trust Leader Awardee.

== Career ==
Adewale serves on the Cybersecurity Advisory Board for the Government of Lagos State. He has contributed to the development of Open-Source Security Testing Methodology Manual and holds a lifetime membership with the Open Worldwide Application Security Project. In 2024, he was appointed first Professor of Practice (Cybersecurity) by Miva Open University, Nigeria.

=== Digital Encode Limited ===
In 2003 Adewale co-founded Digital Encode Limited is a Nigerian-based cybersecurity and IT assurance firm. The company which specializes in providing risk management and compliance solutions for businesses in Nigeria, West Africa, and other regions has established itself as a key player in the financial and telecommunications sectors, serving a significant majority of financial institutions and telecommunications companies in Nigeria. The company is known for its vendor-independent approach to enterprise network security and IT infrastructure management and has served as a strategic partner to the Central Bank of Nigeria Electronic Fraud Forum.

== Awards and recognition ==
- 2022 – Business Day Lifetime Achievement Award
- 2018 – African Leadership Award & Medal of Honor in Business (ALM)
- 2020 – ICT Watch Magazine Cybersecurity Personality of the Decade
- 2023 – Forbes Best of Africa Outstanding Digital Trust Leader
