= Obeakpu =

Village in Imo State, Nigeria

Obeakpu is a small village in Umuaka, Njaba, Imo State, Nigeria. Obeakpu is located at 5.69933°N 7.03100°W. The village of Amakor (now an autonomous community) is located to the east. Umele village is nearby in the west. The southern part of Obeakpu borders Ibele (now also an autonomous community). The Njaba River borders the village to the north.
