= Sim Shagaya =

Nigerian businessman

Simdul Shagaya (born 1975) known as Sim Shagaya is a Nigerian electrical engineer and technology business executive. He is the founder and chancellor of Miva Open University, a digital and distance learning higher institution, uLesson, an educational technology company offering e-learning resources to African students, and Konga, a Nigeria e-commerce company.

== Early life and education ==
Sim Shagaya was born in 1975 to John Nanzip Shagaya. His father was a Brigadier General in the Nigerian Army and served as commander of ECOMOG force in Liberia in 1993. He was elected Senator for Plateau South Senatorial District in 2007 to the 6th Senate of the Federal Republic of Nigeria. Senator Shagaya died on 11 February 2018 in a fatal auto crash in his home state of Plateau.

Shagaya received his secondary school education at the Nigerian Military School, Zaria, and enlisted in the Nigerian Army where he had a stint before leaving to further his studies in the United States. He studied Electrical Engineering at George Washington University where he earned a bachelor of science degree. He attended Thayer School of Engineering, Dartmouth College for his master of science degree in Engineering Management, and Harvard Business School where he obtained a master of business administration (MBA) in 2003.

== Career ==
Shagaya’s career started in the late 1990s with several failed start-ups. In 2005, he founded his first successful company, E-Motion Advertising - an outdoor advertising agency. He ran the company until 2019 when it was acquired by Loatsad Promomedia. In 2011, Shagaya founded his second company, DealDey - a shopping website that tracks online discounts on popular goods and services for consumers.

In 2012, relying on his experience from the DealDey company, Shagaya diversified into e-commerce. He founded Konga, an online retail marketplace selling a wide range of consumer products. Konga was one of the early e-commerce start-ups in Nigeria and was initially impacted by lack of trust in online transactions, payment security, poor delivery infrastructure and low internet penetration. The company later became one of the popular online shopping companies in Nigeria. Shagaya stepped down from the company as its chief executive officer in 2016. In 2018, it was acquired by Zinox Group - a Nigerian technology company.

=== Edtech ===
In 2019, Shagaya switched interest from e-commerce to education and founded uLesson Group - an educational technology company focused on making learning material accessible to African students online. uLesson's e-learning platform went live in 2020, initially focusing on primary and secondary school education offering curriculum based learning resources through digital devices such as recorded video lessons, quizzes, and assessments.

In 2023, Shagaya founded Miva Open University under the uLesson Group. He is the chancellor of the university.
