= ULesson =

Nigerian education company

The uLesson Group
- Type: Private
- Industry: edtech
- Founded: 2019
- Founder: Sim Shagaya
- Headquarters: Abuja, Nigeria
- Area served: Africa
- Products: uLesson Education
- Subsidiaries: Miva Open University
- Website: https://ulesson.com/

The uLesson Group commonly known as uLesson, is a Nigerian edtech company, also operating as an online education platform through uLesson Education mobile application for primary and secondary E-learning. It was founded in 2019 by Sim Shagaya.

== History ==
The startup first launched in 2019 with SD cards and USBs pre-recorded with videos for K-12 students. It has gone on to add quizzes, homework help feature and education content for learners in Nigeria, Ghana, Sierra Leone, Liberia, and Gambia within the K-12 segment since the launch of its app in March 2020. Early 2021, uLesson raised a $7.5 million Series A in 2021 and a $15 million Series B later in 2021. On 26 October 2021, uLesson received a global appeal, as it featured on a television program aired on the Cable News Network.

=== uLesson Education ===
On 11 March 2020, uLesson officially launched the uLesson Education application. On 9 July 2020, uLesson Education introduced the Junior High School library. In August 2020, it was reported that uLesson Education, had helped Students in cracking WAEC Exams. On 3 January 2023, uLesson Education announced part sponsorship with NCF National Under-17 Cricket Championship. On 2 March 2023, uLesson announced the uNAT tournament, tagged “Rise to the Challenge” with a 5 million naira reward.

=== Miva Open University ===
On 10 March 2023, uLesson unveiled Miva, an online university. On 16 May 2023, the university got licensed with the National Universities Commission and began operating in Nigeria.
