= Ubomiri =

Town in Imo state, Nigeria

Coordinates: 5.5333°N 7.0000°E

Ubomiri is a town in Mbaitoli of Imo State located near Owerri, capital city of Imo State, in southeastern Nigeria.

The New Imo State International Market, also known as Ahia Rochas, is located in Ubomiri.

== Geography ==
Ubomiri is an ancient kingdom comprising nine villages: Egbeada, Amauburu, Umuabali, Obookpo, Umuocha, Ohuba, Ohum, Ahama and Umuojinaka.

Currently, Ubomiri comprises three Autonomous Communities:

- Amawuihe Autonomous Community, made up of Ahama Ohum Umuocha and Ohuba villages. The reigning King is Eze Clifford R. Amadi the Uhie 1 of Amawuihe.
- Ishi Ubomiri Autonomous Community, made up of Obokpo Umuabali Amauburu and Umuojinaka villages. The reigning King is Eze George Eke the Ishi 1 of Ishi Ubomiri.
- Egbeada Autonomous Community, made up of Egbeada village. The reigning king is Eze Edward The Ada 1 of Egbeada.

Ubomiri is surrounded by towns, including Akwakuma, Ifakala, Irete, Ohii, ogbaku, Amakohia and Mbieri and Nwaorieubi, the headquarters of Mbaitoli LGA.
