= Ndegwu =

Town in Imo State, Nigeria

Ndegwuis a community in the Owerri West Local Government area of Imo State. The community is subdivided into five villages which includes; Umuekerekpu, Umuahum, Umuezu, Umuomara and Umuogwuta. Each of these villages has at least eight kindreds. Ndegwu is bounded by the east by Orogwe, west by Okwukwu, north by Amakohia ubi and south by Irete.

== Religion and Demographics ==
The people are predominantly Christians with a majority being Anglican and Catholic with a few Pentecostal Christians and pagans. Ndegwu people are hard working and heart warming people who value education to its core. The people are mostly farmers and business men who earn a living through that means. Ndegwu have an enabling environment that welcomes investors and people from all parts of the world. There are three government schools and some private schools which provides basic education for the people. The land is also blessed with good vegetation and mineral resources especially crude oil which is recently discovered. The place is rich in culture and is headed by a president general as the head of the community. Imo state is a predominantly Igbo speaking state, with Igbo people constituting a majority of 98%.
