= Ejemekwuru =

Community in Imo State, Nigeria

Ejemekwuru is an Igbo-speaking community located in the northwestern part of Imo State, in southeastern Nigeria. It is situated within the Oguta Local Government Area and forms part of the larger Owerri cultural zone of the state. The community is primarily agrarian, with farming serving as a major occupation, and it shares cultural, linguistic, and traditional ties with neighbouring Igbo communities.

== Geography, language, and demographics ==
Ejemekwuru is a community in the Oguta Local Government Area of Imo State, in southeastern Nigeria. The inhabitants are predominantly Igbo and speak the Igbo language, with a dialect that is closely related to Central Igbo.

Ejemekwuru is located along the Ogbaku–Oguta road, 15 km from Owerri, 6 km from Ogbaku, and 17 km from Kalabari Beach in Oguta. It is bordered to the west by Agwa , to the east by Ishieke in Azara Obiato, to the north by Akabor and Izombe, and to the south by Ogbaku communities. Ejemekwuru also lies on the southeastern boundary of the Oguta Local Government Area.

The town covers an area of about 16 km^{2}, of which roughly one-third is zoned for residential use and the remainder for agriculture. In January 1996, Ejemekwuru was granted the status of an autonomous community by the Government of Imo State, a decision published in the Imo State of Nigeria Extraordinary Gazette, No. 2, Vol. 21, in April 1996. Prior to this, it was part of the Awa Autonomous Community.

Ejemekwuru consists of five main village groups: Umuagwo, Umuebe, Umuawo, Umuoduwa, and Umuakum. Each village group has its own administrative unit, which is further subdivided into smaller villages and kindreds.

The community is served by four major roads running north–south and east–west. The north–south route, also known as the Ogbaku–Oguta road, connects Ogbaku to the south with Izombe and Oguta to the north. The east–west route, the Azara Obiato–Agwa road, links Agwa to the west with Azara Obiato to the east.

Ejemekwuru has a tropical rainforest climate, with two main seasons: the rainy season (udu mmiri), which lasts from April to October, and the dry season (okochi), which runs from November to March.

== Education and other public amenities ==
Ejemekwuru has 3 public elementary schools: Community School Ejemekwuru (formerly St. Peters Catholic School), Primary School Ejemekwuru (formerly St. Marks Anglican School), and Town School Ejemekwuru.

At the center of the community are situated the Ejemekwuru Post Office, a part of the Nigerian Postal Service System, and the Ejemkwuru Primary Health Center, a public primary healthcare clinic. In addition, there are a number of private primary healthcare providers, notably the Marycare Healthcare Center Ejemekwuru, built, funded, and operated by the US-based NGO, Marycare Inc.

== Governance ==
Since becoming an autonomous community, Ejemekwuru is governed by two arms of administration – the Ezeship Council headed by the traditional ruler (Eze) of the community (who goes by the title Ekwuruoma of Ejemekwuru ), and the Town Union headed by the President of the Town Union.

The Eze is the traditional and cultural head of the community. He is also the chief security officer of the community. Since the elevation to an autonomous community in 1996, the Ejemekwuru community has crowned the following traditional rulers (Ezes):

- The late HRH Eze Kevin Ojure-Amadi, Ekwuruoma I of Ejemekwuru (2007 – 2013)
- The late HRH Eze Val Ngozi Nwoke, Ekwuruoma II of Ejemekwuru (2016 – 2019)
- In March 2022, Ezeogo Eze Obinna Hippolyte Duru (Nze n'Ozo, KSJI), Ekwuruoma III of Ejemekwuru became the third traditional ruler of the Ejemekwuru community.

The Town Union (formerly called Ejemekwuru Progressive Union and now Ejemekwuru Town Union) is the political and administrative arm of the community administration. Together with the heads of the groups of villages, they handle political and administrative issues within the community. Ejemekwuru has seen numerous Town Union Presidents since the inception of the formal Town Union in 1945.

== Tourism and sites ==
Ejemekwuru is 15 km from the capital city Owerri and 17 km from Kalabari beach on the shores of the massive Oguta lake. Oguta lake is noted for the presence of the confluence of the blue water from the lake and the muddy water from Orashi River.

Also within Ejemekwuru are the tropical dense forest containing the sacred shrines popularly called Oke Ohia Ezeala. Within this forest are sacred monkeys which in years back were dedicated to the Ezeala deity (so they can not be hunted or eaten), and by such dedication are naturally preserved and protected (similar to animals in a game reserve). This preserved tropical forest is also home to rich fauna and flora, and a natural haven for biodiversity.

Ejemekwuru is also one of the early oil exploration hubs for the Shell Oil company. A legacy Shell well (never produced) is still present in modern-day Ejemekwuru.
