= Umuaka =

Community in Imo state, Nigeria

The Umuaka Autonomous Community is a city in Njaba Local Government Area of Imo State, Nigeria. Umuaka is situated almost mid-way between Orlu and Owerri. The Orlu/Owerri Road passes almost through the center of Umuaka, crossing the Ukwuorji-Nkwerre/Amaigbo Road at Afor Umuaka Market.

Umuaka is made up of ten autonomous communities, Achara, Amaiyi, Amakor, Isiozi, Uba, Ugbele, Ibele, Umuele, Obinwanne and Obeakpu.

Umuaka has a total area of 26.5km2, about 15,000 households and half of Njaba local government area's population. Its population is about 100,000, making Umuaka Ebieri the largest demographic group in Njaba local government, which has a total population of 197,600.

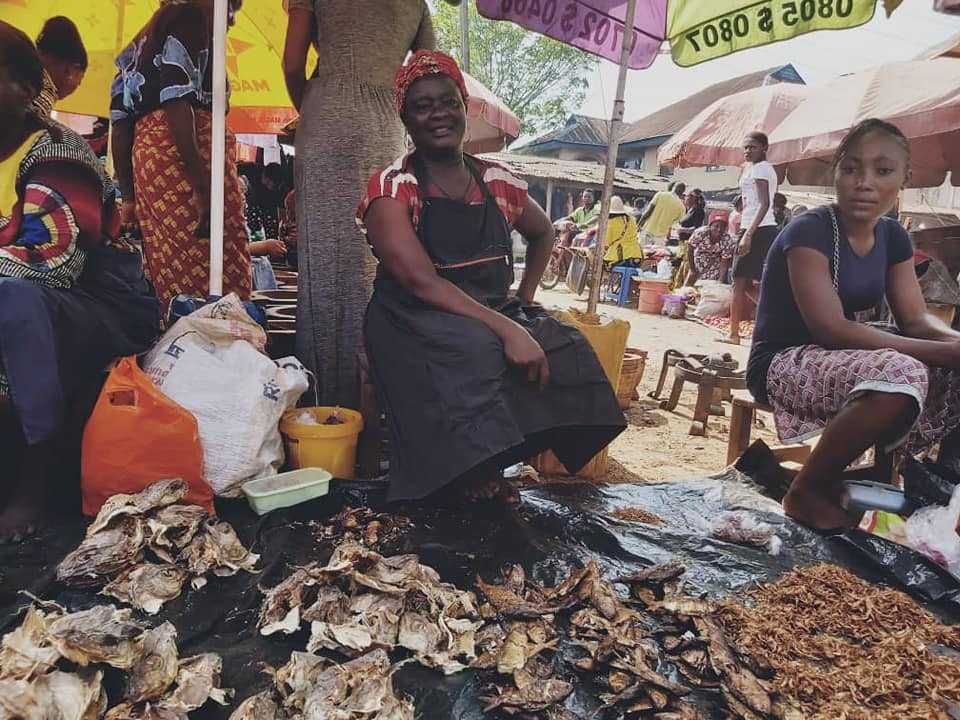
Women Traders in Ime Afo. Trading is an important source of income for women residents of Umuaka

The area is dense rain forest situated in the Njaba river valley. Njaba River is part of a network of water ways in the rain forest that facilitated trade and development for millennia. The people of Umuaka are predominantly traders and farmers. Umuaka is home to the second biggest market in Imo State. Ime Afo, the main market is a magnet of commercial activity and has been an important part of local trade routes for over 500 years. Its position near the Njaba River made it an important market on ancient trade routes. Today it still serves as major feeder market for numerous community markets and small traders in Njaba local government.

The annual Oghu Festival and Christmas are the two most important dates in the social life of Umuaka. Oghu is celebrated from July through August and attracts tourists, visitors and the Umuaka Diaspora. Veiled dancers and masked spirits display their skills and their finery, women weave family bonds with delicious delicacies and children learn sacred community traditions. During December each year Umuaka hosts the annual socio-cultural Simon Okoro Memorial Lecture (since 2002), a football competition and a Christmas carnival. Sons and daughters of Umuaka in Diaspora return in large numbers during these dates and the city and its residents look forward to the festivities and opportunities for cooperation. There are several fine hotels in Umuaka to stay in.

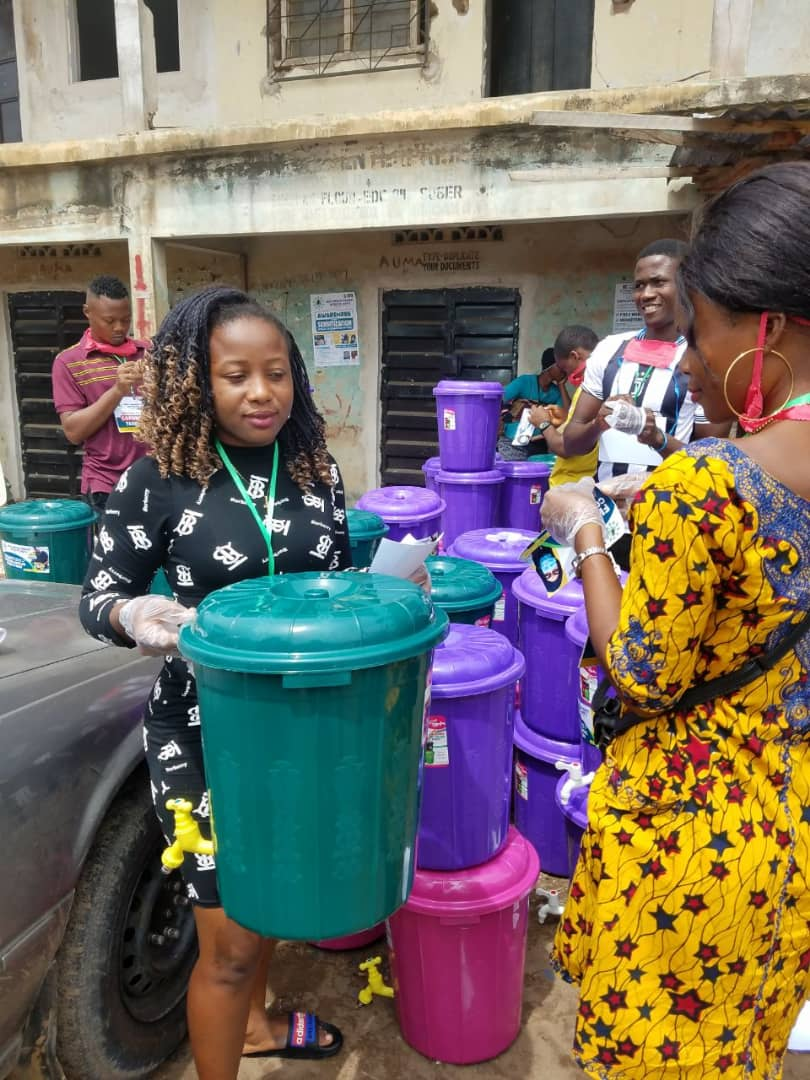
Umuaka residents, during the 2020 Covid19 Pandemic, set up wash stations throughout the city

Emmanuel Emenike, member of the Nigerian national team hails from Umuaka, also Helen Ukaonu, gold medalist with the Nigerian female football team that won gold during the African female Nations Cup hails from the city.

In June 2021 Umuaka was announced as one of 50 cities worldwide selected for the Champions phase of Bloomberg Philanthropies 2021 Mayor's Challenge. UmuAka proposes to develop an app that enables survivors, social workers, and service providers to report gender-based violence incidents, coordinate services including a city health insurance scheme and provide microfinance to support economic independence.

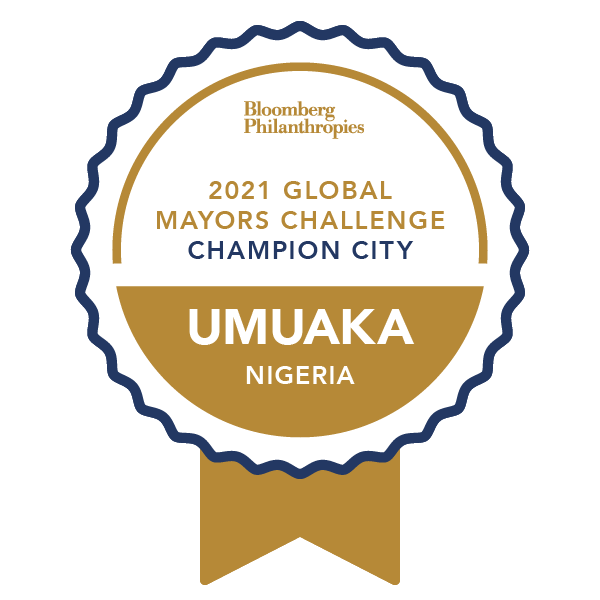
Bloomberg Mayors Challenge 2021 Champion Cities Badge Umuaka

Umuaka is one of 50 Champion Cities Selected to Advance in Global Innovation Competition Uncovering Most Transformative Urban Solutions to Emerge During the COVID-19 Pandemic.

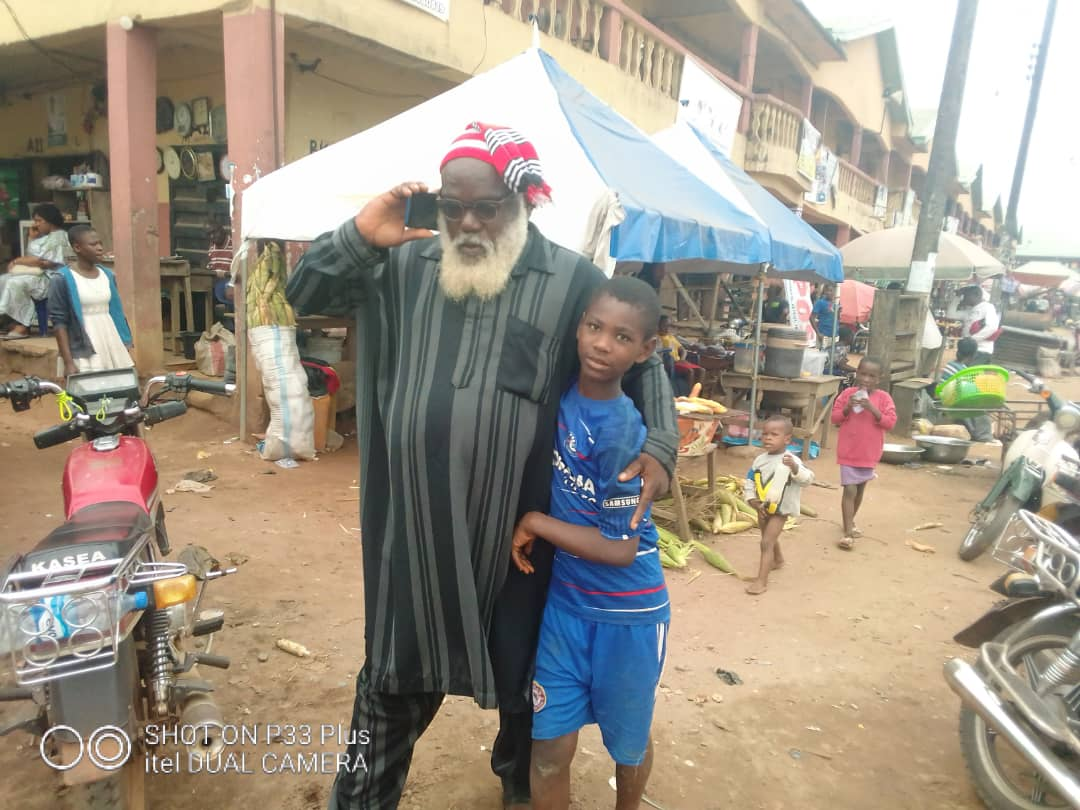
PG of PGs of Umuaka City at the Main Market, Afo Umuaka

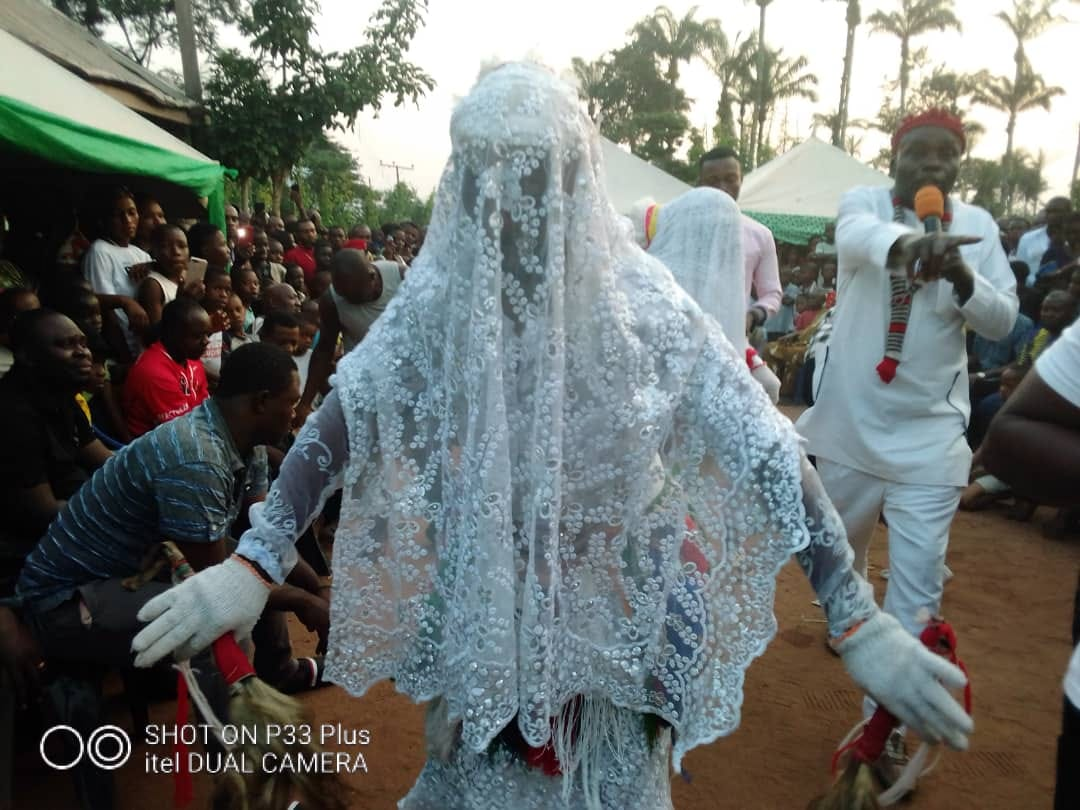
The Oghu Dance Has Been Performed for Centuries

== Oghu Festival ==
Oghu (pronounced: oh woo) is the king of the town's traditional/cultural festivals. Oghu is a special period for sharing and spreading goodwill. It is celebrated in the months of July and August. By the end of June when all planting has been completed, and the first rounds of weeding the farms has been done, the 10 communities of Umuaka begin preparation for the great Oghu day. The communities are grouped by two or three and each group celebrates Oghu on a different day, so residents of each community can attend the performance of others, and friends can invite each other.

Each community welcomes the season at the home of Onye Isi Oghu with Ito Nkwa. At dawn the Nwa Ohu Uzo or Oghu town crier goes through the community chanting Abu Oghu. Once the season starts and all other music is banned till the season is over. No one can see the Nwa Ohu Uzo and if they do they pay a penalty. The drums and wooden gongs start playing when the sun goes down. The music and instruments 'speak' to the dancers in code and the 'respond' with their dance steps. Oghu Umuele Dancers are renowned for their skill and majestic footwork, body movement and songs.

Part of the Oghu festival is the singing of the Oghu songs called Abu Oghu. In the Abu Oghu, the happenings of the year are used to form an oratorio. Brave and patriotic deeds are praised while evil deeds are lampooned. The Abu Oghu is didactic and has great sociological functions to the community.

The only role women have during Oghu is as "Ada Echere", meaning The Awaited Daughter. She rarely dances to the music, but walks onto the dance floor, where other women are not allowed, shakes hands with dancers and drummers and gives them money and gifts. Local folklore says women learnt the Oghu dance from water Spirits and brought it to Umuaka but the men coveted the dance for themselves and after cunningly learning the secrets of the dance they banned women from ever dancing it. Once the dancing and drumming is over, masked spirits known as Egu Udo, Nwa Okwa Mkpuru and Nwa Onye Ure come out and go around the city, performing for gifts, food and money and scaring the girls and women.

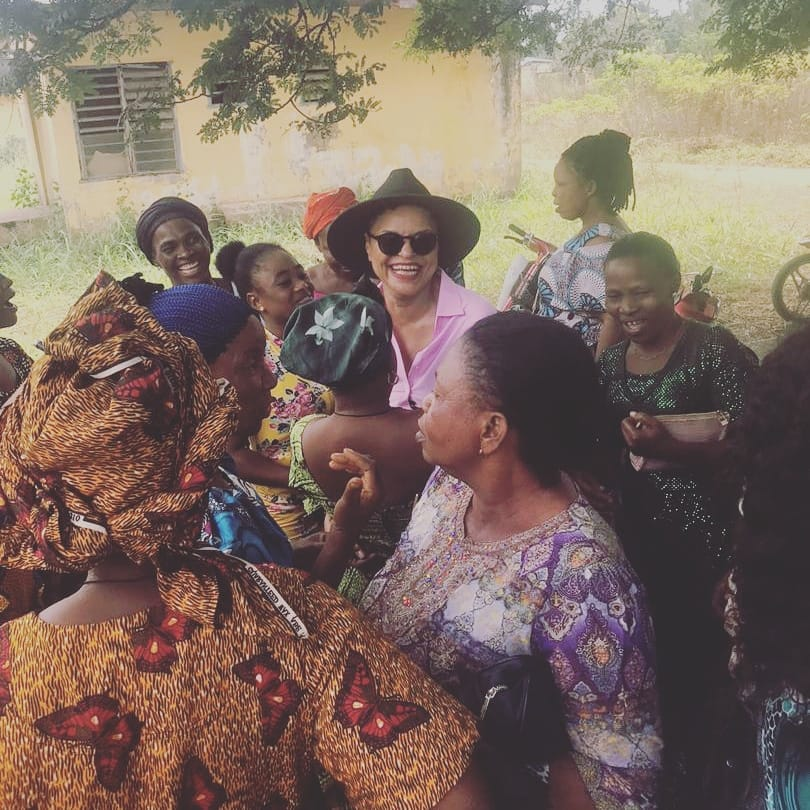

A former chairman of Njaba Local Government Council Imo State and a high-profile community leader and cultural revivalist, Hon Chief Ben Durugbor has concluded plans to establish an institution to preserve the cultural heritage of Umuaka, especially the Oghu cultural festival. Chief Durugbor who is the village head of Umuojukwu Ugbele and an Oghu Elder (Onye Isi Oghu) in Ugbele Akah.

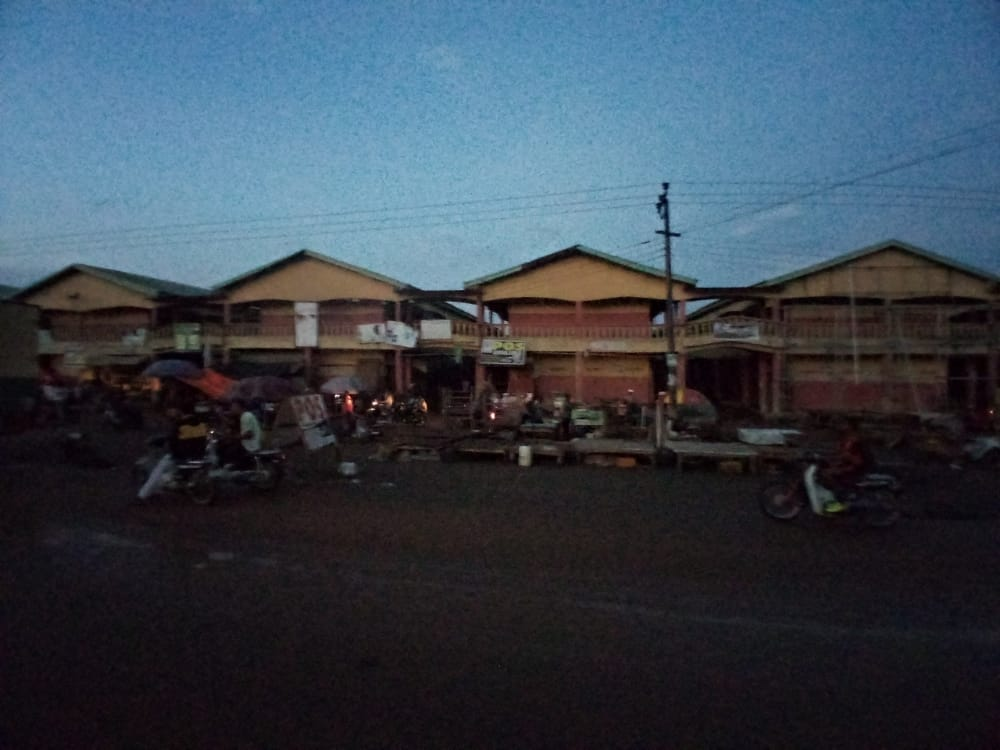
Ime Afo At Dusk
