= Orogwe =

Community in Imo State, Nigeria

Orogwe is a community in Owerri West local government of Imo state in Nigeria.

== History ==
Orogwe is a member of the Umuoha Ofo Ise autonomous community; one of the five sons of the legend Oha in the then Igbo land of eastern Nigeria.

== Culture and landmarks ==
The spoken language is Igbo and the population is predominantly Christian.

The Onitcha-Owerri express road cuts across the community 7 km before the famous control-post roundabout in Owerri Municipal. The community is bounded by the following neighbouring communities; Ndegwu in the west, Ohii in the east, Ogbaku in the north and Irette in the south.

Notable institutional landmarks are Prisima hotel, Graziella hotel, Salvation Army, Eke Orogwe market, the community primary and secondary schools, Protocol IT Academy, St. Mark's Anglican church Orogwe, Chelsea lodge hotel, Orogwe community primary health centre and customary court, and the Okpokija petrol filling station etc.

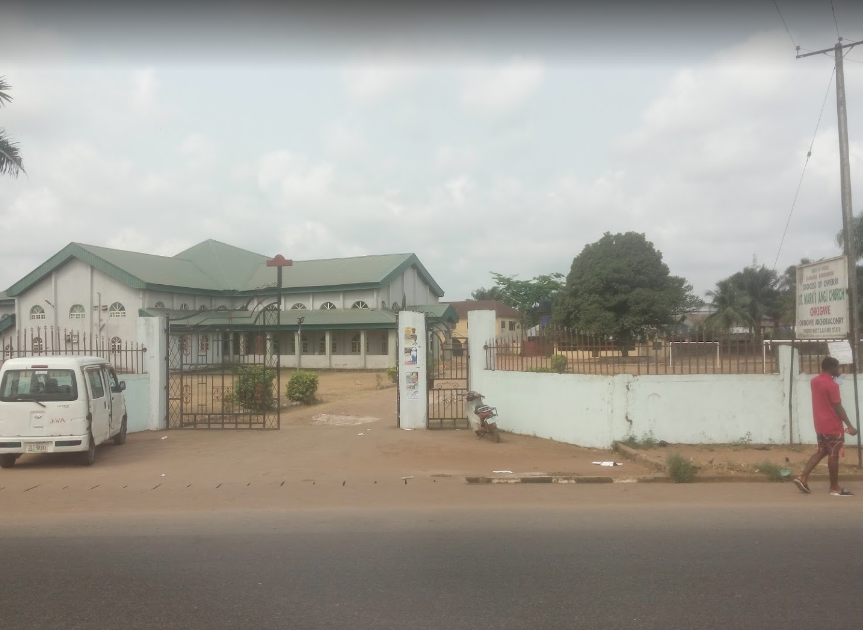

Orogwe is made up of the following village heads; Umueze, Ubah, Umuafom, Umunjanwoke, Amato and Umunnomo. Culturally, they are noted for Uri Opi and Okorosha masquerade dances. The present square for the Okorosha dance group of Amato called Ama Mbutu was a rendezvous where church services used to hold for St Mark's Church before it moved to the Eke Orogwe axis of today.

Orogwe is predominantly a Christian community. Christianity in Orogwe was founded by a returned freed slave named Ojure who was a CMS Missionary from Bonny Island sent by his church to a meeting at Onitsha but recognized his village for which he was subsequently sent to begin Christian activities there from which St Mark's Anglican Church was eventually planted. St Mark's Anglican Church became the mother church for other Anglican churches in Ndegwu, Amakohia-Ubi, Agwa, Akabo, Ejemekwuru, Ogbaku and Oguta.At a time all these Anglican churches were part and parcel of the revered Orogwe Parish of the Anglican Diocese of Owerri.Orogwe Archdeaconry is presently the most senior Archdeaconry of the Anglican Diocese of Owerri. The present Diocese on the Lake Oguta is an extract from the former Orogwe parish or later Orogwe Achdeaconry.

== Economy ==
The locals are predominantly peasant farmers, comprising a population of about 10,000 people. Some of the educated locals have migrated to Nigerian urban cities and overseas for greener pastures and to actualise their career dreams.

== Politics ==
The community is governed by the laws of the federal republic of Nigeria and government of Imo state. The community has a president general at the helm of affairs of the community development union. The current Eze of Orogwe community is Eze Oha II Emma Ike Ejiogu.

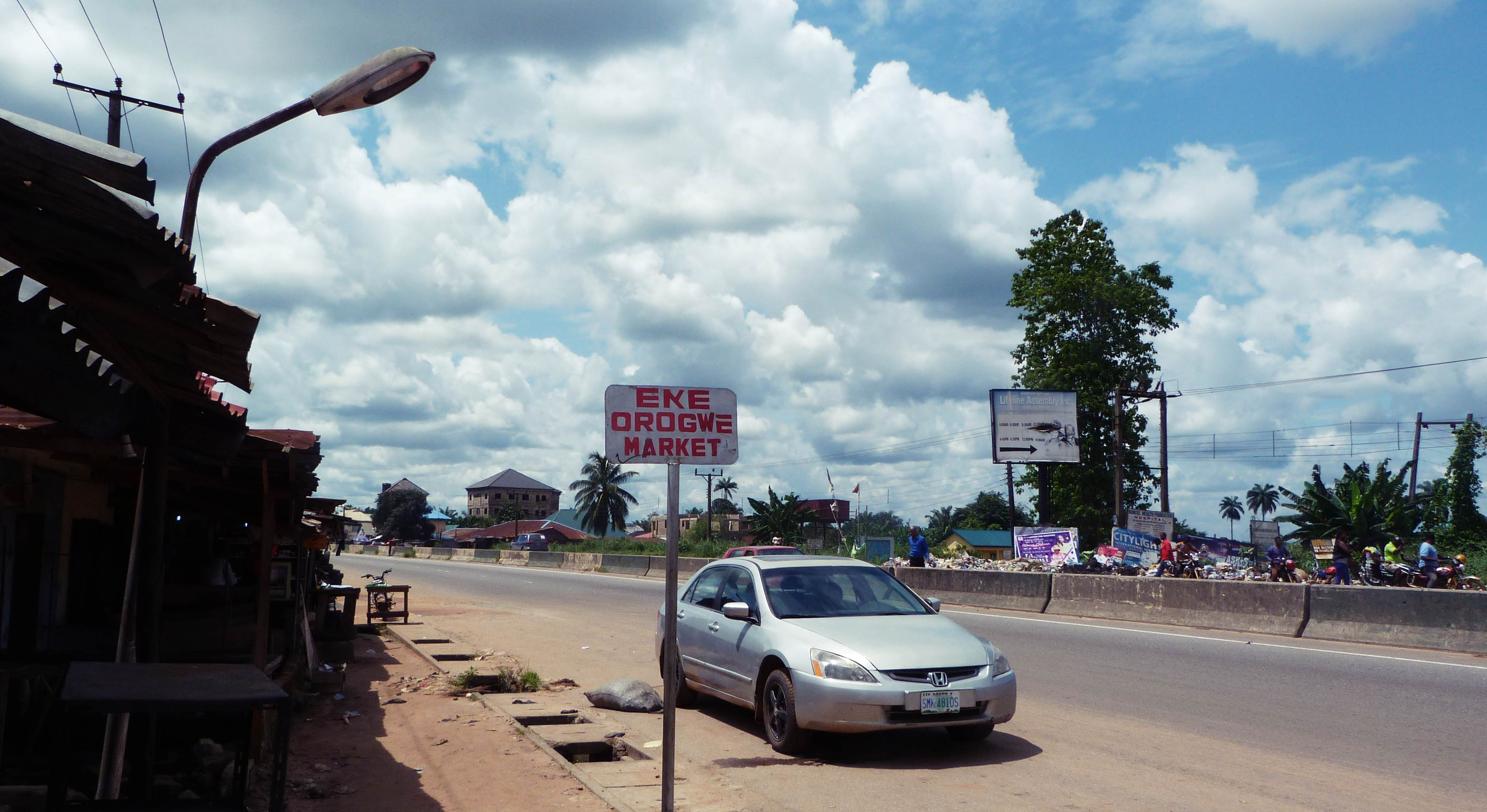
Eke Orogwe market

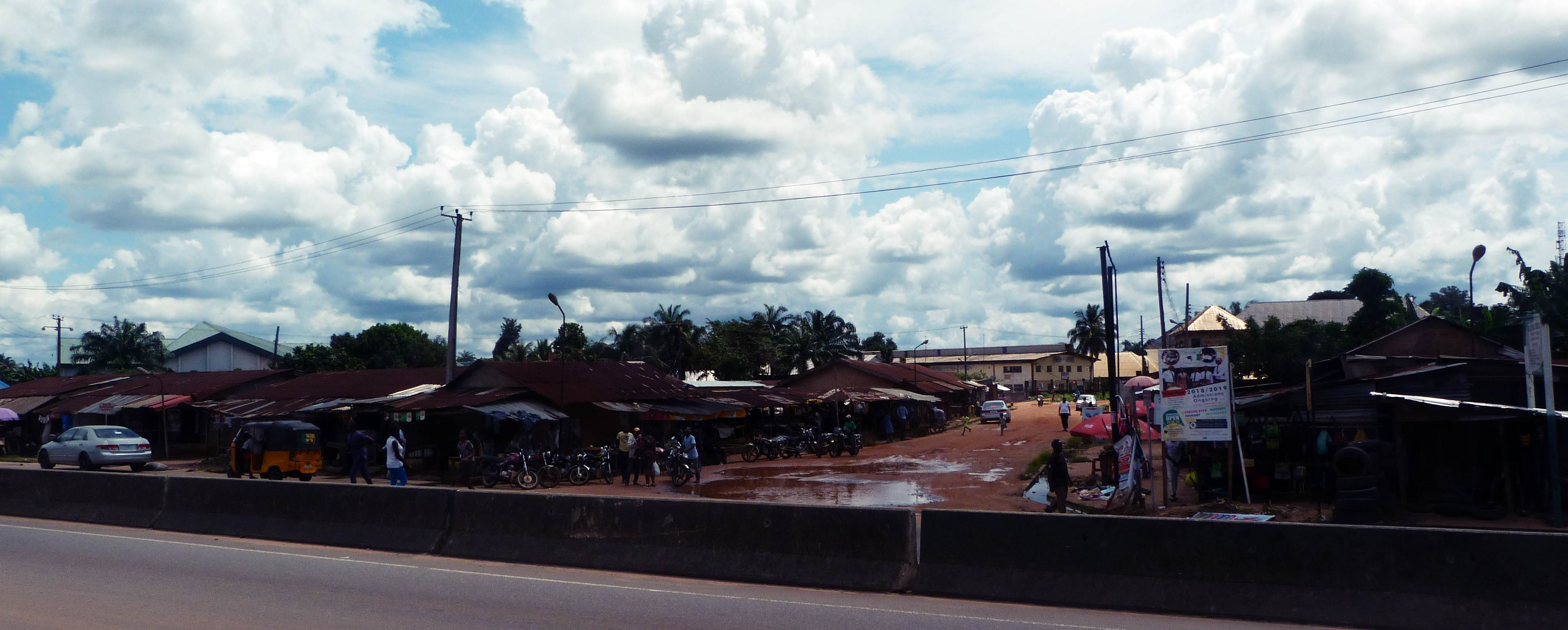
View of Eke Orogwe Market Across the Owerri Onitsha Road

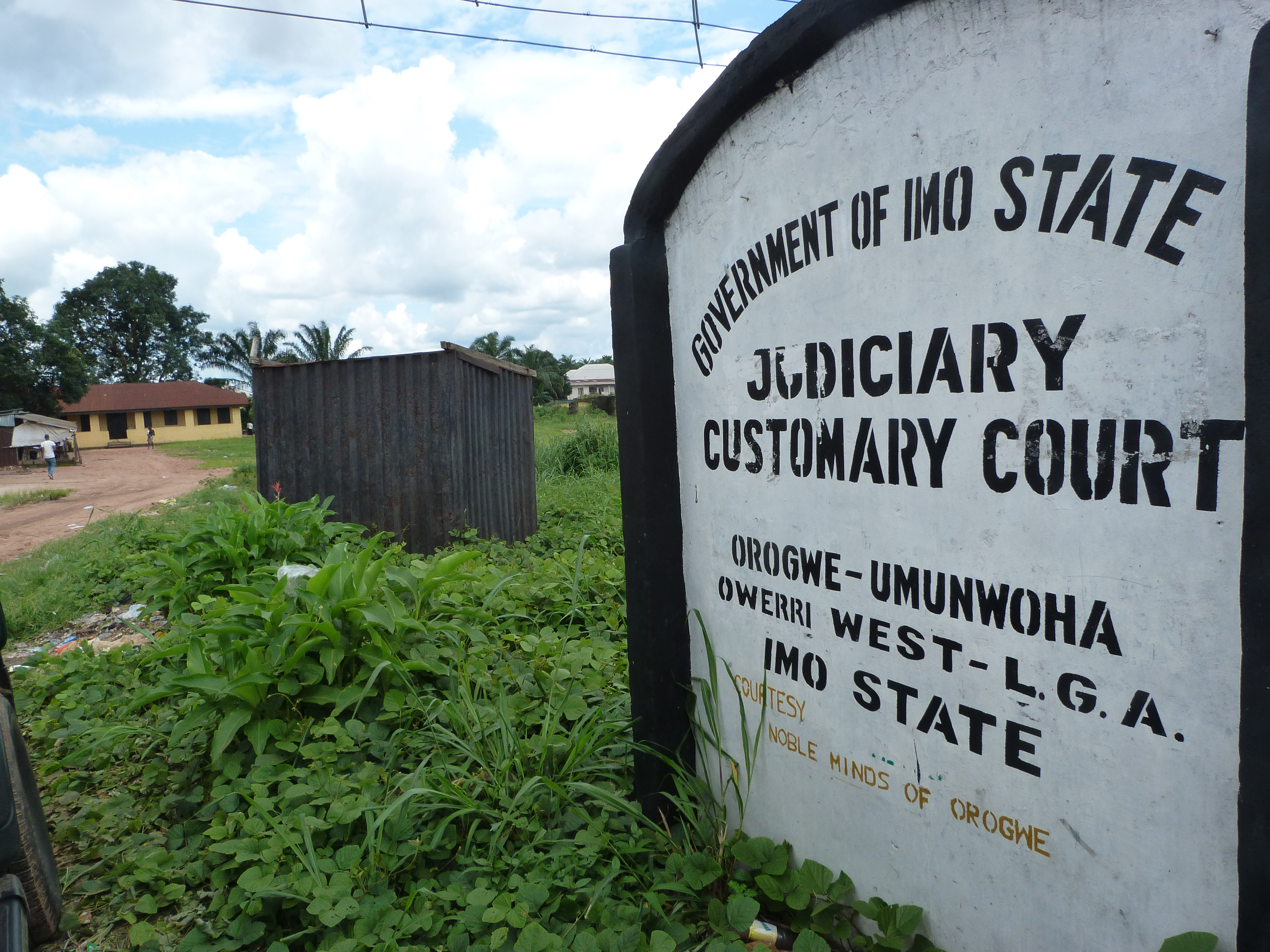
Orogwe Judiciary Court
