= Konga.com =

E-commerce website in Nigeria

Konga
- Company type: Retail, e-commerce
- Available in: English
- Founded: 2012
- Headquarters: Gbagada, Lagos, Nigeria
- Owner: Konga Holdings
- Founder: Sim Shagaya
- Chairperson: Leo Stan Ekeh
- CEO: Nnamdi Ekeh
- Industry: Retail
- Employees: >1000 (January 2020)
- Website: Konga.com
- Launched: 2012

Konga.com is a Nigerian e-commerce company founded in July 2012 with headquarters in Gbagada, Lagos State. It offers a third-party online marketplace as well as first-party direct retail products. The company also has a logistics service (EXPRESS), which enables the timely shipment and delivery of packages to customers.

== History ==
Konga was founded in July 2012 by Sim Shagaya, with a staff of 20 people. The site initially functioned as a Lagos-only online retailer focused on merchandise in the Baby, Beauty, and Personal Care categories, but broadened its scope to all of Nigeria in December 2012 and gradually expanded merchandise categories through 2012 and 2013. This expansion may have been a response to Konga's major competitor, Rocket Internet-backed Jumia, which launched around the same time.

In early 2013, Konga raised a $10 million Series A round from Investment AB Kinnevik and Naspers. In Q2 2013, Konga beta-tested 'Konga Mall,' opening up the Konga platform to third-party retailers and moving away from a pure first-party online retail model. In late 2013, Konga finalized a $25 million Series B round from previous investors, Investment AB Kinnevik and Naspers, the largest single round raised by a single African startup at the time. On November 29, 2013, Konga.com crashed and remained offline for 45 minutes as a result of unprecedented traffic stemming from its Black Friday promotion. Konga sold more during the first six hours of the promotion than it did in the prior month.

Konga officially launched its third-party retail platform in the first half of 2014, rebranding it as 'Marketplace' from 'Konga Mall'; by the end of 2014, Konga's Marketplace featured 8,000 merchants, beating internal targets of 1,000 merchants eight-fold. Konga received US$3.5 million worth of orders during its 2014 Black Friday promotion, compared to US$300,000 during the promotion in the previous year. Despite reports that Naspers acquired 50% of Konga in 2013, publicly traded Naspers disclosed that its stake in Konga after the October 2014 Series C investment was 40.22%. Konga was reportedly valued at approximately $200 million as of the Series C.

Konga announced it acquired the assets and mobile money license of Internet Nigeria Limited in June 2015, thereby meeting the Central Bank of Nigeria's legal requirement for the provision of mobile payment services. The acquisition will support KongaPay, launched in August 2015, which was Konga's solution to facilitate the uptake of cashless electronic payments. With over 80 million mobile internet users in Nigeria, Konga has made online payment easy with its delivery payment option embraced by its numerous users.

== Types of services ==
=== KongaPay ===
KongaPay was launched as a pilot product in 2015 in partnership with Nigerian commercial banks to work for customers only within Konga.com's platform.

The challenge of lack of trust in making online payments was quenched by KongaPay which has made it possible for anyone to use Konga's online platform. This innovation had protected online shoppers against reports of fraud when they release their bank details online. KongaPay is similar to what is seen in Amazon platform with its one-click payments. It was unveiled in Lagos, Nigeria at a KongaPay Demo event. The payment option has been fully integrated with Ecobank, Access Bank, FCMB, Diamond Bank, Zenith Bank, Heritage Bank, UBA, First Bank, and GTB.

According to Sim Shagaya, KongaPay is a partnership with Nigeria's banks. We strongly believe that together, we could change the face of online shopping in Nigeria by removing the uncertainties customers associate with pre-paying for goods and services they are yet to receive.”

KongaPay has become a prominent site in online shopping in Nigeria. This is because it has made it possible for easier movement of goods, services, and payments. This has grown safety and trust among Konga's users.

With KongaPay, a customer receives an authorization code that is secured and registered to the mobile phone number on the website. There is no need for customers to sign up for electronic banking if they customer has a registered mobile phone number and a bank account. KongaPay has eliminated the use of sensitive personal information such as Internet banking passwords or card details with just a click.

=== Konga Express ===
To make its online integration very effective, Konga introduced Konga Express which focuses on selling its products to reach the buyer with every available means. Customers can have their ordered products get to them within 1–3 days. Konga Express fulfills the orders that are made daily with online tracking.

=== Konga Marketplace ===
Konga started its expansion in Nigeria with Konga Mall, which is a revolutionary option that allows businesses in Nigeria to showcase their products online. Business owners were offered a free and simple delivery service. The business owner packages an order that is accompanied by SellerHQ details and details of the order before dropping the parcel at Konga's dropoff center.

After the success of Konga Mall, Konga introduced Konga Marketplace, which made it possible for sellers to be involved from any part of the country. Affiliate marketing and comparison online stores, such as bestprices, have also become possible with this marketplace.

=== Konga Self-Fulfill Model ===
Self-Fulfill Model made it possible for its merchants to have shipping agreements negotiated by Konga with reputable courier partners. The sellers control the management of their parcels from the point of order till the customers receive them. Payments are made directly to the sellers from the buyers when they receive their parcels. Buyers expect flexible and faster delivery of their parcels through the Self-Fulfill Model. Self-Fulfill Model has the option of allowing customers to rate sellers, products, and overall experience.

== Zinox acquisition ==
Two months after laying off over half of its staff, Konga was acquired by Zinox, a Nigerian firm that manufactures and distributes computers. In March 2018, the company appointed Olusiji Ijogun, former UAC Foods and Unilever executive as its chairman. Later that month, Shola Adekoya, resigned from his role as Konga CEO to be replaced by Nick Imudia, the immediate past Regional Director TCL/Alcatel and Prince Nnamdi Ekeh the Founder of Yudala.

On 1 May 2018, Zinox merged Konga with its emerging retail outfit, Yudala, maintaining the Konga brand name, to become a major e-commerce & retail company in Africa.

== Awards ==
- #1 - The Top 100 Companies For Nigerian Millennials (2015)
- E-Commerce Provider of the Year, Kalahari Awards (2015)
- #1 - Top Startups in Nigeria (2015)
- #2 - Most Innovative Companies of 2015 in Africa - Fast Company (2015)
- #12 - Most Respected Companies in Nigeria (2014)
- Online Retailer of the Year - Marketing World Awards (2014)
- Best Use of Social Media in Marketing - Marketing World Awards (2014)
- Most Innovative and Impactful Brand in the Retail Trade Sector - The Lagos Chamber of Commerce and Industry (2014)
- #5 - Most Innovative Companies of 2014 in Africa - Fast Company (2014)
- Online Retailer of the Year - Marketing World Awards (2013)
- Best Emerging Brand Of The Year - Marketing World Awards (2013)
