= Miva Open University =

Online university

- Type: Online Private
- Established: 2023; 3 years ago
- Chancellor: Sim Shagaya
- Vice-Chancellor: Prof. Tayo Arulogun
- Location: Abuja, Nigeria
- Website: miva.edu.ng

Miva Open University is a private online university in Nigeria that was established by uLesson in 2023, with its primary campus in Abuja.

== History ==
Miva Open University was initially established on 10 March 2023 by The uLesson Group, a Nigeria edtech company operating in four other West African countries. On 15 May 2023, Miva received its license from the NUC, and the university became a registered entity of the National Universities Commission, as a springboard for distance learning in Nigeria. On 25 May 2023, the university began admission and offered eight disciplines from two faculties.

The university runs various courses under schools/faculties such as Computer Science, Cyber Security, Data Science, Software Engineering, Public Health, Nursing Science, Accounting, Economics, Entrepreneurship, Information Technology, Criminology & Security Studies, Mass Communication, Business Management, and Public Policy and Administration.

Miva also launched its Master of Business Administration (MBA) programme on the 2nd of April, 2024 and its Master of Public Administration on the 7th of October 2024. On the 7th of February 2025, the National Universities Commission (NUC) approved two new postgraduate programmes - Master of Public Health (MPH) and Master of Information Technology (MIT) to be offered by Miva Open University from the 2024/2025 academic session.

In April, 2026, Miva Open University received full accreditation from the National Universities Commission (NUC) for twelve of its programmes. Miva Open University also expanded its academic offerings with the introduction of new undergraduate and postgraduate programmes.

The new undergraduate programmes include Artificial Intelligence, Community Health Science, Environmental Health Science, Early Childhood Education, and Primary Education.

The new postgraduate programmes include Master of Criminology and Security Management, Master of Supply Chain Management, Master of International and Sustainable Development, and the Doctor of Business Administration.
