= Parallex Bank =

Nigerian commercial bank

Parallex Bank Limited
- Formerly: Parallex MicroFinance Bank
- Type: Private Company
- Industry: Finance
- Genre: Banking
- Founded: May 2008; 18 years ago
- Headquarters: 1261 Adeola Hopewell St, Victoria Island, Lagos, 106104 Lagos State, Nigeria
- Area served: Nigeria
- Key people: Adeola Phillips[ Chairman Femi Bakre; Managing Director
- Services: Banking
- Website: parallexbank.com

Parallex Bank Limited is a Nigerian financial services provider that operates as a licensed commercial bank, regulated by the Central Bank of Nigeria, the country's central bank and national banking regulator. In December 2023, Parallex Bank was awarded Reputable Bank of the Year by the Global Reputation Forum in UK for being the first bank and only bank to transit from being a Microfinance to being a Commercial Bank in Nigeria.

== History ==
=== 2008 - 2009 ===
Parallex Bank, previously called Parallex Microfinance Bank, was first incorporated in May 2008, and began as a Microfinance Bank. Femi Otenigagbe held the office of MD/CEO from inception till 2009.

=== 2009 - 2013 ===
By March 2012, Parallex Microfinance Bank upgraded from a Unit to a state Microfinance Bank, and by October 2013, it was licensed by the Central Bank of Nigeria to operate at National level, becoming one of the ten National Microfiance Banks in Nigeria in 20 months of operation.

=== 2013 - 2021 ===
After operating for ten years, Parallex Microfinance Bank applied for a Commercial Banking License and by November, received an Approval in Principle for conversion from a MicroFinance to a Commercial Bank. By January 2021, Parallex Microfinance Bank was granted a Commercial Banking Regional operating license to operate as Parallex Bank Limited. As at the time of Parallex Bank's transitioning, it left behind 875 Microfinance Banks in Nigeria, out of which 9 have national licenses, 98 operate at state level, and 768 operate as Unit Microfinance Banks. In 2021, Mr. Femi Bakre was appointed as managing director of Parallex Bank.

== Awards and Recognitions ==
YEAR AWARDED	RECOGNITION	AWARDS
2015	2015 Best Internet bank	Nigerian Banking Tech Awards
2015	Best Technology bank	Nigerian Banking Tech Awards
2022	Most outstanding young commercial bank in Nigeria	Marketing Edge Awards and Summit
2022	Challenger Bank of the Year	BusinessDay Banks and Other Financial Institutions Awards
2023	Most Innovative Bank 2022	Champion Newspapers
2023	Regional Bank of the Year 2022	National Daily Newspapers

== Entertainment ==
In 2022, Parallex Bank introduced and sponsored a new category of Awards at the Headies, 'The Humanitarian Award' where the winner receives 10 million naira for donation to charity along with a headies plaque.

== Sports Activities ==
Lagos State government partnered Parallex bank to improve the payment solutions for its athletes in August 2024.

== See also ==
- List of banks in Nigeria
