= Leo Stan Ekeh =

Nigerian businessman

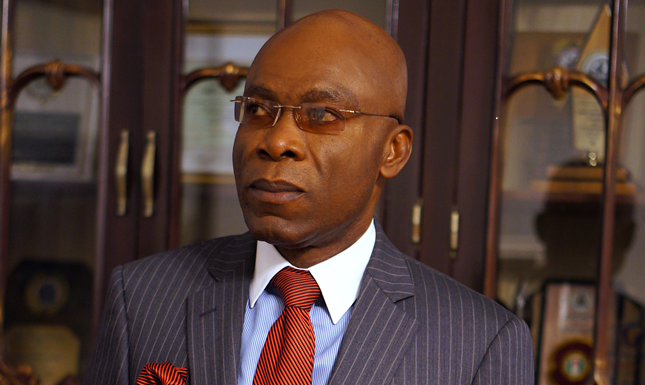
- Leo Stan Ekeh
- Born: Leonard Stanley Nnamdi Ekeh; 22 February 1956 (age 70); Ubomiri Mbaitoli, Imo State, Nigeria
- Occupations: Founder, Chairman and CEO of Zinox Technologies; Chairman of Konga Group
- Spouse: Chioma Ekeh (m. 1986)
- Children: 5
- Parent: Ihentuge Ekeh

Leonard Stanley Nnamdi Ekeh (born 22 February 1956, in Imo State, Nigeria) is a Nigerian businessman. He is the founder and chairman of Zinox Group. He is also the chairman of Konga.com.

== Early life ==
Leo Stan Ekeh was born on 22 February 1956 in Ubomiri, Mbaitoli Local Government Area, Imo State, Nigeria. He grew up in a middle-class family with three brothers and two sisters. His mother worked as a dietitian, while his father was a nurse, and both played a significant role in shaping his values and work ethic.

For his secondary education, he attended Holy Ghost College, Owerri. As a young boy, his ambition was not to work in technology—he dreamed of owning Nigeria's largest transport company.

After secondary school, he traveled to India, where he earned a Bachelor of Science (B.Sc.) in Economics from Punjab University. He has often described his time in India as a turning point because it exposed him to a practical, fast-growing economy that changed his outlook on business. He later obtained an MSc in Risk Management from the University of Nottingham in the United Kingdom.

These early experiences laid the foundation for his later success as the founder of Zinox Group, one of Nigeria's leading ICT companies, and as a key figure in the country's technology industry. .

== Education ==
Ekeh attended Holy Ghost College, Owerri for his secondary education. During his early years, he wanted to own the biggest transport company in Nigeria.

He later went to India for his university education, where he received a Bachelor of Science degree in Economics from Punjab University. Ekeh believes that studying in India was “a great turning point in my life because I found the economy of India a realistic economy”. Ekeh also earned an MSc in Risk Management from the University of Nottingham.

== Business career ==
Leo Stan Ekeh started Zinox Technologies Limited in 2001 to manufacture computers. He ensured that at launch Zinox Computers already had the WHQL certification, the first in sub-Saharan Africa, consolidated 5 years later with the attainment of the NIS ISO 2000: 9001 QMS Certification. In October 2013, the company announced the production of its computer tablet line named Zipad. In February 2018, Ekeh's company Zinox acquired Konga.com from its owners buying 99% of the total company shares.
