= Amakohia Ubi =

Autonomous community in Imo State, Nigeria

- Autonomous community
- Interactive map of Amakohia Ubi
- Coordinates: 5°32′34.27″N 6°57′4.9″E
- Country: Nigeria
- State: Imo
- Local government area: Owerri
- Time zone: UTC+1 (WAT)

Amakọhia-Ubi is an autonomous community in the Owerri West Local Government area of Imo State (1), Nigeria. The community is divided into four villages: Umunjam, Obiọkwu, Umuike, and Umuọka. Each of these villages, which later became towns, has between four and eight kindreds. Amakọhia-Ubi, originally, Amakọhia-Ubi was a village in the Umunwọha Ọfọ Ise (Children of Nwọha) community comprising Ohii, Amakohia-Ubi, Ndegwu, Orogwe, and Irete in order of seniority, until each of them was recognized as autonomous by the Peoples Democratic Party-led government. Each of these officially known as an autonomous community was granted the right to choose a traditional ruler according to government procedures establishing the autonomous community status.

All of these communities and villages are located within Owerri-West local government area. Politically, Amakọhia-Ubi has 19 Polling units as accounted for by the independent national electoral commission during the 2023 election.

These autonomous communities and villages are host to functioning health care facilities (NBS, 2007, |url=https://nairametrics.com/wp-content/uploads/2011/10/DIRECTORY-OF-HEALTH-ESTABLISHMENT.pdf )
