= Kiliwi Nwachukwu =

Nigerian fighter

- Born: Uzoma Nwaozuzu Nwachukwu; 1929; Mbaitolu, Imo state
- Died: 1992 (aged 60–61)

Uzoma Nwaozuzu Nwachukwu commonly known as Kiliwi Nwachukwu, Killiwi Nwachukwu or Killiwe Nwachukwu was a Nigerian fighter of Igbo descent. Although there are speculation that he is a myth. He was considered the Nigerian version of Superman. With his raw strength, he broke coconuts on his head, lifted cars with his hands, and could carry up to 10 adult men on his shoulders. he displayed his skills in different schools as a show and was widely regarded as the strongest man in Africa.

== Life ==
Nwachukwu was born in 1931 in Mbaitolu in today's Imo state. He was known for his enormous strength which earned him the name "Killi-we". He married six wives and died on 30 October 1992.
