= Ogbaku, Imo State =

Town in Imo State, Nigeria

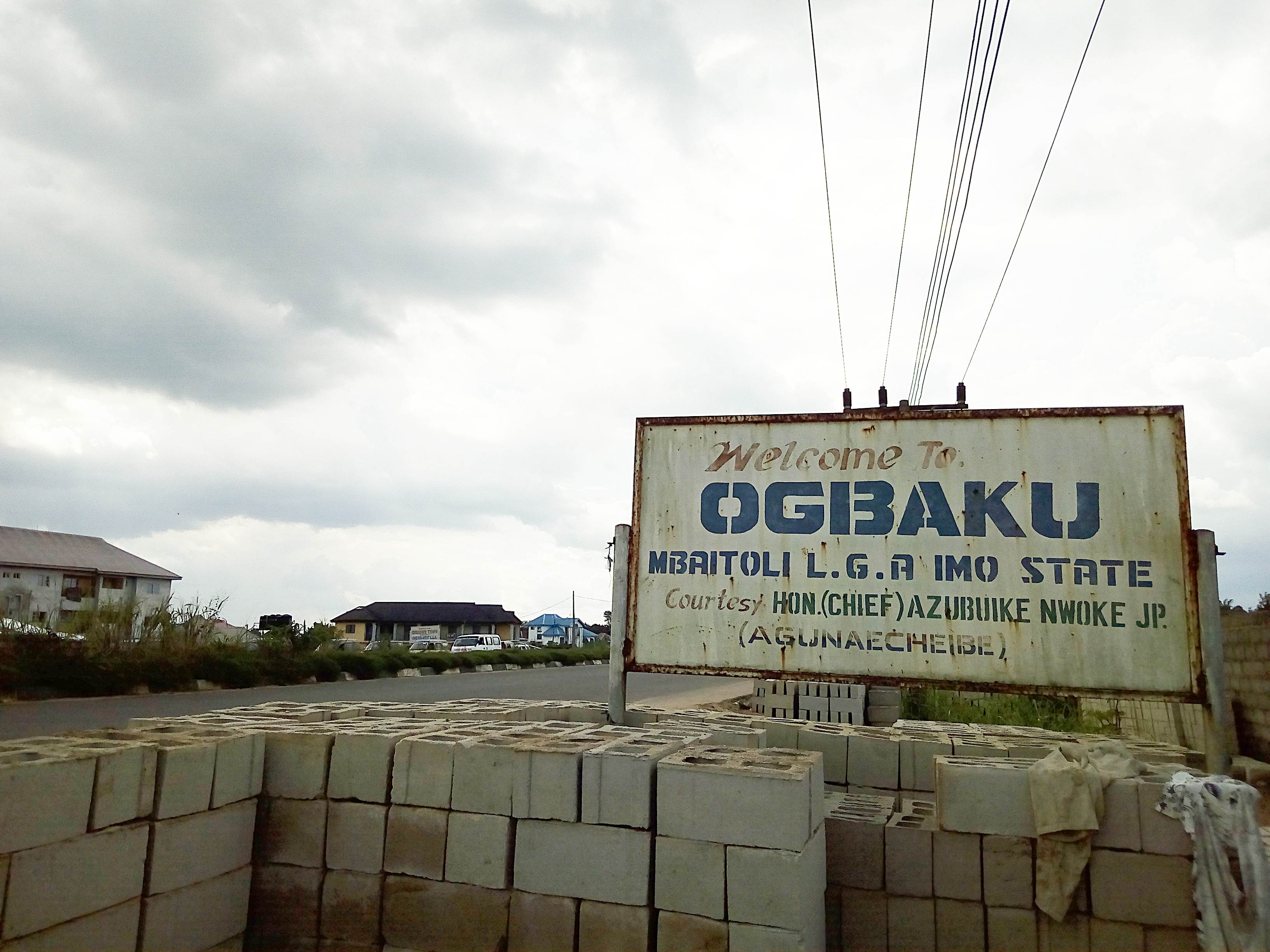
Ogbaku

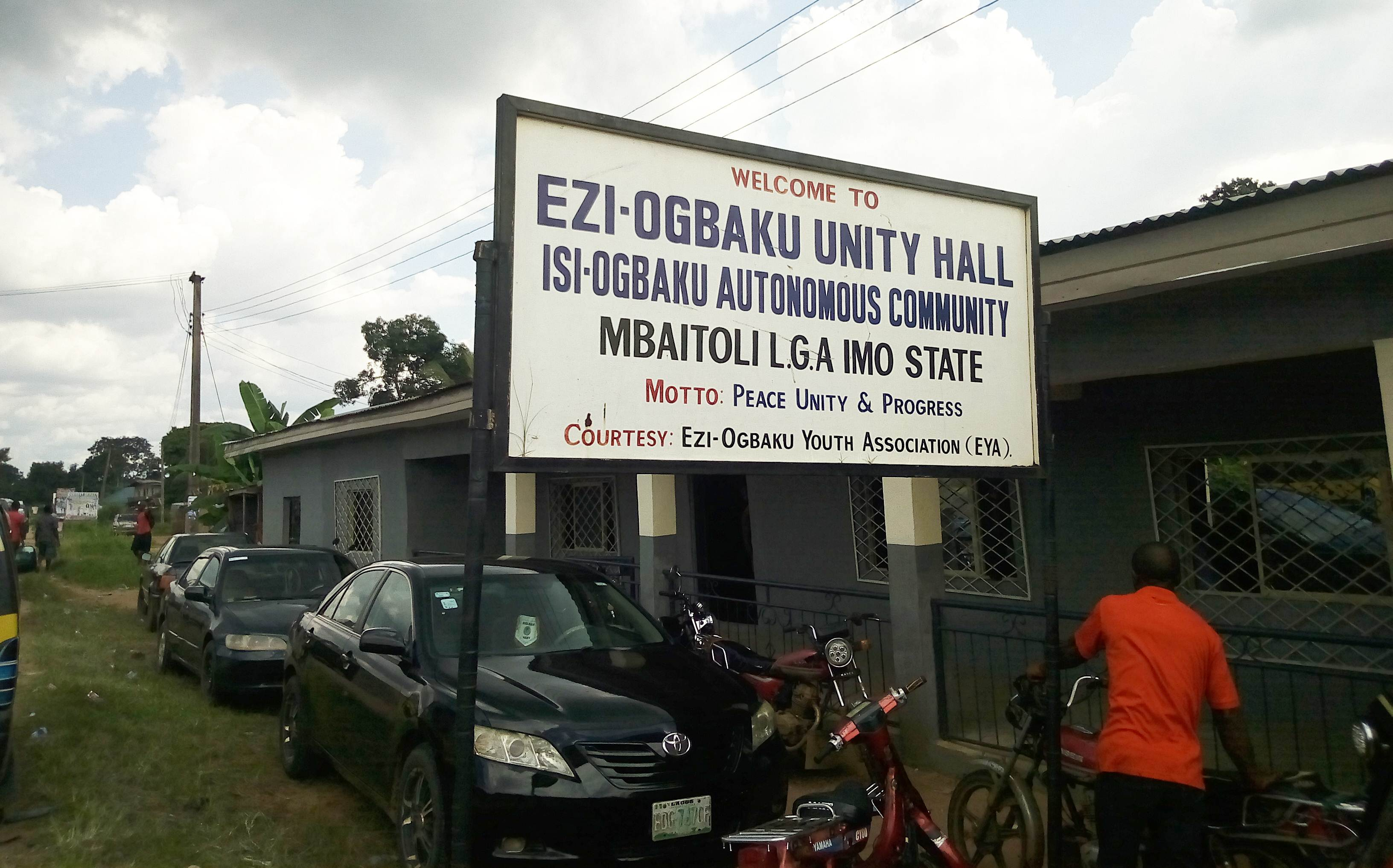
Community hall ogbaku

Ogbaku is a town made up of nine (9) villages, while some kindred are more pronounced, others are not publicly known in Mbaitoli Local Government Area of Imo state, South Eastern Nigeria. Its villages includes: Nsokpo, Ezi Ogbaku, Umuaku, Ogbuke, Uzele, Okwu, Lawa, Umuekpu, Obibi. The eldest is Ezi-Ogbaku, followed by Lawa, Umuekpu, Nsokpo with Umudogu, Umuonyeashi, Umunomo and Umukabiri as its kindreds. Umueze, Amaegbu, Umugama, Umuokwere, Umuawaka are kindreds in Okwu. Combining villages and popular kindreds are the errors that has led to mention of Ogbaku being a town with 18 villages. It is situated along Onitsha-Owerri road. It is about 12 km to the capital city of Owerri. It is one of the members of the Isu dialect bordering Owerri. They maintain cultural relations with the Isu dialect and are a part of the general Isu people.

The town has an ancestral lineage from the Umuokparakatu royal family, of Umudogu, Nsokpo, headed by the Azubiendu household and its direct descendants. Although, the town practices elective monarchy since the influence of colonialism, giving room for any member of the town to become its cultural leader.

There is a cottage Hospital that hosts a wing of Imo State University Teaching Hospital and a postal agency. The town has pipeborne water and is connected to the national grid for electricity supply.

OGBAKU, IMO. BASIC FACTS ABOUT THIS COMMUNITY
