= Orodo =

Igbo community in Nigeria

Orodo is an Igbo community in Mbaitoli local government area of Imo State, Nigeria. It is situated between Owerri city and Orlu town. Orodo has borders with Ogwa, Mbieri, Afara, Ifakala, Umuaka, Amurie Omanze and Amandugba. Also, the current Mbaitoli Local Government Headquarters is significantly located at a part of Orodo called Ofekata. The community said to have seven road junction, in the center of the community called nkwo-orodo. The roads are: Ubaha-Eze road, Ahaba road, Amaukwu road, Umuonyahu road, Amaku road, Ofekata road and Eziama road.

== Communities ==
The Nine Communities that Makes up Orodo are namely:

1. Okwu Orodo
2. Ofekata
3. Odunmara
4. Amaukwu
5. Ahaba
6. Ubaha
7. Umunyahu
8. Amaku
9. Eziama

The advent of Autonomous Communities recognized by the State Government saw to the creation of 5 Autonomous Communities from the mother Orodo Ancient Kingdom. The five Autonomous Communities are;

1. Isi-Orodo (Okwu, Umunyahu, Amaku)
2. Obi-Orodo (Odunmara, Ahaba, Eziama)
3. Ofekata Orodo
4. Amaukwu Orodo
5. Ubahaeze Orodo

== Education ==
For their primary education, locals attend the Odunmara Community School Obi Orodo, which is a public school while the Orodo Secondary Technical School provides formal education at the secondary level.

The eight other communities also parade their own primary schools, located at the center of each of the communities.

Since the advent of private owned schools, Orodo town has gotten its fair share of both church owned and private owned schools such as Stella Maris School, Fransica International School, Good Morning Schools, Shamma international college and many more.

Orodo town also prides herself as the host of a specialized school, the Secondary School for the Deaf and Dumb Orodo, the only one in Imo State.
