= Mbaitoli =

- LGA
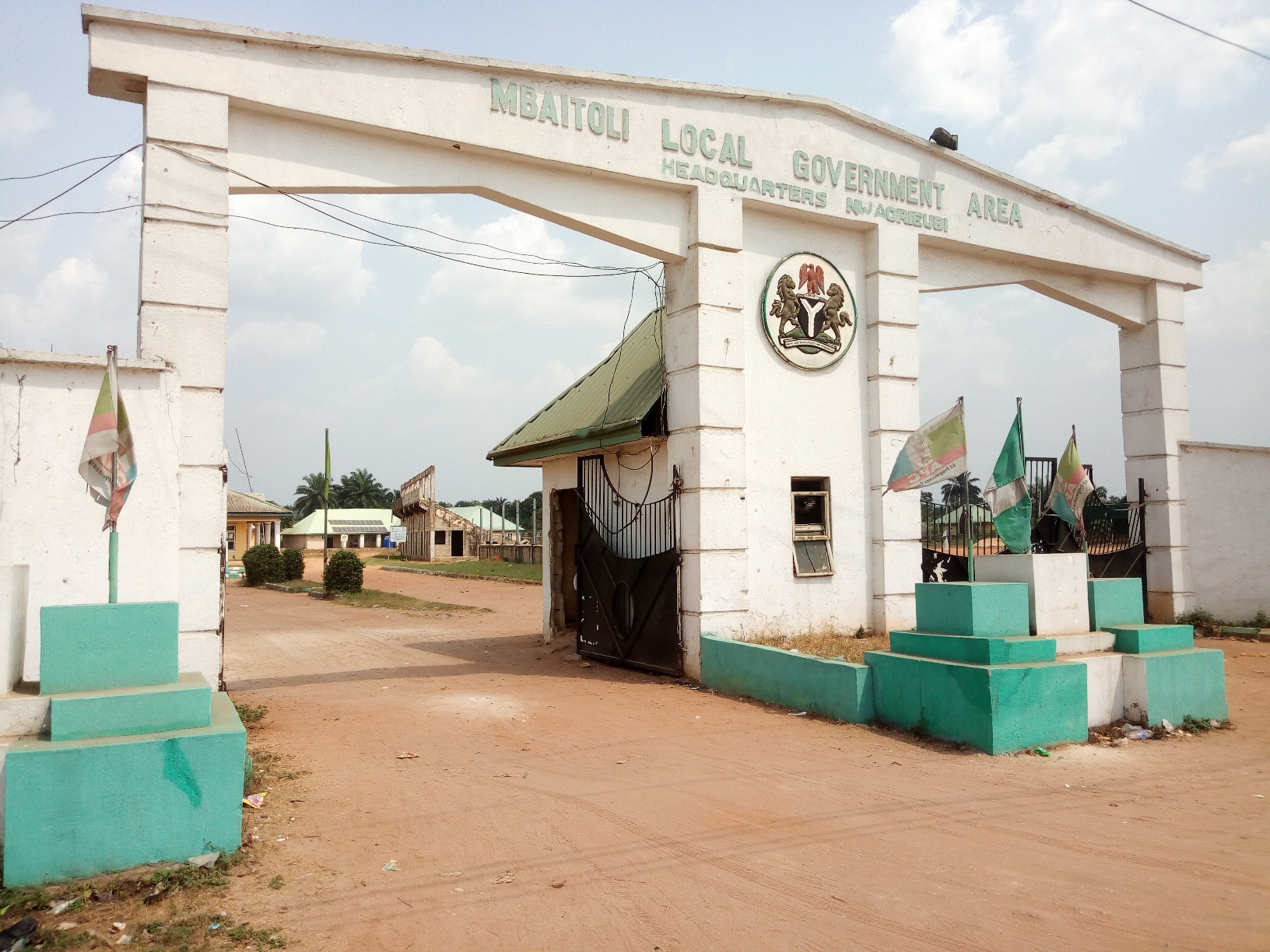
- Entrance of Mbaitoli Local Government Area, Imo State
- Interactive map of Mbaitoli
- Location within Nigeria
- Coordinates: 5°35′16″N 7°3′0″E
- Country: Nigeria
- State: Imo State
- Capital: Nwaorieubi

Government
  - Local Government Chairman: Ifunanya Nwanegwo

Area
  - Total: 204 km^{2} (79 sq mi)

Population (2006)
  - Total: 237,555
  - Density: 1,160/km^{2} (3,020/sq mi)
- Time zone: UTC+1 (WAT)
- Postal code: 461

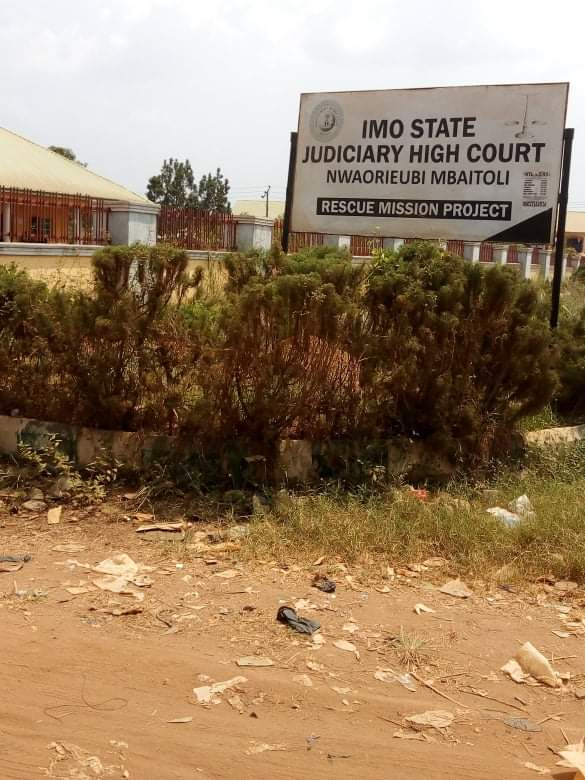
Judiciary High Court of Mbaitoli Local Government Area

Mbaitoli is a Local Government Area of Imo State, Nigeria. Its headquarters are in the town of Nwaorieubi (or Nworieubi). It has an area of 204 km^{2} (79 sq mi) and a population of 327,000. The postal code of the area is 461. Mbaitoli is divided into 9 towns with over 20 autonomous communities with Mbieri as the most populated with 12 INEC wards. The principal occupations of these communities are farming and handicrafts.

== Culture and festivals ==
Most of its festivals like the Mmanwu festival and Okorosha festival are held during the December holidays. Many towns and villages are also involved and participate in Oghu festival. Akata Afara is one village in Afara that participate in Ekeleke cultural festival.

Ekeleke Dancing Group which is performed by Umuomezume kindred Ofekata, Orodo on every Eke day starting from April to first week of June.

== Communities and villages ==
- Ifakala
- Mbieri
- Ubomiri
- Ogbaku
- Eziama-Obiato
- Umunoha
- Orodo
- Afara
- Ogwa

== Notable people ==
- Osita Iheme — actor
- Kiliwi Nwachukwu — Nigerian fighter
- Saint Obi — actor
- Leo Stan Ekeh — Nigerian businessman
