= 1951 =

1951 in various calendars
- Gregorian calendar: 1951; MCMLI
- Ab urbe condita: 2704
- Armenian calendar: 1400; ԹՎ ՌՆ
- Assyrian calendar: 6701
- Baháʼí calendar: 107–108
- Balinese saka calendar: 1872–1873
- Bengali calendar: 1357–1358
- Berber calendar: 2901
- British Regnal year: 15 Geo. 6 – 16 Geo. 6
- Buddhist calendar: 2495
- Burmese calendar: 1313
- Byzantine calendar: 7459–7460
- Chinese calendar: 庚寅年 (Metal Tiger); 4648 or 4441 — to — 辛卯年 (Metal Rabbit); 4649 or 4442
- Coptic calendar: 1667–1668
- Discordian calendar: 3117
- Ethiopian calendar: 1943–1944
- Hebrew calendar: 5711–5712
- Hindu calendars
- Vikram Samvat: 2007–2008
- Shaka Samvat: 1872–1873
- Kali Yuga: 5051–5052
- Holocene calendar: 11951
- Igbo calendar: 951–952
- Iranian calendar: 1329–1330
- Islamic calendar: 1370–1371
- Japanese calendar: Shōwa 26 (昭和２６年)
- Javanese calendar: 1882–1883
- Juche calendar: 40
- Julian calendar: Gregorian minus 13 days
- Korean calendar: 4284
- Minguo calendar: ROC 40 民國40年
- Nanakshahi calendar: 483
- Thai solar calendar: 2494
- Tibetan calendar: ལྕགས་ཕོ་སྟག་ལོ་ (male Iron-Tiger); 2077 or 1696 or 924 — to — ལྕགས་མོ་ཡོས་ལོ་ (female Iron-Hare); 2078 or 1697 or 925

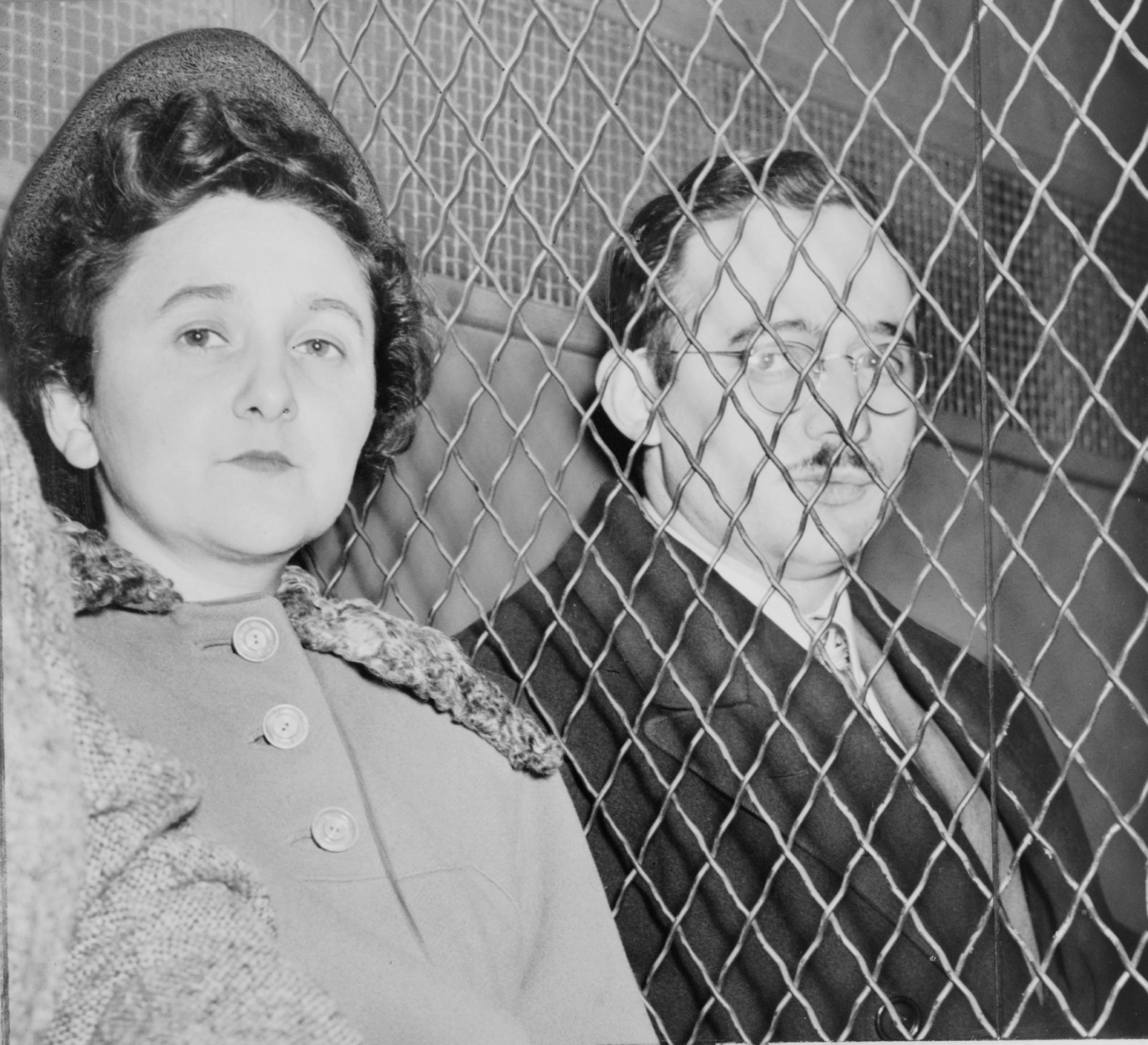
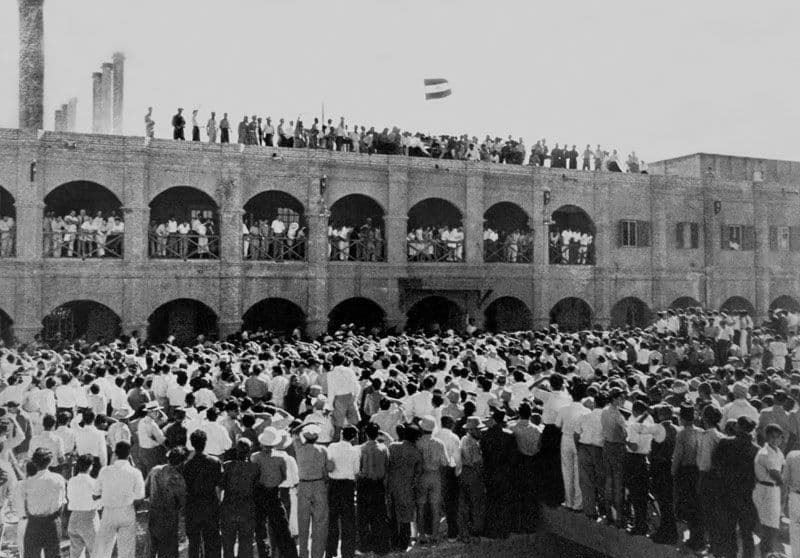
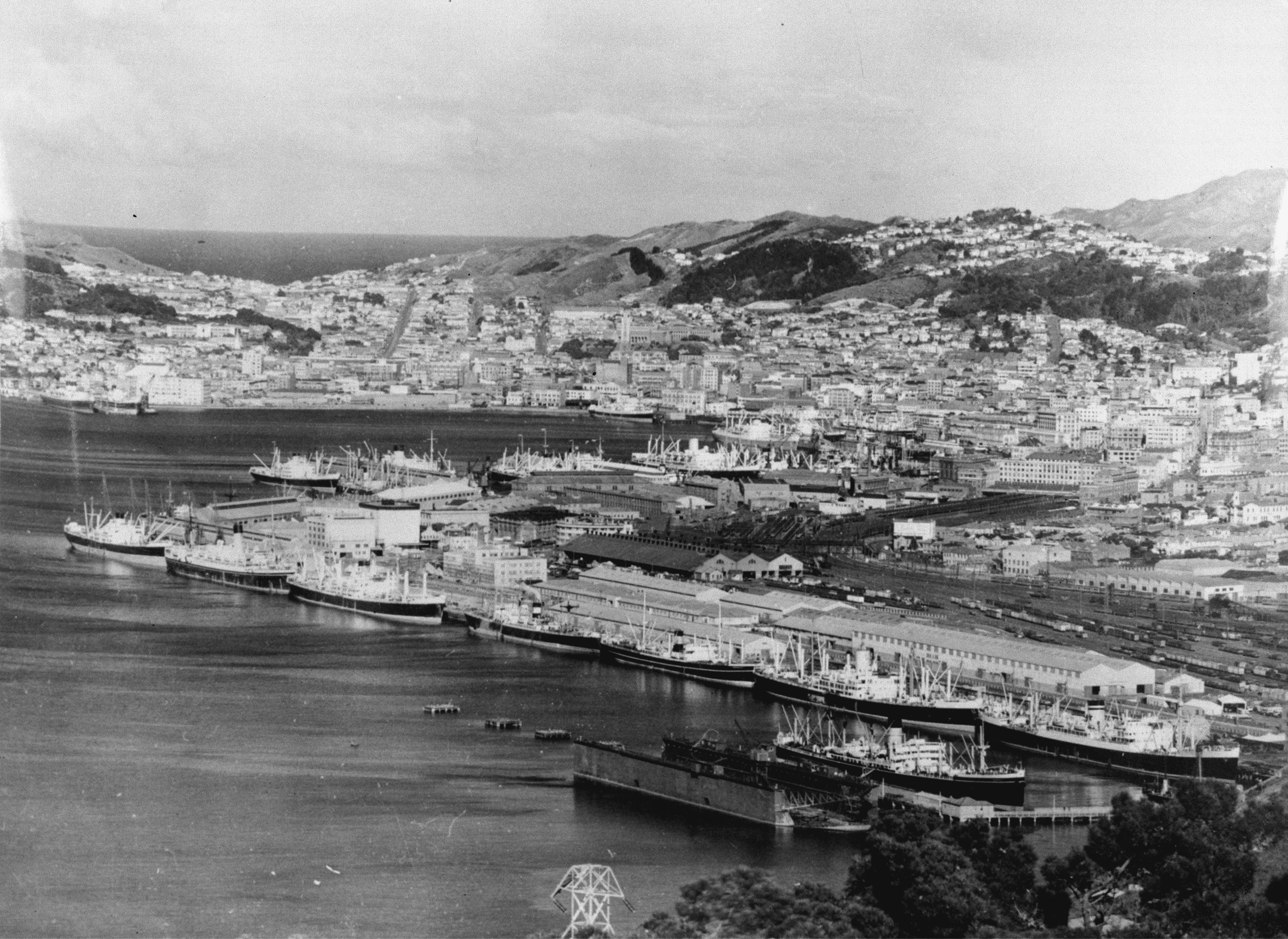
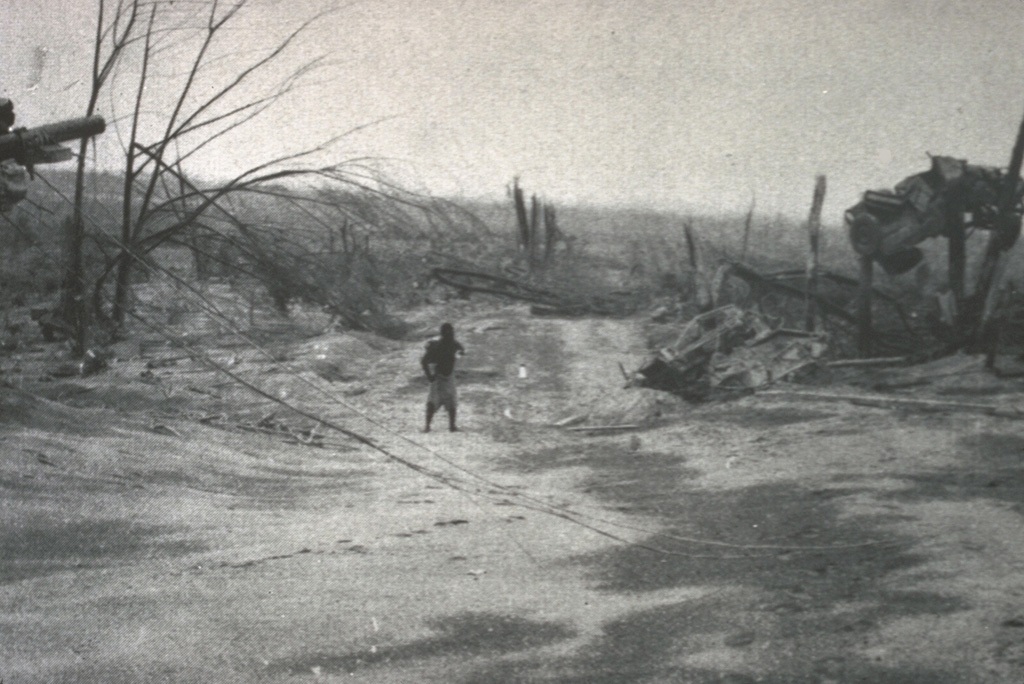
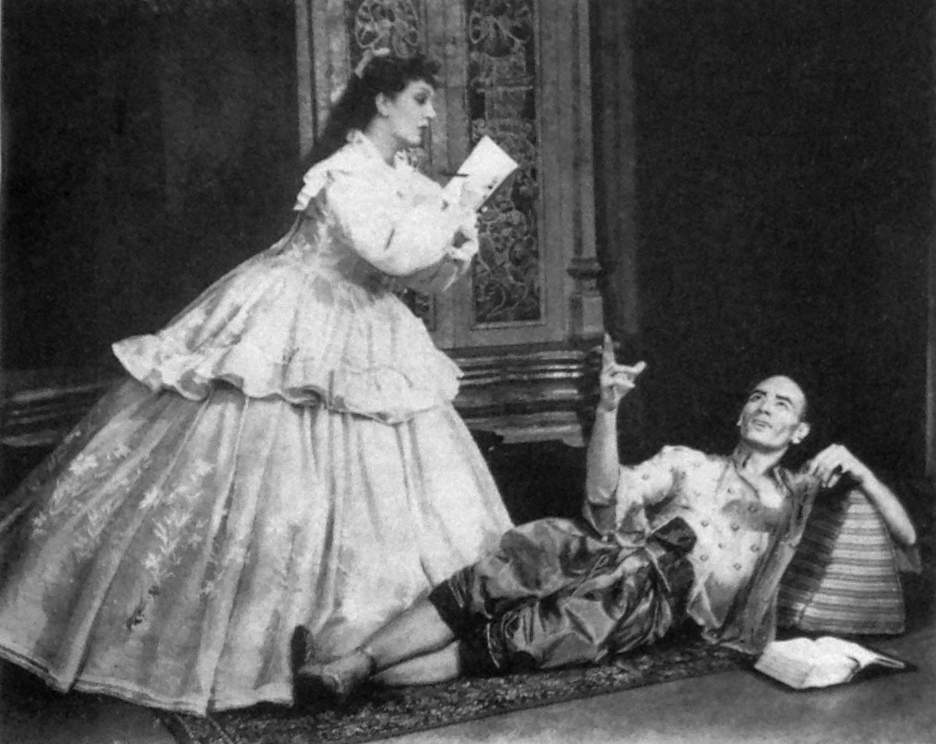
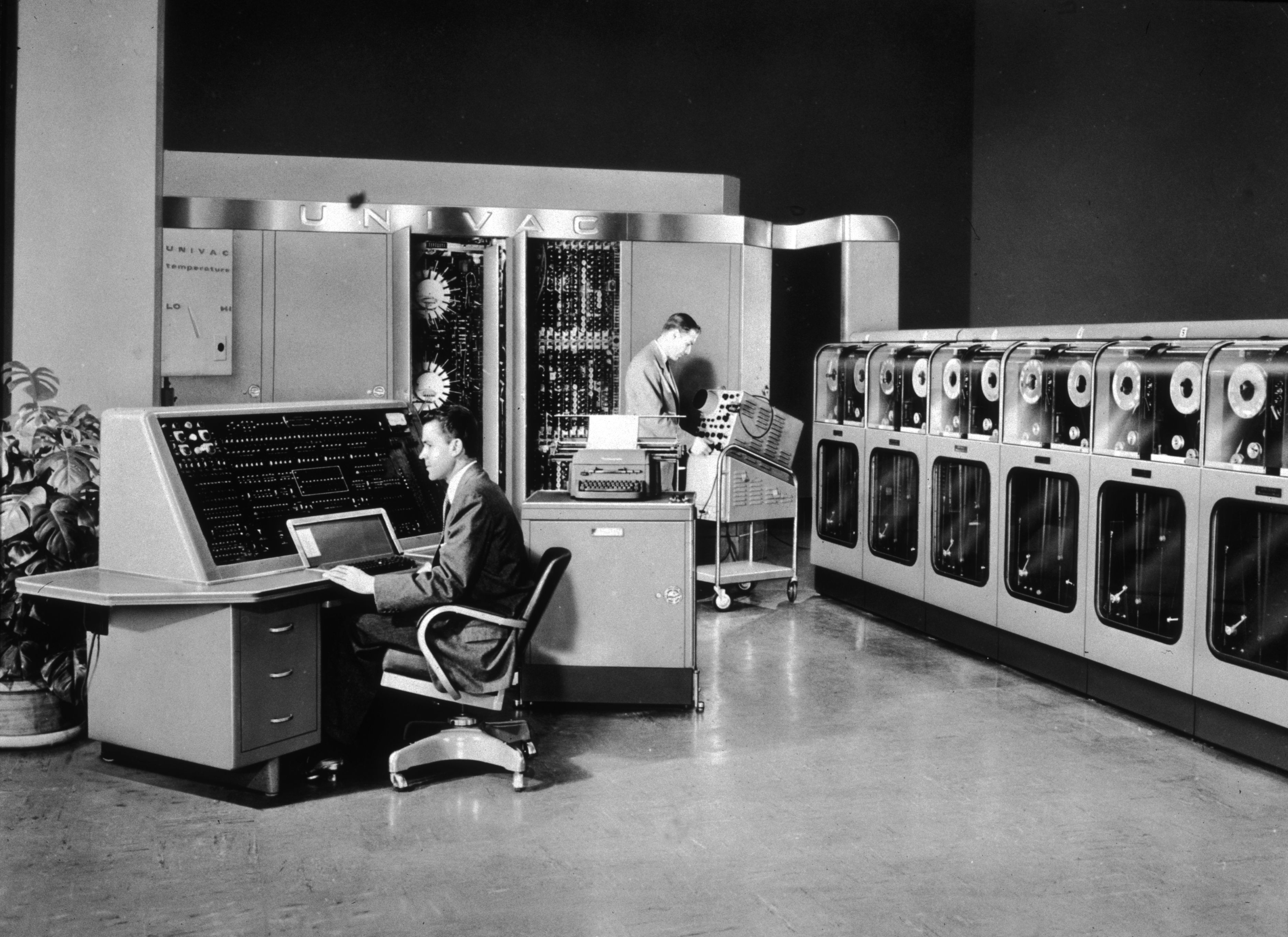
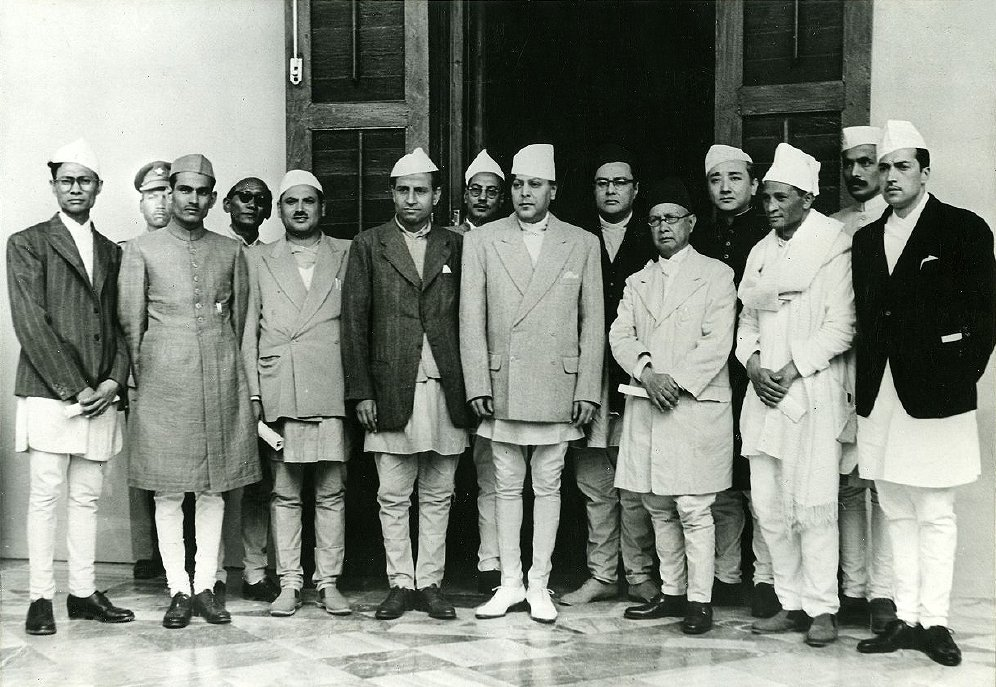
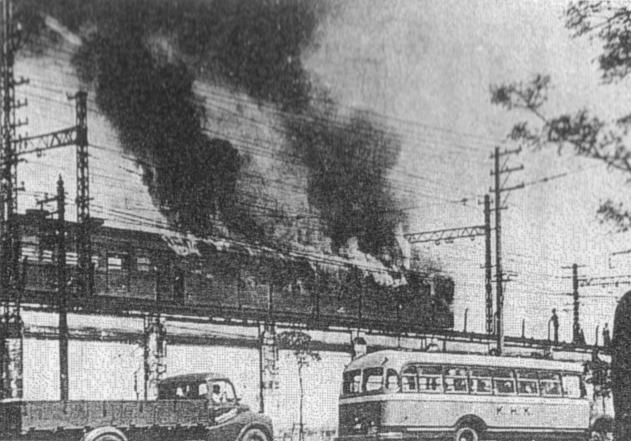
From top to bottom, left to right:
- The Julius and Ethel Rosenberg espionage trial unfolds in the United States;
- The Treaty of San Francisco restores Japan’s sovereignty;
- The nationalization of the Iranian oil industry under Mohammad Mosaddegh challenges Western influence;
- The 1951 New Zealand waterfront dispute becomes a major labor conflict;
- The 1951 eruption of Mount Lamington kills thousands;
- The King and I premieres to major acclaim;
- UNIVAC I becomes the first U.S. commercial computer;
- The 1951 Nepalese revolution ends Rana rule;
- The Sakuragichō train fire kills over 100 passengers in Yokohama.

1951 (MCMLI) was a common year starting on Monday of the Gregorian calendar, the 1951st year of the Common Era (CE) and Anno Domini (AD) designations, the 951st year of the 2nd millennium, the 51st year of the 20th century, and the 2nd year of the 1950s decade.

== Events ==
=== January ===
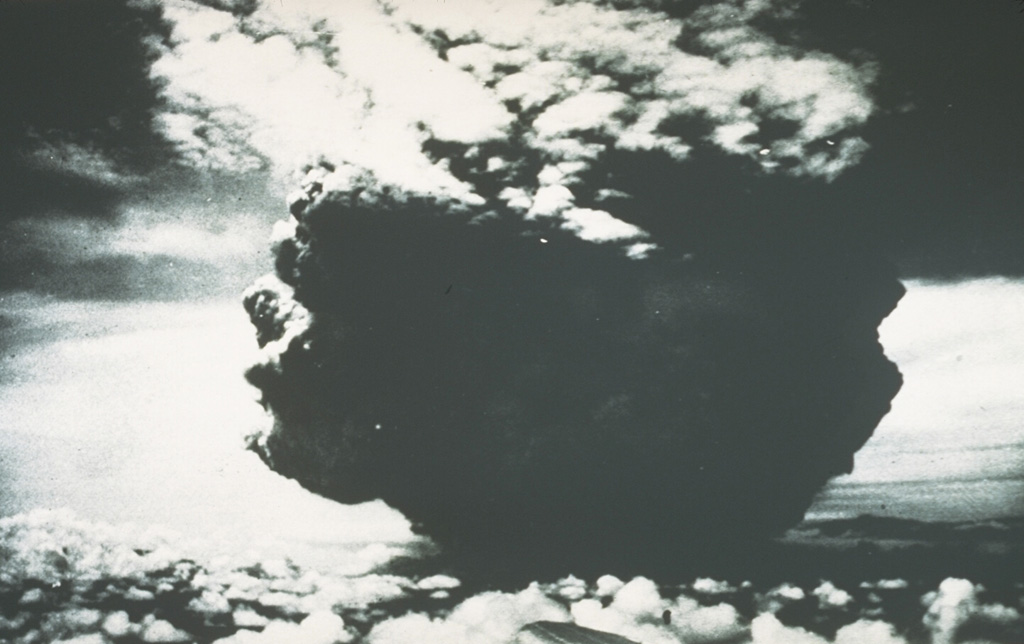
January 21: The eruption of Mount Lamington

- January 1 – According to the Gregorian calendar, exactly 95% of the 2nd millennium had elapsed as of this date, with 950 years down and 50 years remaining.
- January 4 – Korean War: Third Battle of Seoul – Chinese and North Korean forces capture Seoul for the second time (having lost the Second Battle of Seoul in September 1950).
- January 9 – The Government of the United Kingdom announces abandonment of the Tanganyika groundnut scheme for the cultivation of peanuts in the Tanganyika Territory, with the writing off of £36.5M debt.
- January 11 – In the U.S., a top secret report is delivered to U.S. President Truman by his National Security Resources Board, urging Truman to expand the Korean War by launching "a global offensive against communism" with sustained bombing of Red China and diplomatic moves to establish "moral justification" for a U.S. nuclear attack on the Soviet Union. The report will not be declassified until 1978.
- January 15 – In a criminal court in West Germany, Ilse Koch, The "Witch of Buchenwald", wife of the commandant of the Buchenwald concentration camp, is sentenced to life imprisonment.
- January 20 – Winter of Terror: Avalanches in the Alps kill 240 and bury 45,000 for a time, in Switzerland, Austria and Italy.
- January 21 – Mount Lamington in Papua New Guinea erupts catastrophically, killing nearly 3,000 people and causing great devastation in Oro Province.
- January 25 – Dutch author Anne de Vries releases the first volume of his children's novel Journey Through the Night (Reis door de nacht), set during World War II.

=== February ===
- February – The Convention People's Party wins national elections in Gold Coast (British colony).
- February 1–2 – The 1951 Nepalese revolution leads to agreement for a democratic constitution.
- February 1 – The United Nations General Assembly declares that China is an aggressor in the Korean War, in United Nations General Assembly Resolution 498.
- February 6 – Woodbridge train wreck: A Pennsylvania Railroad passenger train derails near Woodbridge Township, New Jersey, killing 85 people and injuring over 500, in one of the worst rail disasters in American history.
- February 12
  - The seven-nation Commonwealth Consultative Committee meets to discuss the Colombo Plan for south and south-east Asia.
  - Muhammad Reza Shah marries Soraya Esfandiary-Bakhtiari.
- February 19 – Jean Lee becomes the last woman hanged in Australia, when she and her two pimps are hanged for the murder and torture of a 73-year-old bookmaker.
- February 25 – The first Pan American Games open in Buenos Aires.
- February 27 – The Twenty-second Amendment to the United States Constitution, limiting Presidents to two terms, is ratified.

=== March ===
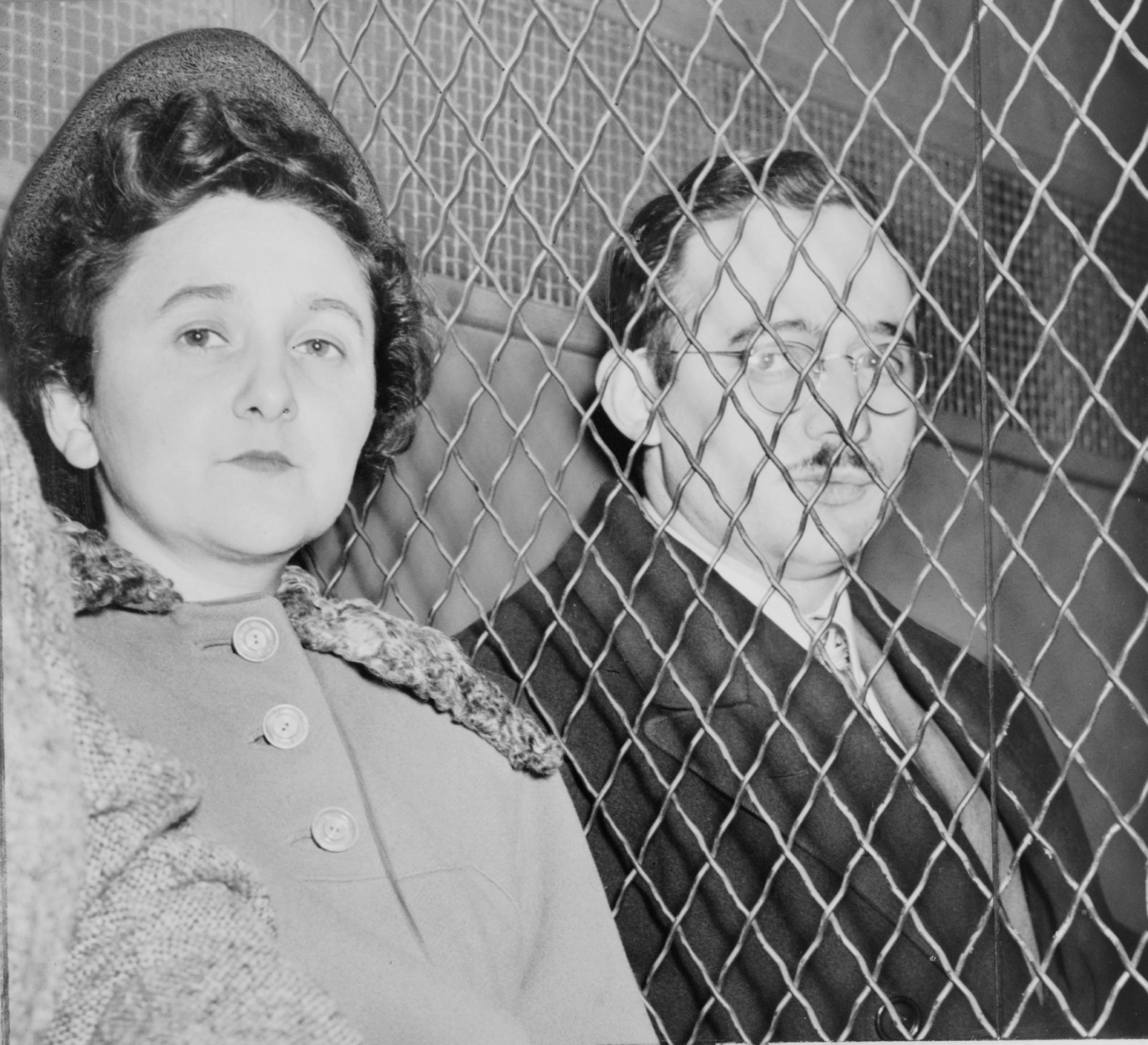
March 29: The Rosenbergs sentenced to death.

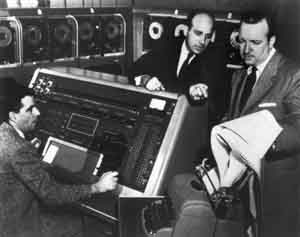
March 31: Remington Rand delivers the first UNIVAC I computer.

- March 6 – The trial of Julius and Ethel Rosenberg for conspiracy to commit espionage begins in the United States.
- March 14
  - Korean War: Operation Ripper – For the second time, United Nations troops recapture Seoul.
  - West Germany joins UNESCO.
- March 29
  - Second Red Scare: In the United States, Julius and Ethel Rosenberg are convicted of conspiracy to commit espionage. On April 5 they are sentenced to death.
  - Rodgers and Hammerstein's The King and I opens on Broadway, and runs for three years. It is the first of their musicals specifically written for an actress (Gertrude Lawrence). Lawrence is stricken with cancer during the run of the show, and dies halfway through its run a year later. The show makes a star of Yul Brynner.
  - The 23rd Academy Awards Ceremony is held; All About Eve wins the Best Picture award and five others.
- March 31 – Remington Rand delivers the first UNIVAC I computer to the United States Census Bureau.
- March – The Israeli government organizes Operation Ezra and Nehemiah, a mass airlift of Jews out of Iraq.

=== April ===
- April 11
  - U.S. President Harry S. Truman relieves General Douglas MacArthur of his Far Eastern commands.
  - After its clandestine removal from Westminster Abbey on Christmas Day, 1950, the Stone of Scone resurfaces at Arbroath Abbey in Scotland.
- April 18 – The Treaty of Paris (1951) is adopted, establishing the European Coal and Steel Community.
- April 21 – The National Olympic Committee of the Soviet Union is formed. The USSR will first participate in the Olympic Games at Helsinki, Finland, in 1952.
- April 24 – Sakuragichō train fire: in Yokohama, Japan, a fire on a train kills more than 100.
- April 28 – 1951 Australian federal election: Robert Menzies' Liberal/Country Coalition Government is re-elected with a decreased majority, defeating the Labor Party, led by former Prime Minister Ben Chifley. Chifley dies a little over a month after the election; he will be replaced by his deputy H. V. Evatt.

=== May ===
- May 1 – The opera house of Geneva, Switzerland is almost destroyed in a fire.
- May 3
  - King George VI opens the Festival of Britain in London, including the Royal Festival Hall.
  - The U.S. Senate Committee on Armed Services and U.S. Senate Committee on Foreign Relations begin their closed door hearings into the dismissal of General Douglas MacArthur by U.S. President Harry S Truman.
- May 8 – Operation Greenhouse: The first thermonuclear weapon is tested in the "George" test on Enewetok Atoll in the Marshall Islands by the United States.
- May 15 – A military coup occurs in Bolivia.
- May 23 – The Tibetan government signs the Seventeen Point Agreement for the Peaceful Liberation of Tibet with the People's Republic of China.
- May 24 – Operation Greenhouse: The first atomic bomb "boosted" by the inclusion of tritium is tested in the "Item" test on Enewetok Atoll in the Marshall Islands by the United States.
- May 25–26 – British spies Guy Burgess and Donald Maclean leave the United Kingdom to defect to the Soviet Union.

=== June ===
- June 7 – Nazi war criminal Otto Ohlendorf is hanged at Landsberg Prison, Bavaria.
- June 14 – UNIVAC I is dedicated by the U.S. Census Bureau.
- June 15–July 1 – In New Mexico, Arizona, California, Oregon, Washington and British Columbia, thousands of acres of forests are destroyed in fires.

=== July ===
- July 2 — The cremated remains of Mary Reeser are found at her home in Saint Petersburg, Florida. She is believed to have been a victim of spontaneous human combustion. The FBI believes that the near total consumption of her body by the fire was caused by the Wick effect.
- July 4 – William Shockley of Bell Labs in the United States announces the invention jointly with John Bardeen and Walter Brattain of the grown-junction transistor. Also this year, General Electric and RCA develop the alloy-junction transistor.
- July 10
  - Korean War: Armistice negotiations begin at Kaesong.
  - A formal peace agreement between Canada and Germany is signed.
- July 13 – Vuoristorata, one of the oldest still-operating wooden roller coasters in Europe, is opened at the Linnanmäki amusement park in Helsinki, Finland.
- July 16 – King Leopold III of Belgium abdicates in favour of his son Baudouin, who on July 17 takes the oath as king of Belgium.
- July 20 – King Abdullah I of Jordan is assassinated by a Palestinian while attending Friday prayers in Jerusalem. He is succeeded by his son, King Talal.
- July 22 – Soviet space dogs Dezik and Tsygan become the first to enter space, in a 15-minute sub-orbital spaceflight in an R-1 rocket, being safely parachuted back to earth.
- July 23 – Marshal Philippe Pétain, former Prime Minister and Head of State of France, Chief of State of Vichy France during World War II, hero commander of World War I who led the French Army to victory at the nine-month-long Battle of Verdun, for which he was called "the Lion of Verdun", dies while serving a sentence of life-imprisonment on the island of Île-d'Yeu at 95 years old.
- July 26 – The first birch bark manuscript is discovered in Novgorod.
- July 28 – Convention Relating to the Status of Refugees, a multilateral treaty of the United Nations, is signed at a special conference in Geneva, defining the status of refugees and setting out the basis for granting right of asylum, coming into force on 22 April 1954.

=== August ===
- August 11 – René Pleven becomes Prime Minister of France.
- August 31 – The first Volkswagen Type 1 rolls off the production line in Uitenhage, South Africa.

=== September ===
- September 1 – The United States, Australia and New Zealand all sign a mutual defense pact, the ANZUS Treaty.
- September 2 – The Sri Lanka Freedom Party is founded by S. W. R. D. Bandaranaike.
- September 8
  - Treaty of San Francisco: In San Francisco, 48 representatives out of 51 attending sign a peace treaty with Japan, formally ending the Pacific War; the delegations of the Soviet Union, Poland and Czechoslovakia do not sign the treaty, instead favoring separate treaties.
  - The U.S.-Japan Security Treaty, which allows United States Armed Forces to be stationed in Japan even after the end of the occupation of Japan, is signed by Japan and the United States.
- September 9 – Chinese Communist forces move into Lhasa, the capital of Tibet.
- September 10 – The United Kingdom begins an economic boycott of Iran.
- September 20 – NATO accepts Greece and Turkey as members.
- September 26–28 – A blue sun is seen over Europe: the effect is due to ash coming from the Canadian forest fires 4 months previously.
- September 30 – Charlotte Whitton becomes mayor of Ottawa and Canada's first woman mayor of a major city.

=== October ===
- October 2 – Television in the Netherlands commences with the first broadcast from NTS; also television in Denmark from DR1.
- October 3–8 – Korean War: First Battle of Maryang-san – United Nations (primarily Australian) forces drive back the Chinese.
- October 6 – Malayan Emergency: Communist insurgents kill British commander Sir Henry Gurney.
- October 14 – The Organization of Central American States (Organización de Estados Centroamericanos, ODECA) is formed.
- October 15
  - Norethisterone, the progestin used in the combined oral contraceptive pill, is synthesized by Luis E. Miramontes in Mexico.
  - On television, the situation comedy I Love Lucy airs its first episode on CBS in the U.S.
- October 16
  - Judy Garland begins a series of concerts in New York's Palace Theatre.
  - Prime Minister Liaquat Ali Khan of Pakistan is assassinated.
  - East China Normal University is founded in Shanghai, China.
- October 19 – The state of war between the United States and Germany is officially ended.
- October 21 – A storm in southern Italy kills over 100.
- October 24 – U.S. President Harry Truman declares an official end to war with Germany.
- October 26 – Winston Churchill is re-elected Prime Minister of the United Kingdom (a month before his 77th birthday) in a general election which sees the defeat of Clement Attlee's Labour government, after 6 years in power.
- October 27 – King Farouk I of Egypt declares himself king of the Sudan, with no international recognition or support.

=== November ===
- November 1 – Desert Rock exercises, the first military exercises for nuclear war, with infantry troops included, are held in the Nevada desert.
- November 2 – 6,000 British troops are flown into Egypt to quell unrest in the Suez Canal zone.
- November 10 – Direct dial coast-to-coast telephone service begins in the United States.
- November 11 – Juan Perón is re-elected president of Argentina.
- November 12 – The National Ballet of Canada performs for the first time in Eaton Auditorium, Toronto.
- November 20 – The Po River floods in northern Italy.
- November 29 – LEO runs the world's first commercial computer program, bakery valuations, for J. Lyons and Co.'s tea shops in the U.K.

=== December ===
- c. December – The Institute of War and Peace Studies is established by Dwight D. Eisenhower at Columbia University in New York (of which he is President) with William T. R. Fox as first director.
- December 3 – Lebanese University is founded in Lebanon.
- December 6 – A state of emergency is declared in Egypt, due to increasing riots.
- December 13 – A water storage tank collapses in Tucumcari, New Mexico, United States, resulting in 4 deaths and 200 buildings destroyed.
- December 17 – We Charge Genocide, a petition describing genocide against African Americans, is delivered to the United Nations.
- December 20
  - Experimental Breeder Reactor I (EBR-1), the world's first (experimental) nuclear power plant, opens in Idaho, United States.
  - A chartered Curtiss C-46 Commando crash-lands in Cobourg, Ontario Canada; all on board survive.
  - The World Meteorological Organization becomes a specialized agency of the United Nations.
- December 22 – The Selangor Labour Party is founded in Selangor, Malaya.
- December 24
  - Libya becomes independent from Britain and France; Idris I is proclaimed King.
  - Gian Carlo Menotti's 45-minute opera, Amahl and the Night Visitors, premieres live on NBC in the United States, becoming the first opera written especially for television.
- December 31 – The Marshall Plan expires, after distributing more than $13.3 billion US in foreign aid to rebuild Europe.

=== Unknown dates ===
- IBM (United Kingdom) is formed.
- An 18-year-old sailor is fined for kissing in public in Stockholm, Sweden. The law court calls his actions "obnoxious behavior repulsive to the public morals".
- The continental United States becomes malaria-free.

== Births ==
=== January ===
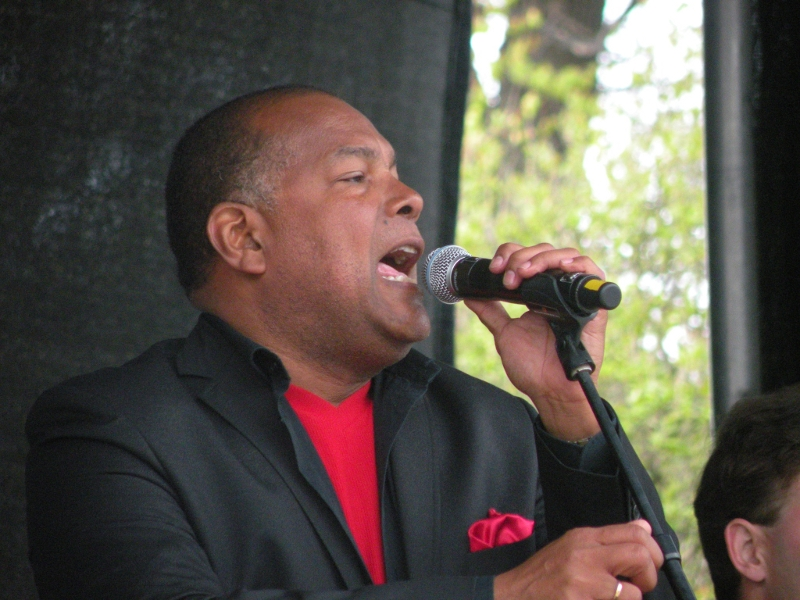
Dave Benton

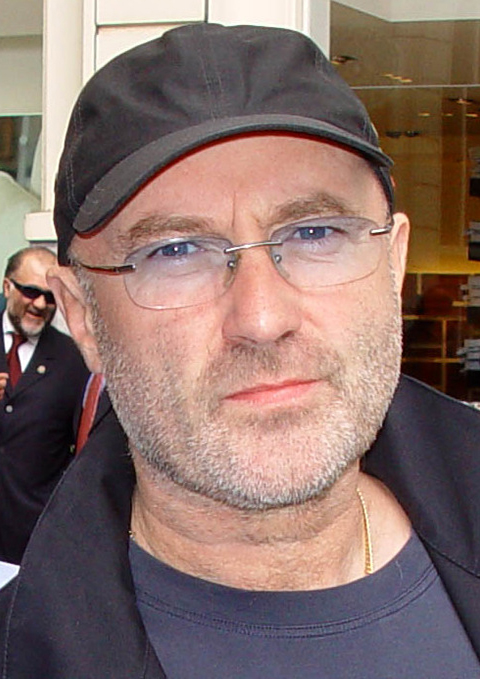
Phil Collins

- January 1
  - Ashfaq Hussain, Urdu poet
  - Nana Patekar, Indian actor, screenwriter, philanthropist and filmmaker
- January 2 – Jan Fischer, 8th Prime Minister of the Czech Republic
- January 3 – Charles W. Mills, British-born American philosopher (d. 2021)
- January 5 – Bakunde Ilo Pablo, Congolese musician
- January 8
  - Kenny Anthony, Lucian politician, two-time Prime Minister of Saint Lucia
  - John McTiernan, American film-maker
- January 9 – Crystal Gayle, American country music singer
- January 12
  - Rush Limbaugh, American conservative radio personality (d. 2021)
  - Chris Bell, American musician (d. 1978)
- January 18 – Elijah Cummings, African-American politician (d. 2019)
- January 20 – Rouslan Saghabalyan, Russian writer, journalist and screenwriter
- January 23 – Sully Sullenberger, American diplomat and pilot
- January 25 – Steve Prefontaine, American runner (d. 1975)
- January 30 – Phil Collins, English rock musician and producer
- January 31
  - Harry Wayne Casey (KC), American musician, songwriter and producer
  - Phil Manzanera, British rock musician

=== February ===
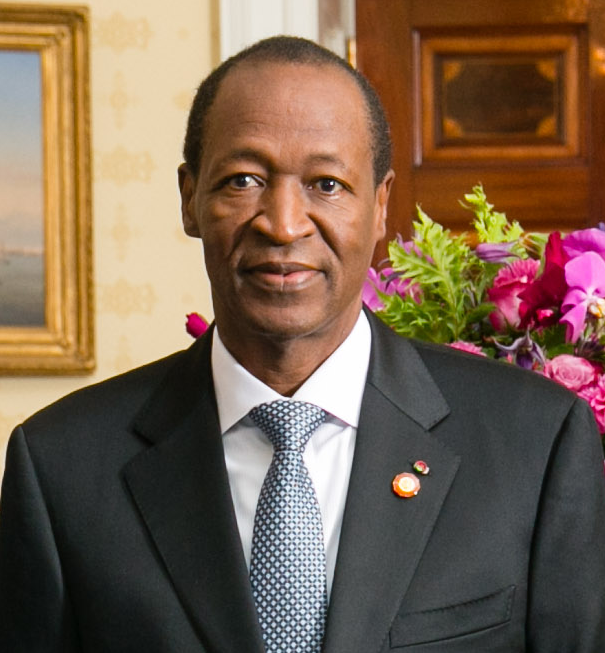
Blaise Compaoré

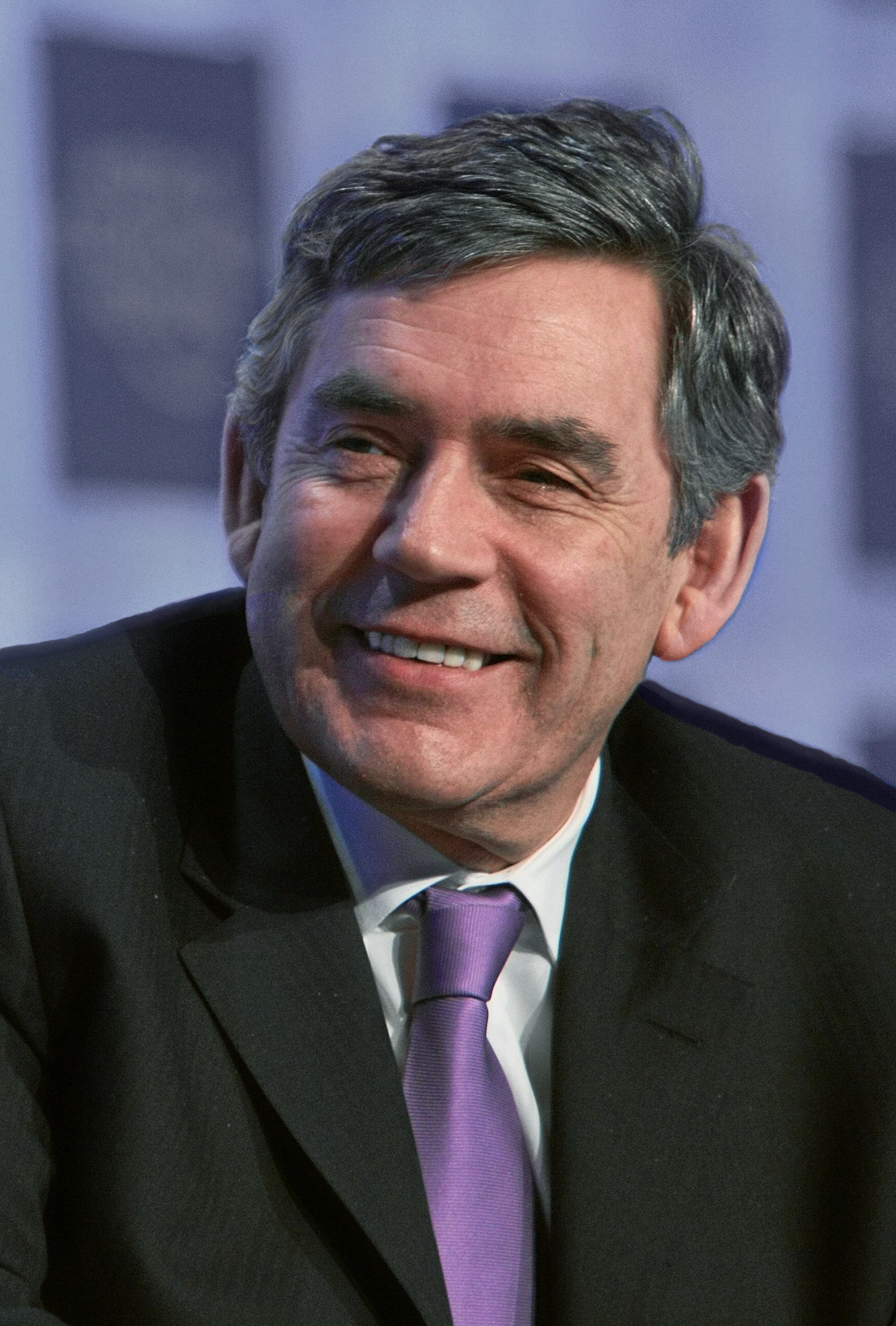
Gordon Brown

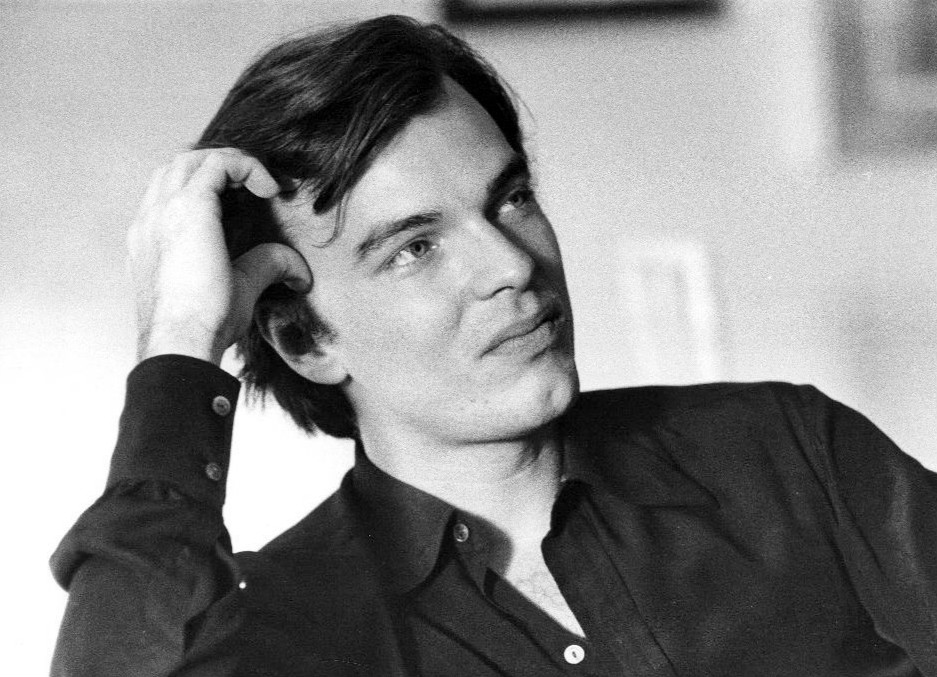
Edward Albert

- February 3
  - Blaise Compaoré, 3rd President of Burkina Faso (1987–2014)
  - Eugenijus Riabovas, Lithuanian football manager
- February 10 – Bob Iger, American CEO of The Walt Disney Company
- February 12 – Rossana Ordóñez, Venezuelan journalist (d. 2021)
- February 14 – Kevin Keegan, English footballer and manager (d. 2026)
- February 15
  - Melissa Manchester, American pop singer
  - Jane Seymour, English actress
- February 16 – William Katt, American film, television actor
- February 19 – Muhammad Tahir-ul-Qadri, Pakistani Islamic Sufi scholar, leader
- February 20
  - Gordon Brown, Scottish-born Prime Minister of the United Kingdom
  - Edward Albert, American film and television actor (d. 2006)
- February 22 – Ellen Greene, American actress
- February 23 – Patricia Richardson, American actress
- February 24 – Debra Jo Rupp, American actress
- February 25 – Don Quarrie, Jamaican sprinter
- February 27 – Steve Harley, British glam rock singer-songwriter (d. 2024)

=== March ===
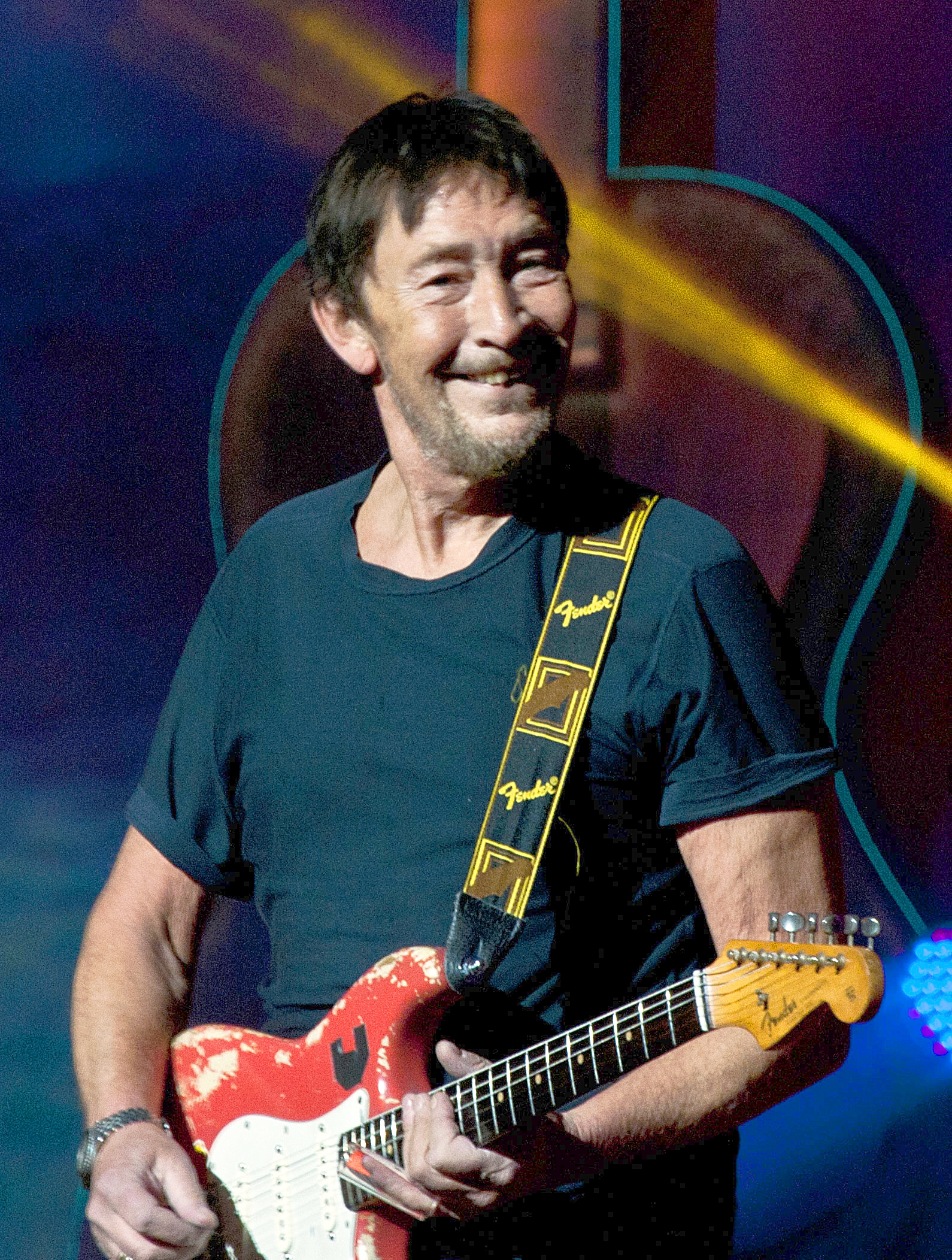
Chris Rea

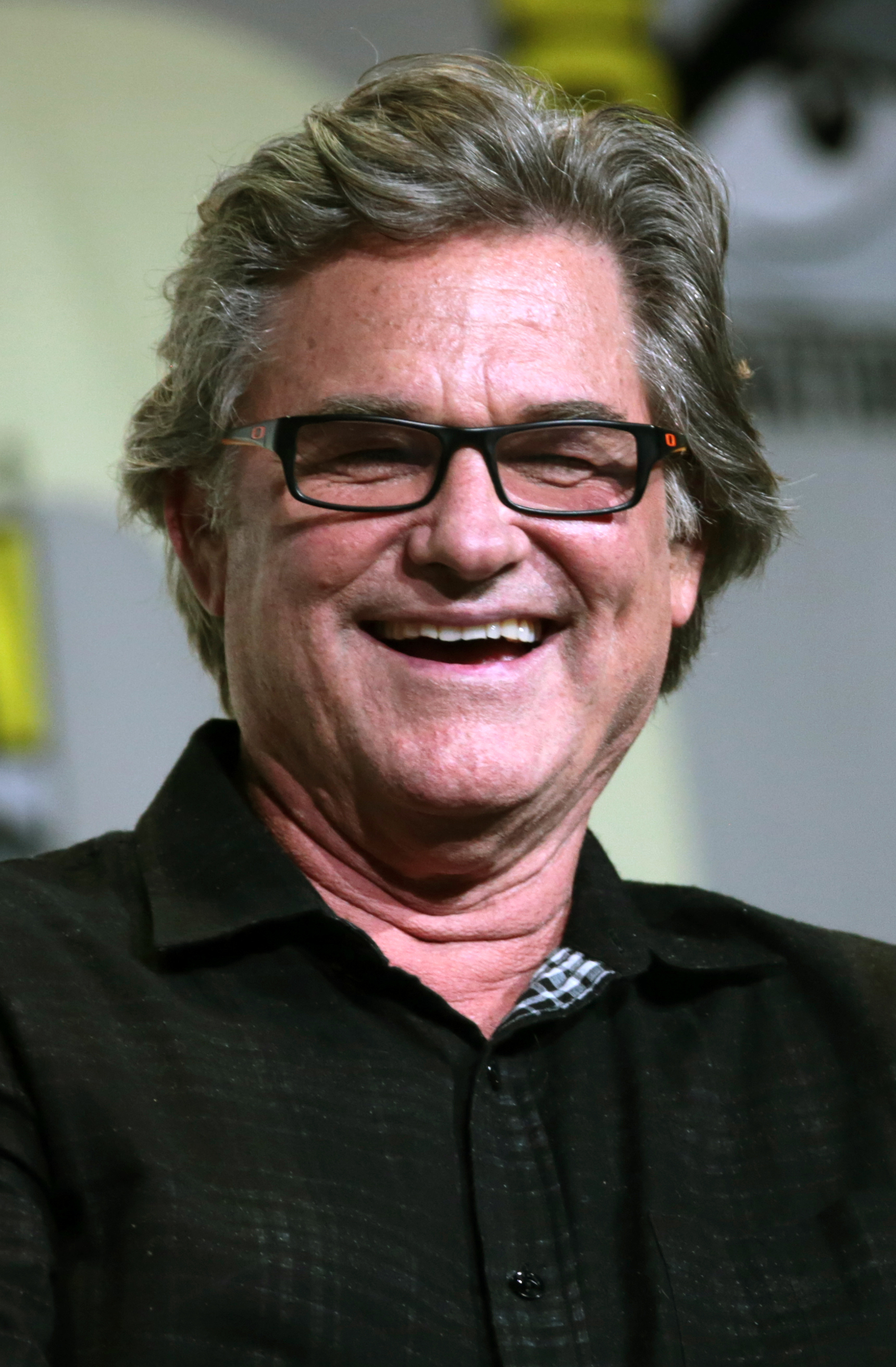
Kurt Russell

- March 1 – Deb Fischer, US Senator
- March 3 – Heizō Takenaka, Japanese economist
- March 4
  - Edelgard Bulmahn, German politician
  - Kenny Dalglish, Scottish footballer and manager
  - Chris Rea, English singer-songwriter and guitarist (d. 2025)
  - Linda Yamamoto, Japanese pop star
- March 6 – Gerrie Knetemann, Dutch cyclist (d. 2004)
- March 8 – Karen Kain, Canadian ballerina
- March 9 – Zakir Hussian, Indian tabla virtuoso, composer, percussionist, music producer and actor
- March 10 – Gloria Diaz, Filipino actress of film and television, model and beauty queen
- March 13 – Charo, Spanish-American singer, entertainer
- March 14 – Jerry Greenfield, American co-founder of Ben & Jerry's ice cream
- March 17 – Kurt Russell, American actor
- March 18 – Ben Cohen, American co-founder of Ben & Jerry's ice cream
- March 20 – Jimmie Vaughan, American blues rock guitarist and singer
- March 24 – Tommy Hilfiger, American fashion designer
- March 25 – Jumbo Tsuruta, Japanese professional wrestler (d. 2000)
- March 26
  - Aleksey Buldakov, Russian actor (d. 2019)
  - Carl Wieman, American physicist, Nobel Prize laureate
- March 30 – Wolfgang Niedecken, German singer

=== April ===
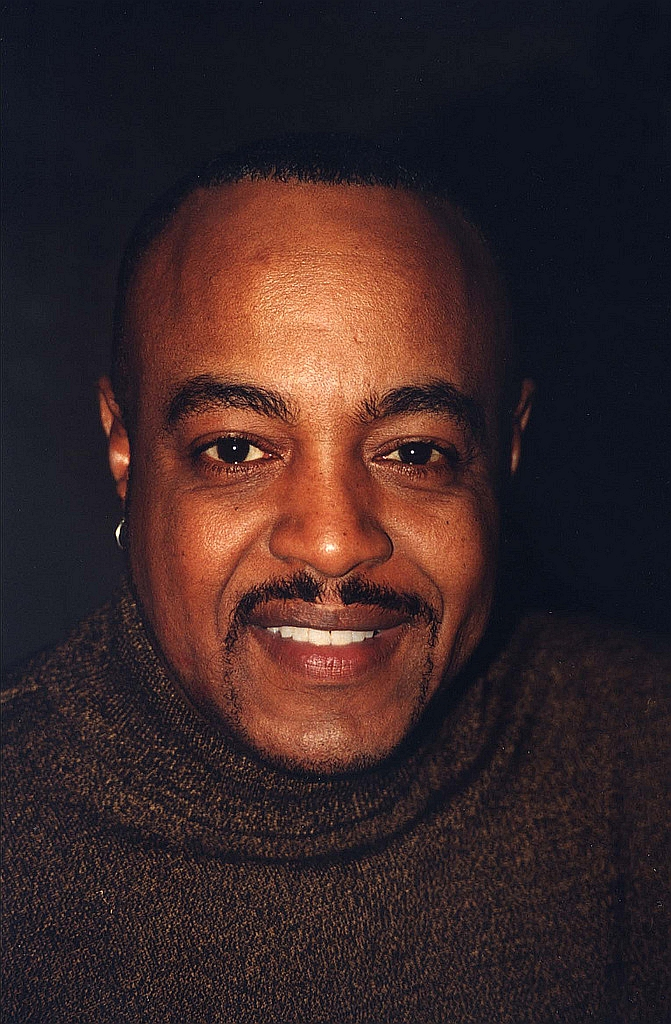
Peabo Bryson

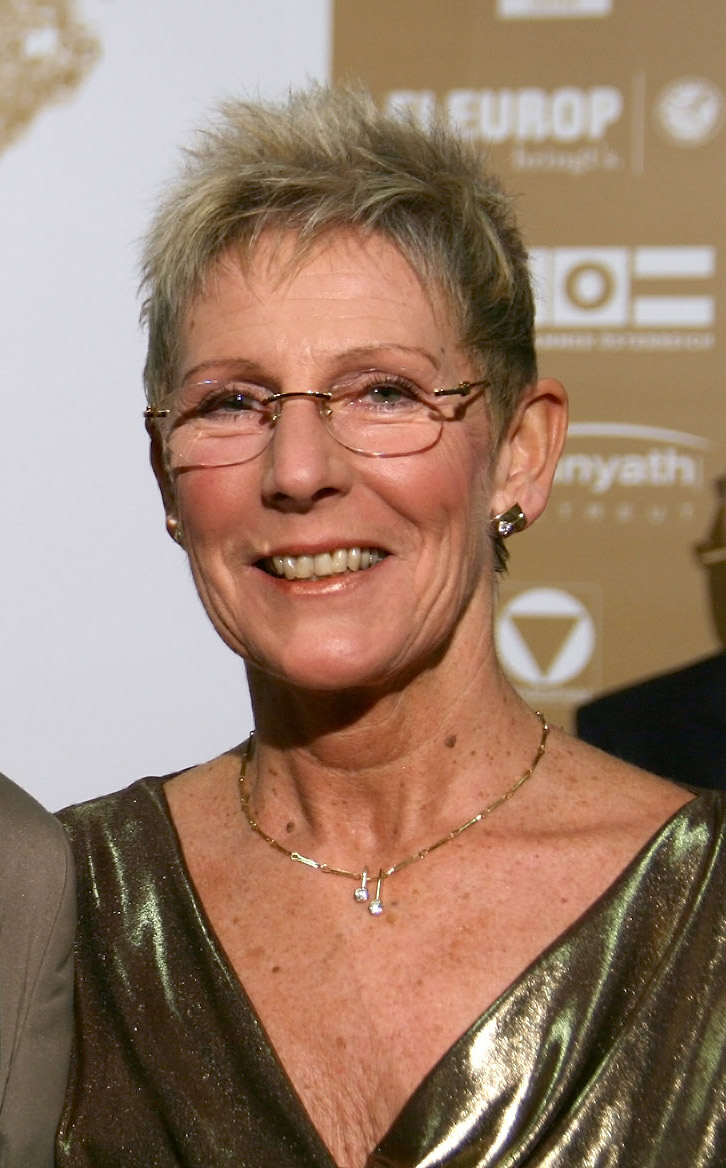
Beatrix Schuba

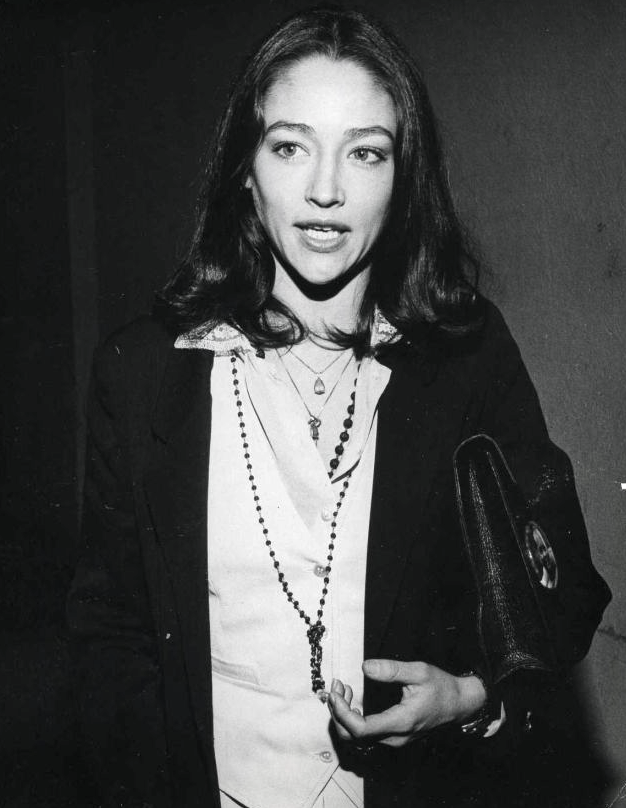
Olivia Hussey

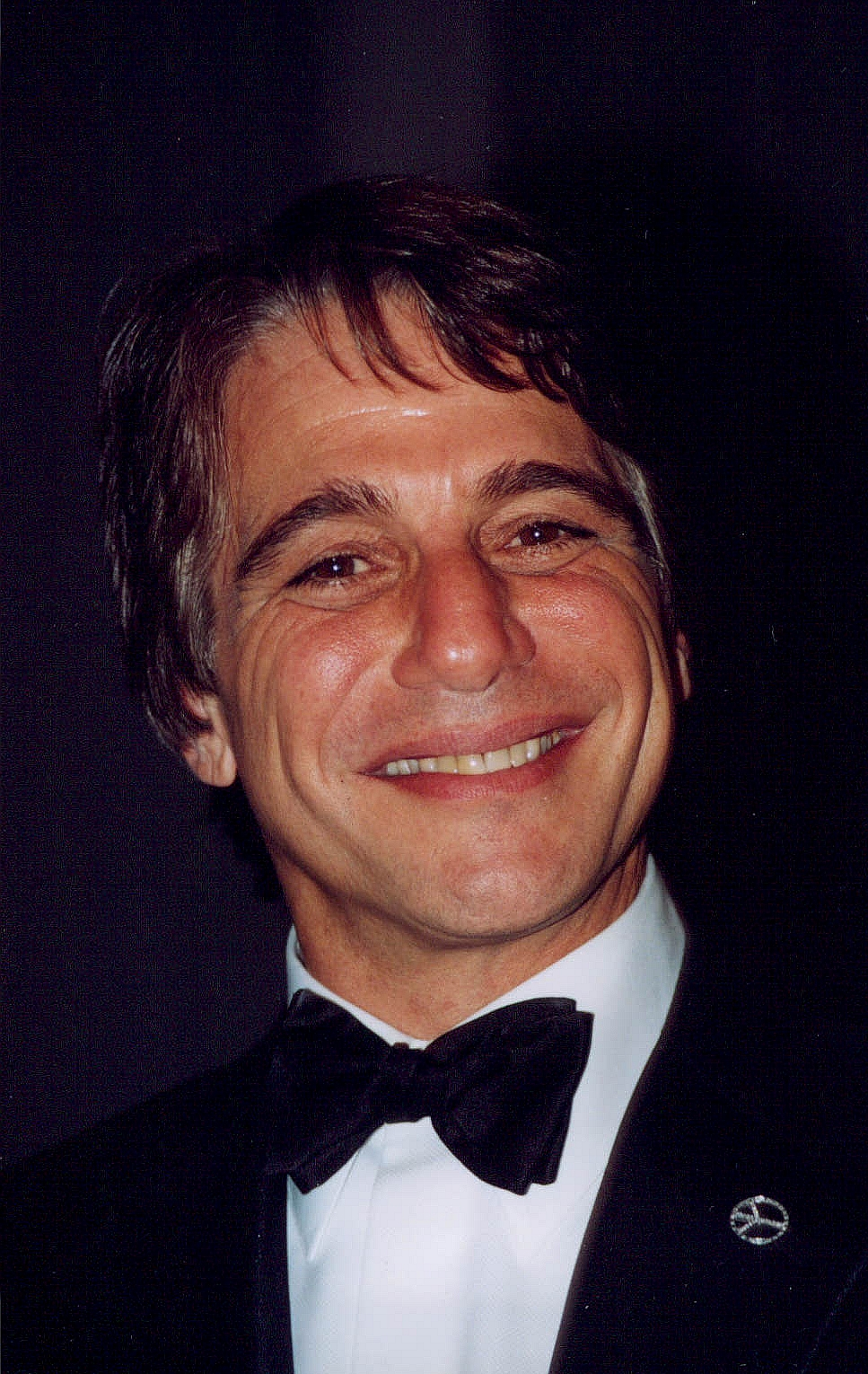
Tony Danza

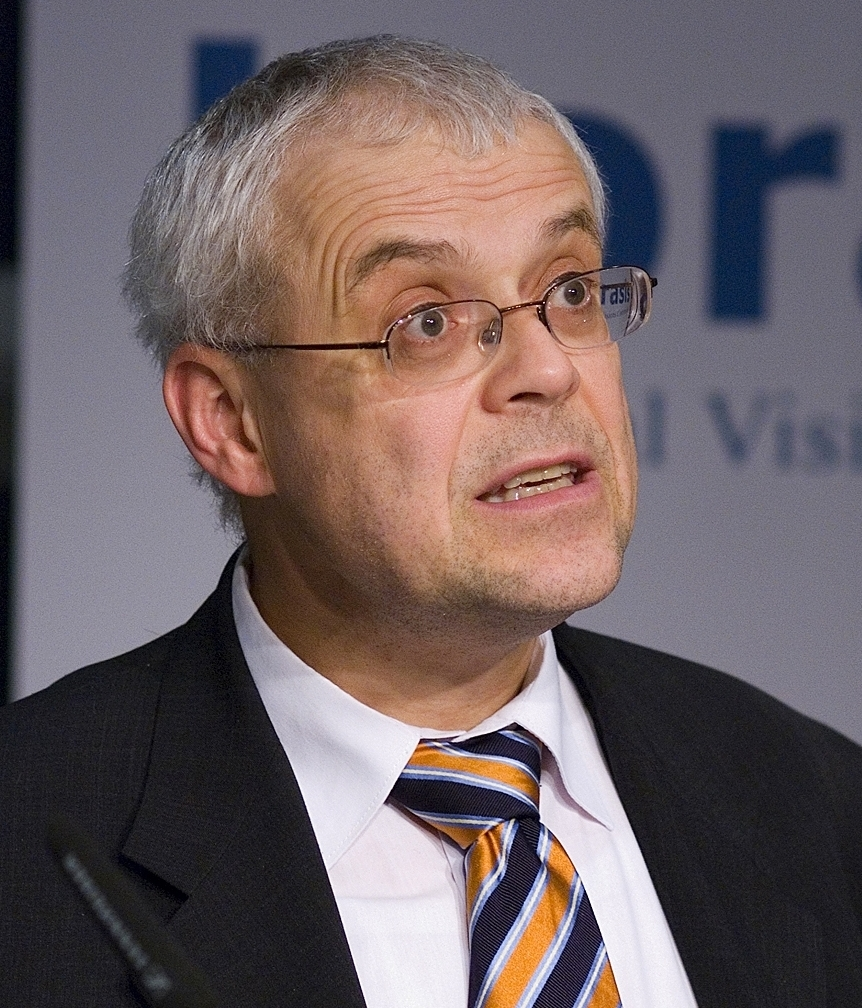
Vladimír Špidla

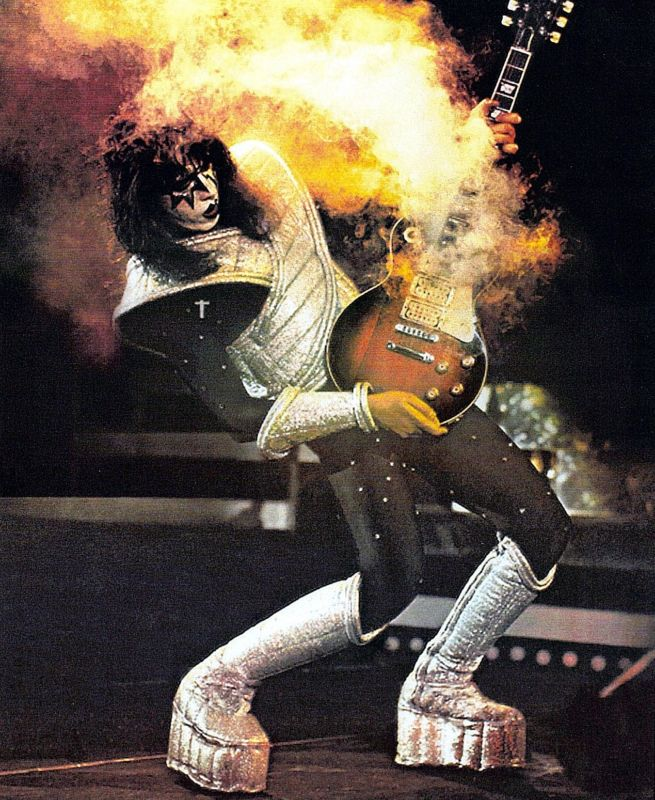
Ace Frehley

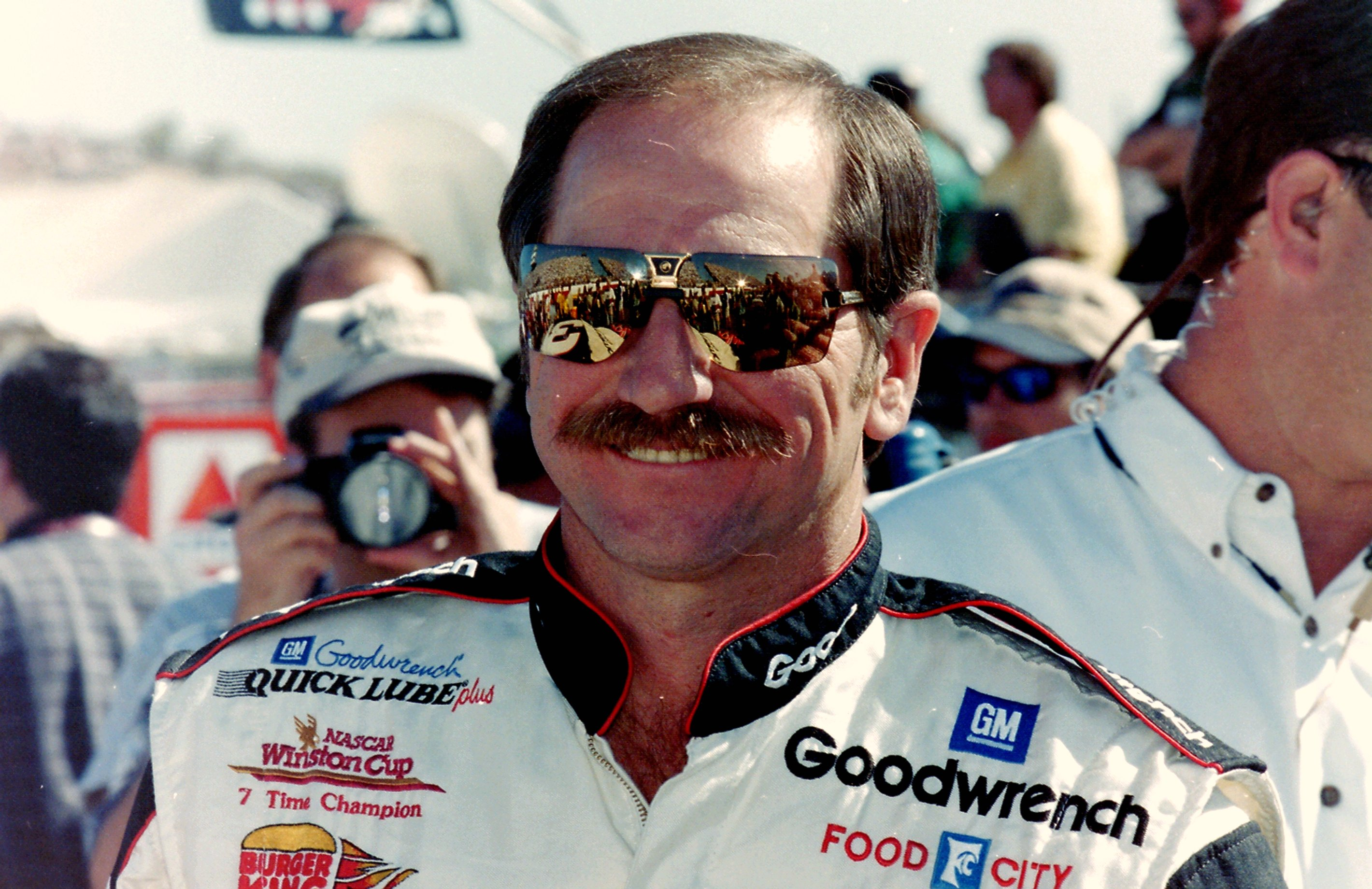
Dale Earnhardt

- April 2
  - Tom Johnson (1970s pitcher), American baseball player
  - Ayako Okamoto, Japanese golfer
- April 4
  - Louis Hendrik Potgieter, South-African lead singer of Dschinghis Khan in Munich Germany (d. 1994)
- April 5
  - Dean Kamen, American inventor, entrepreneur
  - Fr. Sylvester Wijayakulasuriya, Parish Priest
  - Guy Vanderhaeghe, Canadian author
- April 6 – Rita Raave, Estonian actress
- April 7 – Janis Ian, American singer-songwriter
- April 8
  - Geir Haarde, Prime Minister of Iceland (2006–2009)
  - Joan Sebastian, Mexican singer, songwriter (d. 2015)
- April 12 – Tom Noonan, American actor (d. 2026)
- April 13
  - Peabo Bryson, African-American singer (d. 2026)
  - Peter Davison, British actor
  - Max Weinberg, American drummer
- April 14
  - Julian Lloyd Webber, English cellist
  - Greg Winter, English biochemist, Nobel Prize laureate
- April 15 – Beatrix Schuba, Austrian figure skater
- April 16
  - Björgvin Halldórsson, Icelandic singer
  - Pierre Toutain-Dorbec, French photographer
- April 17
  - Horst Hrubesch, German footballer
  - Olivia Hussey, Argentine-born actress (Romeo and Juliet) (d. 2024)
  - Milagros Mata Gil, Venezuelan novelist and essayist.
- April 19 – Jóannes Eidesgaard, Prime Minister of the Faroe Islands
- April 20
  - Louise Jameson, British actress
  - Luther Vandross, African-American R&B, soul singer, songwriter (d. 2005)
- April 21
  - Tony Danza, American actor and comedian
  - Vladimír Špidla, 4th Prime Minister of the Czech Republic
- April 22 – Paul Carrack, English singer
- April 24 – Enda Kenny, 13th Taoiseach of Ireland
- April 27
  - Jim Justice, American politician
  - Ace Frehley, American rock guitarist (Kiss) (d. 2025)
  - Freundel Stuart, 7th Prime Minister of Barbados
- April 29
  - Kwesi Amissah-Arthur, Ghanaian economist, academic and politician (d. 2018)
  - Dale Earnhardt, American race car driver (d. 2001)

=== May ===
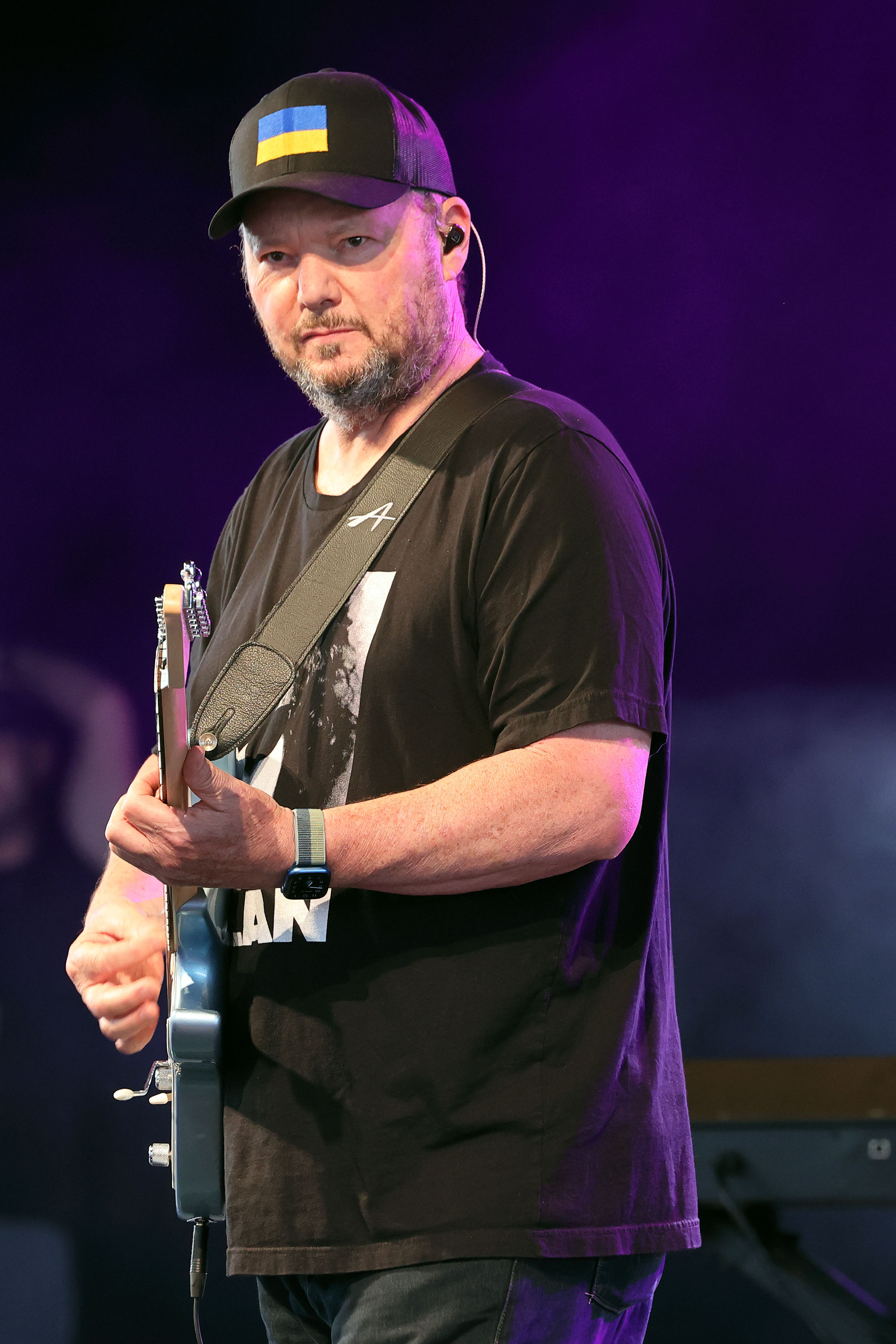
Christopher Cross

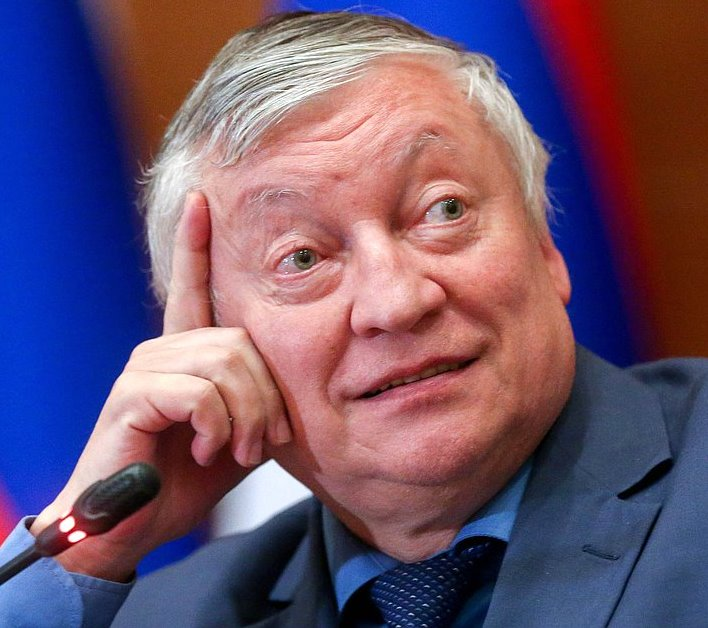
Anatoly Karpov

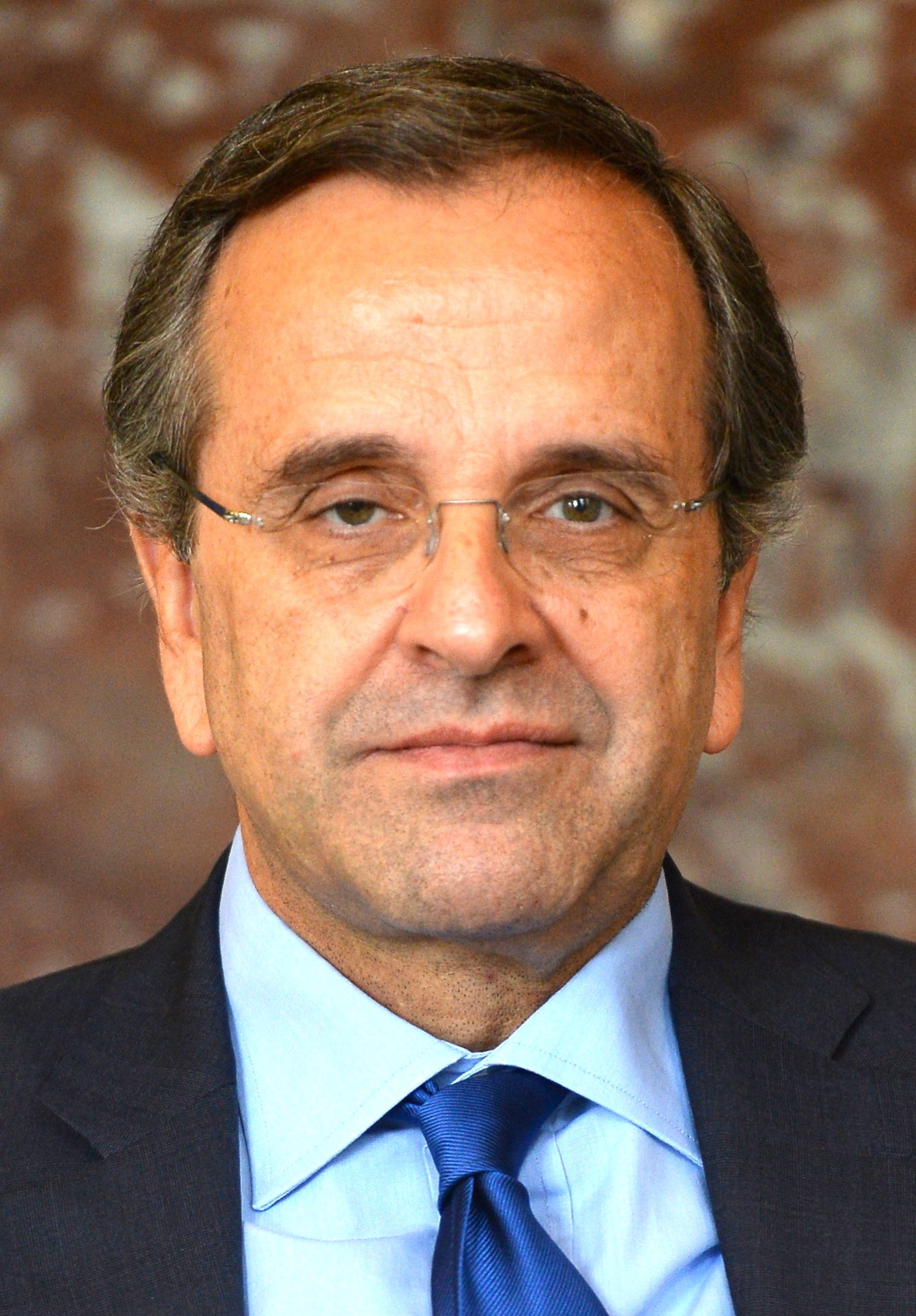
Antonis Samaras

- May 3 – Christopher Cross, American singer-songwriter
- May 4 – Jackie Jackson, American pop singer
- May 6
  - Antonio Saldías, Chilean historian
  - Samuel Doe, President of Liberia (d. 1990)
- May 9
  - Christopher Dewdney, Canadian poet
  - Joy Harjo, Native American poet
- May 13 – James Whale (presenter), British radio personality, television host, podcast host and author (d. 2025)
- May 15
  - Yoshifumi Hibako, Japanese general
  - Jonathan Richman, American musician
  - Frank Wilczek, American physicist, Nobel Prize laureate
- May 16 – Unshō Ishizuka, Japanese voice actor (d. 2018)
  - Jonathan Richman, American musician
- May 18 – Ben Feringa, Dutch organic chemist, Nobel Prize laureate
- May 19
  - Joey Ramone, American rock musician (Ramones) (d. 2001)
  - Dick Slater, American professional wrestler (d. 2018)
- May 20
  - Christie Blatchford, Canadian newspaper columnist, journalist and broadcaster (d. 2020)
  - Mike Crapo, US Senator- R-Idaho
- May 22 – Kenneth Bianchi, American serial killer and rapist
- May 23
  - Jill E. Barad, American businessperson
  - Anatoly Karpov, Russian chess player
  - Antonis Samaras, Greek economist, politician and 185th Prime Minister of Greece
- May 25 – Jamaluddin Jarjis, Malaysian politician (d. 2015)
- May 26
  - Ramón Calderón, Spanish lawyer and businessman
  - Lou van den Dries, Dutch mathematician
  - Sally Ride, American astronaut (d. 2012)
  - Madeleine Taylor-Quinn, Irish politician
- May 30
  - Stephen Tobolowsky, American actor
  - Fernando Lugo, President of Paraguay
- May 31 – Jimmy Nalls, American guitarist (Sea Level) (d. 2017)

=== June ===
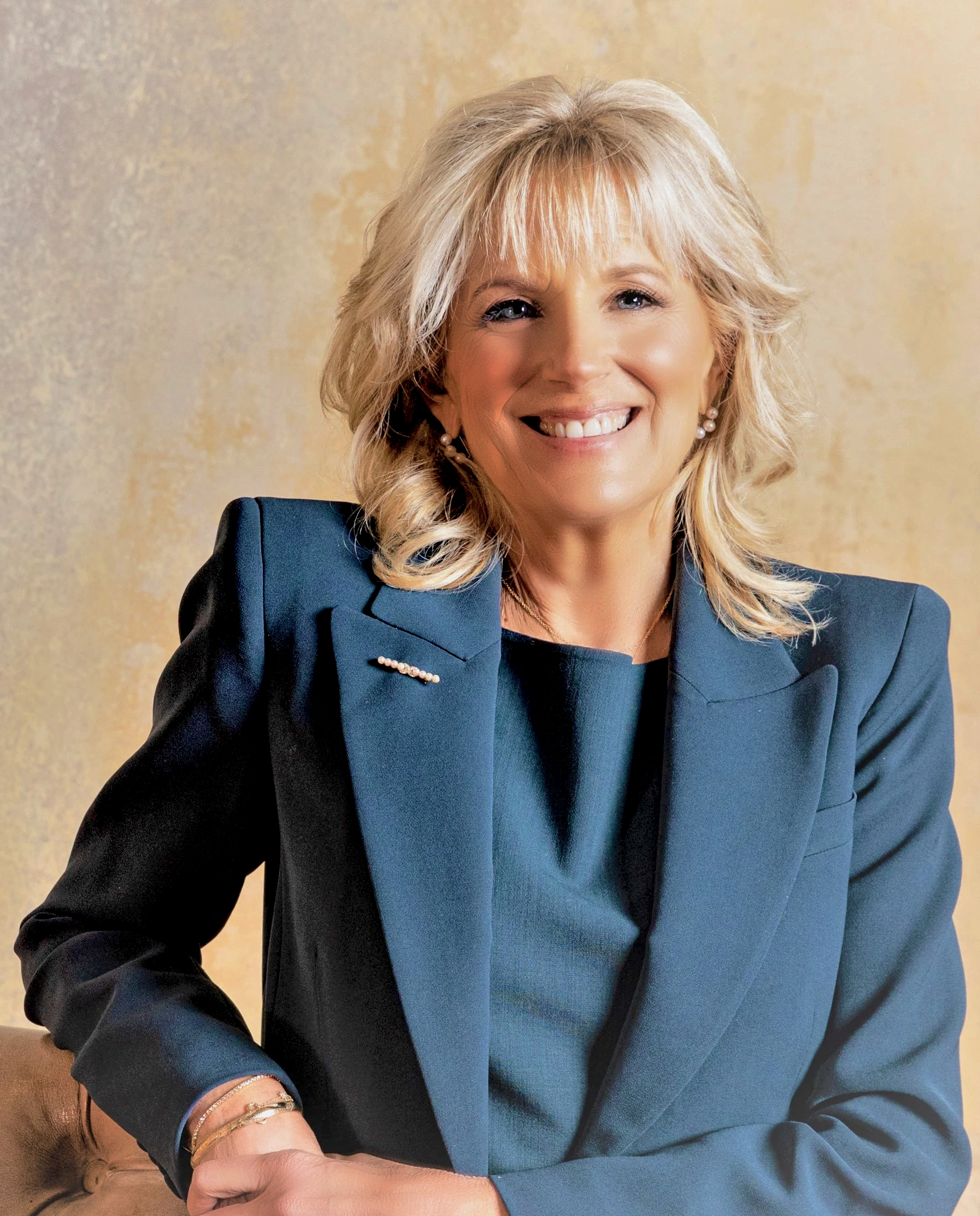
Jill Biden

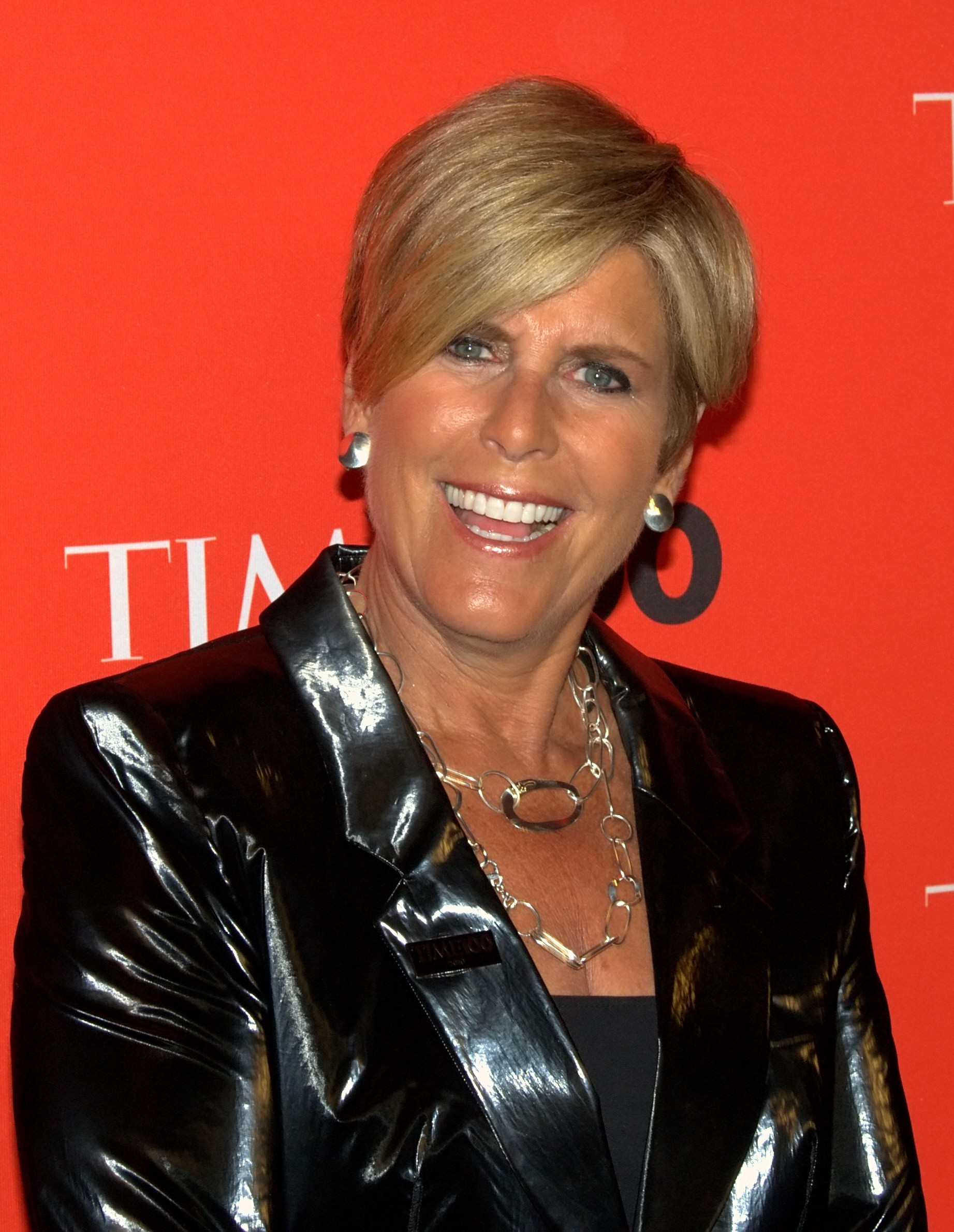
Suze Orman

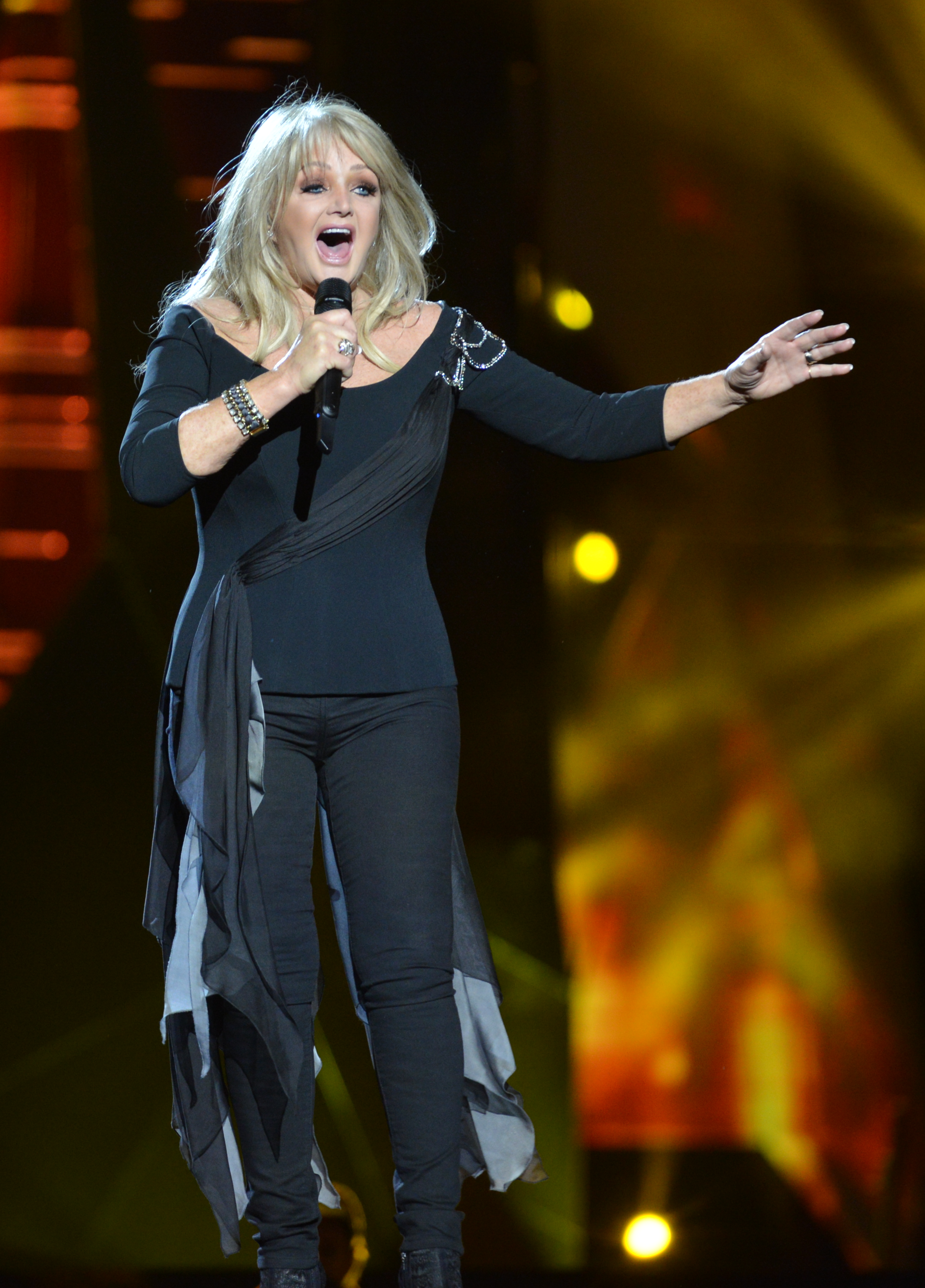
Bonnie Tyler

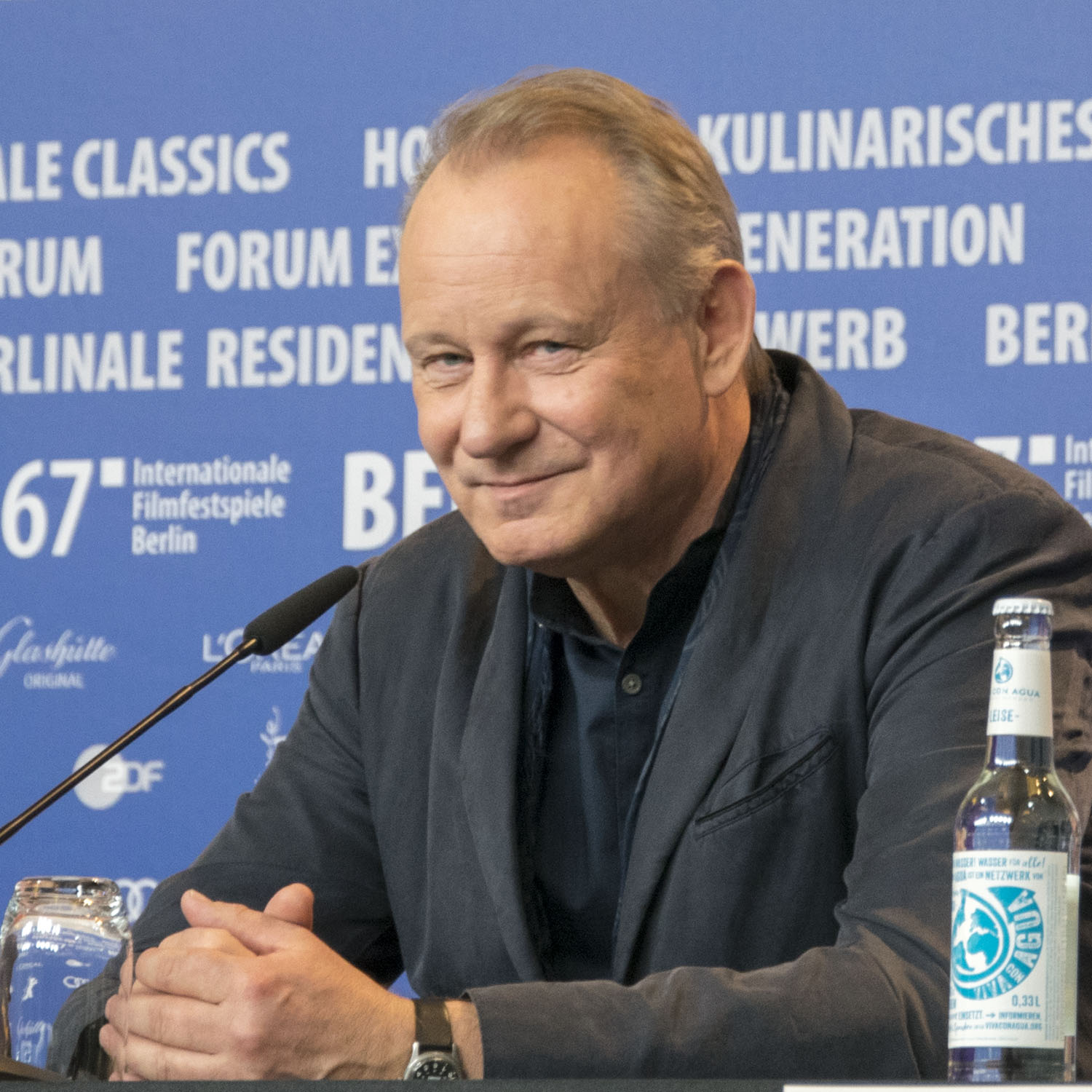
Stellan Skarsgård

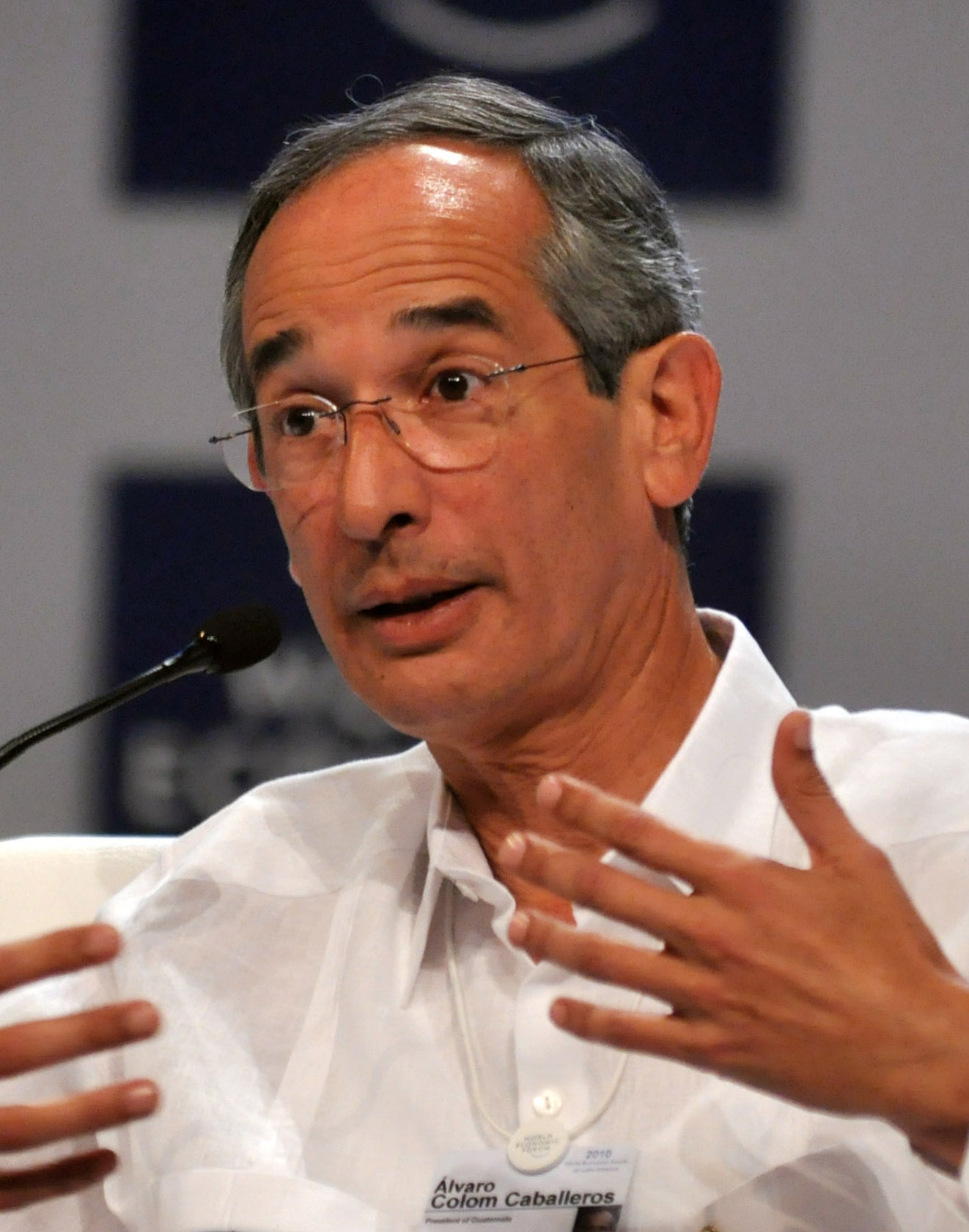
Álvaro Colom

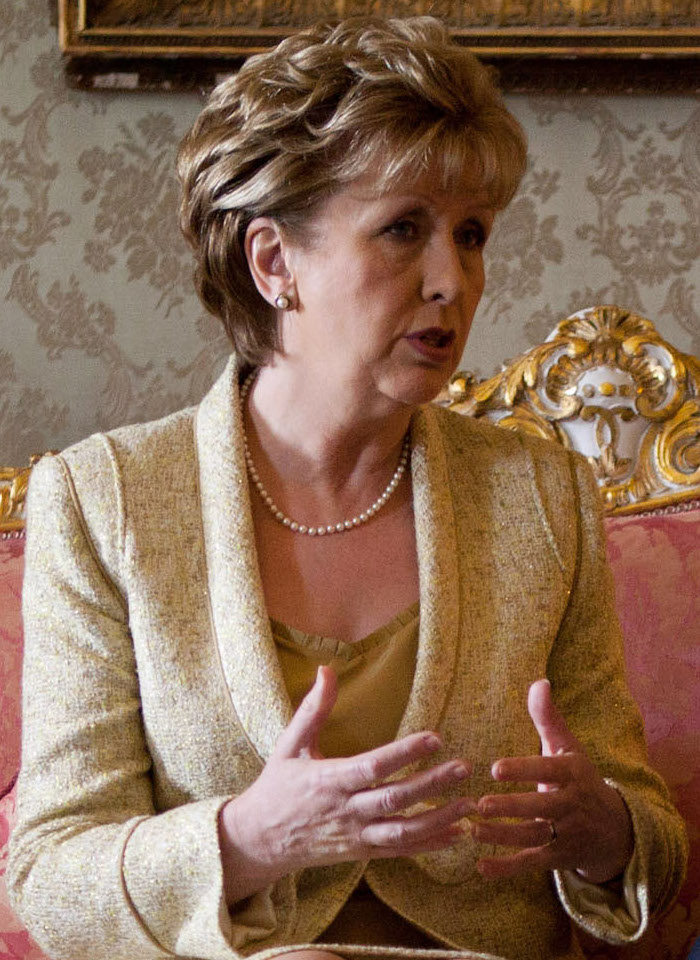
Mary McAleese

- June 2
  - Jeanine Pirro, Lebanese-American attorney, politician and conservative political commentator
  - Larry Robinson, Canadian hockey player
- June 3 – Jill Biden, First Lady of the United States
- June 8 – Bonnie Tyler, Welsh pop singer (d. 2026)
- June 9 – James Newton Howard, American musician, composer
- June 12
  - Brad Delp, American rock vocalist (d. 2007)
  - Andranik Margaryan, 14th Prime Minister of Armenia (d. 2007)
- June 13
  - Stellan Skarsgård, Swedish actor
  - Richard Thomas, American actor
- June 14 – Paul Boateng, British politician
- June 15 – Álvaro Colom, 35th President of Guatemala (d. 2023)
- June 16 – Roberto Durán, Panamanian boxer
- June 17 – Shahidan Kassim, Malaysian politician
- June 18
  - Gyula Sax, Hungarian chess grandmaster (d. 2014)
  - Steve Miner, American film, television director, film producer
- June 20
  - Tress MacNeille, American voice actress
  - Paul Muldoon, Irish-born poet
- June 21 – Nils Lofgren, American musician
- June 23 – Michèle Mouton, French rally driver
- June 25 – Elvy Sukaesih, Indonesian dangdut singer
- June 27
  - Ulf Andersson, Swedish chess player
  - Madan Bhandari, Nepalese politician (d. 1993)
  - Mary McAleese, 8th President of Ireland
- June 28
  - Mick Cronin, Australian rugby league player
  - Daniel Ruiz, Spanish footballer
- June 29 – Zvi Eliezer Alonie, Israeli rabbi
- June 30 – Stanley Clarke, American bassist

=== July ===
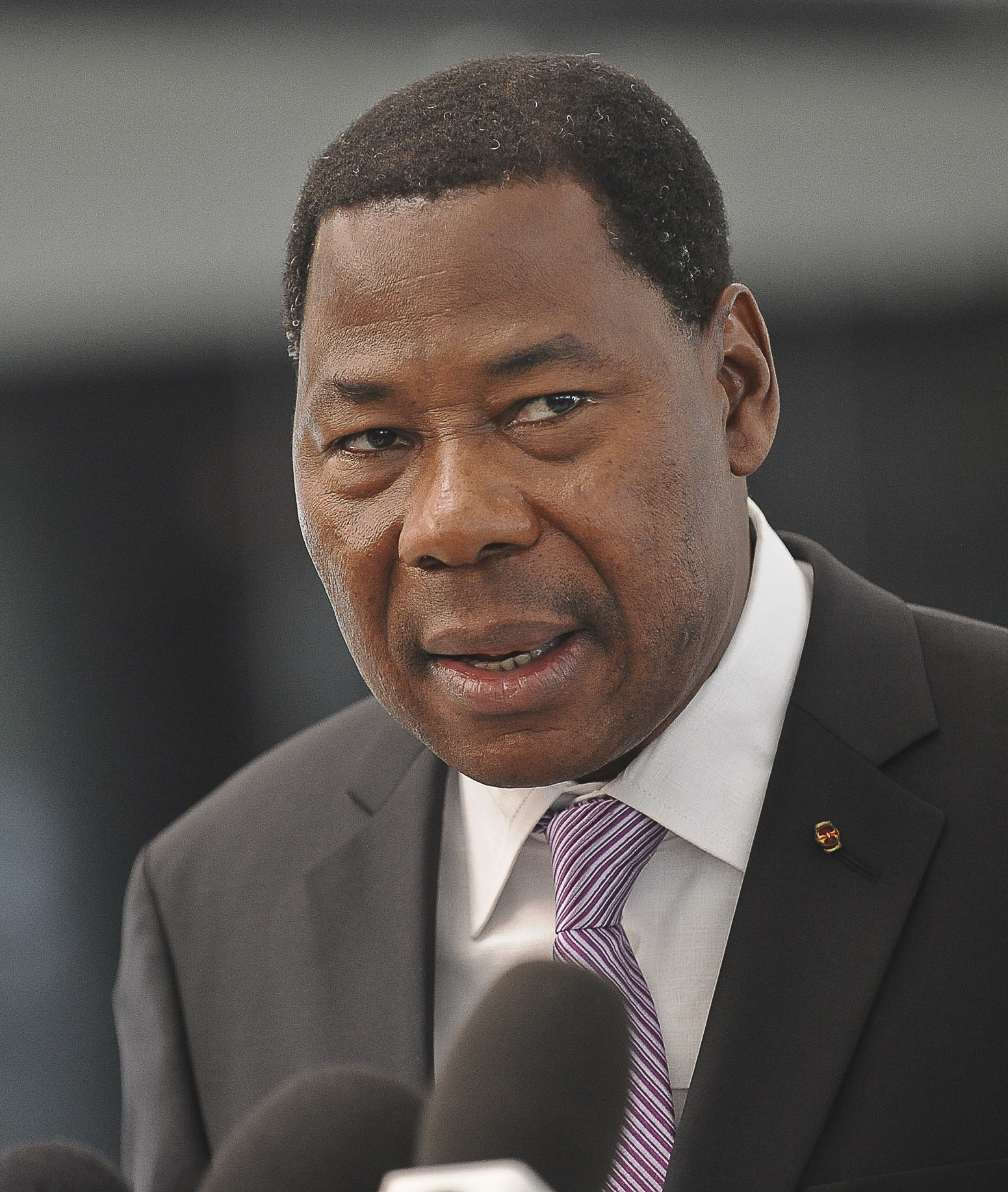
Thomas Boni Yayi

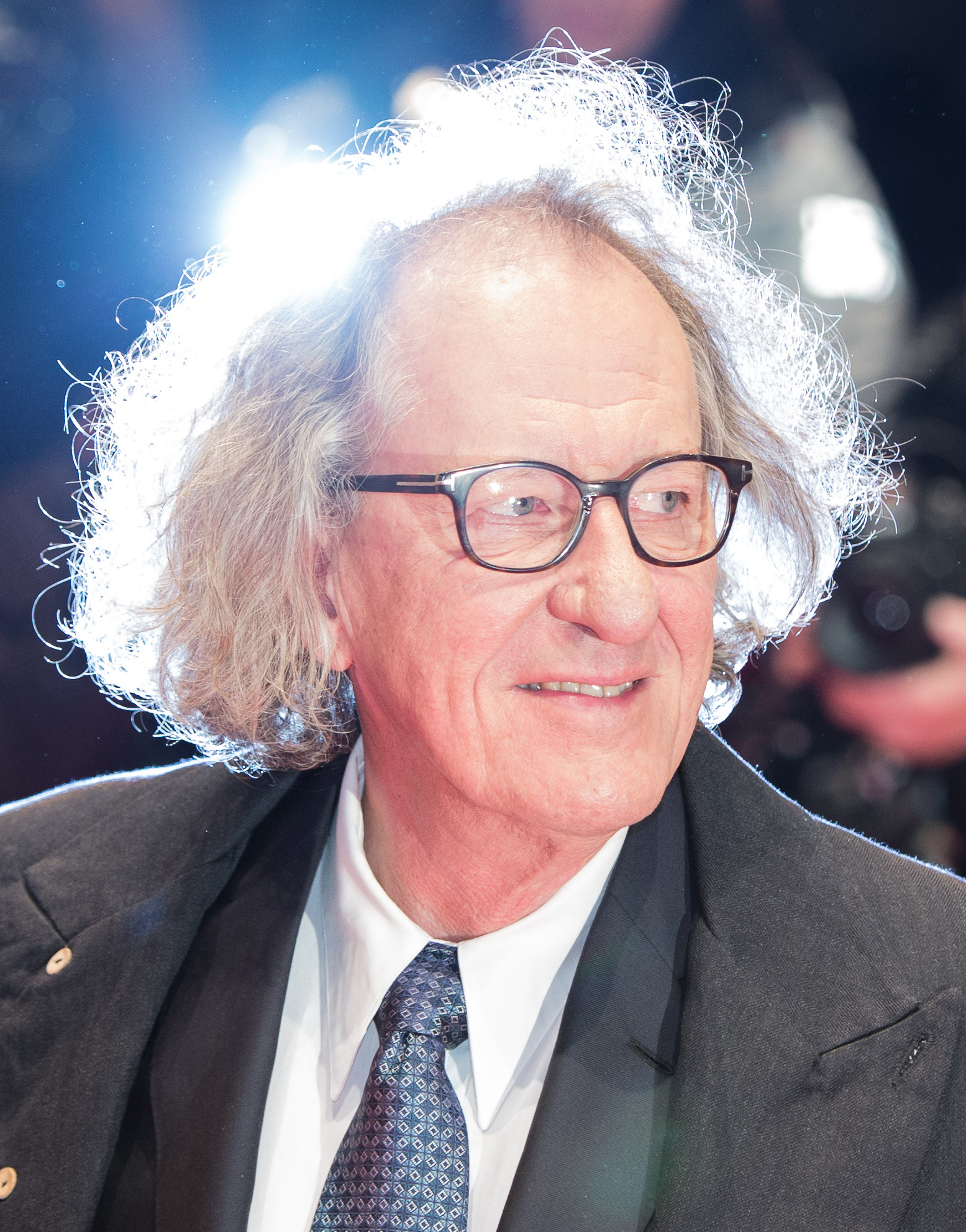
Geoffrey Rush

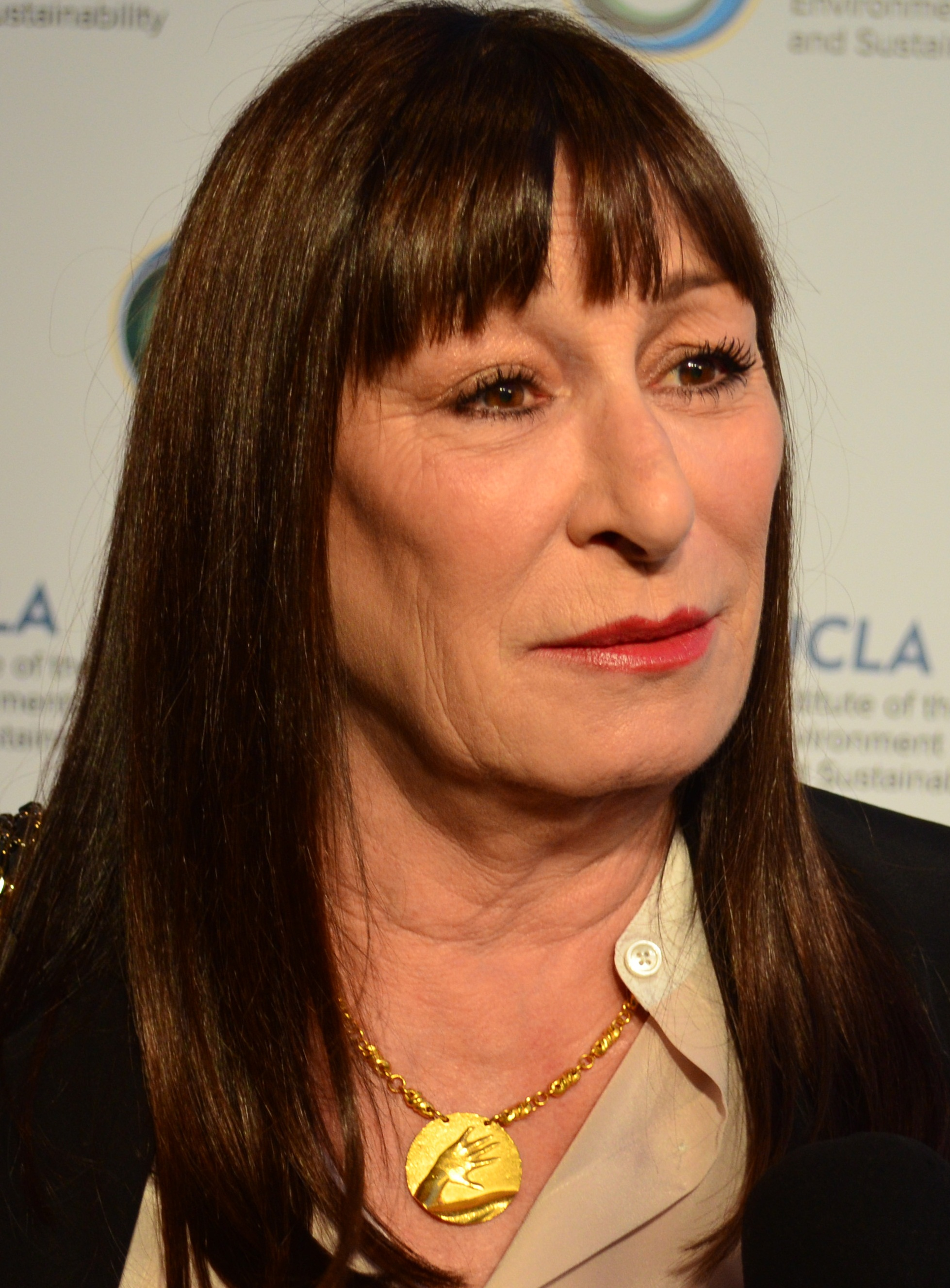
Anjelica Huston

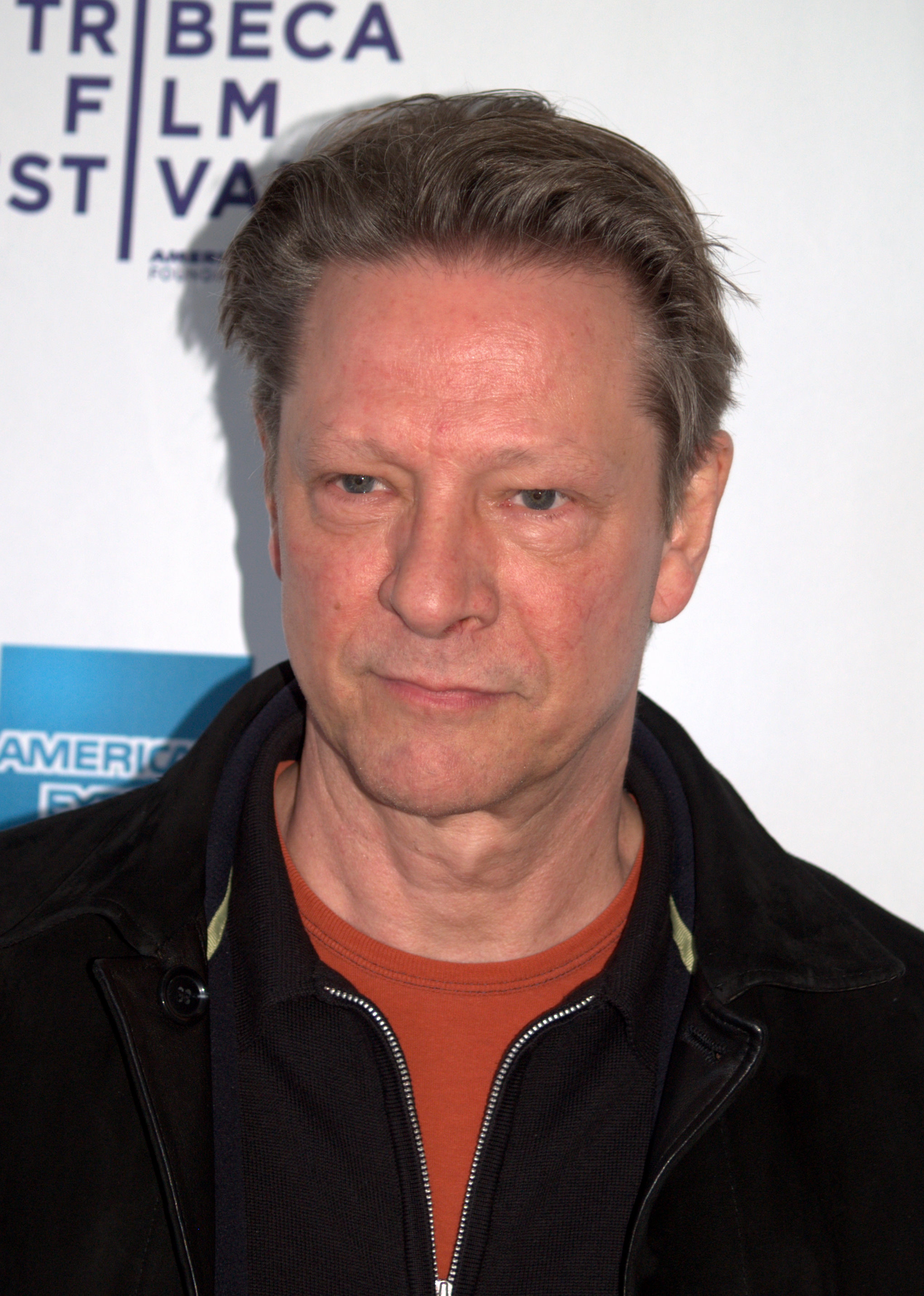
Chris Cooper

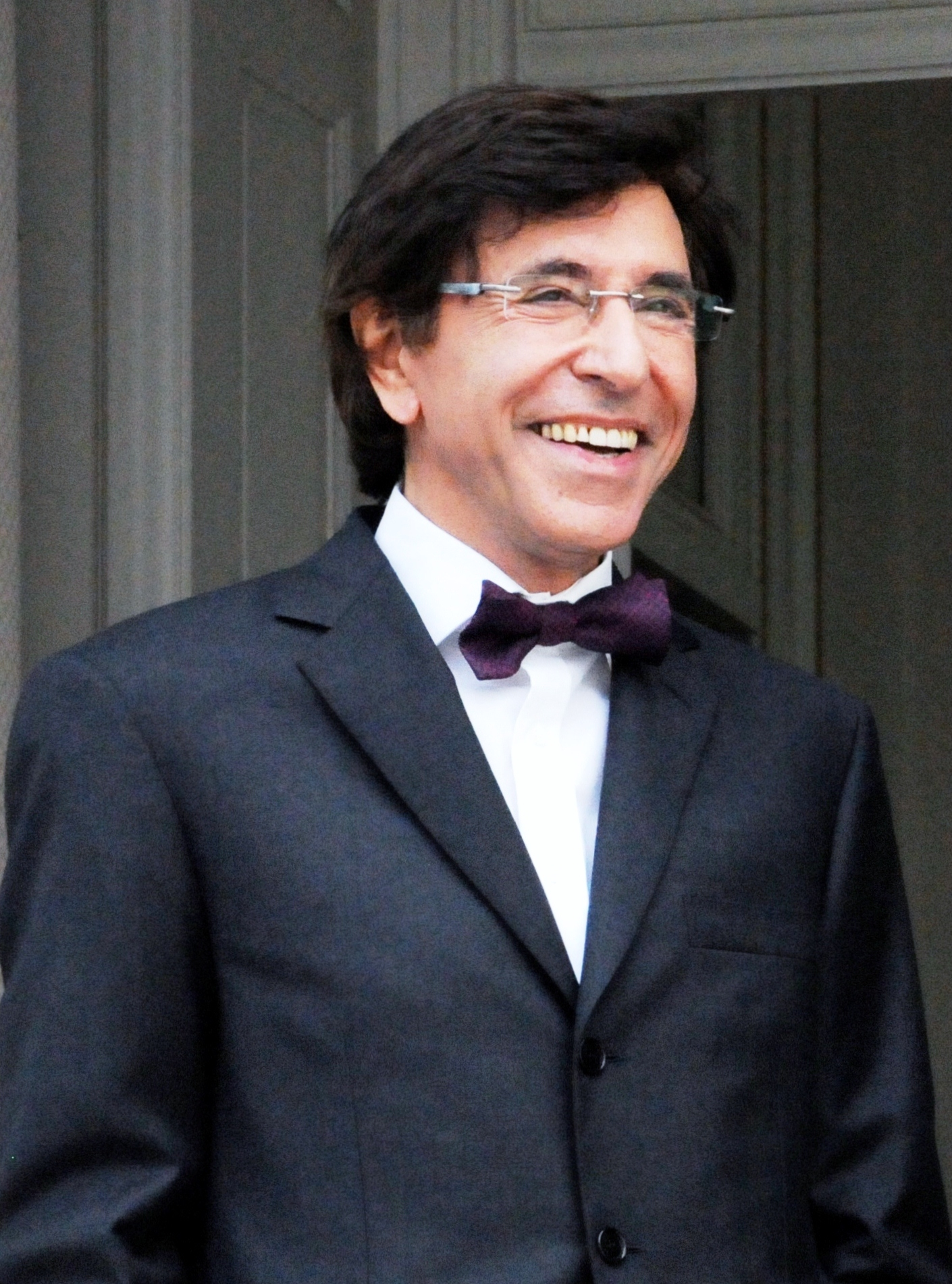
Elio Di Rupo

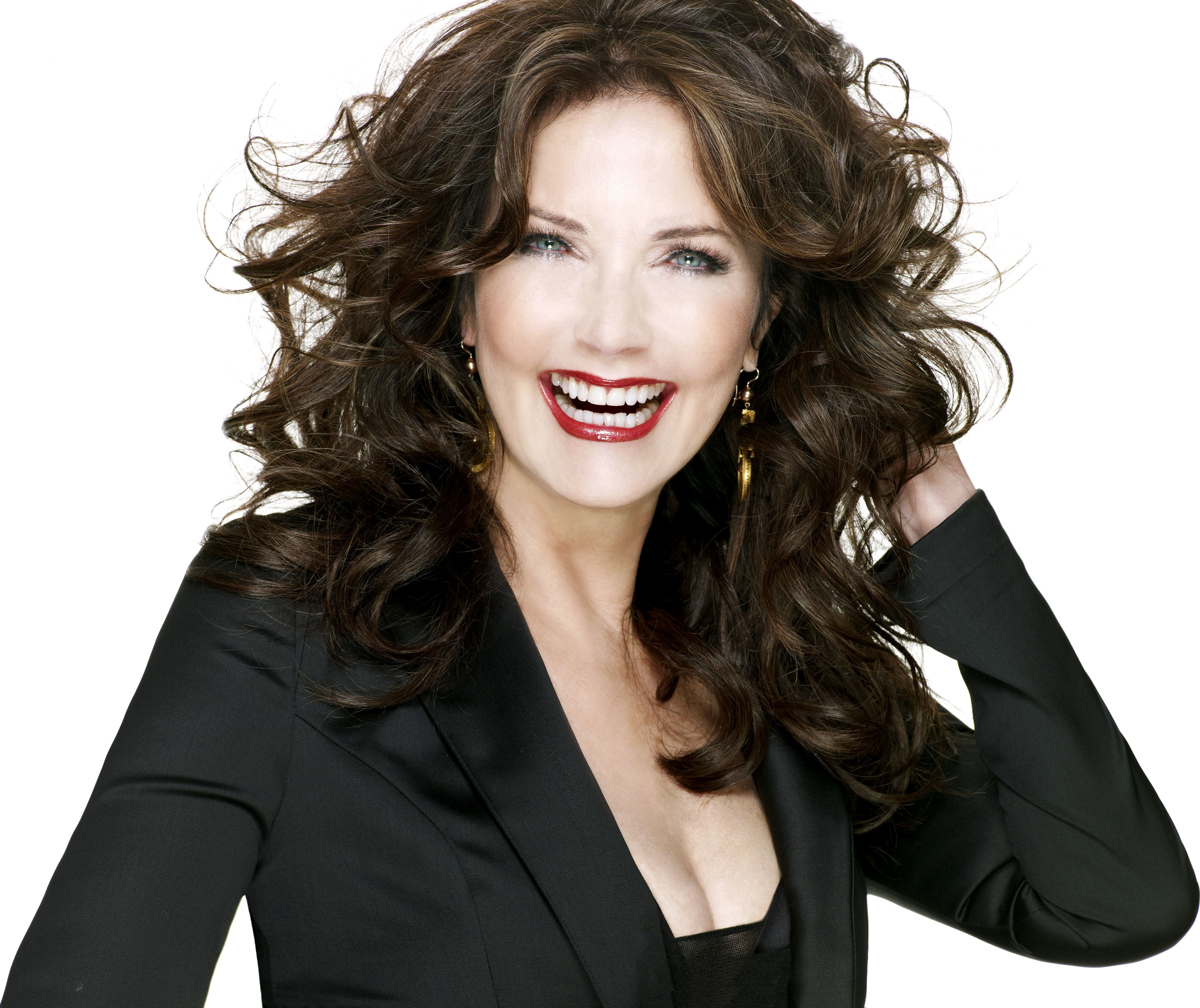
Lynda Carter

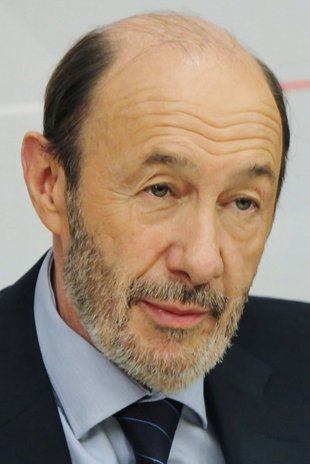
Alfredo Pérez Rubalcaba

- July 1
  - Sabah Abdul-Jalil, Iraqi footballer and coach (d. 2021)
  - Abdul Karim Jassim, Iraqi footballer and coach
  - Abdoulkader Kamil Mohamed, Djiboutian politician
  - Thomas Boni Yayi, 7th President of Benin
- July 2
  - Elisabeth Brooks, Canadian actress (d. 1997)
  - Wiesław Gawlikowski, Polish sport shooter
- July 3
  - Richard Hadlee, New Zealand cricketer
  - Lodewijk Jacobs, Dutch sprint canoer
- July 4
  - Beverly Boys, Canadian diver
  - S. S. Ahluwalia, Indian politician
- July 5
  - Goose Gossage, American baseball player
  - Yehoshua Gal, Israeli footballer
  - Gilbert Van Binst, Belgian footballer
- July 6 – Geoffrey Rush, Australian actor
- July 7 – Menachem Ben-Sasson, Israeli politician
- July 8 – Anjelica Huston, American actress
- July 9
  - Jeje Odongo, Ugandan military officer and politician
  - Chris Cooper, American actor
- July 12 – Cheryl Ladd, American actress and singer
- July 14 – Erich Hallhuber, German actor (d. 2003)
- July 15
  - Folorunso Alakija, Nigerian businesswoman
  - Rick Kehoe, Canadian professional ice hockey player and coach
- July 16 – Franco Serantini, Italian anarchist (d. 1972)
- July 18
  - Eva Wittke, German swimmer
  - Elio Di Rupo, Belgian politician
- July 21 – Robin Williams, American actor and comedian (d. 2014)
- July 24
  - Lynda Carter, American actress and singer
  - Chris Smith, British politician
- July 25 – Yury Kovalchuk, Russian oligarch
- July 26 – Sabine Leutheusser-Schnarrenberger, German politician
- July 28
  - Alfredo Pérez Rubalcaba, Spanish politician (d. 2019)
  - Santiago Calatrava, Spanish architect and engineer
- July 31
  - Evonne Goolagong Cawley, Australian tennis player
  - Vjekoslav Šutej, Croatian orchestral conductor (d. 2009)

=== August ===
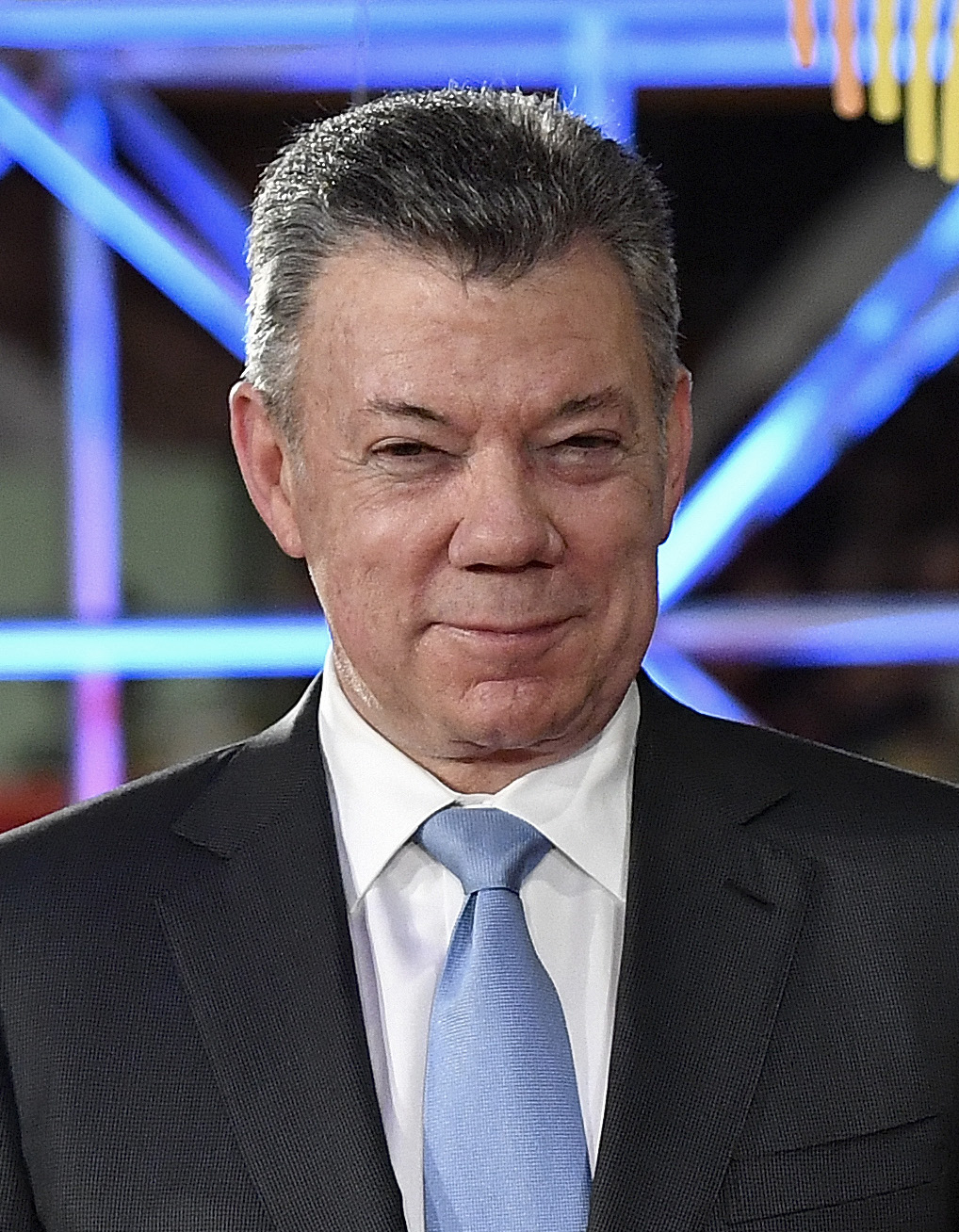
Juan Manuel Santos

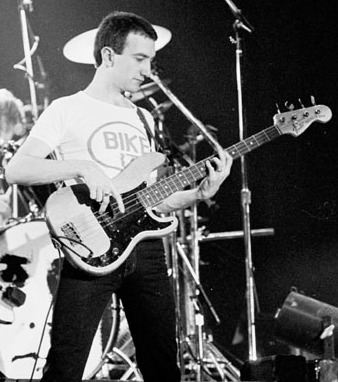
John Deacon

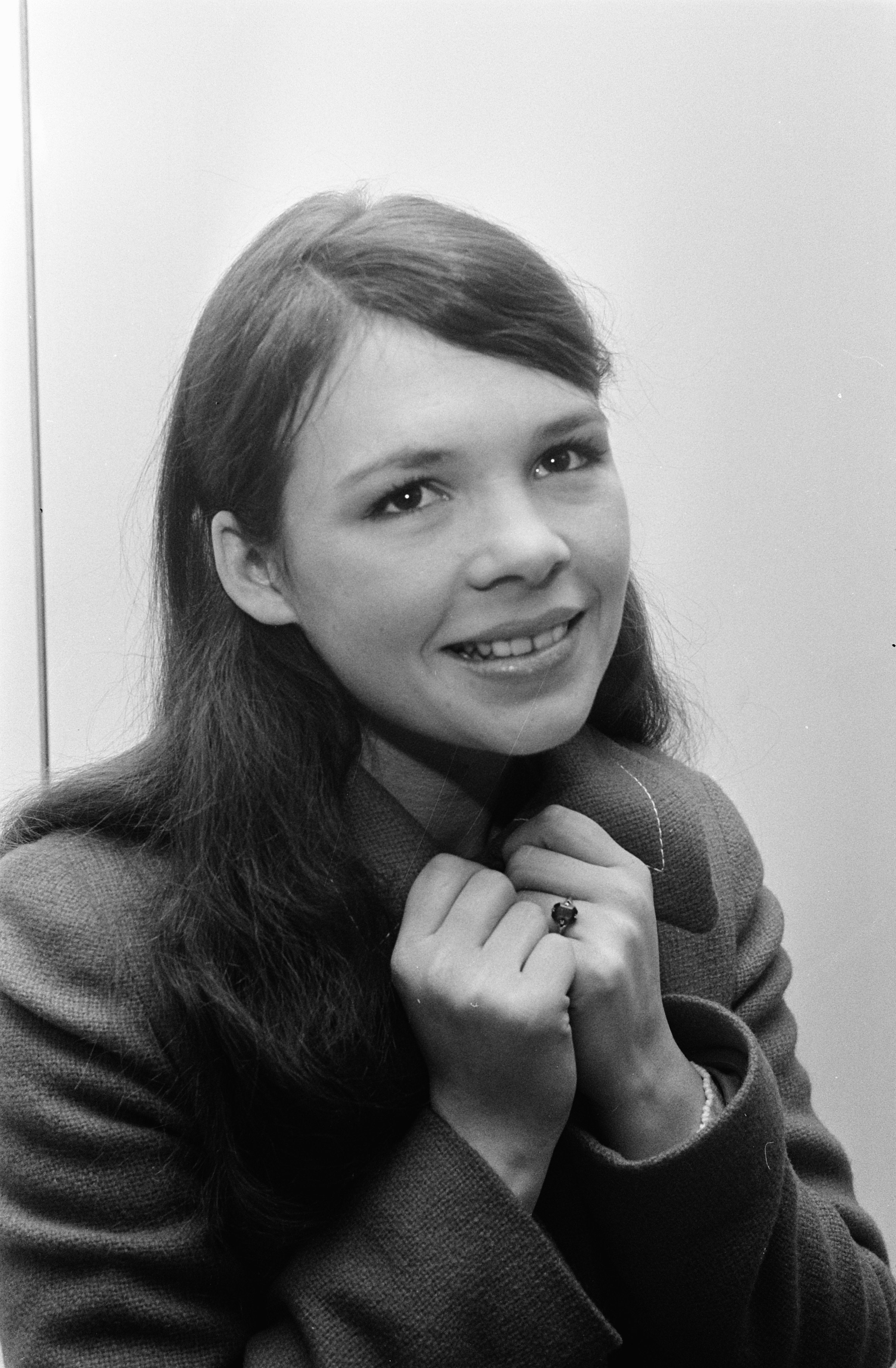
Dana

- August 2 – Andrew Gold, American singer-songwriter and musician (10cc, Wax) (d. 2011)
- August 3 – Marcel Dionne, Canadian hockey player
- August 6 – Catherine Hicks, American actress
- August 8
  - Louis van Gaal, Dutch footballer and manager
  - Mohamed Morsi, Egyptian politician, 5th President of Egypt (d. 2019)
  - Mamoru Oshii, Japanese film director
  - Randy Shilts, American journalist and author (d. 1994)
- August 10 – Juan Manuel Santos, President of Colombia and recipient of the Nobel Peace Prize
- August 11 – Katsumi Chō, Japanese voice actor
- August 13 – Dan Fogelberg, American singer, songwriter and multi-instrumentalist (d. 2007)
- August 14 – Carl Lumbly, American actor
- August 15 – Jim Allen, West Indian cricketer
- August 16 – Umaru Musa Yar'Adua, 13th President of Nigeria (d. 2010)
- August 19 – John Deacon, English rock bassist
- August 20 – Greg Bear, American author (d. 2022)
- August 21
  - Eric Goles, Chilean mathematician and computer scientist
  - Chesley V. Morton, American politician and securities arbitrator
- August 22 – Chandra Prakash Mainali, Nepalese politician
- August 23
  - Jimi Jamison, American musician (Survivor) (d. 2014)
  - Akhmad Kadyrov, President of Chechnya (d. 2004)
  - Queen Noor of Jordan, born Lisa Najeeb Halaby, American-born queen consort
- August 24 – Orson Scott Card, American writer
- August 25 – Rob Halford, English rock singer
- August 26 – Edward Witten, American mathematician, Fields medalist
- August 28 – Wayne Osmond, American pop singer (d. 2025)
- August 30
  - Behgjet Pacolli, 3rd President of Kosovo.
  - Dana Rosemary Scallon, Irish singer, Eurovision Song Contest 1970 winner and Member of the European Parliament (MEP)

=== September ===
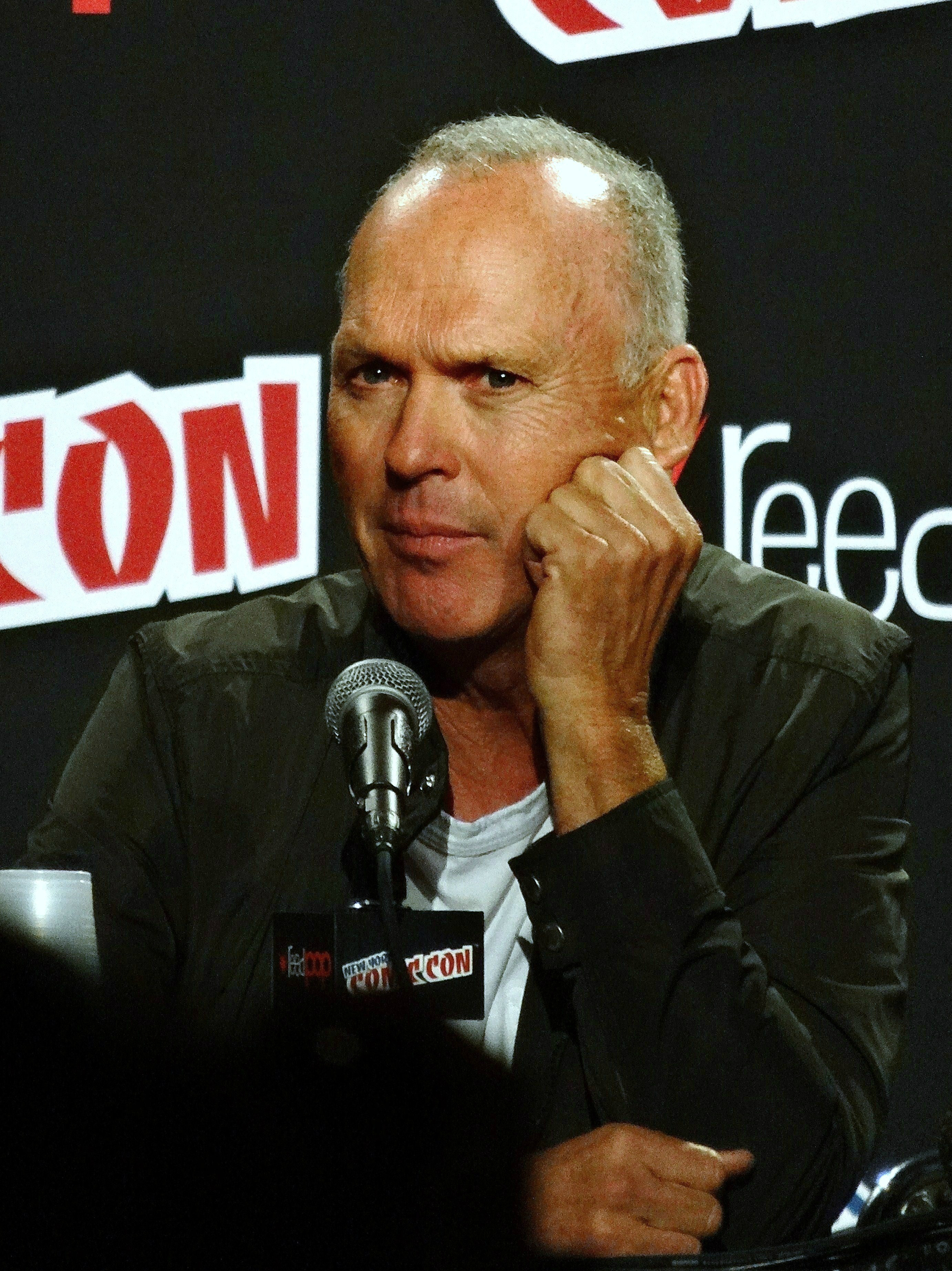
Michael Keaton

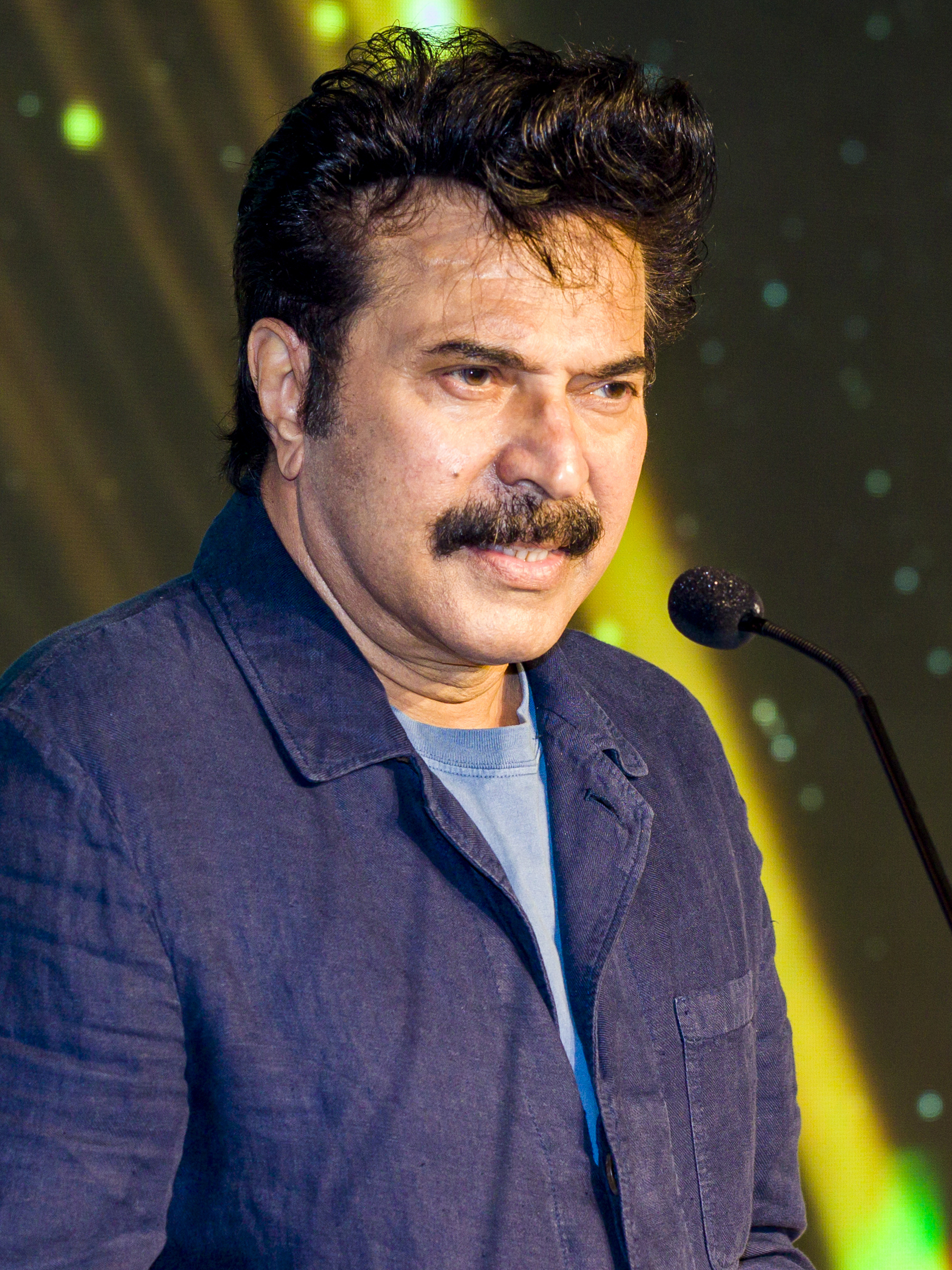
Mammootty

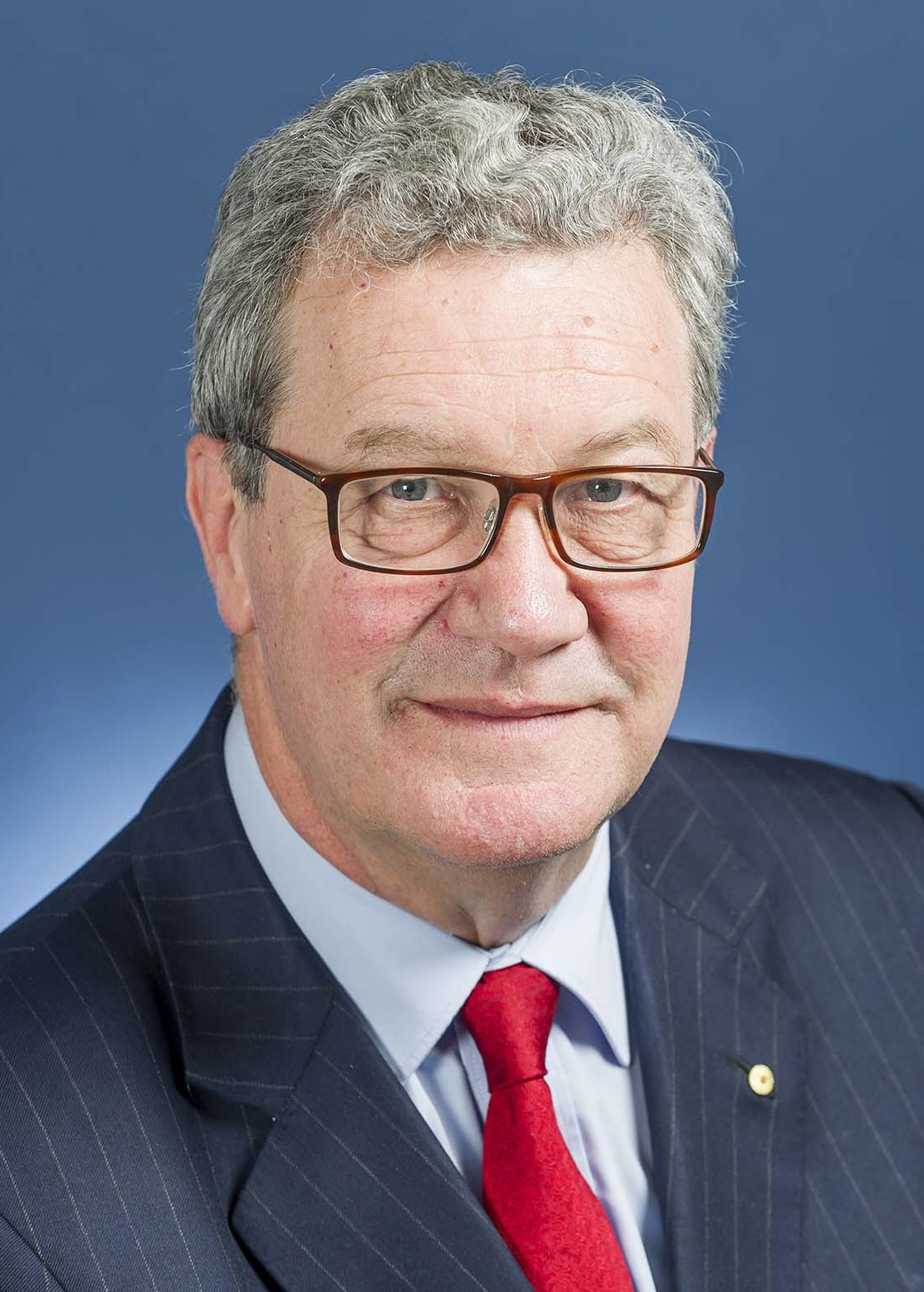
Alexander Downer

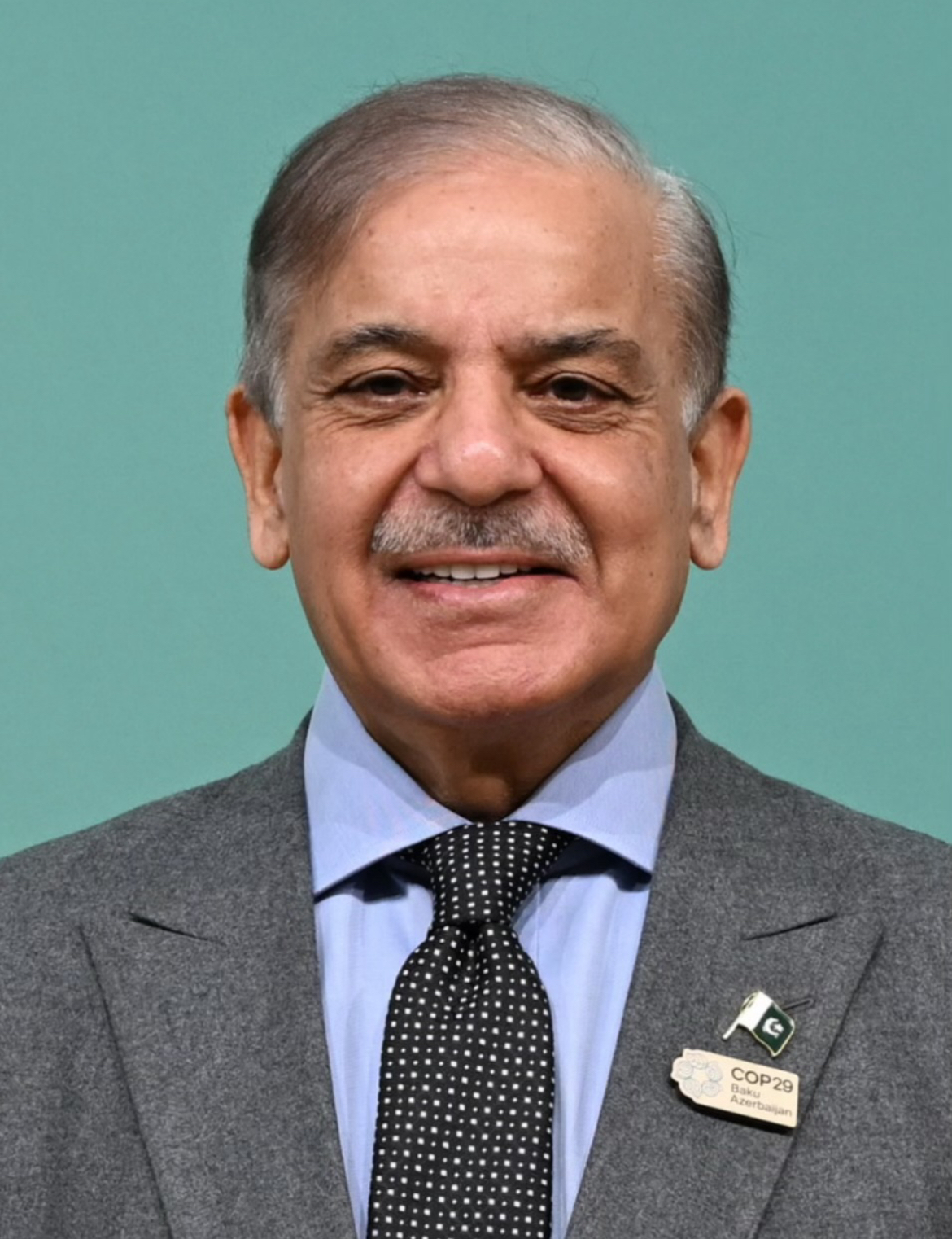
Shehbaz Sharif

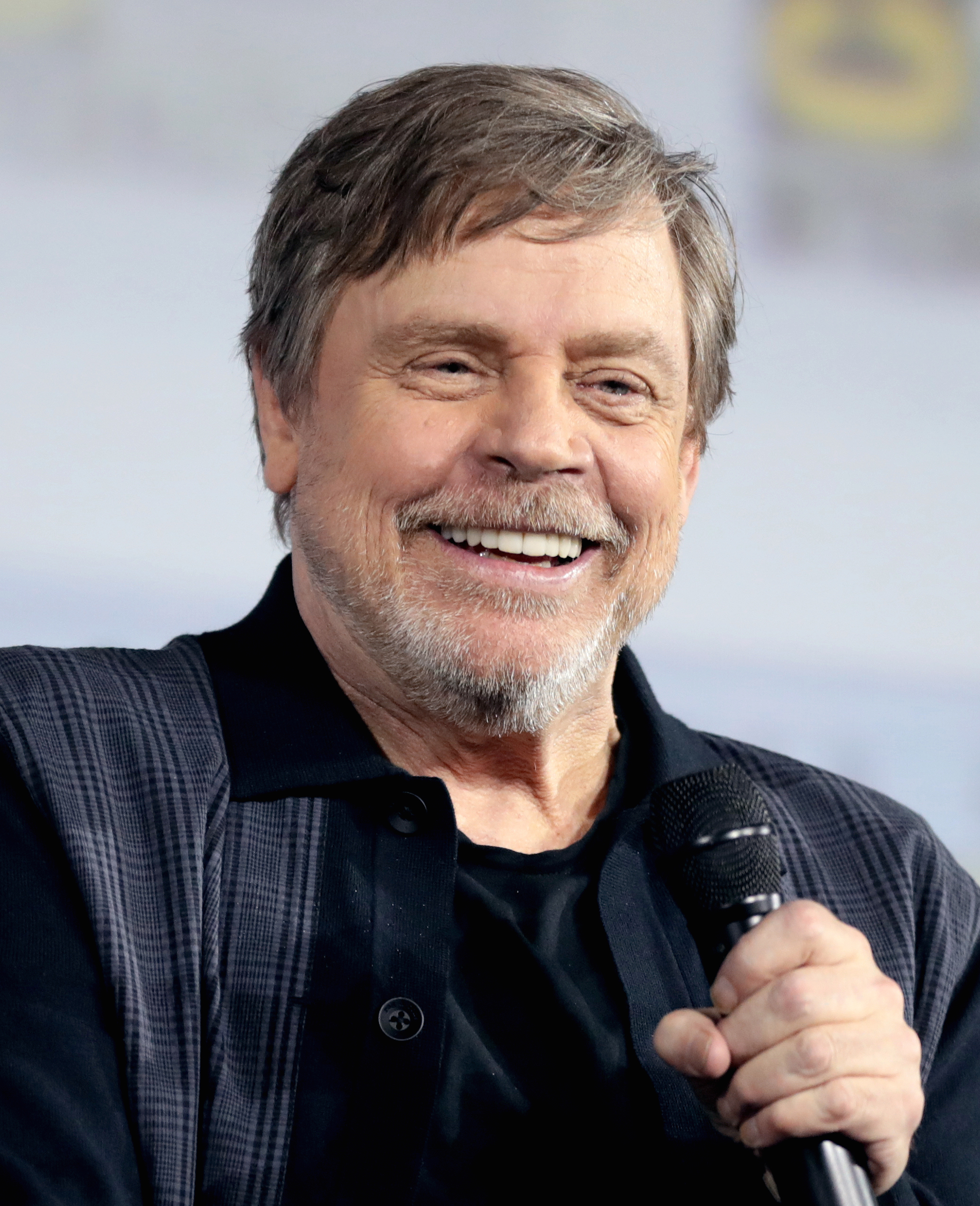
Mark Hamill

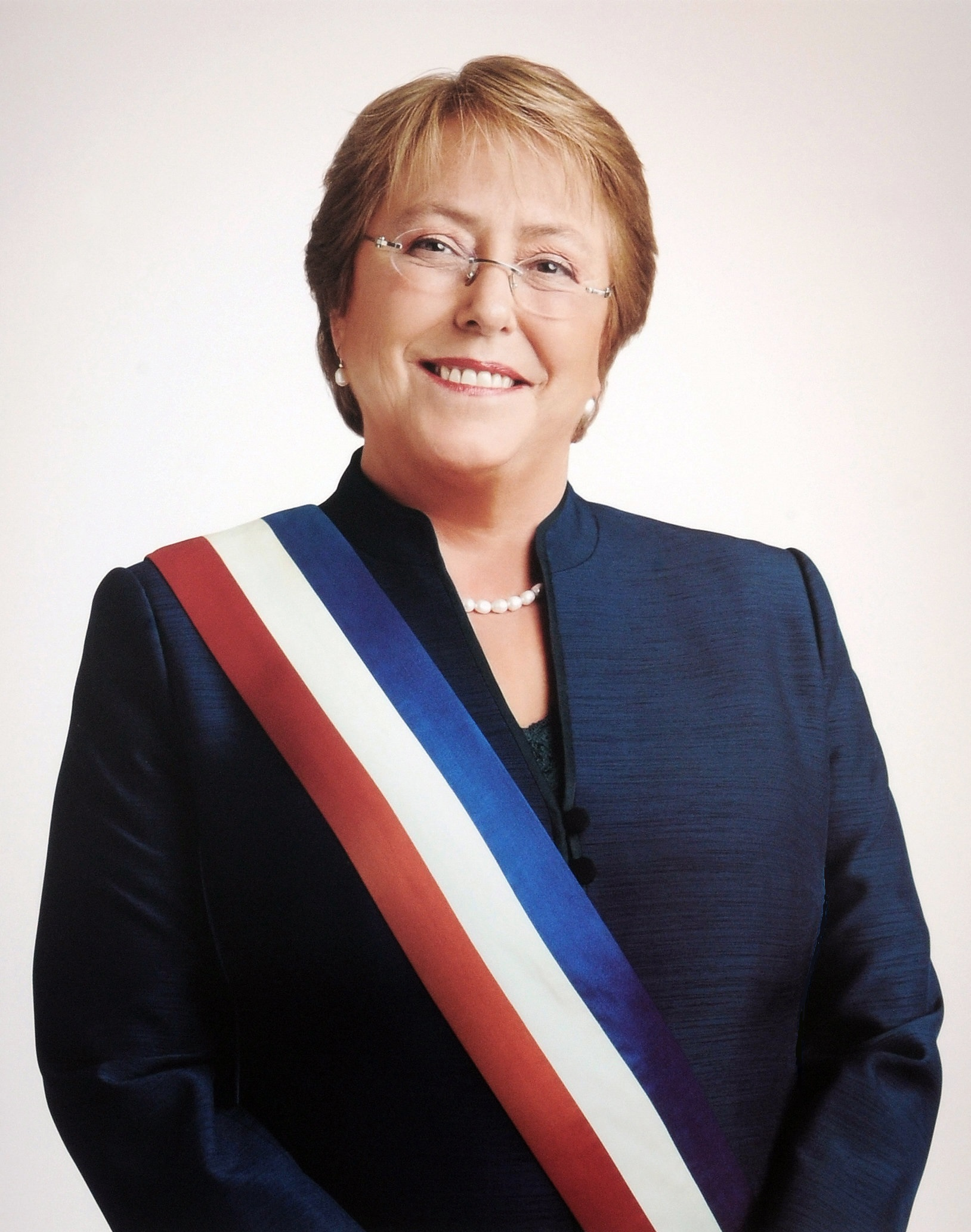
Michelle Bachelet

- September 2
  - Jim DeMint, American politician, United States Senator (R-SC)
  - Mark Harmon, American actor
- September 3 – D. Rolland Jennings, American politician
- September 4 – Judith Ivey, American actress
- September 5 – Michael Keaton, American actor
- September 7 – Chrissie Hynde, American rock singer
- September 7 - Mammootty, Indian actor
- September 9 – Alexander Downer, Australian politician, diplomat
- September 12
  - Bertie Ahern, Taoiseach of Ireland
  - Joe Pantoliano, American actor
- September 13
  - Jean Smart, American actress
  - Salva Kiir, 1st President of South Sudan
- September 14
  - Duncan Haldane, English-born condensed-matter physicist, recipient of the Nobel Prize in Physics
  - Volodymyr Melnykov, Ukrainian poet, writer, songwriter and composer
- September 15
  - Pete Carroll, American football coach
  - Fred Seibert, American producer and Frederator Studios founder
- September 17 – Cassandra Peterson, American actress, known for her role in Elvira, Mistress of the Dark
- September 18 – Dee Dee Ramone, American bassist (d. 2002)
- September 20
  - Guy Lafleur, Canadian hockey player (d. 2022)
  - Javier Marías, Spanish novelist (d. 2022)
- September 21 – Aslan Maskhadov, President of Chechnya (d. 2005)
- September 22
  - David Coverdale, English singer and musician
  - Wolfgang Petry, German singer
- September 23 – Shehbaz Sharif, Pakistani politician and businessman, Prime Minister of Pakistan (2022-present)
- September 24 – Alfonso Portillo, President of Guatemala
- September 25
  - Mark Hamill, American actor, known for his role in Star Wars
  - Bob McAdoo, American basketball player and coach
- September 26 – Stuart Tosh, Scottish musician
- September 28 – Jim Diamond, Scottish singer-songwriter (d. 2015)
- September 29
  - Michelle Bachelet, President of Chile
  - Andrés Caicedo, Colombian writer (d. 1977)
  - Maureen Caird, Australian hurdler
- September 30 – Barry Marshall, Australian physician and recipient of the Nobel Prize in Physiology or Medicine

=== October ===
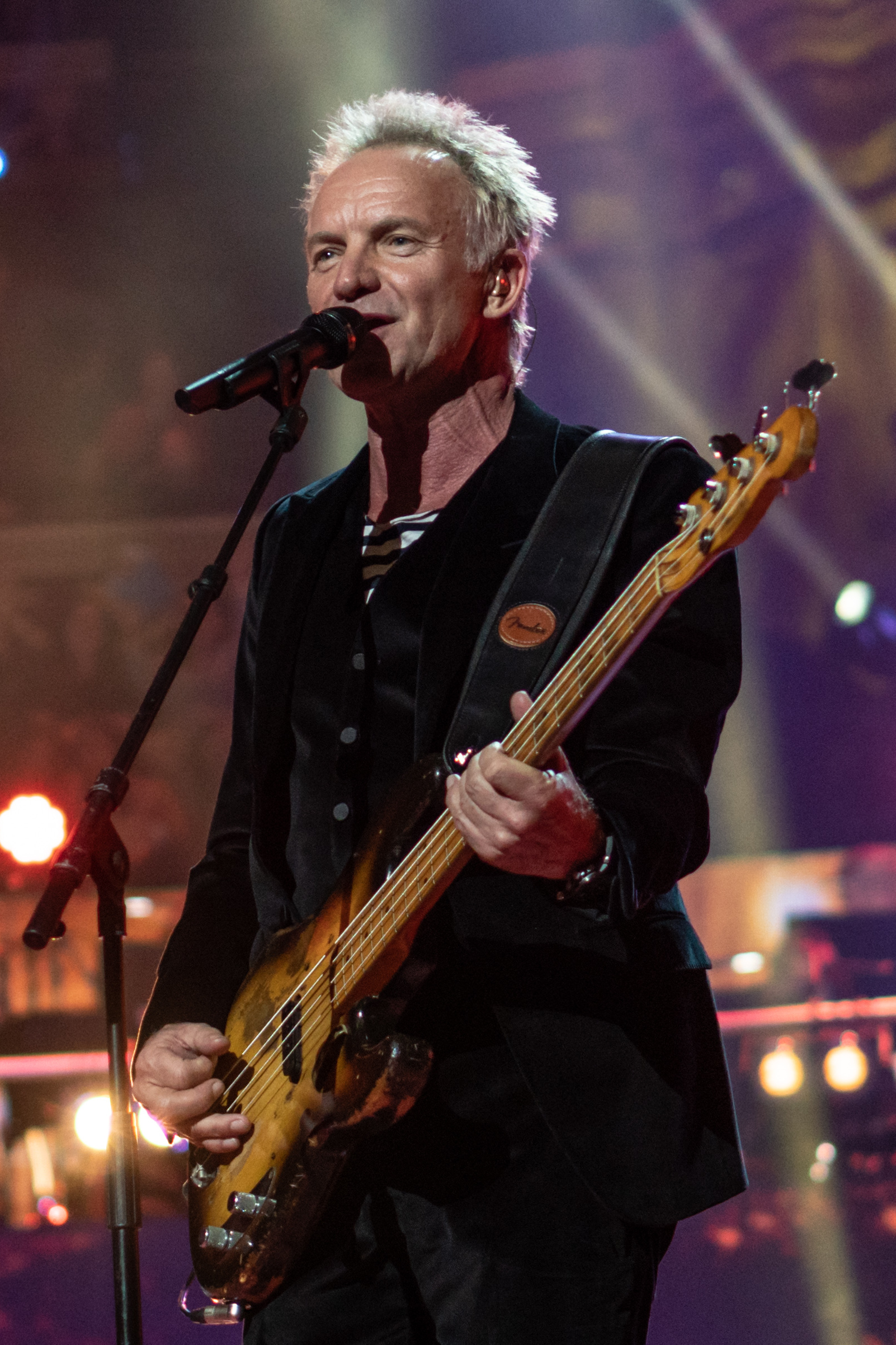
Sting

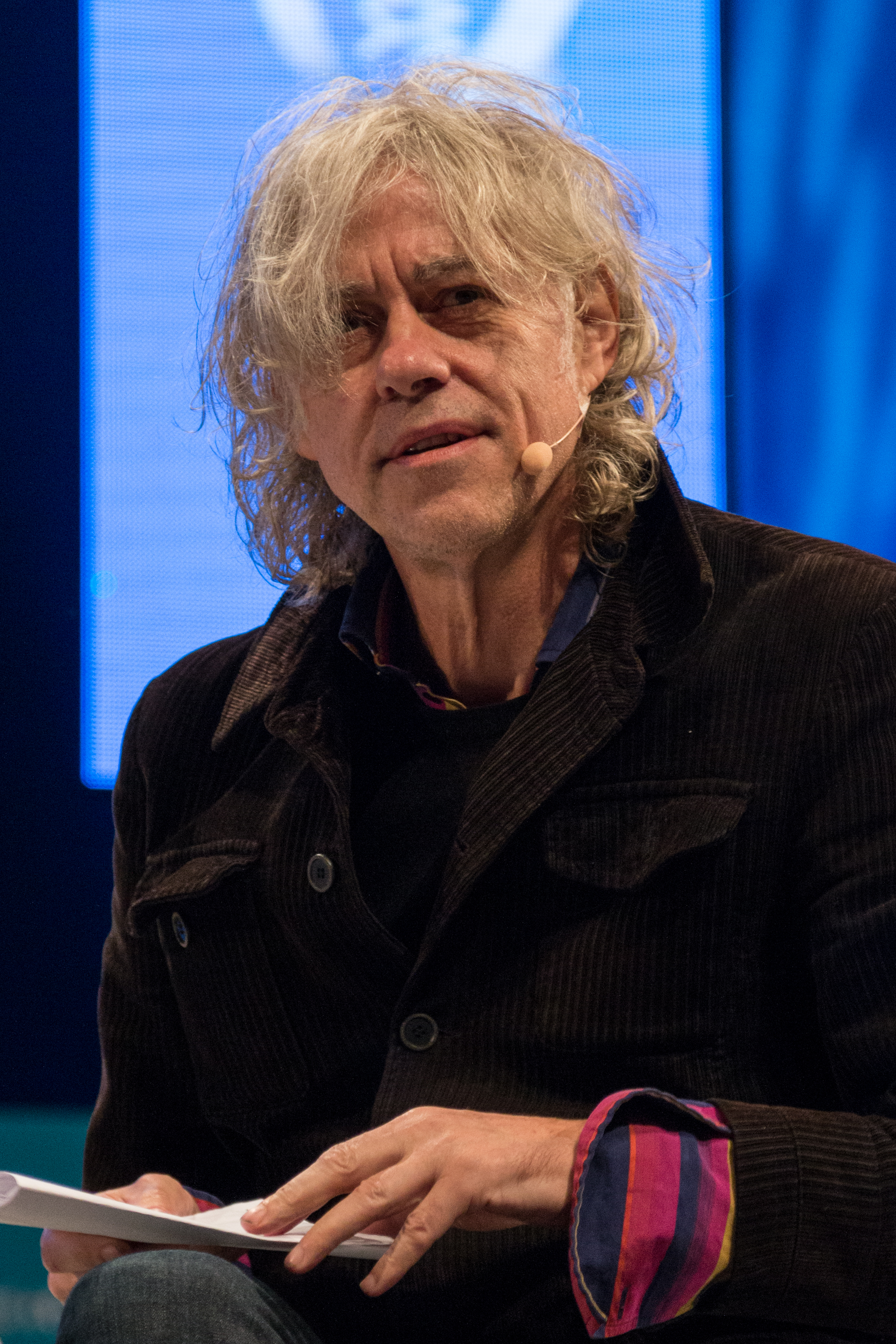
Bob Geldof

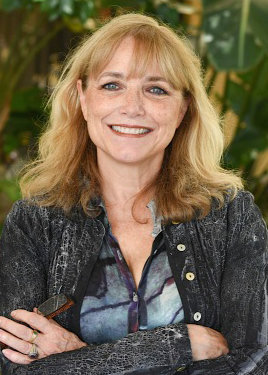
Karen Allen

Prabowo Subianto

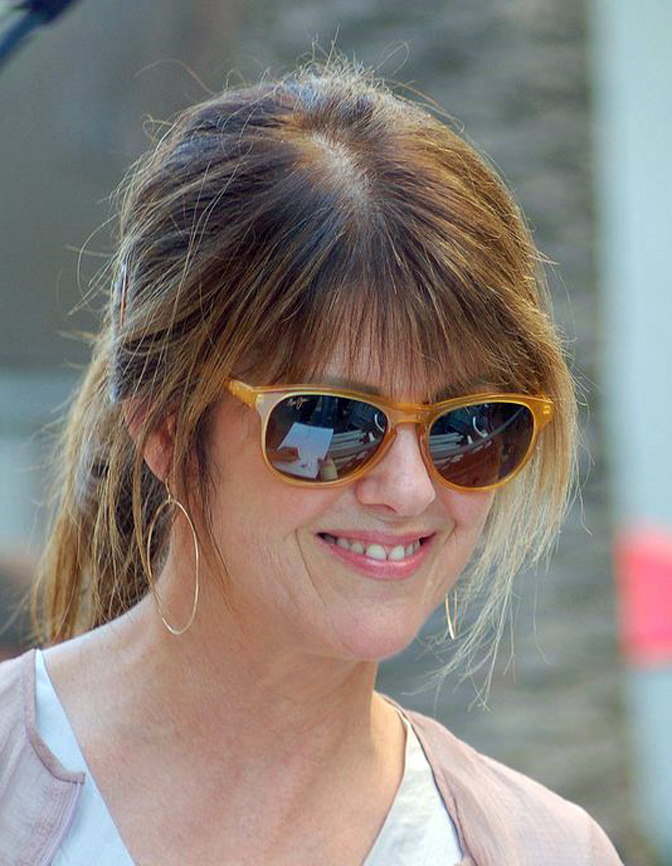
Pam Dawber

- October 2 – Sting, British singer, rock musician, philanthropist
- October 3
  - Keb' Mo', American musician
  - Kathryn D. Sullivan, American astronaut
  - Dave Winfield, American baseball player
- October 4 – Bakhytzhan Kanapyanov, Kazakh poet
- October 5 – Bob Geldof, Irish musician (The Boomtown Rats)
- October 6 – Manfred Winkelhock, German racing driver (d. 1985)
- October 7
  - Jakaya Kikwete, 4th President of Tanzania
  - John Mellencamp, American musician and songwriter
- October 10 – Epeli Ganilau, Fijian soldier and statesman (d. 2023)
- October 11
  - Jean-Jacques Goldman, French singer and songwriter
  - Jon Miller, American sports announcer
- October 15
  - Hani Al-Mulki, Prime Minister of Jordan
  - Rafael Vaganian, Armenian chess grandmaster
- October 17
  - Prabowo Subianto, Indonesian politician, businessman, retired honorary army general, 8th President of Indonesia.
- October 18
  - Pam Dawber, American actress
  - Mike Antonovich, American ice hockey player and executive
  - Terry McMillan, American author
- October 19 – Annie Golden, Americana actress
- October 20 – Claudio Ranieri, Italian football manager and player
- October 22 – William David Sanders, American victim of the Columbine High School massacre (d. 1999)
- October 23 – Charly García, Argentine musician and songwriter
- October 26
  - Willie P. Bennett, Canadian songwriter and singer (d. 2008)
  - Bootsy Collins, American musician, singer-songwriter
- October 27 – Éric Morena, French singer (d. 2019)
- October 30 – Harry Hamlin, American actor

=== November ===
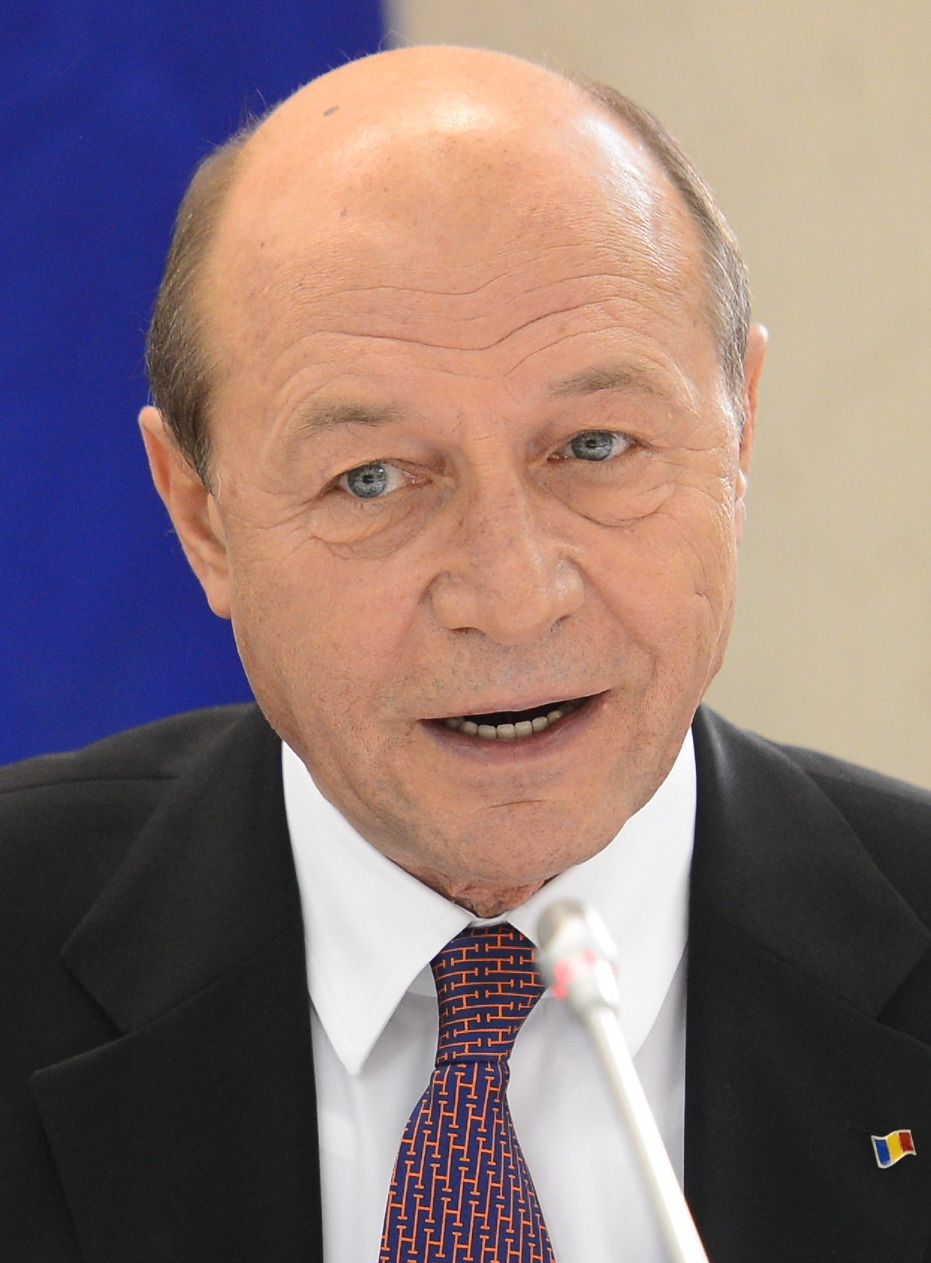
Traian Băsescu

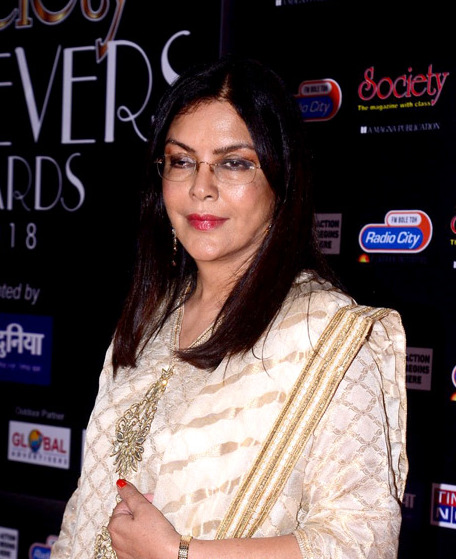
Zeenat Aman

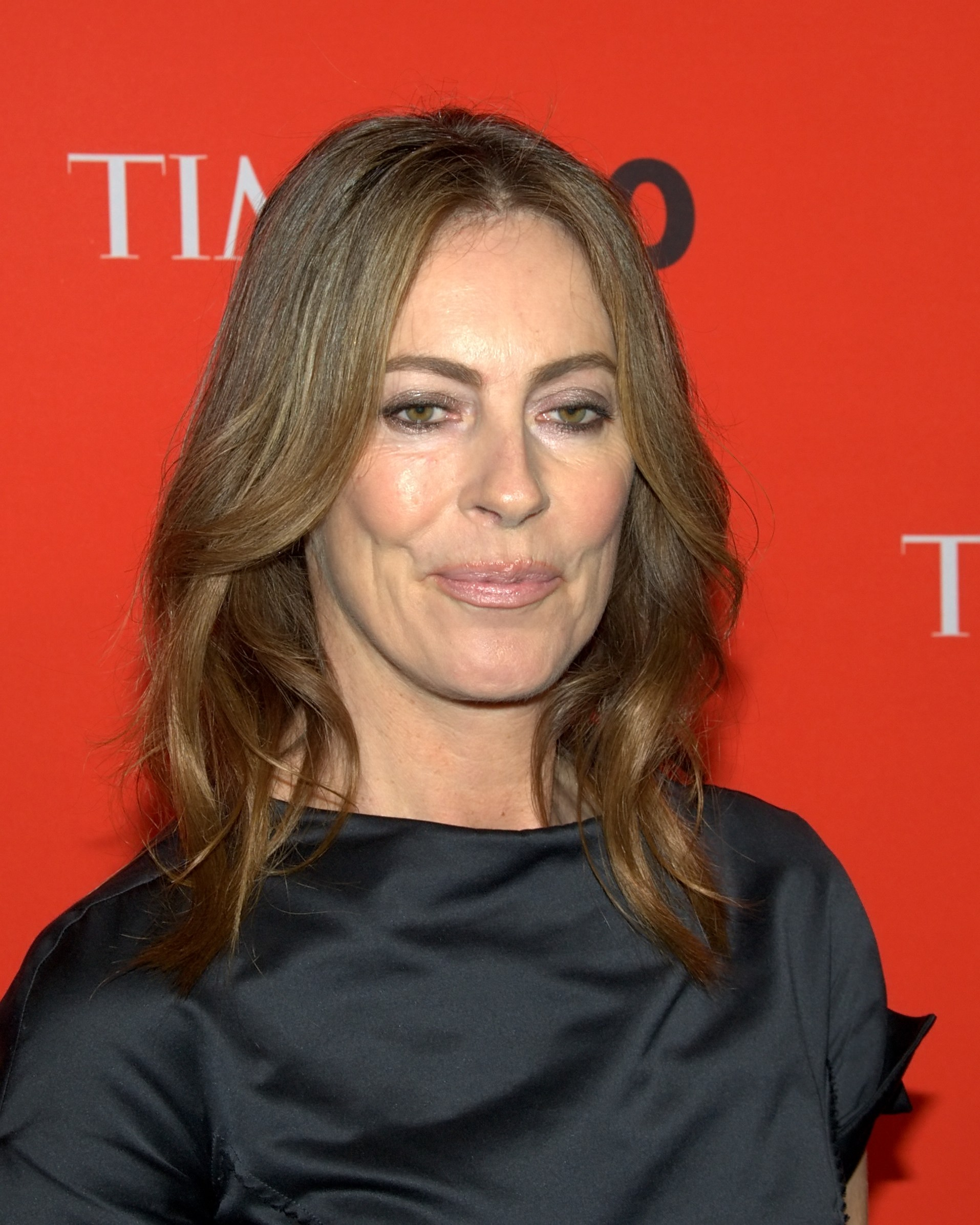
Kathryn Bigelow

- November 2 – Thomas Mallon, American author and critic
- November 3 – Ed Murawinski, American cartoonist (New York Daily News)
- November 4
  - Traian Băsescu, President of Romania
  - Hal Malchow, political consultant (d. 2024)
- November 5
  - Prince B.B Apugo, Nigerian politician
  - Tony Evers, American politician, 46th Governor of Wisconsin
- November 7 – Dennis Allen, Australian criminal and drug dealer, eldest son of Kath Pettingill (d. 1987)
- November 8 – Alfredo Astiz, Argentine commander
- November 9
  - Martin Khor, Malaysian journalist and economist (d. 2020)
  - Lou Ferrigno, American actor and bodybuilder
- November 10 – Danilo Medina, Dominican politician 53rd President of the Dominican Republic
- November 11 – Marc Summers, American television host and producer
- November 12 – Marcelo Rezende, Brazilian journalist and television presenter (d. 2017)
- November 15
  - Alamgir Hashmi, English poet
  - Beverly D'Angelo, American actress and singer
- November 16
  - Miguel Sandoval, American actor
  - Paula Vogel, American playwright
- November 17 – Stephen Root, American actor
- November 18 – Justin Raimondo, American political activist (d. 2019)
- November 19 – Charlie Falconer, Baron Falconer of Thoroton, British politician
- November 20 – Rodger Bumpass, American voice actor known for his role as Squidward Tentacles on SpongeBob SquarePants
- November 21 – Thomas Roth, German television news anchor and presenter
- November 24 – Chet Edwards, American politician
- November 26 – Cicciolina, Hungarian-Italian actress and politician
- November 27 – Teri DeSario, American singer-songwriter
- November 29
  - Kathryn Bigelow, American film director
  - Roger Troutman, American funk musician (d. 1999)
- November 30 – Christian Bernard, French-born mystic

=== December ===
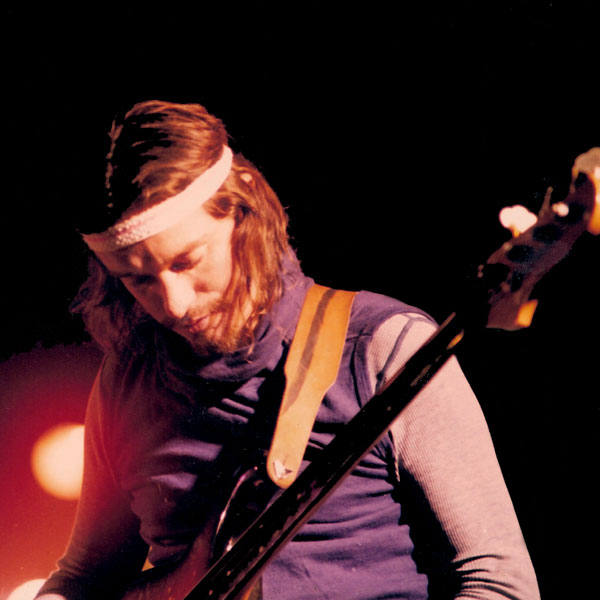
Jaco Pastorius

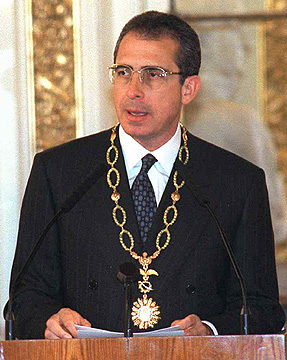
Ernesto Zedillo

- December 1
  - Obba Babatundé, American actor
  - Jaco Pastorius, American bassist (d. 1987)
  - Treat Williams, American actor, writer and aviator (d. 2023)
- December 2 – Adrian Devine, American baseball pitcher (d. 2020)
- December 3
  - Natalis Chan, Hong Kong actor and producer
  - Riki Choshu, Korean-Japanese professional wrestler
- December 4
  - Chang Fei, Taiwanese television personality
  - Patricia Wettig, American actress
- December 7 – Richard Darbois, French-Canadian voice actor
- December 8
  - Bill Bryson, American-born British non-fiction author
  - Jan Eggum, Norwegian singer and songwriter
- December 11 – Peter T. Daniels, American writing systems scholar
- December 12 – Wau Holland, German hacker (d. 2001)
- December 14
  - Mike Krüger, German comedian and singer
  - Jan Timman, Dutch chess player (d. 2026)
- December 17 – Ken Hitchcock, Canadian hockey coach
- December 27 – Levy Fidelix, Brazilian politician, businessman, and journalist (d. 2021)
  - Ernesto Zedillo, 54th President of Mexico (1994–2000)

=== Full date unknown ===
- Peter Hargitay, public relations executive and a partner of the European Consultancy Network
- Martani Huseini, Indonesian academic and bureaucrat

== Deaths ==
=== January ===
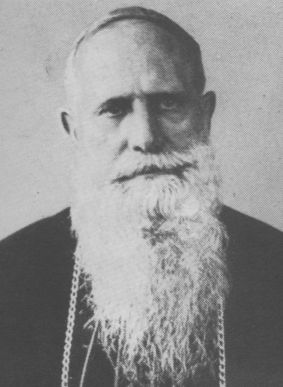
Reverend Franziskus Hennemann

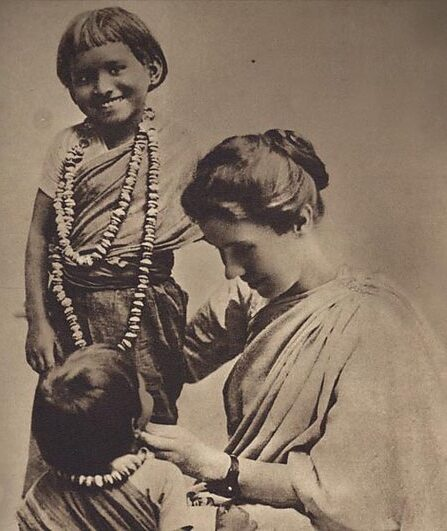
Amy Carmichael

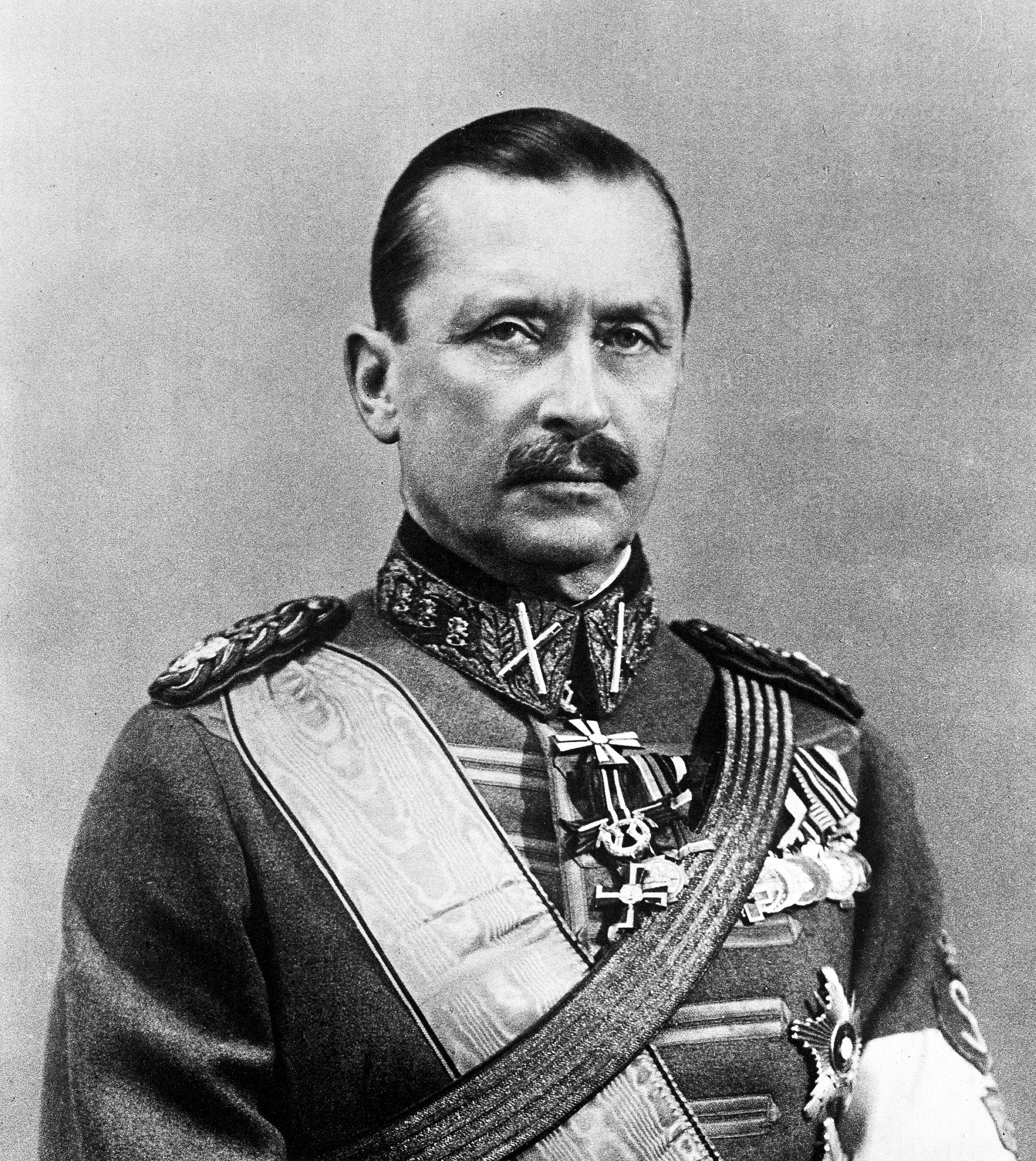
Carl Gustaf Emil Mannerheim

- January 3 – Georgios Drossinis, Greek author, poet, scholar and editor (b. 1859)
- January 5
  - Yasunosuke Gonda, Japanese sociologist and theorist (b. 1887)
  - Andrei Platonov, Russian-born Soviet writer (b. 1899)
- January 6
  - Ken Le Breton, Australian speedway rider (b. 1924)
  - Maila Talvio, Finnish writer, nominated for the Nobel Prize in Literature (b. 1871)
- January 7
  - René Guénon, French metaphysician (b. 1886)
  - Lucien Cuénot, French biologist (b. 1866)
- January 10 – Sinclair Lewis, American writer, Nobel Prize laureate (b. 1885)
- January 12
  - Jacques de Baroncelli, French director and screenwriter (b. 1881)
  - Prince Maximilian of Saxony (b. 1870)
- January 13
  - Dorothea Bate, British palaeontologist, a pioneer of archaeozoology (b. 1878)
  - Florence Kahn, American actress (b. 1878)
  - Francesco Marchetti Selvaggiani, Italian Roman Catholic cardinal and eminence (b. 1871)
- January 15 – Sir Ernest Swinton, British Army general (b. 1868)
- January 16 – Tsunejirō Ishii, Japanese admiral (b. 1887)
- January 17 – Franziskus Hennemann, South African Titular bishop and reverend (b. 1882)
- January 18
  - Amy Carmichael, Irish missionary to India (b. 1867)
  - Jack Holt, American actor (b. 1888)
- January 21 – Yuriko Miyamoto, Japanese novelist (b. 1899)
- January 22 – Harald Bohr, Danish mathematician and footballer (b. 1887)
- January 23 – Robert J. Blackham, British general and author (b. 1868)
- January 27 – Carl Gustaf Emil Mannerheim, Finnish military leader and statesman, 6th President of Finland (b. 1867)
- January 28
  - Dominic Salvatore Gentile, American pilot (b. 1920)
  - Petar Dujam Munzani, Italian Roman Catholic archbishop and reverend (b. 1890)
- January 29 – Frank Tarrant, Australian cricketer (b. 1880)
- January 30 – Ferdinand Porsche, German auto engineer (b. 1875)

=== February ===
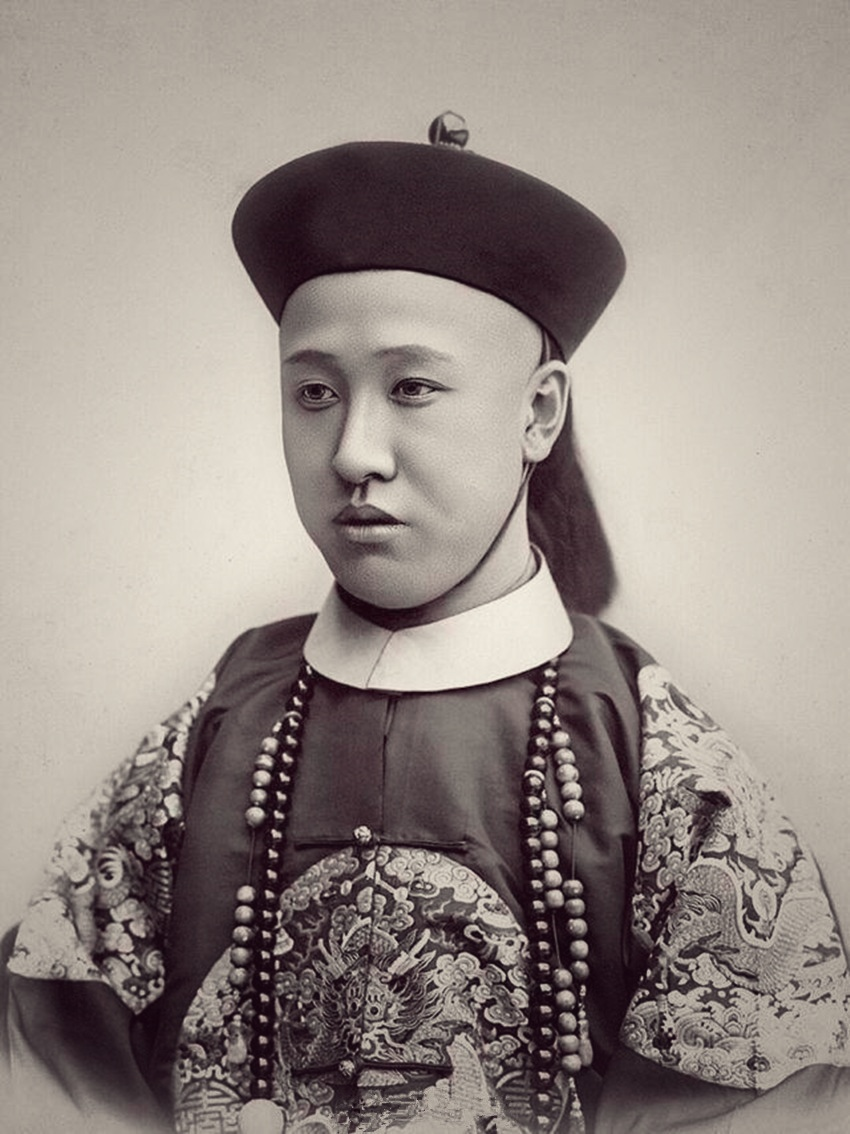
Zaifeng, Prince Chun

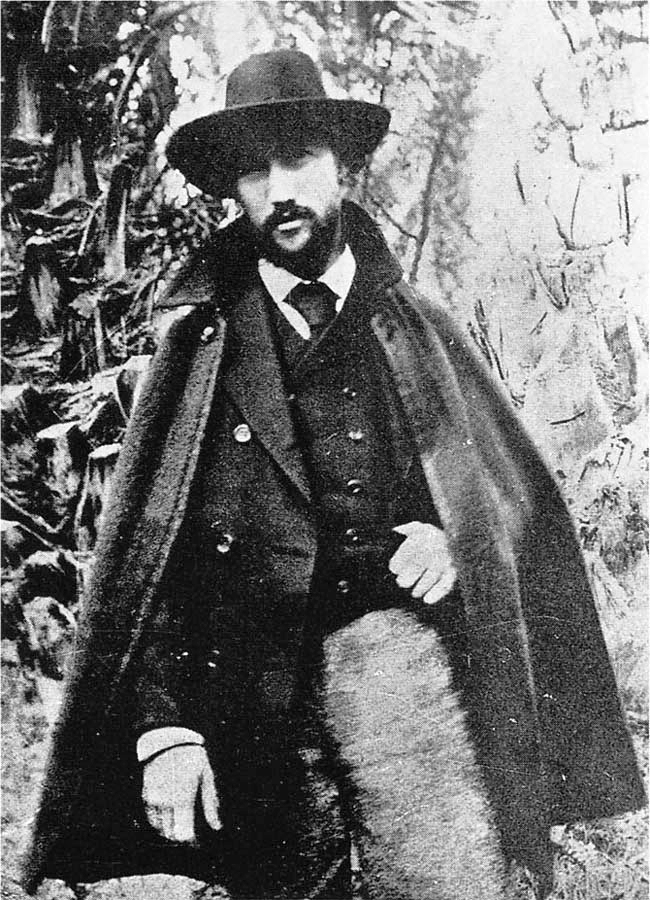
André Gide

- February 1 – Blas Taracena Aguirre, Spanish archaeologist (b. 1895)
- February 3
  - Choudhry Rahmat Ali, one of the founding fathers of Pakistan (b. 1895)
  - Zaifeng, Prince Chun, Qing Dynasty prince (b. 1883)
- February 8
  - Fritz Thyssen, German businessman and industrialist (b. 1873)
  - Zygmunt Szendzielarz, Polish commander (b. 1910)
- February 9 – Eddy Duchin, American pianist and bandleader (b. 1909)
- February 13 – Lloyd C. Douglas, American author (b. 1877)
- February 14 – Andrés Barbero, Paraguayan scientist and botanist (b. 1877)
- February 18
  - Lyman Gilmore, American aviation pioneer (b. 1874)
  - Miloš Slovák, Czech painter (b. 1885)
- February 19 – André Gide, French writer, Nobel Prize laureate (b. 1869)
- February 22 – Alfred Lindley, American Olympic rower - Men's eights (b. 1904)
- February 28
  - Henry W. Armstrong, American boxer and songwriter (b. 1879)
  - Giannina Russ, Italian soprano (b. 1873)

=== March ===
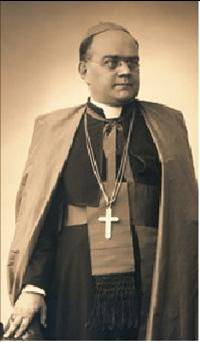
Blessed Zoltán Meszlényi

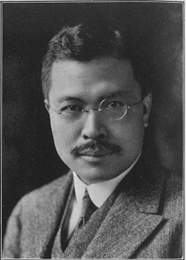
Kijuro Shidehara

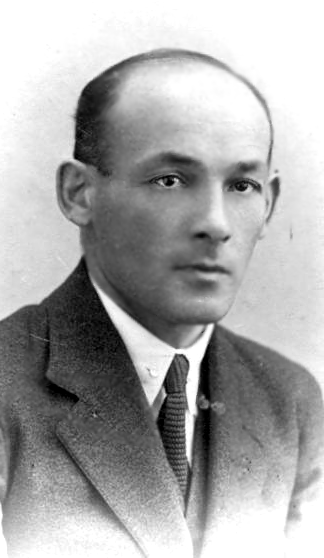
Janusz Jędrzejewicz

- March 1 – Maria Dickin, British social reformer (b. 1870)
- March 2
  - Cassiano Conzatti, Italian botanist, explorer and pteridologist (b. 1862)
  - Al Taylor, American actor (b. 1887)
- March 4
  - Anna Berentine Anthoni, Norwegian trade unionist and politician (b. 1884)
  - Zoltán Meszlényi, Hungarian Roman Catholic priest, bishop, martyr and blessed (b. 1892)
- March 6
  - Ivor Novello, British actor, musician and composer (b. 1893)
  - Volodymyr Vynnychenko, Ukrainian statesman, political activist, writer, playwright and artist, 1st Prime Minister of Ukraine (b. 1880)
- March 7 – Prince Rangsit Prayurasakdi (b. 1885)
- March 8 – Charles Coleman, American actor (b. 1885)
- March 10 – Kijūrō Shidehara, Japanese diplomat, 31st Prime Minister of Japan (b. 1872)
- March 12 – Alfred Hugenberg, German businessman and politician (b. 1865)
- March 13 – Ants "the Terrible" Kaljurand, Estonian anti-communist, freedom fighter and forest brother (b. 1917)
- March 14 – Val Lewton, American producer and screenwriter (b. 1904)
- March 16 – Janusz Jędrzejewicz, Polish politician and educator, 24th Prime Minister of Poland (b. 1885)
- March 17 – Archduke Karl Albrecht of Austria (b. 1888)
- March 19
  - Dmytro Doroshenko, Soviet political figure (b. 1882)
  - Jacob Christiaan Koningsberger, Dutch biologist and politician (b. 1867)
- March 20 – Alfredo Baquerizo, 19th President of Ecuador (b. 1859)
- March 21 – Willem Mengelberg, Dutch conductor (b. 1871)
- March 24 – José Enrique Varela, Spanish military officer (b. 1871)
- March 25
  - Eddie Collins, American baseball player (Chicago White Sox) and a member of the MLB Hall of Fame (b. 1887)
  - Oscar Micheaux, American filmmaker (b. 1884)
- March 31 – Ralph Forbes, American actor (b. 1896)

=== April ===
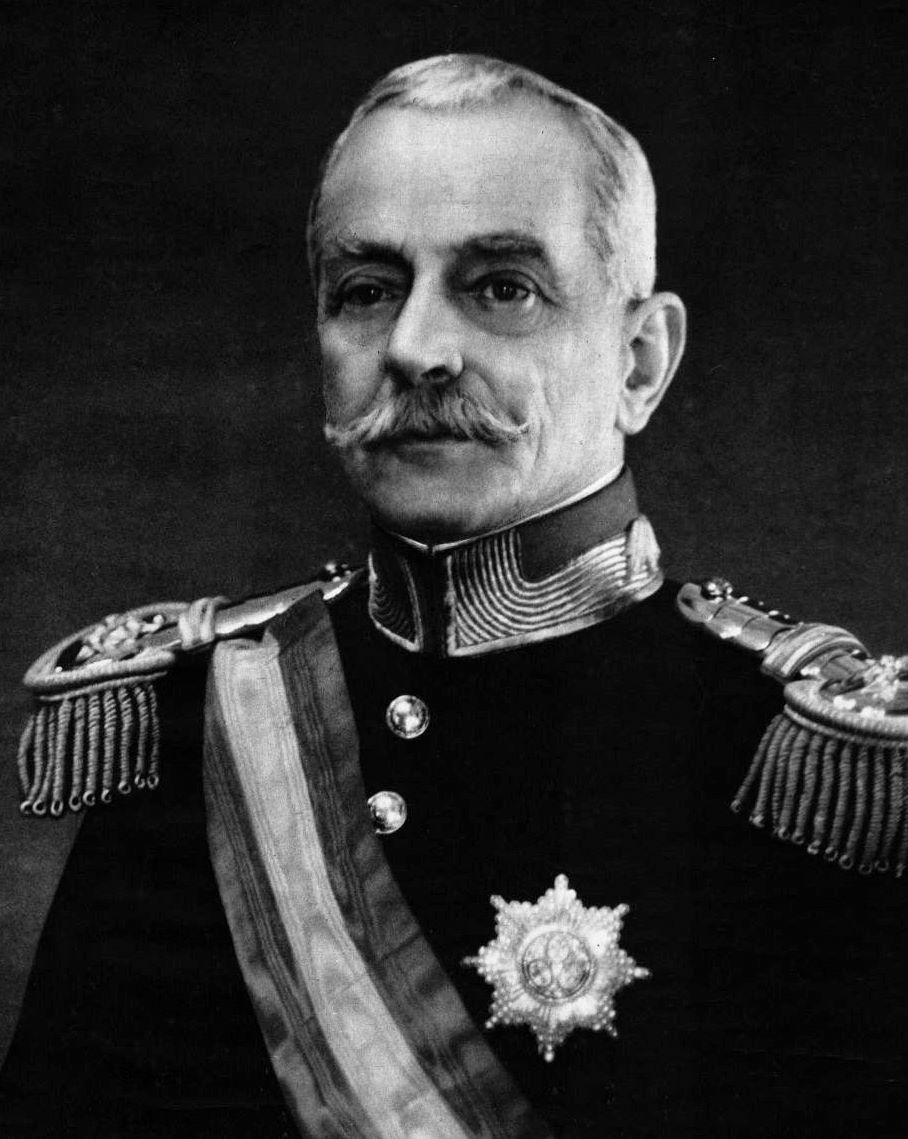
Oscar Carmona

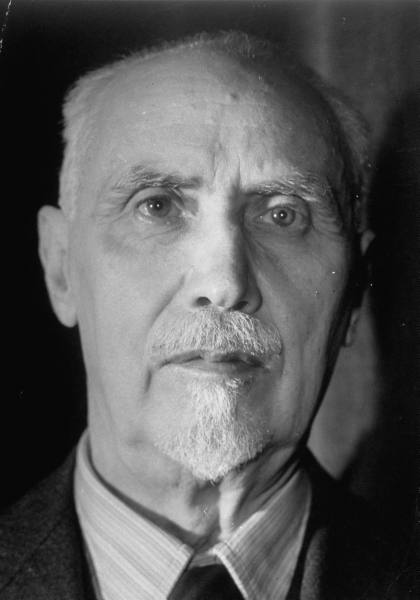
Ivanoe Bonomi

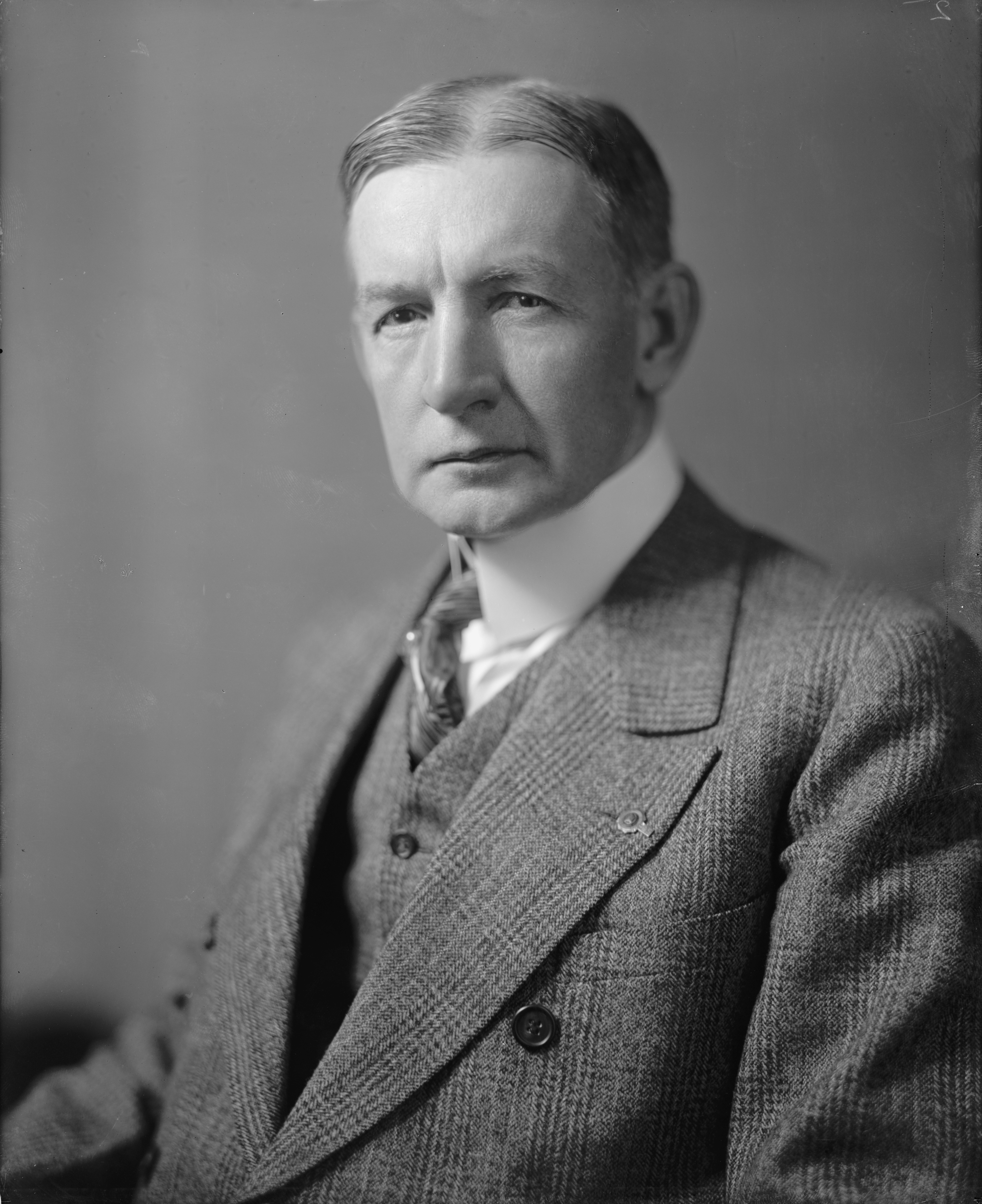
Charles G. Dawes

- April 2 – Mikhail Vladimirsky, Soviet politician (b. 1874)
- April 4 – George Albert Smith, 8th President of The Church of Jesus Christ of Latter-day Saints (b. 1870)
- April 5 – Cường Để, Vietnamese revolutionary leader (b. 1882)
- April 6 – Robert Broom, British paleontologist (b. 1866)
- April 9 – Vilhelm Bjerknes, Norwegian physicist and meteorologist (b. 1862)
- April 11
  - Peter Enzenauer, Canadian politician (b. 1878)
  - Joe King, American actor (b. 1883)
- April 14
  - Ernest Bevin, British labour leader, politician and statesman (b. 1881)
  - Al Christie, Canadian film director and producer (b. 1881)
- April 16 – Adolph Bolm, Russian-American dancer and choreographer (b. 1881)
- April 18 – Óscar Carmona, 96th Prime Minister of Portugal and 11th President of Portugal (b. 1869)
- April 19 – Frank Hopkins, American professional horseman, soldier (b. 1865)
- April 20 – Ivanoe Bonomi, Italian politician and statesman, 25th Prime Minister of Italy (b. 1873)
- April 21 – Lambertus Johannes Toxopeus, Dutch lepidopterist (b. 1894)
- April 22 – Horace Donisthorpe, British myrmecologist (b. 1870)
- April 23 – Charles G. Dawes, 30th Vice President of the United States, recipient of the Nobel Peace Prize (b. 1865)
- April 25 – Shyam, Hindi actor (b. 1920)
- April 26 – Arnold Sommerfeld, German physicist (b. 1868)
- April 29 – Ludwig Wittgenstein, Austrian philosopher (b. 1889)

=== May ===
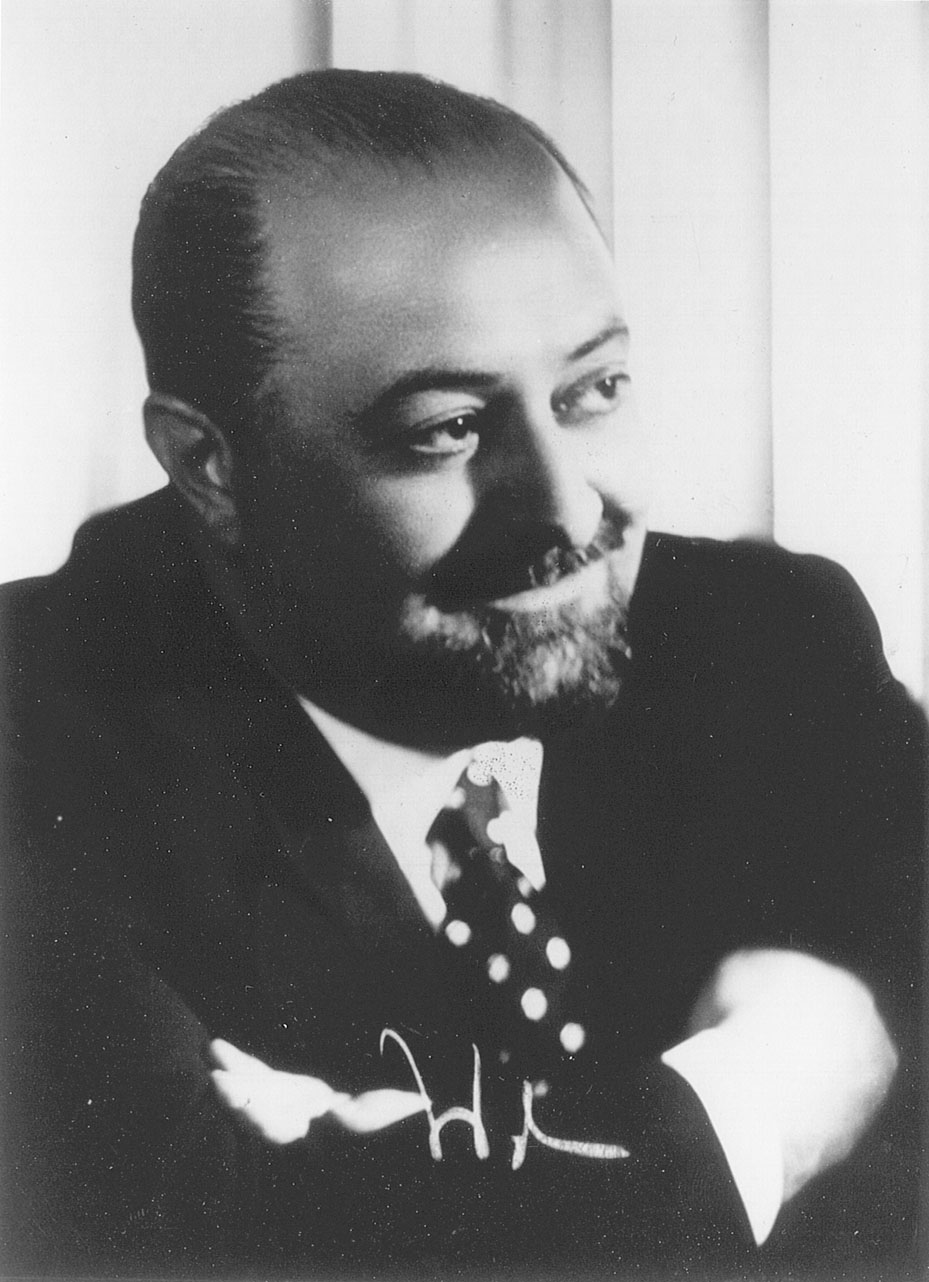
Homero Manzi

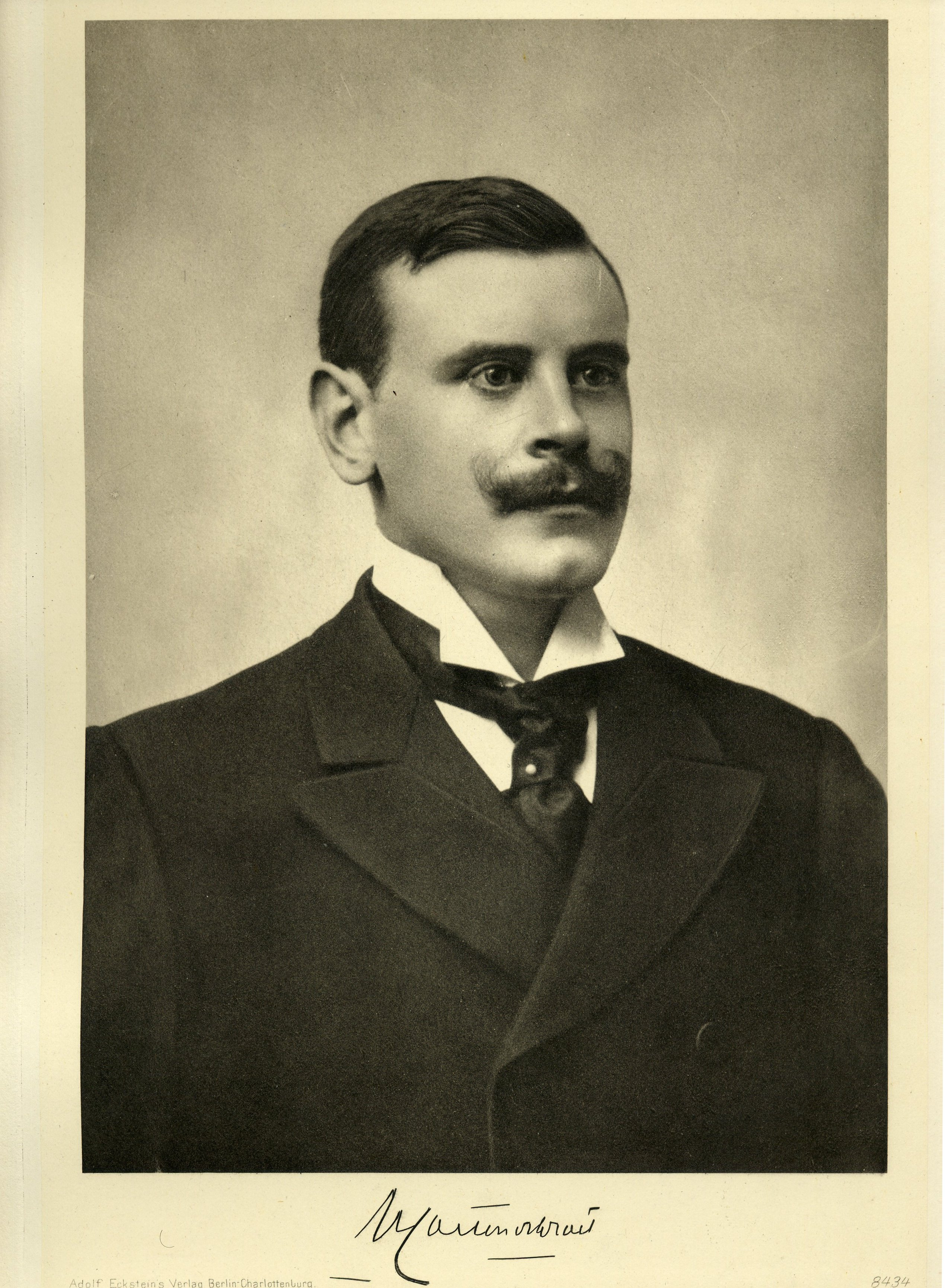
Henri Carton de Wiart

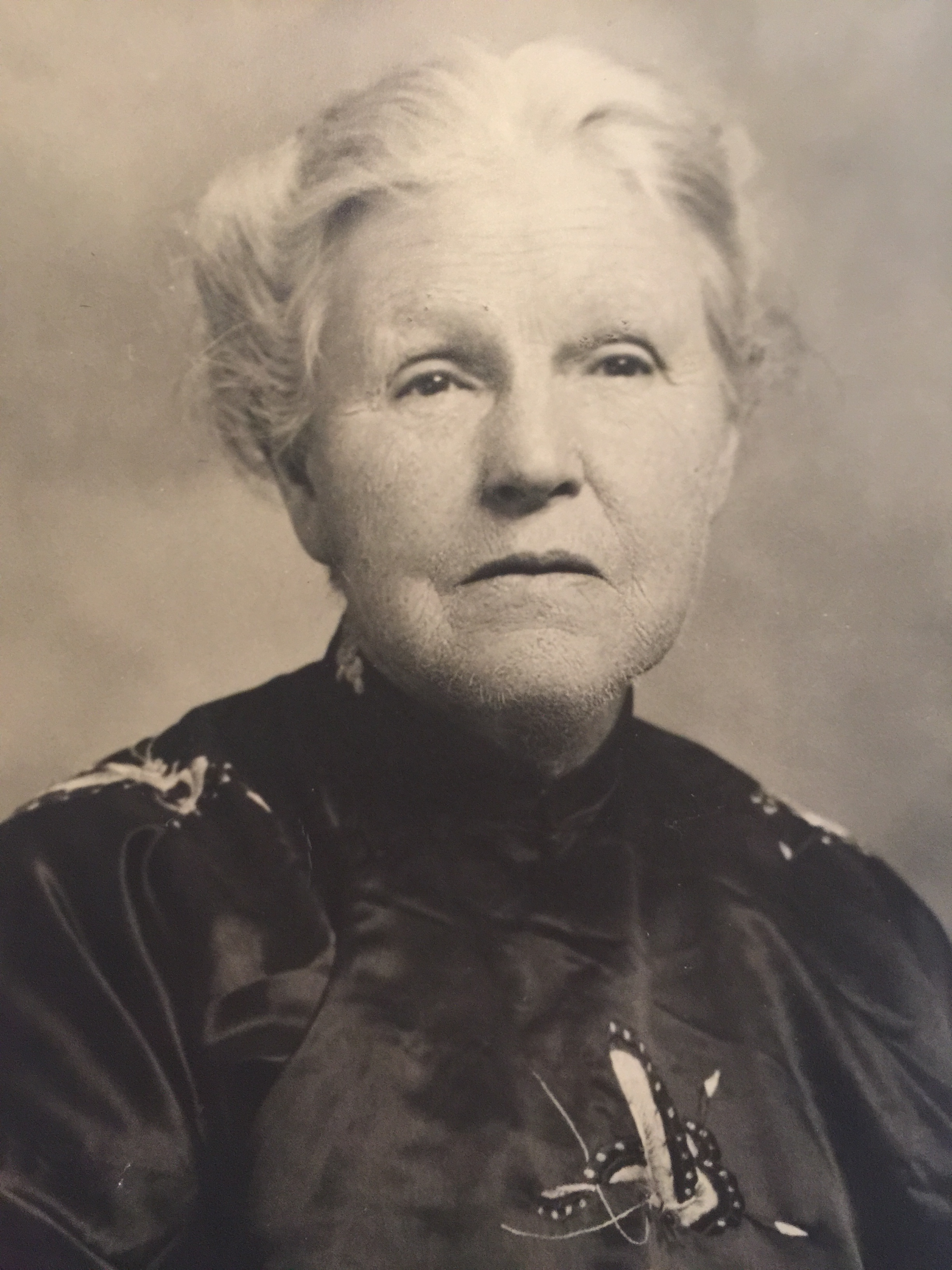
Mary Emelia Moore

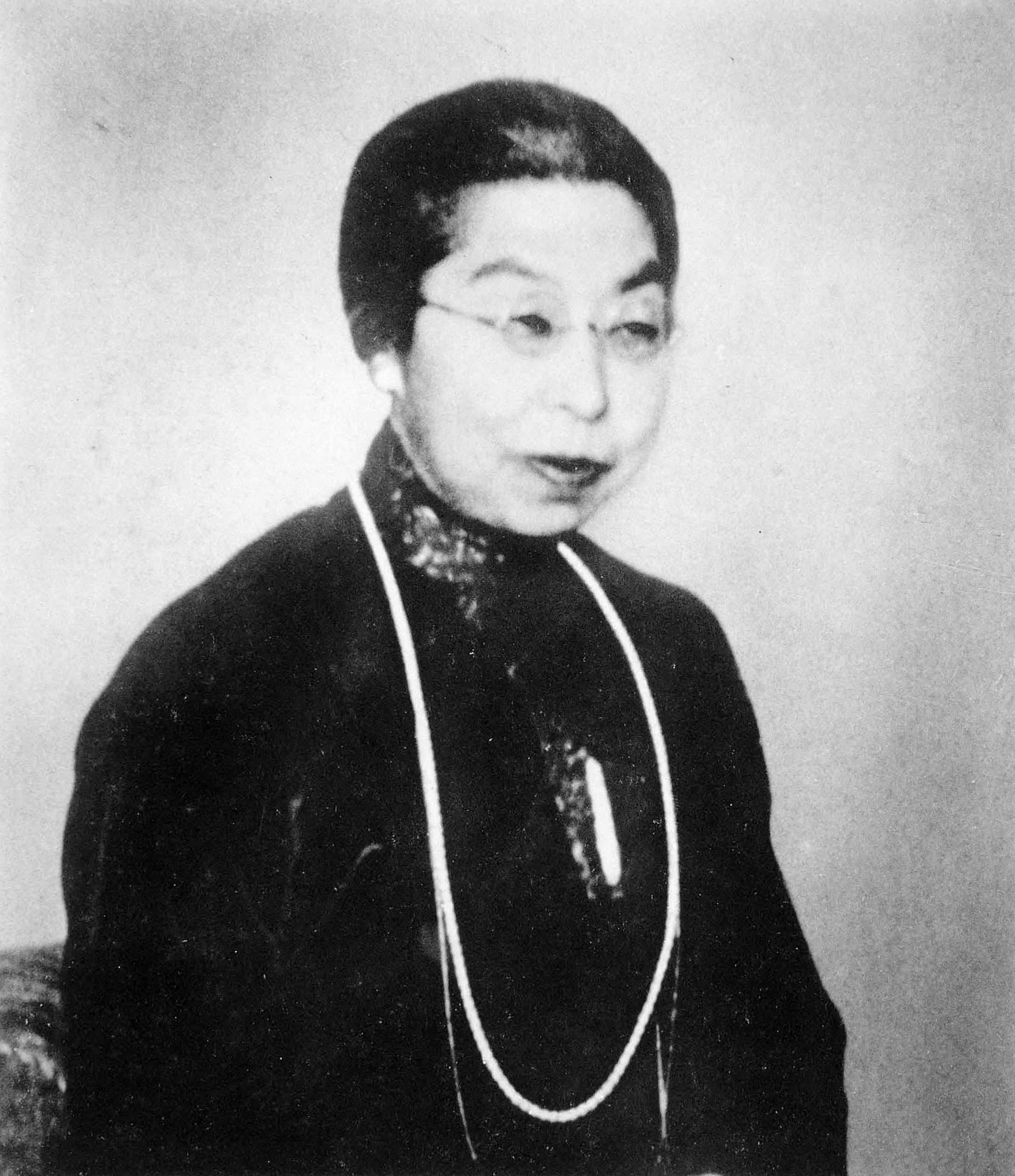
Empress Teimei

- May 1 – Klymentiy Sheptytsky, Soviet Orthodox priest, martyr and blessed (b. 1869)
- May 2
  - Alphonse de Châteaubriant, French writer (b. 1877)
  - Mansour bin Abdulaziz Al Saud, Saudi politician (b. 1921)
- May 3 – Homero Manzi, Argentine Tango lyricist and author (b. 1907)
- May 5
  - Eddie Dunn, American actor (b. 1896)
  - John Flynn, Australian medical services pioneer (b. 1880)
  - Andronicus Rudenko, Greek Orthodox priest and blessed (b. 1874)
- May 6 – Henri Carton de Wiart, 23rd Prime Minister of Belgium (b. 1869)
- May 7 – Warner Baxter, American actor (b. 1889)
- May 8 – Pat Hartigan, American actor and director (b. 1881)
- May 10 – Nikola Mushanov, 23rd Prime Minister of Bulgaria (b. 1872)
- May 16 – François Hussenot, French engineer (b. 1912)
- May 17
  - William Birdwood, 1st Baron Birdwood, British field marshal (b. 1865)
  - Mary Emelia Moore, New Zealand Presbyterian missionary in China (b. 1869)
  - Empress Teimei of Japan, Empress consort of Emperor Taishō (b. 1884)
- May 18 – Gaspar Agüero Barreras, Cuban composer, pianist and composer (b. 1873)
- May 20 – Marguerite Merington, English-American author (b. 1857)
- May 23 – Antonio Gandusio, Italian actor (b. 1875)
- May 25
  - Franz Klebusch, German actor (b. 1887)
  - Paula von Preradović, Austrian poet and writer (b. 1887)
- May 27 – Sir Thomas Blamey, Australian field marshal (b. 1884)
- May 29
  - Fanny Brice, American entertainer (b. 1891)
  - Antonio Mosca, Italian painter (b. 1870)
- May 30
  - Hermann Broch, Austrian author (b. 1886)
  - Sir Reginald Tyrwhitt, British admiral (b. 1870)

=== June ===
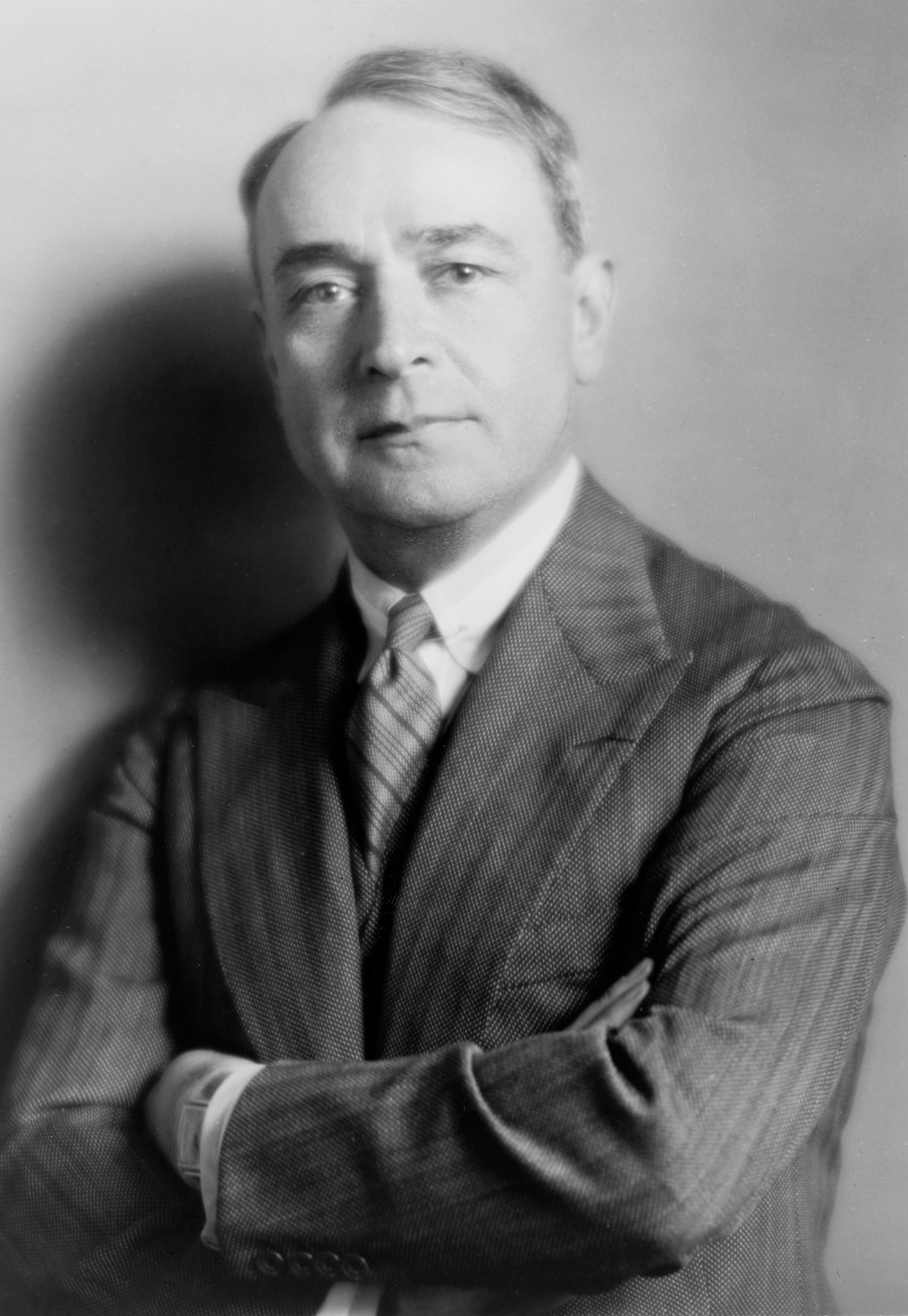
Serge Koussevitzky

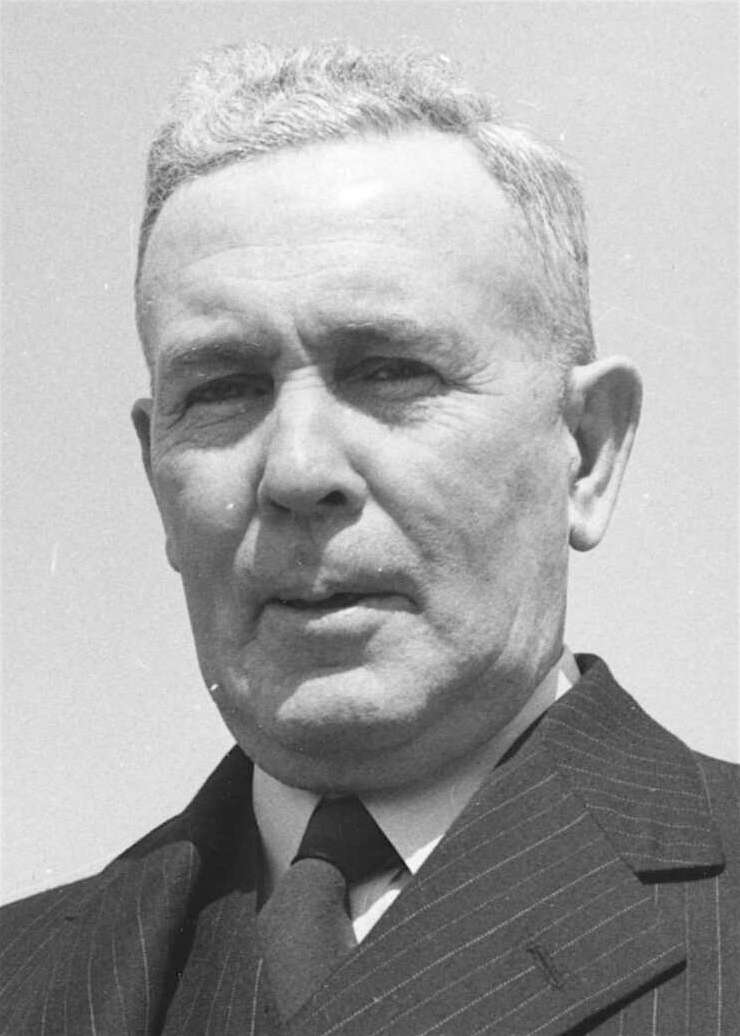
Ben Chifley

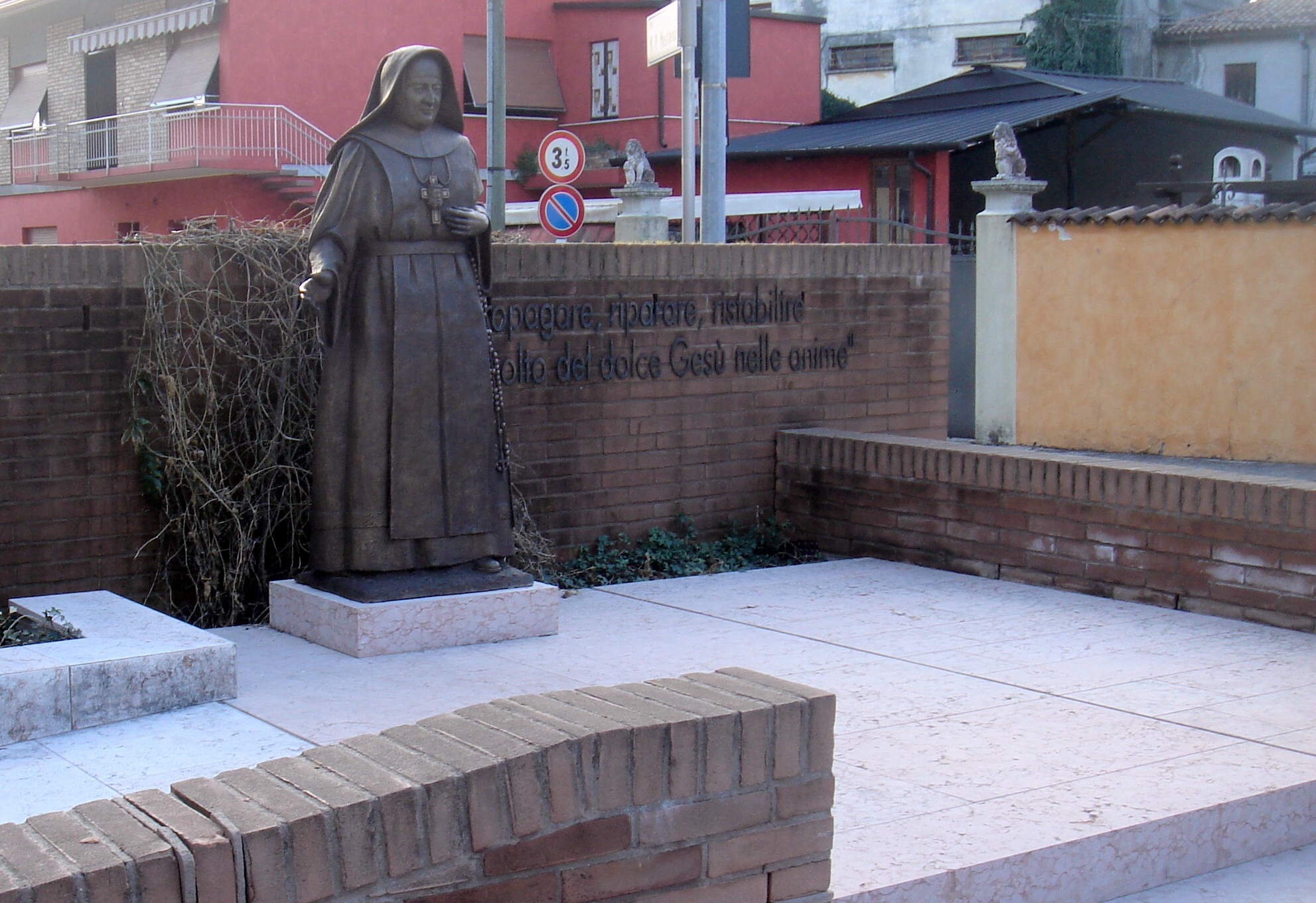
Blessed Maria Pia Mastena

- June 1
  - José Alejandrino, Filipino general (b. 1870)
  - Rafael Altamira y Crevea, Spanish historian and jurist (b. 1866)
  - Ludvig Oskar, Estonian painter (b. 1874)
- June 4 – Serge Koussevitzky, Russian-born conductor (b. 1874)
- June 7
  - Paul Blobel, German SS officer (executed) (b. 1894)
  - Werner Braune, German SS officer (executed) (b. 1909)
  - Erich Naumann, German SS officer (executed) (b. 1905)
  - Otto Ohlendorf, German SS officer (executed) (b. 1907)
  - Oswald Pohl, German SS officer (executed) (b. 1892)
- June 9 – Mayo Methot, American actress (b. 1904)
- June 13 – Ben Chifley, Australian politician, 16th Prime Minister of Australia (b. 1885)
- June 16
  - Pyotr Pavlenko, Soviet writer and screenwriter (b. 1899)
  - Thomas Alan Goldsborough, American politician, member of the US House of Representatives from 1921 to 1939 and a United States district judge from 1939 to 1951 (b. 1877)
- June 21
  - Charles Dillon Perrine, American astronomer, discovered two moons of Jupiter (Himalia and Elara) (b. 1867)
  - Ville Kiviniemi, Finnish politician (b. 1877)
- June 25 – Ferdinand Budicki, Croatian pioneer (b. 1871)
- June 27 – David Warfield, American stage actor (b. 1866)
- June 28 – Maria Pia Mastena, Italian Roman Catholic religious sister and blessed (b. 1881)
- June 29 – Juan Rivero Torres, Bolivian engineer and statesman (b. 1897)

=== July ===
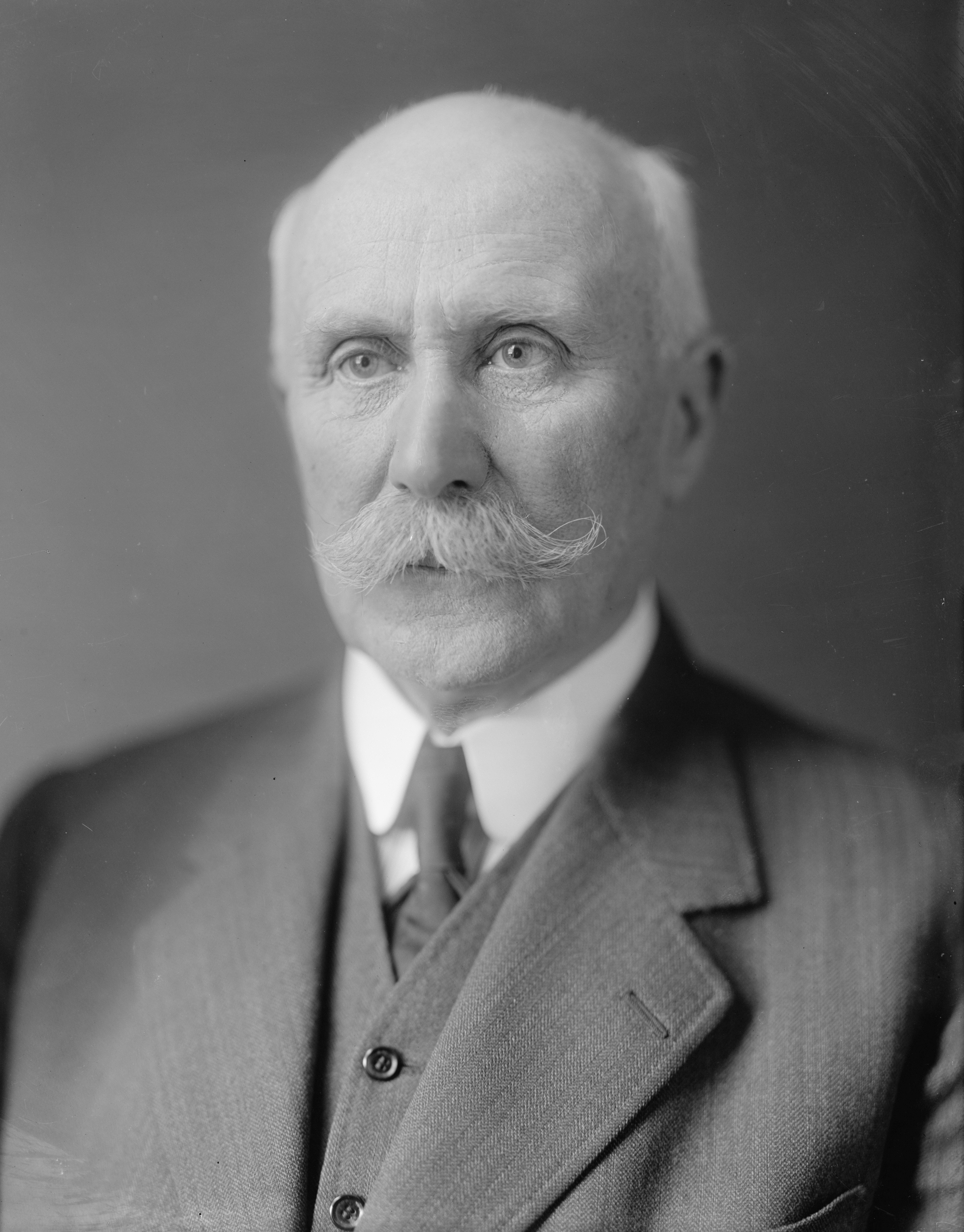
Philippe Pétain

- July 2 – Ferdinand Sauerbruch, German surgeon (b. 1875)
- July 3 – Tadeusz Borowski, Polish writer and journalist (b. 1922)
- July 9
  - Harry Heilmann, American baseball player (Detroit Tigers) and a member of the MLB Hall of Fame (b. 1894)
  - Egbert Van Alstyne, American songwriter and pianist (b. 1878)
- July 13 – Arnold Schoenberg, Austrian composer (b. 1874)
- July 15
  - Florentino Collantes, Filipino poet (b. 1896)
  - Celadet Alî Bedirxan, Kurdish politician, linguist and writer (b. 1893)
- July 17
  - Charles Desplanques, French anarchist and journalist (b. 1877)
  - Riad Al Solh, 2-Time Prime Minister of Lebanon (b. 1894)
- July 18
  - Ludovico di Caporiacco, Italian arachnologist (b. 1901)
  - Antti Juutilainen, Finnish farmer and politician (b. 1882)
- July 20
  - King Abdullah I of Jordan (assassinated) (b. 1882)
  - Elías Ahúja y Andría, Spanish philanthropist, politician, businessman and academic (b. 1863)
  - Crown Prince Wilhelm of Prussia (b. 1882)
- July 23
  - Robert J. Flaherty, American filmmaker (b. 1884)
  - Philippe Pétain, French World War I marshal, leader of Vichy France, 78th Prime Minister of France (b. 1856)
- July 25 – Henrik Ramsay, Finnish politician and economist (b. 1886)
- July 26 – Juozas Gabrys, Lithuanian politician and diplomat (b. 1880)
- July 30 – Sir Max Horton, British admiral (b. 1883)
- July 31 – Cho Ki-chon, Korean poet (b. 1913)

=== August ===
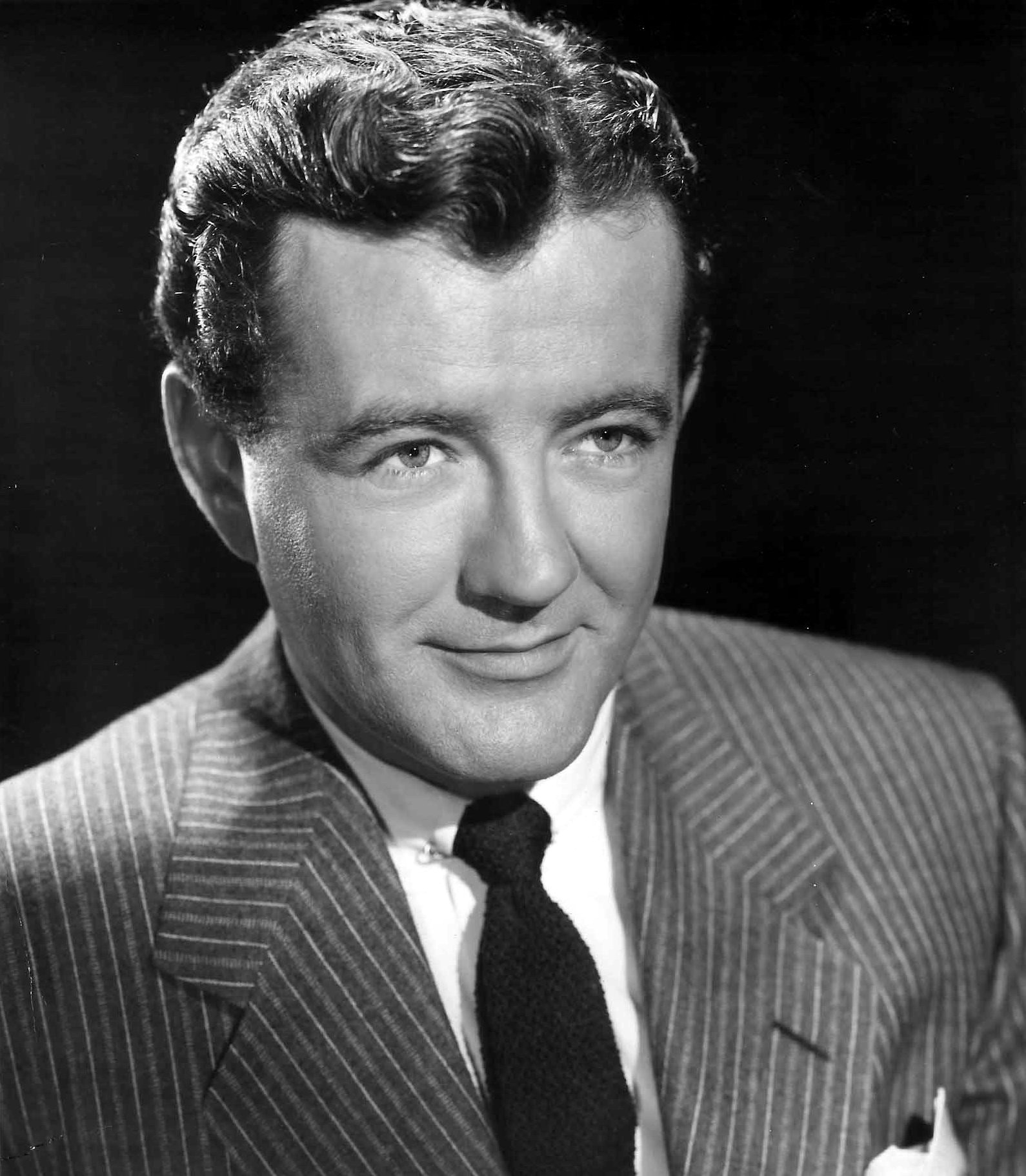
Robert Walker

- August 14 – William Randolph Hearst, American newspaper publisher (b. 1863)
- August 15 – Artur Schnabel, Austrian-born Jewish classical pianist (b. 1882)
- August 16 – Louis Jouvet, French actor and director (b. 1887)
- August 19 – Władysław Wróblewski, Polish politician, scientist, diplomat and lawyer, provisional Prime Minister of Poland (b. 1875)
- August 21 – Constant Lambert, British composer (b. 1905)
- August 24
  - Henri Rivière, French painter (b. 1864)
  - Antonio Sánchez de Bustamante y Sirven, Cuban lawyer (b. 1865)
- August 26 – Bill Barilko, Canadian hockey player (b. 1927)
- August 28 – Robert Walker, American actor (b. 1918)

=== September ===
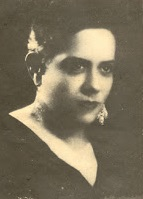
Ernestina Lecuona y Casado

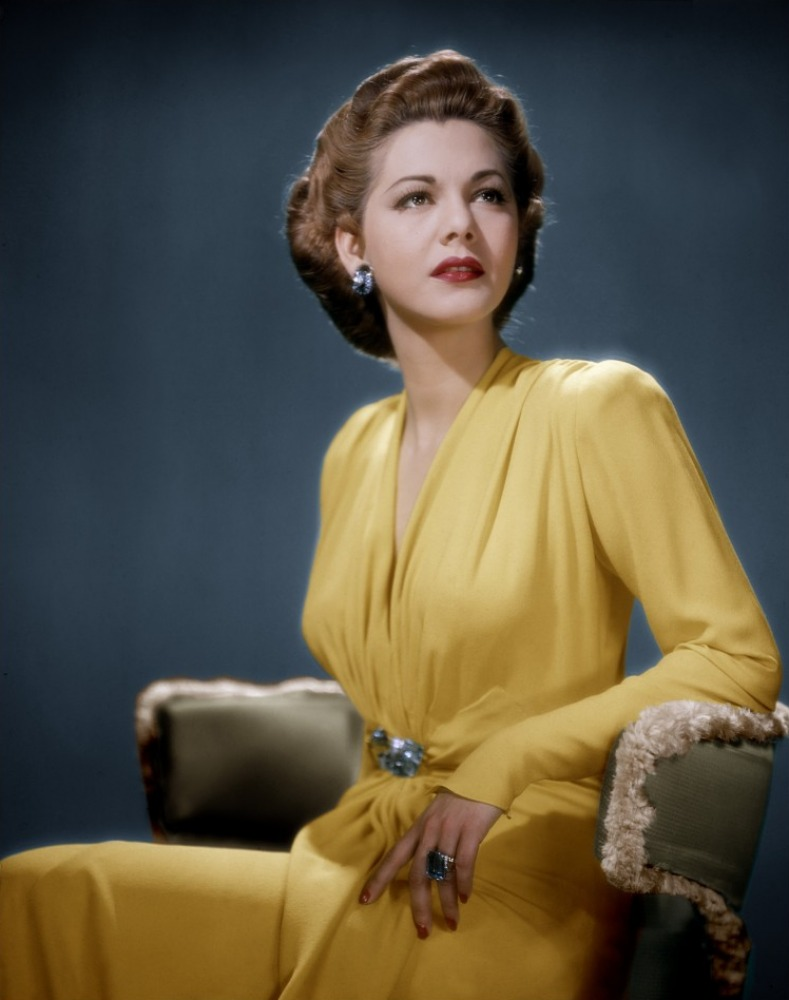
Maria Montez

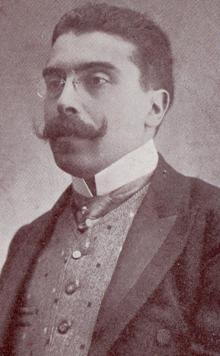
Augusto de Vasconcelos

- September 1
  - Louis Lavelle, French philosopher (b. 1883)
  - Wols, German painter and photographer (b. 1913)
- September 2 – Antoine Bibesco, Romanian aristocrat, lawyer, diplomat and writer (b. 1878)
- September 3
  - Ernestina Lecuona y Casado, Cuban pianist, musician, educator and composer (b. 1882)
  - Enrico Valtorta, Italian Roman Catholic bishop of Hong Kong and reverend (b. 1883)
  - Serge Voronoff, Russian-born French surgeon (b. 1866)
- September 5 – Mário Eloy, Portuguese painter (b. 1900)
- September 7
  - Maria Montez, Dominican actress (b. 1912)
  - John French Sloan, American artist (b. 1871)
- September 9
  - Anton Golopenția, Romanian sociologist (b. 1909)
  - Gibson Gowland, British actor (b. 1877)
- September 10 – Giuseppe Mulè, Italian composer and conductor (b. 1885)
- September 15 – Jacinto Guerrero, Spanish composer (b. 1895)
- September 17
  - František Nušl, Czechoslovak astronomer and mathematician (b. 1867)
  - Jimmy Yancey, American pianist and composer (b. 1898)
- September 18
  - Márton Rátkai, Hungarian actor (b. 1881)
  - Tomonaga Sanjūrō, Japanese philosopher (b. 1871)
- September 26 – Ioan Dimăncescu, Romania army officer (b. 1898)
- September 27 – Augusto de Vasconcelos, Portuguese surgeon, politician and diplomat, 57th Prime Minister of Portugal (b. 1867)
- September 29 – Thomas Cahill, American soccer coach (b. 1864)

=== October ===
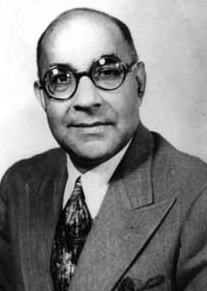
Liaquat Ali Khan

- October 4 – Henrietta Lacks, American originator of the HeLa cell line (b. 1920)
- October 6
  - Will Keith Kellogg, American industrialist, founder of the Kellogg Company (b. 1860)
  - Otto Fritz Meyerhof, German-born physician and biochemist (b. 1884)
- October 12 – Leon Errol, Australian-born actor and comedian (b. 1881)
- October 14 – Herman Charles Bosman, South African writer and journalist (b. 1905)
- October 16
  - Liaquat Ali Khan, 1st Prime Minister of Pakistan (assassinated) (b. 1895)
  - Saad Akbar Babrak, Afghan assassin (b. 1921 or 1922)
- October 17 – József Farkas, Hungarian nobleman, jurist and politician (b. 1857)
- October 23 – Fernando Poe Sr., Filipino actor (b. 1916)
- October 24
  - Al Baker, American magician (b. 1874)
  - Prince Carl, Duke of Västergötland (b. 1861)
  - Clarence Stewart Williams, American admiral (b. 1863)
- October 25 – Amélie of Orléans, Queen consort of Portugal (b. 1865)
- October 26
  - William S. Finucane, American businessman and politician (b. 1888)
  - Óscar Pérez Solís, Spanish artillery officer, engineer, jurist and politician (b. 1882)
- October 28 – Mady Christians, Austrian actress (b. 1892)
- October 29 – Nam Cao, Vietnamese short story write and novelist (b. 1915)
- October 30 – Gustav Smedal, Norwegian jurist (b. 1888)

=== November ===
- November 3
  - Aleksei Badayev, Soviet functionary (b. 1883)
  - Richard Wallace, American film director (b. 1894)
- November 4 – Khelifa Belkacem, Algerian chaabi singer (b. 1907)
- November 5
  - Agrippina Vaganova, Soviet ballerina (b. 1879)
  - Reggie Walker, South African Olympic athlete (b. 1889)
- November 9
  - Luigi Beltrame Quattrocchi, Italian Roman Catholic layman and blessed (b. 1880)
  - Sigmund Romberg, Hungarian-born American composer (b. 1887)
- November 13 – Nikolai Medtner, Soviet pianist and composer (b. 1880)
- November 14 – Ludovico Chigi Albani della Rovere, Prince and Grand Master of the Order of Malta (b. 1866)
- November 15 – Robert Elliott, American actor (b. 1879)
- November 20
  - Thomas Quinlan, British opera singer (b. 1881)
  - Lou Skuce, Canadian cartoonist (b. 1886)
- November 21
  - Jean Trescases, French Chief warrant officer, during the First Indochina War (b. 1916)
- November 23 – Enrichetta Alfieri, Italian Roman Catholic religious professed and blessed (b. 1891)
  - Ju Zheng, Chinese politician (b. 1876)
- November 25
  - István Friedrich, 24th Prime Minister of Hungary (b. 1883)
  - Harry B. Liversedge, American general (b. 1894)
- November 27 – Timrava, Slovak novelist (b. 1867)
- November 29 – Pramathesh Barua, Indian actor, director and screenwriter (b. 1903)

=== December ===
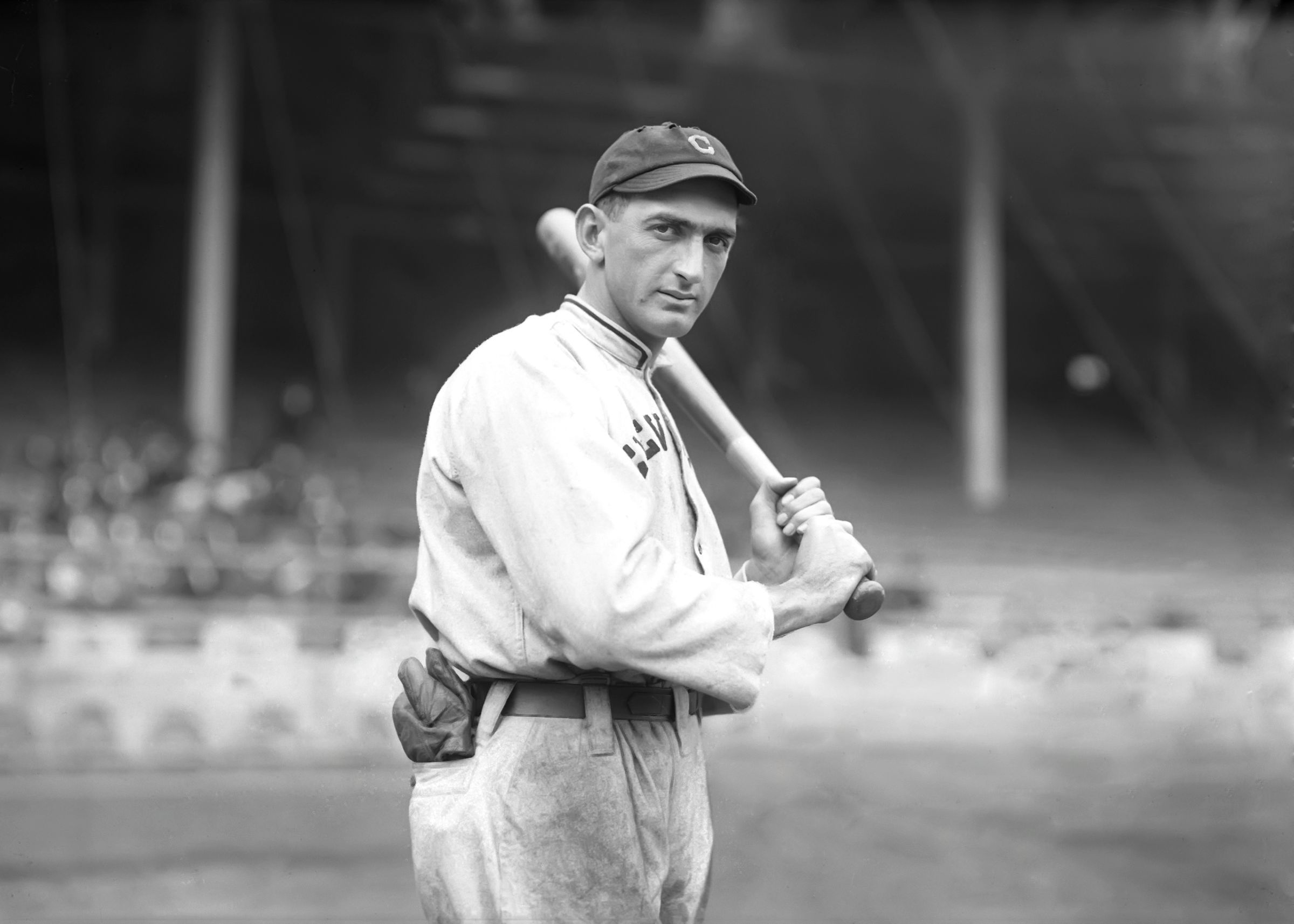
Shoeless Joe Jackson

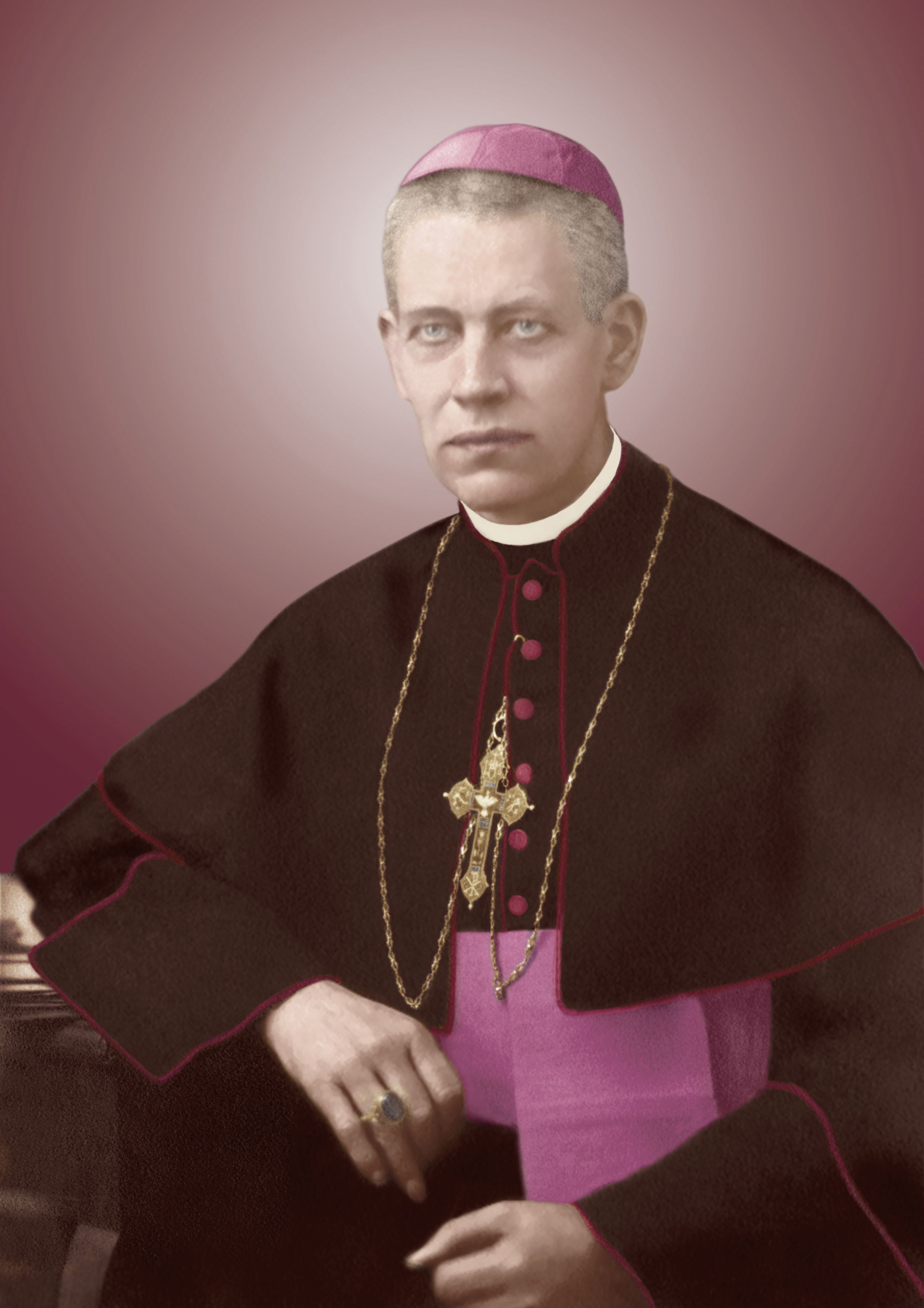
Blessed Anton Durcovici

- December 1 – Felix Petyrek, Austrian composer (b. 1892)
- December 4 – Pedro Salinas, Spanish poet (b. 1891)
- December 5 – Shoeless Joe Jackson, American baseball player (Chicago White Sox) (b. 1887)
- December 6
  - J. Edward Bromberg, Hungarian-born American character actor (b. 1903)
  - André Gobert, French tennis player (b. 1890)
  - Harold Ross, American editor (b.1892)
- December 10 – Algernon Blackwood, British writer (b. 1869)
- December 11
  - Christopher Addison, 1st Viscount Addison, British politician and physician (b. 1869)
  - Selim Palmgren, Finnish composer, pianist and conductor (b. 1878)
- December 12
  - Mildred Bailey, American singer (b. 1907)
  - Bill Patton, American actor (b. 1894)
- December 15 – Eric Drummond, 7th Earl of Perth, British diplomat, 1st Secretary-General of the League of Nations (b. 1876)
- December 19
  - Barton Yarborough, American actor (b. 1900)
  - Umberto Cassuto, Italian rabbi and biblical scholar (b. 1883)
- December 20 – Anton Durcovici, Austro-Hungarian born Romanian Roman Catholic bishop and blessed (b. 1888)
- December 23 – Enrique Santos Discépolo, Argentine tango and milonga musician and composer (b. 1901)
- December 24 – Raffaele Rossetti, Italian engineer and military naval officer (b. 1881)
- December 31 – Maxim Litvinov, Russian revolutionary and Soviet diplomat (b. 1876)

=== Date unknown ===
- Ștefan Burileanu, Romanian general, engineer, inventor, and academic (b. 1874)

== Nobel Prizes ==

- Physics – John Cockcroft and Ernest Walton
- Chemistry – Edwin McMillan and Glenn T. Seaborg
- Physiology or Medicine – Max Theiler
- Literature – Pär Lagerkvist
- Peace – Léon Jouhaux
