= List of Igbo people =

List of notable Igbo people of Nigeria

The list of Igbo people includes notable individuals who have full or significant ancestry traced back to the Igbo people of South-East and South-South geopolitical regions of Nigeria.

This page also contains names of people who traced their African heritage through DNA testing to the Igbo ethnic group.

== Beauty pageant winners and models ==
=== Miss Nigeria & Most Beautiful Girl in Nigeria ===
- Unoaku Anyadike, Most Beautiful Girl in Nigeria 2015, Miss World 2015 Nigeria representative
- Iheoma Nnadi, Most Beautiful Girl in Nigeria 2014, Miss World 2014 Nigeria representative
- Ezinne Akudo, Miss Nigeria 2013
- Sylvia Nduka, Most Beautiful Girl in Nigeria 2011, Miss World 2011 Nigeria representative
- Fiona Amuzie-Iredu, Most Beautiful Girl in Nigeria 2010, Miss World 2010 Nigeria representative
- Glory Umunna, Most Beautiful Girl in Nigeria 2009, Miss World 2009 Nigeria representative
- Adaeze Igwe, Most Beautiful Girl in Nigeria 2008, Miss World 2008 Nigeria representative, wife of former Nigerian football team captain Joseph Yobo
- Munachi Nwankwo, Most Beautiful Girl in Nigeria 2007, Miss World 2007 Nigeria representative
- Chinenye Ochuba, Most Beautiful Girl in Nigeria 2002, Miss World 2002 Top 10 finalist, African Continental Queen of Beauty
- Sabina Umeh, Most Beautiful Girl in Nigeria 1990
- Bianca Odumegwu-Ojukwu, Most Beautiful Girl in Nigeria 1988, Miss Africa 1988, Miss Intercontinental 1989, Nigeria ambassador to Spain 2012–15, wife of the late Biafran President Odumegwu Ojukwu
- Lynda Chuba-Ikpeazu, Miss Africa 1987, 2nd Nigerian to represent Nigeria in Miss Universe 1987 after a 23-year absence of the country in the pageant
- Chidimma Adetshina, Most Beautiful Girl in Nigeria 2007. She represented Nigeria at the Miss Universe 2024 pageant in Mexico and finished as the first runner-up. She was also crowned Miss Universe Africa and Oceania as the highest ranked African Contestant of 2024. Her placement is Nigeria's highest at any Miss Universe pageant.

=== Mister Nigeria ===
- Ikenna Bryan Okwara, Mr Nigeria 2007, semi-finalist Mister World 2007

=== Runway models and magazine covers ===
- Ngo Okafor, arguably the internet's most downloaded black male model.
- Oluchi Onweagba, winner of Face of Africa 1998; she has starred in shows for Gucci, Carolina Herrera, John Galliano, Missoni, Tommy Hilfiger, Chanel, Bottega Veneta, Christian Dior, Alessandro Dell'Acqua, Jeremy Scott, Helmut Lang, Fendi, Mary Timms, Anna Sui, Givenchy, Kenzo, Giorgio Armani, Céline, Nina Ricci, and Diane Von Furstenberg

=== More pageant winners ===
- Collete Nwadike, winner of the Exquisite Face of the Universe Pageant, winner of Miss Tourism Nigeria 2014, and special advisor to the Governor of Anambra State on tourism

== Music producers ==
- DJ Coublon, awarded Producer of the Year by All Africa Music Awards (AFRIMA)
- Masterkraft, won Music Producer of the Year at both the City People Entertainment Awards and Nigeria Entertainment Awards.
- Tyler, the Creator, Grammy award-winning artist
- Rexxie, Nigerian record producer and DJ

== Actors and actresses ==
=== Foreign ===
- Annie Ilonzeh, starred in General Hospital, Charlie's Angels, Arrow, Drop Dead Diva, Empire, All Eyez on Me, 'Til Death Do Us Part, Percy Jackson & the Olympians: The Lightning Thief
- Antonia Okonma, starred as Darlene Cake in the ITV series Bad Girls
- Ashley Madekwe, film credits include Bambi in the ITV2 series Secret Diary of a Call Girl, Ashley Davenport on the ABC drama series Revenge and the witch Tituba in the WGN America series Salem
- Carmen Ejogo, hosted the Saturday Disney morning show. Film credits include Love's Labour's Lost (2000), What's the Worst That Could Happen? (2001), Away We Go (2009), Sparkle (2012), Alex Cross (2012), The Purge: Anarchy (2014), It Comes at Night (2017), Alien: Covenant (2017). She Picquery in the Fantastic Beasts film series, Coretta Scott King in two films: Boycott (2001) and Selma (2014)
- Caroline Chikezie, Her movie roles include Sasha Williams in As If, Elaine Hardy in Footballers' Wives, Queen Tamlin in The Shannara Chronicles, the Cyberwoman in Torchwood, Nasuada in Eragon
- Charles Venn, known for his roles as Ray Dixon in EastEnders, Jacob Masters in Casualty, Curtis Alexander in Dream Team, Tremaine Gidigbi in Footballers' Wives
- Chike Nwoffiah, actor, theater director and filmmaker. Listed as one of the "Top Ten Most Influential African Americans" in the San Francisco Bay Area, he has served on several regional and national grant review panels including: the National Endowment for the Arts, Pennsylvania Council on the Arts, Sacramento Arts Commission, San Francisco Arts Commission, Arts Council Silicon Valley, Walter and Elise Haas Fund and the Center for Cultural Innovation
- Chiké Okonkwo, starred as PC Clark in New Tricks and DC Callum Gada in Paradox. He currently stars as Lee Truitt, the love interest of the title character on the BET series Being Mary Jane
- Chiwetel Ejiofor, Award-winning and two-time Golden Globe Award-nominated actor, Brother of CNN newscaster Zain Asher
- Cyril Nri, actor, writer and director who starred as Superintendent "Adam Okaro" in the police TV series The Bill
- Enuka Okuma, starred in Rookie Blue, Madison, Sue Thomas: F.B.Eye, Hillside
- Ifeanyi Chijindu
- Megalyn Echikunwoke, starred as Tara Price in CSI: Miami, Isabelle Tyler in The 4400 and as Mari McCabe / Vixen in the Arrowverse. Partner of comedian and actor Chris Rock
- Nonso Anozie, starred as Tank in RocknRolla, Sergeant Dap in Ender's Game, Abraham Kenyatta in Zoo, Captain of the Guards in Cinderella and Xaro Xhoan Daxos in the HBO television series Game of Thrones
- Phina Oruche, actress, radio presenter and former model who starred as Liberty Baker in ITV's Footballers' Wives, for which she won a Screen Nations Award for Favourite TV Star
- Tracy Ifeachor, known for roles in Blooded, Billionaire Ransom, Casualty, Doctor Who, Strike Back, Jo, Crossbones, Hawaii Five-0, Ina Paha, The Originals, Quantico
- Uzo Aduba, starred as Suzanne "Crazy Eyes" Warren on the Netflix original series Orange Is the New Black, winner of an Emmy Award for Outstanding Guest Actress in a Comedy Series in 2014, an Emmy Award for Outstanding Supporting Actress in a Drama Series in 2015, and two Screen Actors Guild Awards for Outstanding Performance by a Female Actor in a Comedy Series in 2014 and 2015. She is one of only two actors to win an Emmy Award in both the comedy and drama categories for the same role.
- Kelechi Eke is the founder of The African Film Festival (TAFF) and the creator of movie streaming service, Rootflix. On 19 August 2023, he received the United States President Lifetime Achievement Award for his humanitarian services.

=== Traced heritage ===
- Blair Underwood, American television and film actor nominated for a 2009 Golden Globe Award for his role on In Treatment
- Danny Glover
- Forest Whitaker, American actor, producer, and director who won an Academy Award for his performance as Ugandan dictator Idi Amin in the 2006 film The Last King of Scotland'
- Paul Robeson (1898–1976), multi-lingual American actor, athlete, Basso cantante concert singer, writer, civil rights activist, fellow traveler, Spingarn Medal winner, and Stalin Peace Prize laureate

=== Nollywood ===
- Afro Candy
- Amaechi Muonagor, actor and producer. Igodo, Without Goodbye, Most Wanted Kidnappers, Jack and Jill, Village Rascal, Evil World, Ugonma, Spirits
- Bob-Manuel Udokwu, Lifetime Achievement award winner at the 10th Africa Movie Academy Awards
- Chacha Eke, starred in The End is Near, Commander in Chief, Clap of Thunder, Two Hearts
- Chelsea Eze
- Chidi Mokeme, actor and ex host of the Gulder Ultimate Search Reality-show
- Chika Ike, winner of the Actors Guild of Nigeria (AGN) Award for Most Disciplined Actress
- Chinedu "Aki" Ikedieze, He is best known for his character "Aki", playing alongside Osita Iheme in their breakthrough movie Aki na Ukwa, recipient of the Lifetime Achievement Award at the Africa Movie Academy Awards.
- Chioma Chukwuka, actress and movie producer, winner of the Africa Movie Academy Award for Best Actress in a leading role, winner of the Afro Hollywood award for Best actress in a lead role
- Cynthia Shalom, actress and producer, winner of Next Movie Star reality show season 11
- Chioma Okoye
- Chioma Toplis
- Chizzy Alichi, winner City People Entertainment Awards Best New Actress Of The Year (English), winner Nigeria Achievers Award Next Rated Actress Of The Year
- Clem Ohameze, starred in Ije: The Journey
- Destiny Etiko
- Ebele Okaro, Best Supporting Actress 2017 Africa Magic Viewers Choice Awards
- Ebube Nwagbo, starred in Arrested by Love, Eyes of the Nun, Before My Eyes, Against My Blood, Royal Palace, Not Yours!, Ojuju calabar
- Ejike Asiegbu, former President of the Actors Guild of Nigeria.
- Emeka Ike
- Enyinna Nwigwe, best known for The Wedding Party, Black November, Black Gold
- Francis Agu (1965–2007), actor. Best known for his role on the long-running Nigerian television series Checkmate
- Frederick Leonard
- Genevieve Nnaji, winner Africa Movie Academy Award for Best Actress in a Leading Role, Africa Magic Viewers Choice Awards for Best Movie West Africa, Nigeria Entertainment Awards for Best Actress Tv Series and Best Actress in Supporting Role, Nollywood Movies Awards for Viewers Choice- Female, Ghana Movie Awards for Best Actress-Africa Collaboration, NAFCA for Best Actress Leading Role, Best of Nollywood Awards for Best Kiss, Zulu African Film Academy Awards for Best Actress, City People Entertainment Awards for Best Actress. Member of the Order of the Federal Republic
- Hanks Anuku, often stars as a villain in many Nollywood films. Brother of Miss Nigeria 1986 Late Rita Anuku
- Ijeoma Grace Agu
- Jim Iyke, one of the stars of the movie Last Flight to Abuja
- John Okafor, acted in more than 200 movies including Mr.Ibu (2004), Mr.Ibu in London (2004), Police Recruit (2003), 9 Wives (2005), Ibu in Prison (2006) and Keziah (2007).
- Kanayo O. Kanayo
- Ken Erics
- Linda Ejiofor
- Lota Chukwu
- Mercy Johnson
- Michael Ezuruonye
- Mike Godson
- Monalisa Chinda
- Muna Obiekwe
- Ngozi Ezeonu
- Nuella Njubigbo
- Nkem Owoh
- Nonso Diobi
- Oby Kechere
- OC Ukeje
- Oge Okoye
- Onyeka Onwenu
- Osita "Paw paw" Iheme
- Patience Ozokwor
- Pete Edochie
- Prince Eke
- Queen Nwokoye
- Rachael Okonkwo
- Regina Daniels
- Rita Dominic
- Saint Obi
- Stella Damasus-Aboderin
- Stephanie Okereke, Best Actress – English and Best Actress of the year 2003, Reel Awards 2003 – also nominated twice for the Africa Movie Academy Award 2005 and 2009 for Best Actress in a Leading Role
- Sylvia Oluchy
- Tonto Dike
- Tony Umez
- Uche Jombo
- Uru Eke
- Yul Edochie
- Zack Orji
- Kelechi Eke

== Comedians ==
- Basketmouth
- Buchi
- Chigul
- Frank D Don
- Godfrey
- Mama Uka
- Emmanuella Samuel
- Mark Angel
- Nedu Wazobia
- Josh2Funny

== TV/Radio hosts and journalists ==
- Adaora Onyechere, co-anchor of morning show Kakaaki on AIT
- Ebuka Obi-Uchendu, Big Brother Naija and Rubbing minds host
- Emma Ugolee
- Ros Gold-Onwude
- Joyce Ohajah
- Keme Nzerem, Channel 4 News news anchor and reporter.
- Murphy Ijemba
- Ogechukwukanma Ogwo
- Tobechi Nneji, "Most listened-to OAP in all of Eastern Nigeria at mid-day" according to ThisDay newspaper
- Uti Nwachukwu
- Zain Asher, news anchor at CNN, sister of actor Chiwetel Ejiofor

== Artists and illustrators ==
- Ada Udechukwu
- Ben Enwonwu (1921–1994)
- Chike Aniakor
- Chris Ofili
- Dawn Okoro
- Demas Nwoko
- Chidi Kwubiri
- George Edozie
- Ifeanyi Chijindu
- Ken Nwadiogbu
- Mendi & Keith Obadike
- Ndidi Dike
- Nnenna Okore
- Obiora Udechukwu
- Tony Nsofor
- Uche Okeke
- Kelvin Okafor

== Authors ==
- Ada Udechukwu (born 1960)
- Adaobi Tricia Nwaubani
- Akwaeke Emezi (born 1987)
- Africanus Horton (1835–1883), also known as James Beale, he was a writer and folklorist from Sierra Leone
- Buchi Emecheta (1944–2017)
- Catherine Obianuju Acholonu (1951–2014)
- Chika Unigwe (born 1974)
- Chimamanda Ngozi Adichie (born 1977), best known for Half of a Yellow Sun
- Chinua Achebe (1930–2013), novelist, poet and critic, best known for his award-winning novel Things Fall Apart
- Chinweizu Ibekwe (born 1943)
- Chris Abani (born 1966), notable for his first novel, Masters of the Board, which was about a Neo-Nazi takeover of Nigeria
- Christopher Okigbo (1932–1967)
- Chukwuemeka Ike (1931–2020)
- Cyprian Ekwensi (1921–2007)
- E. Nolue Emenanjo (born 1943)
- Edward Wilmot Blyden (1832–1912), Liberian educator, clergyman and Pan-Africanist
- Elizabeth Isichei (born 1939), prominent historian
- Emma Ugolee (born 1975)
- F. Nnabuenyi Ugonna (1936–1990)
- Flora Nwapa (1931–1993)
- Ifeanyi Chijindu (born 1978)
- Ifeoma Onyefulu (born 1959)
- Iheoma Nwachukwu
- Ike Oguine
- Joy Chinwe Eyisi (born 1969), best known for her Common Errors in the Use of English
- Michael Echeruo (born 1937)
- Okey Ndibe (born 1960)
- Okwui Enwezor (1963–2019)
- Olaudah Equiano (c. 1745–1797), also known as Gustavus Vassa, was a writer and abolitionist
- Onuora Nzekwu (1928–2017)
- Onyeka Nwelue (born 1988)
- Nkem Nwankwo (1936–2001)
- Nnedi Okorafor (born 1974)
- Nnorom Azuonye (1967–2024)
- Paschal Eze
- Uche Nduka (born 1963)
- Uchechi Kalu
- Uzodinma Iweala (born 1982)
- Vincent Chukwuemeka Ike (1931–2020)
- William Napoleon Barleycorn (1884–1925), Spanish Guinean Primitive Methodist missionary and author of the first Bube language primer. He was a member of a prominent Fernandino family.
- Zulu Sofola (1935–1995), the first published female Nigerian playwright and dramatist and first female Professor of Theater Arts in Africa
- Nduka Otiono
- Emeka Nwabueze (born 23 September 1949)

== Film makers, producers and directors ==
- Amaka Igwe
- Chet Anekwe
- Chika Anadu
- Chinedum Iregbu
- Chineze Anyaene
- C. J. Obasi
- Chris Ihidero
- David Nnaji
- Dickson Iroegbu
- Eddie Ugbomah
- Ikechukwu Onyeka
- Izu Ojukwu
- Lonzo Nzekwe
- Mildred Okwo
- Obi Emelonye
- Ujuaku Akukwe
- Oby Kechere
- Okechukwu Oku
- Onyeka Nwelue
- Pascal Amanfo
- Pascal Atuma
- Sam Ukala
- Uche Odoh
- Mary Uranta
- Uzo
- Chijindu Kelechi Eke

== Singers and musicians ==
=== Gospel singers ===
- Ada Ehi
- Frank Edwards
- Mercy Chinwo
- Obiwon
- Patty Obasi
- Samsong
- Sinach

=== Pre-2000s ===
- Bright Chimezie
- Celestine Ukwu
- Chief Stephen Osita Osadebe
- Dr Alban
- Jide Obi
- Joshua Uzoigwe
- Mendi & Keith Obadike
- Mike Ejeagha
- Nelly Uchendu
- Oliver De Coque
- Onyeka Onwenu
- Oriental brothers
- Patti Boulaye
- Pericoma Okoye
- William Onyeabor

=== 2000s ===
- Amarachi
- Bracket
- Benjamin Okorie
- Blaqbonez
- Chidinma
- Chike
- Chikezie
- CKay
- Dax
- Duncan Mighty
- Dekumzy
- Echezonachukwu Nduka
- Ego Ihenacho
- Emeka Nwokedi
- Emma Nyra
- Emmy Gee
- Etcetera Ejikeme
- Faze
- Fave
- Flavour N'abania
- Humblesmith
- Illbliss
- J. Martins
- Jidenna
- Kcee
- Kele Okereke, vocalist and rhythm guitarist for English indie rock band Bloc Party
- Kingsley Okorie
- Lachi
- Lemar
- Leo the Lion
- Lynxxx
- Mr Raw
- Muma Gee
- Naeto C
- Nneka
- P-Square, R&B duo composed of identical twin brothers Peter and Paul Okoye
- Patoranking
- Phyno
- Ric Hassani
- Ruggedman
- Runtown
- Shaboozey
- SHiiKANE
- Snazzy the Optimist
- Tekno
- Tinie Tempah
- Ty
- Ugoccie
- Tyler, the Creator
- Waconzy
- 2Shotz
- Tobe Nwigwe
- Victony
- Yemi Alade

== Education ==
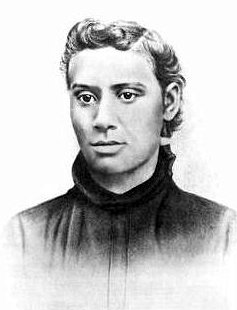
Maria Louisa Bustill

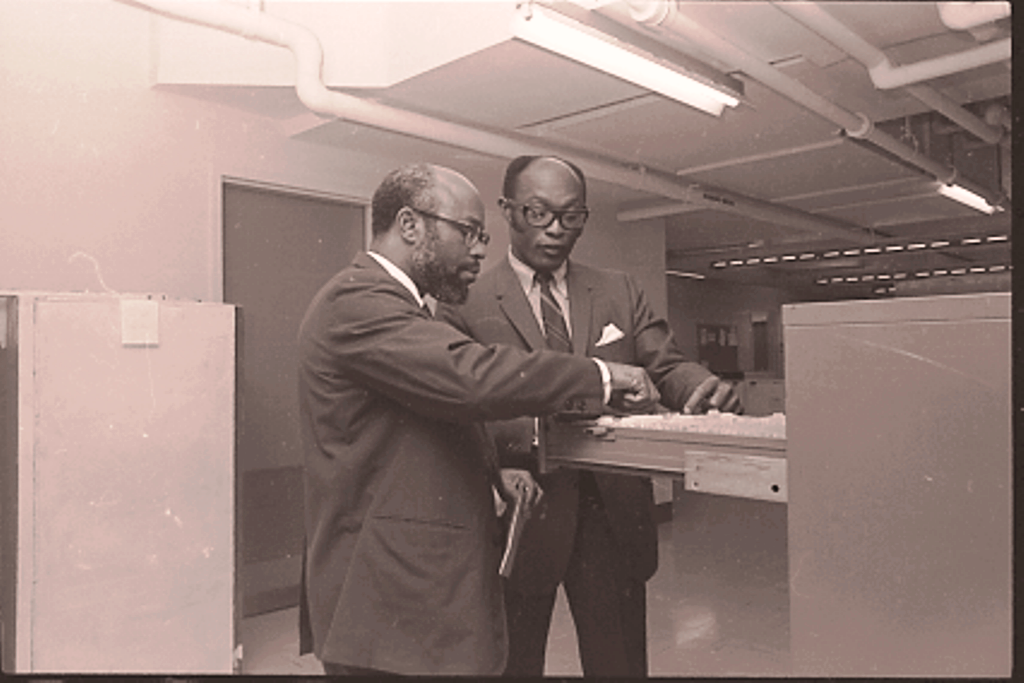
Botanist Dr. Eni Njoku and Dr. Edward Ayensu

P. N. Okeke-Ojiudu

Name	Born	Death	Notability
Maria Louisa Bustill	8 November 1853	20 January 1904	Quaker schoolteacher; the mother of Paul Robeson; and the wife of the Reverend William Drew Robeson
Michael Echeruo	14 March 1937	–	
Tessy Okoli	–	–	
E. Nolue Emenanjo	1943	–	
Uche Nduka	14 October 1963	–	
Eni Njoku	6 November 1917	22 December 1974	The first Nigerian Vice Chancellor
Onuora Nzekwu	19 February 1928	21 April 2017	
P. N. Okeke-Ojiudu	1914	1995	
Kenneth Dike	17 December 1917	26 October 1983	The pioneer Vice Chancellor of University of Lagos and University of Nigeria Nsukka
John Ogbu	9 May 1939	20 August 2003	
Ogwo E. Ogwo	7 June 1949	–	
Emeka Enejere	8 August 1944		The 14th Pro Chancellor of University of Nigeria, Nsukka
Zephrinus Chidubem Njoku	15 May 1959		
Emmanuel Chinwokwu	-		Professor of New Testament Studies at University of Nigeria, Nsukka
Patrick Obi Ngoddy			Nigerian professor of Food Engineering and Processing at the Faculty of Agriculture
Sonny Chidebelu			Professor of Agribusiness
Sophia Obiajulu Ogwude			Professor of English and Comparative studies
Florence Orabueze	30 March 1966	–	Professor of English and literary studies
Edith Nwosu	22 March 1962	–	Professor of Corporate Law
Basil Ezeanolue	17 November 1953	–	Professor of Otorhinolaryngology
Emenike Ejiogu			Professor of electrical and electronics engineering from University of Nigeria Nsukka
Ogbonna Oparaku			Professor of electronic engineering from the University of Nigeria, Nsukka

=== Historians ===
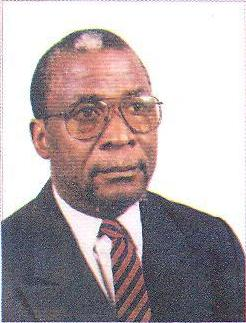
Adiele Afigbo

Name	Born	Death	Notability	Reference
Adiele Afigbo	22 November 1937	9 March 2009	Historian known for the history and historiography of Africa, more particularly Igbo history	
Kenneth Dike	17 December 1917	26 October 1983		
Paul Robeson, Jr.	2 November 1927	26 April 2014		

=== Philosophers ===
Name	Born	Death	Notability	Reference
Emmanuel Chukwudi Eze	18 January 1963	30 December 2007		

== Heads of organizations and business executives ==
Pearlena Igbokwe			President of Universal Television, a subsidiary of NBCUniversal Television Group, first woman of African descent to head a major U.S. television studio
Nduka Obaigbena			Media mogul, founder of Nigerian-based African newspaper THISDAY, African -focused style & culture magazine Arise and Lagos-based Nigerian 24-hour international news channel Arise News
Jim Ovia			Nigerian businessman; founder of Zenith Bank
Jerome Udoji			
Louis Odumegwu Ojukwu	1909	1966	Business mogul and father of Chukwuemeka Ojukwu, the former governor of the Eastern Region and leader of Biafra
P. N. Okeke-Ojiudu	1914	1995	
Omu Okwei	1872	1943	Merchant queen of the River Niger
C. T. Onyekwelu	1898		
Mathias Ugochukwu	1926	1990	
Evelyn Okere	4 November 1973		Nigerian businesswoman, publisher, fashion designer and the Managing Director/CEO of St. Eve Concepts.
Godwin Maduka			Nigerian doctor, businessman, philanthropist and the founder of Las Vegas Pain Institute and Medical Center
Emeka Offor			Businessman and Philanthropist. The founder and chairman and The Sir Emeka Of for Foundation of Chrome Group
Kennedy Okonkwo			Businessman and philanthropist
Charles Nwodo Jr.			Businessman and philanthropist
Aku Odinkemelu			Nigerian lawyer and corporate entrepreneur
Nwamaka Okoye			Nigerian businesswoman and serial entrepreneur, founder of Housessories Ltd, Gearshift Africa, former president of Stanford Seed Transformation Program Nigeria

== Economists ==
- Arunma Oteh, Vice President and Treasurer at World Bank
- Charles Chukwuma Soludo, economics professor and former Governor and chairman of the board of directors of the Central Bank of Nigeria (CBN)
- Godwin Emefiele, Governor of the Central Bank of Nigeria
- Ngozi Okonjo-Iweala, former Finance Minister and Foreign Minister of Nigeria, notable for being the first woman to hold either of those positions. She is also a former World Bank managing director and a one-time Presidential candidate of the same institution, member Twitter board
- Obiageli Ezekwesili, former Vice President of the World Bank and Education Minister as well as a co-founder of Transparency International
- Okwu Joseph Nnanna, former deputy Governor of Economic Policy and deputy Governor of Financial System Stability at Central Bank of Nigeria
- Onyema Ugochukwu, economist, journalist, and politician
- Pat Utomi
- Pius Okigbo
- Priscilla Ekwere Eleje, first Nigerian female to have her signature appended on the naira and current Director of currency operations, Central Bank of Nigeria

== Bloggers ==
- Linda Ikeji
- Noble Igwe
- Uche Eze

== Journalists ==
Name	Born	Death	Notability	Reference
Adaora Udoji	1967	–		
Chinweizu	1943			
Christina Anyanwu	1951	–		
Chude Jideonwo				
Chima Simone	28 July 1976			
Joseph Egemonye	1933	2011		

== Judges ==
- Chile Eboe-Osuji, Judge of the International Criminal Court
- Pats Acholonu (1936–2006), Supreme Court of Nigeria justice
- Chukwudifu Oputa (1924–2014), supreme Court of Nigeria justice

== Political figures ==
=== Activists ===
Name	Born	Death	Notability	Reference
Gogo Chu Nzeribe				
Okey Ndibe	1960	–	Novelist, poet, political activist from Yola, Nigeria. He is the author of Arrows of Rain, a critically well-reviewed novel published in 2000.	
Uzor Ngoladi	1977	-	Nwriter, journalist, and activist.	
Chidi Odinkalu	1968	-	Writer, Lawyer, activist, Professor, International Human Rights Law	

=== Military rulers ===
- Major (Dr.) Albert Okonkwo, Military Administrator of the Mid-Western State of Nigeria in mid-1967 during an attempt to establish the region as the independent Republic of Benin early in the Nigerian Civil War

=== Monarchs ===
- Obi Prof Joseph Chike Edozien, the Asagba of Asaba
- Igwe Nnaemeka Alfred Ugochukwu Achebe, Obi of Onitsha

=== Politicians ===
Name	Born	Death	Notability	Reference
Nnamdi Azikiwe	1904	1966	1st president of Nigeria	
Kasim Reed			57th Mayor of Atlanta, Georgia, US (2010–2018)	
Azuka Okwuosa	3 November 1959		Former Anambra State Commissioner for Works and Transport	
Benjamin Kalu			Member of House of Representatives, representing Bende federal constituency	
Enyinnaya Abaribe				
Chuka Umunna	17 October 1978	–		
Catherine Obianuju Acholonu				
Johnson Aguiyi-Ironsi	3 March 1924	29 July 1966	First military and second substantial Head of State of Nigeria	
Igwe Aja-Nwachukwu				
John Abraham Godson	25 November 1970		First Black Member of the Polish Parliament in Polish history. Nigerian Senatorial Candidate.	
Frank Ajobena				
Dora Akunyili	14 July 1954	7 June 2014	Former Director General of National Agency for Food and Drug Administration and Control (NAFDAC) of Nigeria and current (since 17 December 2008) Nigerian Minister of Information and Communications.	
Rotimi Amaechi	27 May 1965	–	former Governor of Rivers State and current minister of transportation	
Bonaventure Enemali	21 June 1984	–	Commissioner for Youth Empowerment and Creative Economy in Anambra State	
Chris Okewulonu	24 December 1960	–	Current Chief of Staff to Imo State Government	
Collins Nweke	14 July 1965	–	Municipal Legislator Ostend City Council Belgium and former Chairman of Nigerians in Diaspora Europe	
Emeka Anyaoku	18 January 1933	–	Former Secretary-General of the Commonwealth of Nations	
Nnamdi Azikiwe	16 November 1904	11 May 1996	Nigeria's foremost President and the Owelle of Onitsha	
Chukwuemeka Chikelu				
Uche Chukwumerije				
Edward Wilmot Blyden	3 August 1832	7 February 1912	Americo-Liberian educator, writer, diplomat, and politician in Liberia and Sierra Leone.	
Kema Chikwe			Academic and politician; former federal minister of transport and later minister of aviation; and former Nigeria's ambassador to Ireland	
Alex Ifeanyichukwu Ekwueme	1932	–	Renowned architect, lawyer, and politician. Formerly, vice-president of the 2nd federal republic of Nigeria (1979 - 1983)	
Martin Elechi			Former Governor of Ebonyi State	
Dave Umahi			Current Governor of Ebonyi State	
Evan Enwerem	29 October 1935	2 August 2007		
Virginia Etiaba			Educator; politician; former deputy governor (and briefly governor) of Anambra State.	
Herbert Eze				
Akanu Ibiam	29 November 1906	December 1995	Medical missionary who later became the first governor of the Eastern Region from 1960 to 1966. The Enugu International Airport is named after him.	
Toni Iwobi				
Maurice Iwu	21 April 1950	–	Former head of INEC	
Emmanuel Iwuanyanwu	4 September 1942	–		
Orji Uzor Kalu	21 April 1960	–	Oligarch and former governor of Abia State	
K. O. Mbadiwe				
Ojo Maduekwe	6 May 1945	–	Former Federal Minister under Obasanjo and Yar'Adua administrations.	
Chinwoke Mbadinuju				
Sam Mbakwe	1929	5 January 2004	One of the chief former governors of Imo State. The international cargo airport in Owerri is named after him.	
Chris Ngige	8 August 1952	–	Former governor of Anambra State	
Akachukwu Sullivan Nwankpo	1962		Former Special Advisor to the President Goodluck Jonathan on Technical Matters	
Nkechi Justina Nwaogu	1956		Senator who represents the People's Democratic Party in Abia State.	
Chimaroke Nnamani	10 April 1959	–	Former governor of Enugu State	
Obiageli Ezekwesili	28 April 1963	–	Former Vice President of the World Bank and Education Minister as well as a co-founder of Transparency International.	
Ike Nwachukwu				
Frank Nweke				
Chinyere Ike Nwosu				
Zacheus Chukwukaelo Obi				
Peter Obi	19 July 1961	–	Former Governor of Anambra State, the Vice Chairman of the Nigerian Governors' Forum and the Chairman of the Southeast Governors' Forum.	
George Obiozor				
Peter Odili	15 August 1948	–	Former governor of Rivers State.	
Igwegbe Odum				
Frank Ogbuewu				
Vincent Eze Ogbulafor				
Joy Ogwu				
Chukwuemeka Odumegwu Ojukwu	4 November 1933	26 November 2011	Military officer and politician who served as the military governor of the Eastern Region of Nigeria in 1966 and the leader of the breakaway Republic of Biafra from 1967 to 1970.	
Prince B.B Apugo	5 November 1951		Nigerian politician, philanthropist and businessman, one of the founding fathers of the People's Democratic Party (PDP) and a current Board of Trustees Member of the All Progressive Congress (APC)	
Chuba Okadigbo				
Edward Ikem Okeke				
P. N. Okeke-Ojiudu				
Ngozi Okonjo-Iweala	13 June 1954	–	Current Finance Minister and former Foreign Minister of Nigeria, notable for being the first woman to hold either of those positions.	
Richard Okonye	1943	1999		
Ifeanyi Okowa			Governor of Delta State, fmr senator of Nigeria	
Jaycee Okwunwanne	8 October 1985	–		
Nwafor Orizu				
Alex Otti	18 February 1965		Nigerian economist, banker, investor, philanthropist, and politician, serving as the current Governor of Abia State in Nigeria	
Theodore Orji	11 November 1950	–	Former governor of Abia State.	
Dennis Osadebay	29 June 1911	26 December 1994	Nigerian politician, poet, journalist and former premier of the now defunct Mid-Western Region of Nigeria, which now comprises Edo and Delta State.	
Edward James Roye	3 February 1815	11 February 1872	Fifth President of Liberia from 1870 to his overthrow and subsequent death in 1871.	
Andy Uba				
Achike Udenwa	1948	–	Former governor of Imo State.	
Onyema Ugochukwu				
Sylvester Ugoh				
Charles Ugwuh				
Emmanuel Ukaegbu				
Jaja Wachuku	1918	1996		
Chukwuemeka Ngozichineke Wogu		–		

=== Military ===
Name	Born	Death	Notability	Reference
Okoro Idozuka				
Emeka Onwuamaegbu				
Aguiyi Ironsi	1924	1966	The first military head of state of Nigeria. He assumed power after the 1966 military coup that killed the then Prime Minister, Sir Alhaji Abubakar Tafawa Balewa. After 6 months in power, he was killed in a counter coup led by his eventual successor, General Yakubu Gowon and General Theophilus Danjuma.	
Chukwuemeka Odumegwu Ojukwu				
Chukwuma Kaduna Nzeogwu				
Azubuike Ihejirika				
Ebitu Ukiwe				
Ejike Obumneme Aghanya				

== Scientists & inventors ==
Name	Born	Death	Notability	Reference
Chigozie C. Asiabaka	29 September 1953		Agricultural scientist	
Charles Ejogo				
Philip Emeagwali	1954	–	Computer scientist/geologist, one of two winners of the 1989 Gordon Bell Prize, a prize from the IEEE, for his use of the Connection Machine supercomputer	
Bisi Ezerioha	6 January 1972		Engineer, entrepreneur	
Ejikeme Patrick Nwosu	4 February 1983		Scientist, Inventor	
Bartholomew Nnaji				
John Ogbu	9 May 1939	20 August 2003		
Chike Obi	7 April 1921	13 March 2008	Mathematician	
Ike Ferdinand Odimegwu			Philosopher	
Josephat Obi Oguejiofor			Philosopher	
Rita Orji
Gordian Ezekwe	1929	25 June 1997	Professor of Mechanical Engineering, Minister of Science and Technology, inventor	
F. Nnabuenyi Ugonna	12 October 1936	5 June 1990		
Fabian Udekwu	1928	17 November 2006	Cardiac surgeon, distinguished professor of surgery at the University of Nigeria Nsukka, and a pioneer of open-heart surgery in Africa	
Walter Enwezor		Agricultural scientist		

== Sports ==
- Chioma Ajunwa, first female African Olympic gold medallist
- Chioma Igwe
- Ugochukwu Monye

=== American football players ===
- Adimchinobi Echemandu, American football running back who is a free agent. He was originally drafted by the Cleveland Browns in the seventh round of the 2004 NFL draft
- Amobi Okoye
- Buchie Ibeh
- Chidi Iwuoma
- Chike Okeafor
- Chinedum Ndukwe
- Christian Okoye
- Chukky Okobi
- Emmanuel Acho
- Iheanyi Uwaezuoke
- Ike Ndukwe
- Isaiah Ekejiuba
- Kelechi Osemele
- Kenechi Udeze
- N. D. Kalu
- Nnamdi Asomugha, American football cornerback for the Oakland Raiders of the National Football League, husband of actress Kerry Washington
- Obed Ariri, American football placekicker in the National Football League
- Osi Umenyiora
- Patrick Chukwurah
- Tony Ugoh
- Victor Abiamiri, Defensive end for the Philadelphia Eagles of the National Football League

=== Canadian football players ===
Name	Born	Death	Notability	Reference
Uzooma Okeke	3 September 1970	–	Canadian Football League tackle for the Montreal Alouettes.	

=== Athletes ===
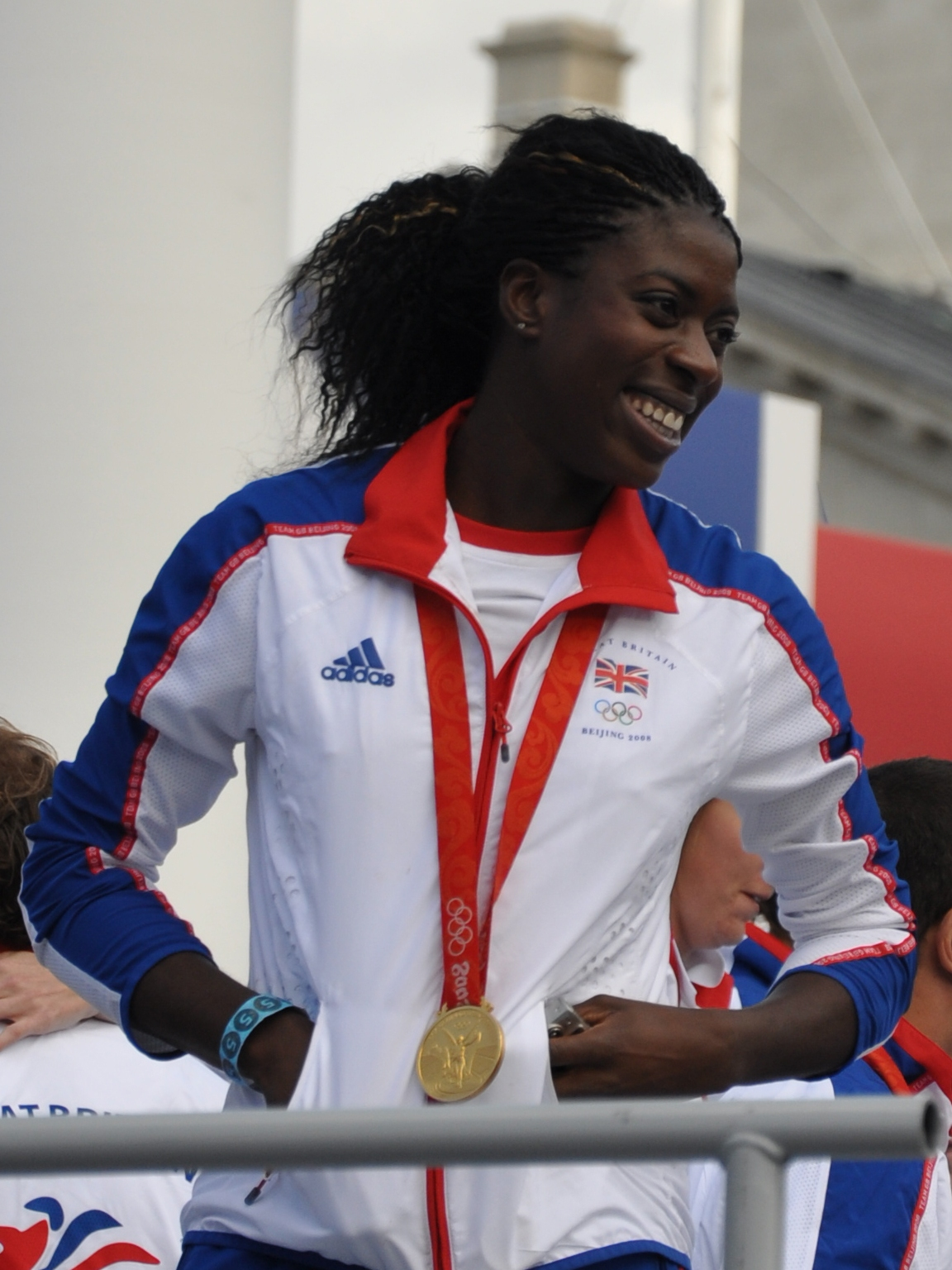
Christine Ohuruogu

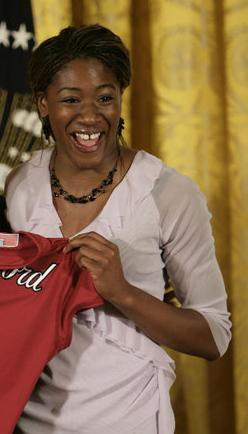
Ogonna Nnamani

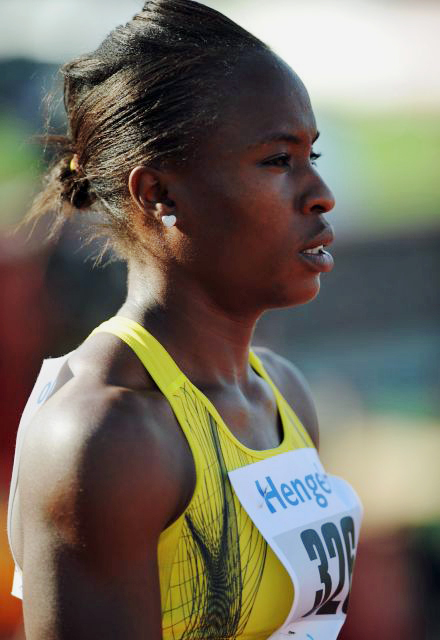
Marilyn Okoro

Name	Born	Death	Notability	Reference
Chioma Ajunwa	25 December 1970	—		
Onochie Achike	31 January 1975	–		
Kriss Akabusi	28 November 1958	–		
Chinaza Amadi	12 September 1987	–		
Clement Chukwu	7 July 1973	–		
Vivian Chukwuemeka	4 May 1975	–		
Innocent Egbunike	30 November 1961	–		
Uchenna Emedolu	17 September 1976	–		
Obinna Eregbu	9 November 1969	–		
Joy Eze	23 April 1988	–		
Davidson Ezinwa	22 November 1971	–		
Osmond Ezinwa	22 November 1971	–		
Chidi Imoh	27 August 1963	–		
Obinna Metu	12 July 1988	–		
Ngozi Monu	7 January 1981	–		
Ogonna Nnamani	29 July 1983	–		
Francis Obikwelu	22 November 1978	–		
Chinonye Ohadugha	24 March 1986	–		
Christine Ohuruogu	17 May 1984	–	MBE an English sprinter former World and Olympic Champion in the 400 metres	
Emmanuel Okoli	13 November 1973	–		
Marilyn Okoro	23 September 1984	–		
Christy Opara-Thompson	24 December 1971	–		
Charity Opara	20 May 1972	–		
Emeka Udechuku	10 July 1979	–		
Chima Ugwu	19 July 1973	–		

=== Basketball players ===
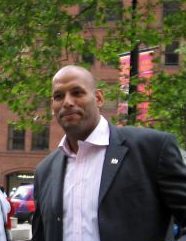
John Amaechi

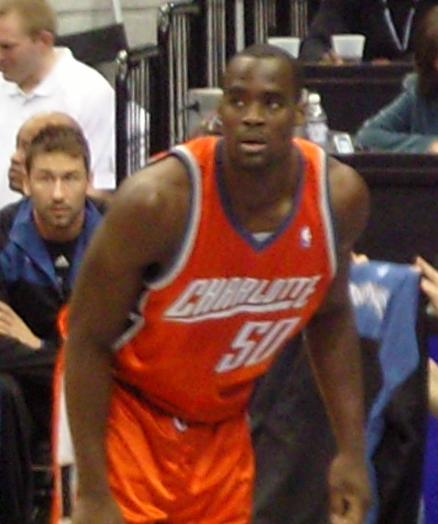
Emeka Okafor

Name	Born	Death	Notability	Reference
John Amaechi	26 November 1970	–	Retired American-born English NBA basketball player who currently works as a broadcaster and political activist in the United Kingdom.	
Aloysius Anagonye	10 February 1981	–		
Giannis Antetokounmpo	6 December 1994	–	Greek NBA player with the Milwaukee Bucks; NBA champion in the 2020-21 season. Igbo mother and Yoruba father.	
Kelenna Azubuike	16 December 1983	–		
Thanasis Antetokounmpo	18 July 1992	–		
Kostas Antetokounmpo	20 November 1997	–		
Ike Diogu	11 September 1983	–		
Obinna Ekezie	22 August 1975	–		
Benjamin Eze	8 February 1981	–		
Ekene Ibekwe	19 July 1985	–		
Ike Nwankwo	27 December 1973	–		
Julius Nwosu	1 May 1971	–		
Chamberlain Oguchi	28 April 1986	–		
Emeka Okafor	28 September 1982	–		
Daniel Okonkwo	1975	–		
Ime Udoka	9 August 1977	–		
Mfon Udoka	16 June 1976	–		

=== Boxers ===
Name	Born	Death	Notability	Reference
Friday Ahunanya	19 November 1971	–		
Innocent Anyanwu	25 September 1982	–		
Ijeoma Egbunine	30 December 1980	–		
Herbie Hide				
Ike Ibeabuchi	2 February 1973	–		
Emmanuel Nwodo	19 February 1974	–		
Dick Tiger (alias Richard Ihetu)	14 August 1929	14 December 1971	Boxer from Amaigbo, Orlu, Nigeria, was a migrant fighter to Liverpool (and later to America).	

=== Footballers ===
Name	Born	Death	Notability	Reference
Samuel Okwaraji	19 May 1964	12 August 1989		
Victor Agali	29 December 1978	–		
Festus Agu	13 March 1975	–		
Lawrence Akandu	10 December 1974	–		
Chukwuma Akabueze	6 May 1989	–		
Michael Chidi Alozi				
Emmanuel Amuneke	25 December 1970	–		
Kevin Amuneke	10 May 1986	–		
Blessing Chinedu	22 November 1976	–		
Kevin Amuneke	10 May 1986	–		
Victor Anichebe	23 April 1988	–		
Nnaemeka Anyanwu	21 August 1988	–		
Onyekachi Apam	30 December 1986	–		
Alex Iwobi	3 May 1996	-		
Chibuzor Chilaka	21 October 1986	–		
Chukwudi Chijindu	20 February 1986	–		
Blessing Chinedu	22 November 1976	–		
Christian Chukwu				
Eric Obinna Chukwunyelu	10 June 1981	–		
Carlton Cole				
Ugo Ehiogu	3 November 1972	–		
Eric Ejiofor	17 December 1979	–		
Chijioke Ejiogu	22 November 1984	–		
Caleb Ekwegwo	1 August 1988	–		
Ifeanyi Emeghara	24 March 1984	–		
Hugo Enyinnaya	8 May 1981	–		
Dino Eze	1 June 1984	–		
Ndubuisi Eze	10 May 1984	–		
Victor Ezeji	9 June 1981	–		
Emeka Ifejiagwa	30 October 1977	–		
Amaechi Igwe	20 May 1988	–		
Ugo Ihemelu	3 April 1983	–		
Ikechukwu Kalu	18 April 1984	–		
Maxwell Kalu	23 March 1976	–		
Christopher Kanu	4 December 1979	–		
Nwankwo Kanu	1 August 1976	–	Nwankwo Kanu (born 1 August 1976 in Owerri, Nigeria), usually known simply as Kanu and nicknamed Papilo, is a professional footballer who plays as a striker for the Nigerian national team and for English club Portsmouth.	
Henry Nwosu Kanu	14 February 1980	–		
Stephen Keshi	1962	2016	Former Nigerian soccer team captain and coach, won the African Cup of Nations both as player and coach	
Paul McGrath	4 December 1959	–	England-born Republic of Ireland international player. Irish mother and Igbo biological father.	
Usim Nduka	23 September 1985	–		
Chukwuemeka Nwadike	9 August 1978	–		
Obinna Nwaneri	19 March 1982	–		
Onyekachi Nwoha	28 February 1983	–		
Chucks Nwoko	21 November 197	–		
Udo Nwoko	15 October 1984	–		
Henry Nwosu	14 June 1963	–		
Mikel John Obi	22 April 1987	–	Won the UEFA Champions League with Chelsea in 2012	
Victor Nsofor Obinna	25 March 1987	–		
Chinedu Obasi	1 June 1986	–		
Ibezito Ogbonna	27 March 1983	–		
Bertrand Okafor	4 January 1990	–		
Uche Okafor	8 August 1967	6 January 2011		
Uche Okafor	10 February 1991	–		
Uche Okechukwu	27 September 1967	–		
Jay-Jay Okocha	14 August 1973	–		
Chima Okorie	8 October 1968	–		
Stanley Okoro	8 December 1992	–		
Sunday Patrick Okoro	27 April 1986	–		
Digger Okonkwo	30 August 1977	–		
Onyekachi Okonkwo	13 May 1982	–		
Isaac Okoronkwo	1 May 1978	–		
Kelechi Okoye	1984	–		
Sunday Oliseh		–		
Tochukwu Oluehi	3 June 1988			
Nedum Onuoha	12 November 1986			
Iffy Onuora	28 July 1967	–		
Chima Onyeike	21 June 1975	–		
Obi Onyeike	25 June 1992	–		
Daniel Onyekachi	23 August 1985	–		
Oguchi Onyewu	13 May 1982	–		
Henry Onyekuru	5 June 1997	–		
Kelechi Osunwa	15 October 1984	–		
Chioma Ubogagu	10 September 1992	–		
Ikechukwu Uche	5 January 1984	–		
Oguchi Uche	1987	–		
Nduka Ugbade			Former Nigerian football player, first African to lift the world cup	
John Ugochukwu	20 April 1988	–		
Magalan Ugochukwu	20 June 1990	–		
Ugo Ukah	18 January 1984	–		
Ejike Uzoenyi				
Eke Uzoma	19 July 1989	–		
Samuel Chukwueze	22 May 1999	–		
Carney Chukwuemeka	20 October 2003	_		

=== Rugby ===
- Martin Offiah

=== Martial arts ===
Name	Born	Death	Notability	Reference
Chika Chukwumerije	30 December 1983	–	Olympic silver medallist	
Anthony Njokuani	1 March 1980	–		
Jacob Martins Obiorah	27 March 1974	–		
Chukwuemeka Onyemachi	28 July 1974	–		

== Religion ==
- Agnes Okoh (1905–1995), Founder of Christ Holy Church International, African Independent Church in Nigeria
- Cyprian Michael Iwene Tansi (1903–1964), beatified by Pope Benedict XVI
- Francis Arinze, Cardinal of the Roman Catholic Church
- Peter Ebere Okpaleke, Cardinal of the Roman Catholic Church
- Lazarus Muoka
- Uma Ukpai
- T.D. Jakes
- Valerian Okeke, Catholic Archbishop of Onitsha Archdiocese and Metropolitan of Onitsha Ecclesiastical Province
- William Drew Robeson I (1844–1918), father of Paul Robeson and the minister of Witherspoon Street Presbyterian Church in Princeton, New Jersey from 1880 to 1901
- William Napoleon Barleycorn (1884–1925), Spanish Guinean Primitive Methodist missionary and author of the first Bube language primer. He was a member of a prominent Fernandino family
