= Onikwu =

Onikwu is a community in Rivers State, Nigeria. Onikwu is self-contained district or community within Ndoni town, distance is about 6.4 km from Ndoni to Onikwu. The name "Oni-kwu/Nd-oni, Ndoni also pronounce Nde-Oni means Oni people while Oni-ukwu meaning the elder of Oni people. In Ukwuani-Aboh-Ndoni language (Igboid) ukwu means elder, and Nde means people of. Onikwu and Ndoni are of same ethnic group located in Ogba Egbema/Ndoni Local government of Rivers State. The community alongside them have other neighboring villages which include Ase-Azaga, Isukwa, Odugiri. Agwe, Ugbaja, Isala Ase-Imoniteh and Ogbe-Ogene. All of the said communities are located in the Central Niger Delta region, south-south Nigeria.

== Origin ==
The (Onikwu/Ndoni) are related to the Aboh people of Ndokwa Nation, present day Delta State and Edo State. Onikwu/Ndoni people are Aboh origin. They share the same linguistic and cultural heritage with other Igbo-related ethnic groups like Ukwuani, Ikwerre, Anioma people, Ika, and Ekpeye. They Speak Ndoni, a variant of the Ndokwa Ukwuani language. Ukwuani-Eboh-Ndoni language is among the 26 languages approved by the Federal Govt of Nigeria for mother tongue education.

== Language ==
Ukwuani-Aboh-Ndoni language is an Igboid Language, sometimes considered as a dialect of the main Igbo language group. Onikwu and Ndoni people share lots of cultural and linguistic grounds with Igbo and Bini people.

== Notable people ==
Peter Odili was elected governor of Rivers State from 1999, and was reelected in April 2003 to 2007.

Agnes Okoh founder of Christ Holy Church International.

== Season/2012 Flood ==
Nigeria, like the rest of West Africa and other tropical lands, has only two seasons. These are the Dry season and the Rainy season. The dry season is accompanied by a dust laden airmass from the Sahara Desert, locally known as Harmattan, or by its main name, The Tropical Continental (CT) airmass, while the rainy season is heavily influenced by an airmass originating from the south Atlantic Ocean, locally known as the south west wind, or by its main name, The Tropical Maritime (MT) airmass. These two major wind systems in Nigeria are known as the trade winds. The region Onikwu/Ndoni is flood prone communities, this is because the inland part of Rivers state consists of tropical rainforest; towards the coast the typical Niger Delta environment features many mangrove swamps, beside that the communities lies along the Niger Delta Central coastal region.

In October 2012, villages like Ndoni, Ase-Azaga, Isukwa, Odugiri. Agwe, Onikwu, Ugbaja, Isala and Ogbe-Ogene were badly hit by the flood.

== Sources ==
- Wikina, B. (2011, March 9). Gov. amaechi commends onelga people….gets chieftaincy title in ndoni featured. Retrieved from http://www.riversstate.gov.ng/item/429-gov-amaechi-commends-onelga-peoplegets-chieftaincy-title-in-ndoni.html
- Ukwuani-aboh-ndoni. (n.d.). Retrieved from http://www.ethnologue.com/show_language.asp?code=ukw
- Oduro, T. (2007). Christ holy church international . Retrieved from https://web.archive.org/web/20160708171340/http://dacb.org/stories/nigeria/okoh_agnes.html
- Monarch canvasses dev training for youths. (2010, November 26). Retrieved from http://www.thetidenewsonline.com/2010/11/26/monarch-canvasses-dev-training-for-youths/
- Onukwugha, A. (2012, October 10). Rivers flood: Tear flows freely in 24 communities. Retrieved from http://www.leadership.ng/nga/articles/36828/2012/10/08/rivers_flood_tear_flows_freely_24_communities.html
