= Ugonna =

Ugonna is a masculine given name of Igbo origin that means "the eagle of the father". The eagle is a symbol of honor in the Igbo tradition. It is occasionally used as a surname. Notable people with the name include:

- Ugonna Anyora (born 1991), Nigerian footballer
- Ugonna Okegwo (born 1962), German-Nigerian jazz bassist
- Ugonna Onyekwe (born 1979), British-Nigerian basketball player
- Ugonna Onyenso (born 2004), Nigerian basketball player
- Ugonna Ozurigbo (born 1976), Nigerian politician
- Ugonna Umerou, Nigerian designer
- Ugonna Uzochukwu, Nigerian footballer
- F. Nnabuenyi Ugonna (1936–1990), Nigerian ethnologist
- Nnadozie Ugonna Ezenwaka (born 1994), Nigerian footballer
