= Onuora =

Onuora is a Nigerian surname which may refer to the following people:

== People ==
- Anyika Onuora (born 1984), British sprint athlete
- Iffy Onuora (born 1967), Scottish football player and coach
- Oku Onuora, Jamaican dub poet

== See also ==
- Onuora Nzekwu (born 1928), Nigerian professor and writer on Igbo culture
