= Irefi =

Village in Anambra, Nigeria

Irefi is one of the four villages in Oraifite in Ekwusigo Local Government Area of Anambra State of Nigeria. Others are Unodu, Ezumeri, and Ifite. Nkwo-Edo market is situated there.

== Notable people ==
- Azuka Okwuosa – former Anambra State Commissioner for Works and Transport
