= Zain Asher =

British news anchor

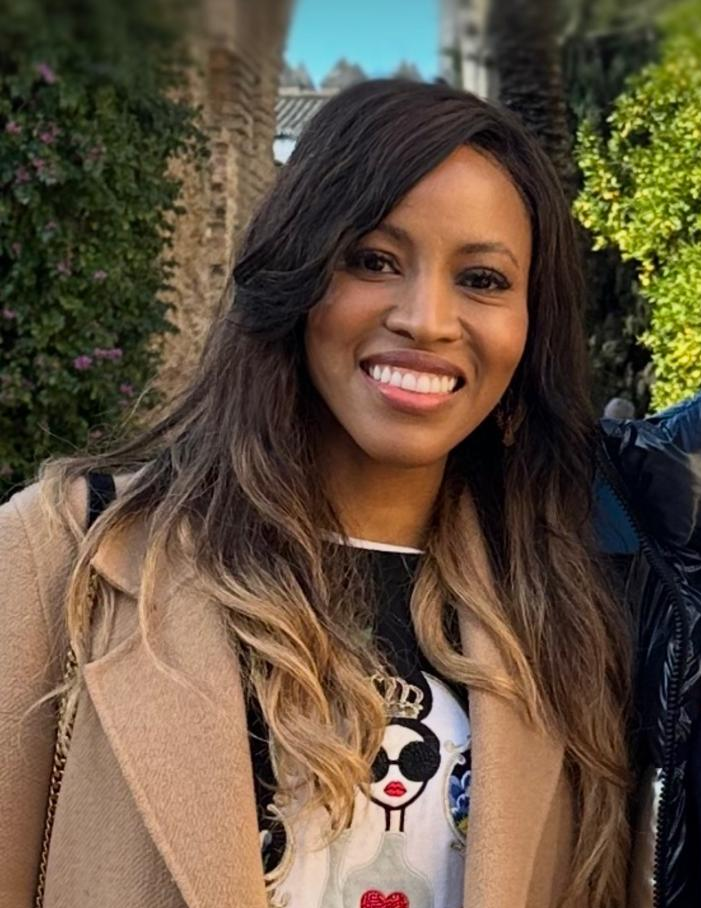
- Born: Zaina Ejiofor; Balham, London Borough of Wandsworth, England
- Education: Keble College, Oxford (BA); Columbia University (MS)
- Occupations: Anchor, journalist
- Years active: 2006–present
- Spouse: Steve Peoples
- Children: 2
- Relatives: Chiwetel Ejiofor (brother)

Zain Ejiofor Asher (née Ejiofor, /ˈɛdʒioʊfɔːr/) is a British news anchor at CNN International, based in New York City. She currently anchors the network's primetime, global news show One World airing weekdays at 11 pm ET. Her memoir Where The Children Take Us was published by HarperCollins in April 2022.

== Early life and education ==
Asher was born to Nigerian parents in London and grew up in West Norwood, South London. Her mother, Obiajulu, was a pharmacist working in Brixton, and her father, Arinze, was a physician. In 1988, her father died in a car accident during a road trip in Nigeria, when she was five years old. Her elder brother is actor Chiwetel Ejiofor, known for his role in the film 12 Years a Slave. She is also the elder sister to Kandi Ejiofor, a physician in England.

Asher attended Oxford University and graduated in 2005 with a degree in French and Spanish. The following year, she attended the Graduate School of Journalism at Columbia University, in New York City. In 2021, she was named an honorary fellow of Keble College, Oxford University.

== Early career ==
After graduation, Asher initially worked as a receptionist at a production company before becoming a freelance reporter at News 12 Brooklyn where she covered local news. She also worked as a reporter for Money, where she wrote personal finance articles about careers and investing before moving to CNN.

== CNN ==
In 2012, Asher met a CNN executive who invited her to the company headquarters in New York for a screen test. She was first hired as a business correspondent before becoming an anchor at CNN International based in Atlanta. In 2014, she reported from Abuja, Nigeria, on the hundreds of Chibok schoolgirls kidnapped by Boko Haram. She has also anchored breaking news coverage of the August 2020 explosion in Beirut, the October 2020 End SARS protests in Nigeria, Russia's war in Ukraine, the death of Queen Elizabeth II and the Gaza war. Since 2021, she has anchored One World with Zain Asher, airing weekdays on CNNI.

Former One World co-anchor Bianna Golodryga exited CNN on 23 October 2026.

== Book ==
Her memoir Where The Children Take Us was released by HarperCollins on 26 April 2022. The book was inspired by her 2015 Tedx talk "Trust Your Struggle", which has been viewed 2.2 million times on YouTube as of 2022. It tells the story of how her mother, widowed and raising four children, worked to fulfil her and her husband's original dream of moving to England to ensure their children had an excellent education and opportunity; the results are visible in the journalist, the actor, the medical doctor and the entrepreneur that Asher and her siblings have become.

== Personal life ==
Asher resides in Montclair, New Jersey, with her Associated Press reporter husband, Steve Peoples, and their two sons. She is of Igbo descent; her family is originally from Enugu State, Nigeria.

== See also ==
- List of Igbo people
- New Yorkers in journalism
