= Mama Uka =

Nigerian comedian

Chukwueze Odinaka (born 18 August 1991) professionally known as Mama Uka is a Nigerian comedian and content creator who shoots comedy using the guise of an elderly woman.

== Early life and education ==
Mama Uka was born on 18 August 1991 in Amachalla, Enugu-Ezike in Igbo Eze North local government area of Enugu State, where he attended his primary and secondary education before proceeding to Institute of Management and Technology, Enugu (IMT), where he obtained a degree in computer science. He is the second to the last child of his family.

== Career ==
Mama Uka, who is regarded as a "leading figure in the Nigerian comedy industry", uses Facebook as his main outlet while dressing like an elderly woman. Mama Uka, who is also a singer and producer, started his comedic acts in 2016 while a student at IMT, Enugu and cites Lasisi Elenu and Tyler Perry as his role model. He has over 2.8million followers on facebook. His comedy lines tackled everyday situations.

== Personal life ==
Mama Uka has a daughter with Dera whom he broke up with on 14 February 2022. His baby Mama frustrates his efforts build their love affairs into marriage. She disappeared when he was on his way to propose to her 8 years ago. He has been with her since 2015. He went to Enugu on February 14, 2022 to propose to her but she wasn't around. He traced her to Ntachi Osa (food joint) and caught her with another guy.
