= Ogechukwukanma Ogwo =

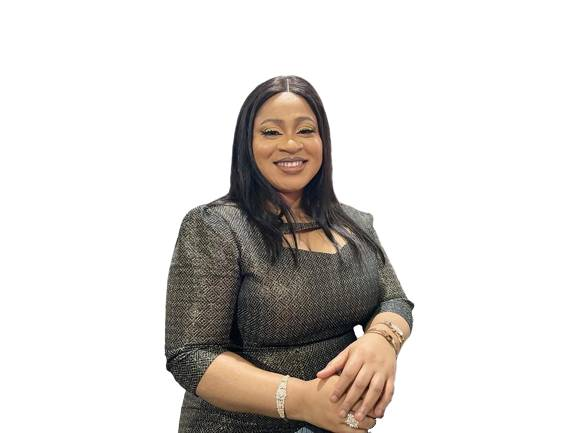
- Ogechukwukanma Ogwo
- Born: Ogwo; 8 September 1968 (age 57); Ogun State, Nigeria
- Citizenship: Nigerian
- Occupations: Broadcaster, radio presenter
- Employers: RayPower FM radio; Rock Radio; Sports Radio 88.9 Brila FM
- Notable work: Top 10 Countdown; The Sunday Morning Show
- Awards: Most Popular Sports Radio Presenter; Best Sportscaster on Radio

Ogechukwukanma Ogwo is a Nigerian broadcaster and radio presenter and as a sports analyst after a stint with Raypower FM.

== Early life ==
She started off with a programme called Straight from the Heart on RayPower FM radio in April 2002. She then became a presenter anchoring other programmes like the Top 10 Countdown Show and Rock Radio.

== Career ==
In August 2003, she auditioned for and got a job with Sports Radio 88.9 Brila FM in Lagos, Nigeria. Ogwo hosted different programmes in Brila FM including Whistles Of The Night, The Afternoon Blazing Drive, Top 8 Countdown, The Sunday Morning Show and The Super Morning show. She has hosted top Nigerian entertainment celebrities in these programmes like Tuface, DBanj, Don Jazzy, Ali baba, Mike Ezuruonye, Rita Dominic, Olamide, Kenny & D1, Omawumi, among others. She moved into sports broadcasting and hosted some sport shows like The Afternoon Show, The Lunch Hour Sports Cruise, and Saturday Breakfast Show. Sports celebrities that participated in her show include Obafemi Martins, John Fashanu, Taiye Taiwo and Abedi Pele.

She is a recipient of the Nigerian Broadcasters Merit Awards after she won the female categories of the "Most Popular Sports Radio Presenter" and "Best Sportscaster on Radio" in 2012 and 2016, respectively.

== Personal life ==
Oge has been on the top of sports broadcasting for more than 12 years. She has hosted top celebrities like Don Jazzy and D'banj, among others.

== See also ==
- List of Igbo people
- List of Nigerian media personalities
- List of radio stations in Nigeria
- Brila FM
