= Ezumeri =

Village in Oraifite Town

Ezumeri is one of the four villages existing in Oraifite Town. The other three villages are Unodu (which consists of Ibolo, Umuezopi and Isingwu sub-units), Irefi and Ifite. It has a traditional head known as Obi
