= Edith Nwosu =

Nigerian professor of corporate law (b. 1962)

Prof Edith Nwosu
- Born: Edith Ogonnaya Nwosu; March 1962 (age 64)
- Occupations: Academic, Lawyer

Academic background
- Education: Institute of Management and Technology (IMT), Enugu; University of Nigeria Nsukka; Nigerian Law School

Academic work
- Discipline: Law of Energy and Natural Resources, Company Law, Alternative Dispute Resolution, Corporate Law
- Institutions: University of Nigeria, Nsukka

Edith Ogonnaya Nwosu is a Nigerian Professor of Corporate Law and the immediate-past Deputy Vice-Chancellor of the University of Nigeria, Enugu Campus (UNEC). Before her appointment as the DVC, she was the Associate Dean of Students Affairs and the orator of the institution.

== Early life and education ==
Nwosu was the third child in a polygamous household and the second child of Chief Maurice and Lolo Roseline Nnorom when she was born on March 22, 1962. From St. Johns' Primary School in Abakaliki, she received her First School Leaving Certificate. At Abakaliki High School, previously Presbyterian College, PRESCO, she earned her West African School Certificate. The former Anambra State University of Technology awarded her a PGDE in education in 1987, while the Institute of Management and Technology (IMT) in Enugu gave her an HND in cooperative economics and management in 1981. At the Nigerian Law School in Lagos, Edith Nwosu earned her BL. with a First Class in 1993 after graduating from the University of Nigeria in 1992 where she also received four awards for outstanding academic performance. She received her LL.M in 1997 and her PhD from the University of Nigeria Nsukka in 2009 respectively.

== Career ==
Nwosu started her academic career as an assistant lecturer in the faculty of law of the University of Nigeria, Enugu Campus in 1994. She teaches Company Law and Law of Energy and Natural Resources at the undergraduate level and Company Law at the postgraduate level. In 2011, she rose to a professor and on Thursday, 11 November 2021, she presented the 172nd Inaugural Lecture of the University of Nigeria Nsukka. The lecture was titled “Gridlock & Good Luck in Quasi-Corporate Marriages in Nigeria” and it was held at the Justice Mary Odili Auditorium of the University of Nigeria, Enugu Campus at 1:00pm.

== Administrative appointments ==
She was the Acting Head of Department of Commercial and Property Law between 2008 and 2013. The University Orator between 2011 and 2014, Associate Dean of Student Affairs Department, Enugu Campus between 2014 and 2018. She was also a vice chairperson and chairperson of the International Federation of Women Lawyers (FIDA) Enugu State. In 2018, she was appointed as the Deputy Vice Chancellor of the University of Nigeria, Enugu Campus and re-elected in 2021 which ended on March 7, 2023.

== Membership ==
She is a member of Nigerian Bar Association, International Federation of Women Lawyers (FIDA), Enugu State Branch and Nigerian Association of Law Teachers.

== Selected publications ==
- Nwosu, E. (2015). Nigeria. Millennium Goals and NEEDS: the.
- Ogbuabor, C. A., Nwosu, E. O., & Ezike, E. O. (2014). Mainstreaming ADR in Nigeria’s Criminal Justice System.
- Nwosu, E. O., Ajibo, C. C., Nwoke, U., Okoli, I., & Nwodo, F. (2021). Promoting Nigerian capital market development through the protection of minority shareholders: a re-assessment of enforcement pathways. Commonwealth Law Bulletin, 47(4), 625–642.
- Eze, D. U., Nwosu, E. O., Umahi, O. T., & Nwoke, U. (2022). Assessing the Application of the Principles of Non-discrimination and Gender Equality in Relation to Devolution of Land upon Death in Nigeria. Liverpool Law Review, 1-20.
- Ogbuabor, C. A., Nwosu, E. O., & Ezike, E. O. (2014). Mainstreaming ADR in Nigeria’s Criminal Justice System. European Journal of Social Sciences, 45(1), 32–43.
