= Wand of Noble Wood =

1961 novel by Onuora Nzekwu

Wand of Noble Wood is a 1961 novel by Nigerian author Onoura Nzekwu, which was later republished by Heinemann as part of the important African Writers Series. The novel has been compared to Achebe's No Longer at Ease. The novel is deeply descriptive and explanatory of Ibo culture, one critic even describing it as "ostensibly a novel which contains as much anthropological explanation as any reader could desire." The examination of traditional culture becomes a thematic emphasis, with deep exploration of topics like tribal marriage.
