= Emma Ugolee =

Nigerian media personality

- Born: Emmanuel Chinenye Ugolee; 4 October 1975 (age 50); Jos, Plateau State, Nigeria
- Occupations: Media Personality; Tv Producer; Voice over artist; blogger; author
- Years active: 1999–present

Emmanuel Chinenye Ugolee // (born October 4, 1975), is a Nigerian media personality, producer, voice over artist and author. He was born in Jos, Plateau state.

== Early life ==
Ugolee was born in Jos, the capital city of Plateau State, in north-central region of Nigeria in 1975. He hails from Isiala Ngwa North local government area of Abia State, in the south-eastern region of Nigeria. He got married on 13 September 2013 and got divorced in 2016.

== Personal life ==
Ugolee was diagnosed with level 5 of chronic kidney failure disease (Stage 5) in 2011. He had a kidney transplant in 2012 February 22 in India. The transplant was not successful and so he inevitably returned to dialysis, a three-time weekly treatment that keeps him alive in anticipation of another transplant. He is currently on the transplant wait list with Medstar Hospital in Baltimore, Maryland. USA, where he permanently resides. He spent over $3m for 100 surgeries as well as procedures for the journey. On the 23rd of April 2021 a Kidney match was found He is married to Catherine Ugolee In a 2020 interview with ‘‘Media Room Hub’’, Ugolee stated that his marriage lasted for one year and three months. He said that the experience influenced his decision to keep his subsequent romantic relationships private."MRH March 2020 Issue: Returning From The Brink! – Emma Ugolee". Media Room Hub. 18 March 2020.

== Career ==
In 1999, while Ugolee was in the Enugu State University of Science and Technology, He had gone on a television talk show called Just Gisting on a television network known as Minaj Broadcast International to promote an upcoming school event called the ESUT Awards. The owner of the television station, Mike Ajegbo, was impressed by Ugolee. He was offered a job upon graduation. Ugolee had his first shot at broadcasting by becoming the host of the same show Just Gisting on which he was a guest a few months earlier. The most popular of the three shows was called The MBI Top 10 Countdown which was a brain child of Emmanuel and Nigeria's first ever all Ugolee music video countdown. Nigerian celebrities like Sound Sultan, Ruggedman, Mode 9 and D'banj were pioneer beneficiaries from the show's popularity. At this point in his career, Ugolee attended the Federal Radio Corporation of Nigeria Training school for broadcasters in 2002.

In 2004, Ugolee joined Globacom as an executive in the marketing communications department. He produced and presented a TV show for the company called Glo Show. In 2011, he produced his first independent television talk show called The Gist. The Gist aired on HipTV from 2015 to early 2017 when it moved to the air on national TV Network of the AIT where it is running till date. In 2018, Ugolee and his partner Ossy Achievas registered and launched the Nigerian Social Media Awards project which is designed to recognise and award outstanding Nigerians for an excellent use of social media.

In 2019, Ugolee authored his first book: A 100 Random Light Bulbs, a collection of musings, with the aim to inspire its readers to a deeper understanding of everyday issues in life.

== Awards and recognitions ==
- 2002: Hip Hop World Magazine media personality of the year.
- 2006: nominated for the Future Awards Africa for young professional of the year 2006.

== Bibliography ==
- A 100 Random Light Bulbs. Design Africa Concept Limited (17 Nov. 2019). ISBN 978-9-789-75956-9

== See also ==
- List of Nigerian media personalities
- List of Igbo people
