= Alor, Anambra =

Alor
- Town
- Nickname: Alor London
- Location in Nigeria
- Coordinates: 6°05′N 6°57′E
- Country: Nigeria
- Geo-political Zone: South-East
- State: Anambra State
- Local Government Area: Idemili South

Government
  - Type: Traditional
  - Governing Body: Igwe-In-Council, Alor People's Assembly (APA)
- Time zone: UTC+01 (WAT)
- Postal code: 434114

Alor is one of the seven communities comprising the Idemili South Local Government of Anambra State in the southeast geopolitical zone of Nigeria. It is surrounded by seven neighbouring towns, namely Oraukwu, Nnobi, Abatete, Ideani, Uke, Adazi Ani and Nnokwa. Alor has several rivers which names in most cases are derived from the major idol of the village touched by the river – Mmili Ezigbo, Mmili Nwangene, Mmili Ọhọsha, Mmili Ideọhwọlọ, Mmili Iyiogwgwu, and Mmili Ọbịaja.

== Physical Environment ==
Alor town is located within the triangle formed by the three main towns of Anambra State. Conceptually straightening out the roads connecting the towns, the northern side of the triangle is the Onitsha – Awka road, whether the expressway or the old Enugu – Onitsha road. The eastern or southeastern edge of the triangle is the connection from Awka through Agulu or Nimo, Neni, Oraukwu, Adazi Ani, Nnokwa, and Nnobi to Nnewi. The third side is Onitsha to Nnewi. Alor happens to still continue to be protected from that undesirable type of urbanization. Umuoji, Ojoto, Uke, Ideani and Abatete serve very well as such a buffer.

== Infrastructure ==
Alor has several functional road systems that prime it from the surrounding communities, adequate water reticulation, and street lights that grace the town at night. The main market day in Alor is NKWO, and on that day, traders from the villages and from neighboring towns converge at the market square (Nkwo-Alor) to trade.

== Government ==
The Traditional government of Alor consists of the Igwe (King) followed by the Ndi-Ichie (Lords), Ndi-Idi, Ndi-Ozo (orzor), Ndi-Nze (Dukes) and other titled individuals and groups E.g.:, Umu-Nna, Umu-Ada, Otu Ogbo (Age Group), Ndi-Ikom, Ndi-Nne etc. However, there are other special sceptered branches that enforce order, they are:- the Igwe-In-Council, Alor Peoples Convention (APC), Alor Development Union (ADU), the vigilante groups etc.

In October 2020, there was a tussle for the throne. Igwe MacAnthony Okonkwo was temporarily dethroned by the Governor of Anambra State, Willie Obiano for a political misconduct, this led to the uprising of a new king named Igwe Chukwumesili. This was later resolved by the government of Anambra State

Alor town has two divisions, Ezi and Ifite, corresponding to the names of the two sons of the original ancestor – Agbudugbu. Each division consists of three villages as follows:

Ezi: – Umuoshi, Etiti, and Ebenesii-Okebunoye and Ifite: – Uruezeani, Umuokwu and Ide. Each of the six villages of Alor consists of a number of quarters. Based on such factors as population, affinity, or some historical relationship, the quarters have been grouped, or in some cases left single, and each such group of quarters or single quarter referred to as an ‘Ichie Domain’. The name by which each Ichie is designated is symbolic of the geographical setting or the traditional, historical, or social experience, traits and emotions characteristic of the various localities and the people of Alor.

The Alor has numerous educated sons and daughters that are employed in manifold industries and trades both in Alor, Nigeria and overseas. Moreover, Animal husbandry, Block industries, Printing Press, Wine depot (palm wine), Palm oil mills, and Soap industries are among the few industries that can be found in Alor.

== Education ==
Alorites originally are business men and women measured in textile materials, but today, many are educated and practicing professionals. Alor was known with a slogan "Alor London" even before major civilization came into the town and ever since, it lives up to the name.but due to the crisis which has divided the community leading to lack of Electricity supply and other basic amenities, Its London status has changed to Alor Burundi signalling underdevelopment.

Alor is home to numerous nursery schools with seven primary schools and two high schools, plus other higher institutions like commercial colleges and evangelical seminaries.

== Culture ==
The culture of Alor is equivalent to its neighboring communities which are in turn consistent with general Igbo culture.

== Place of worship ==
Alor has multiple churches and denominations: Roman Catholic(St Mary's and St Charles), Anglican(St Paul's, Immanuel Church Umuoshi and St Andrews Umuokwu, Alor), Save The Lost Mission, Deeper life, Cherubim and Seraphim, Dominion City Church, Grace of God Assemblies, Odozi-Obodo, Living Faith Church (Winners Chapel), Sabbath churches etc.

== Notable people ==
Some prominent people from Alor include;

- Chief P.N. Okeke-Ojiudu - Nigerian First Republic politician, was Minister of Agriculture and businessman.
- Senator Chris Ngige - Nigeria's current minister of Labour and Employment and Former Governor of Anambra State.
- Prof Chinwe Veronica Anunobi
