= Michael Crowder =

British historian (1934–1988)

- Born: 9 June 1934; London, England
- Died: 14 August 1988 (aged 54); London, England
- Education: Hertford College, Oxford
- Occupation: Historian

Michael Crowder (9 June 1934 – 14 August 1988) was a British historian and author notable for his books on the history of Africa and particularly on the history of West Africa.

== Early life and education ==
Michael Crowder was born in London, England, on 9 June 1934, and was educated at Mill Hill School. After earning a first-class honours degree in Politics, Philosophy and Economics (PPE) at Hertford College, Oxford, in 1957, he returned to Lagos, Nigeria – where he had previously been conscripted to the Nigeria Regiment from 1953 to 1954 for his British national service – to become first Editor of Nigeria Magazine in 1959.

== Academic career ==
Crowder commenced his career as a secretary at the Institute of African Studies at the University of Ibadan. In 1964, he was Visiting Lecturer in African History at the University of California, Berkeley, and Director of the Institute of African Studies at Fourah Bay College, University of Sierra Leone in 1965.

While in Nigeria from 1968 to 1978, he was appointed as Research Professor and Director of the Institute of African Studies at the University of Ife (Now Obafemi Awolowo University). Afterwards, he became Professor of History at Ahmadu Bello University and finally was Research Professor in History at the Centre for Cultural Studies at the University of Lagos in the 1970s. After his return to London in 1979, he worked as an editor for the British magazine History Today. He was also Visiting Fellow at the Centre for International Studies at the London School of Economics (LSE), and Professor of History at the University of Botswana in the 1980s, while he worked as a Consultant Editor until his death.

He died in London on 14 August 1988, aged 54.

== Selected books ==
- The Story of Nigeria (1962)
- Senegal: A Study of French Assimilation Policy (1962; revised ed. 1967)
- Eze Goes to School, co-authored with Onuora Nzekwu (1963)
- West Africa Under Colonial Rule (1968)
- West African Resistance: The Military Response to Colonial Occupation (1971)
- Revolt in Bussa: A Study of British Native Administration in Nigerian Borgu, 1902-1935 (1973)
- West Africa: An Introduction to its History (1977)
- Akin Goes to School, co-authored with Christie Ade Ajayi (1978)
- Colonial West Africa: Collected Essays (1978)
- The Cambridge History of Africa, Volume 8: From c.1940 to c.1975 (1984), Cambridge University Press. ISBN 978-0-521-22409-3.

== See also ==
- John Fage, another early Africanist specialising in West Africa
- Anthony Kirk-Greene
- Ibadan School

== Bibliography ==
- J. F. Ade Ajayi; Michael Crowder (October 1990). History of West Africa. Columbia University Press. ISBN 978-0-231-03737-2.
- Michael Crowder; Guda Abdullahi (1979). Nigeria: An Introduction to Its History. Longman. ISBN 978-0-582-60346-2.
- J. F. Ade Ajayi (1992). People and empires in African history: essays in memory of Michael Crowder. Longman. ISBN 978-0-582-08997-6.
- Kalu Ogbaa (1 January 1999). Understanding Things Fall Apart: A Student Casebook to Issues, Sources, and Historical Documents. Greenwood Publishing Group. pp. 69–. ISBN 978-0-313-30294-7.
