= Eze Goes to School =

1963 novel by Nzekwu and Crowder

- Author: Onuora Nzekwu; Michael Crowder
- Illustrator: Adebayo Ajayi
- Language: English
- Series: African Writers Series
- Genre: Literary Fiction
- Set in: Nigeria
- Publisher: Heinemann Publishers
- Publication date: 1963
- Publication place: Nigeria
- Media type: Print (paperback)
- Pages: 79 pp (first edition)
- ISBN: 978-0602219352 (first edition)
- OCLC: 655015080
- Preceded by: High Life for Lizards
- Followed by: The Chima Dynasty in Onitsha

Eze Goes to School is a 1963 children novel co-written by Nigerian writer Onuora Nzekwu and British writer Michael Crowder. It was published in 1963 under the African Writers Series by Heinemann Publishers.

== Plot summary ==
Eze Goes To School centers mainly on Eze Adi, the protagonist of the novel who struggles to get formal education due to his poor family background. Eze finally makes a name for himself due to his intelligence. The novel exhibits the struggles of getting formal education in Nigeria in the twentieth century. These include truancy, cultism and poverty. Nzekwu and Crowder explain this albeit making it understandable for children.

== Reception ==
The novel gathered positive reviews. Daily Trust listed it as one of the books every child must read. It is regarded as one of the evergreen books that tells the Nigerian story. It is also among literature texts that influenced kids in the 90's by The Cable Lifestyle. Rudolf Ogoo Okonkwo writing for Sahara Reporters, noted that the novel is among the "...elements of the forces acting everywhere East of the Niger today."
