= Emenike Ejiogu =

Nigerian academic and administrator

- Born: Emenike Chinedozi Ejiogu; 6 April 1966 (age 60); Lagos
- Occupations: Engineer; Academic

Academic background
- Education: University of Nigeria, Nsukka; Nagoya University

Academic work
- Discipline: Electrical and Electronics Engineering
- Institutions: University of Nigeria; Ritsumeikan University; E-Tec Co. Ltd

Emenike Chinedozi Ejiogu is a Nigerian professor of electrical and electronics engineering from the University of Nigeria, Nsukka. He is the founder of the Laboratory of Industrial Electronics, Power Devices and New Energy System, the current dean of the Faculty of Engineering and also the director of the Africa Centre of Excellence For Sustainable Power and Energy Development of the institution.

== Early life and education ==
Emenike was born on 6 April 1966, in Lagos, Nigeria. He obtained his bachelor's and master's degrees in engineering in 1987 and 1990, respectively, from the University of Nigeria, Nsukka. In 1990, he obtained a diploma in Japanese language from Nagoya University, Japan. In 1994, he obtained his Ph.D. degree in Power Devices & Systems from Shinshu University, Nagano-city, Japan.

== Academic career ==
Emenike started his academic career as a part-time assistant lecturer at department of Electrical Engineering, University of Nigeria, Nsukka in 1980. In 1994, he became a lecturer at the Department of Electrical & Electronic Engineering, Ritsumeikan University, BKC, Kusatsu-city in Japan. He was promoted to assistant professor in 1997 and in 2001 he became an associate research fellow. In 2009, he became research professor at Mirai Denchi Laboratory, High Tech Research Centre, Ritsumeikan University, Kustatsu-shi, Shiga-ken in Japan and in 2011, he became a professor at the Department of Electrical Engineering, University of Nigeria, Nsukka at Enugu State.

== Administrative appointments ==
In 2001, Emenike was the chief research engineer at E-Tec Co. in Osaka. In 2005, he became the director of Research, Energy & Environmental Technology in Osaka. In 2007, he became the director-general at MicroSilitron Laboratory, Biwako Campus, Faculty of Science & Engineering of Ritsumeikan University, Kusatsu-city. In 2011, he became the director of Laboratory of Industrial Electronics, Power Devices & New Energy Systems of the Department of Electrical Engineering, at the University of Nigeria, Nsukka. Between 2013 and 2016 he was the head of the Department of the Department of Electrical Engineering of University of Nigeria, Nsukka.

== Scientific contributions ==
Emenike oversaw research under the guidance of the Laboratory of Industrial Electronics, Power Devices and New Energy Systems to build a gasification plant that produces synthetic gas from organic solid materials for use in electric power generation and other applications, generating 500KVA of electricity.

The Government of the Republic of Korea awarded three scientists (Okoye Kenneth Ejike, Emenike Ejiogu, and Matsui Sanchio) a patent in 2010 for their invention, which provides a fuel battery unit cell that can reduce in size and cost, as well as an array of fuel battery unit cells, a fuel battery module, and a fuel battery system.

Also, Okoye Kenneth Ejike, Emenike Ejiogu, and Matsui Sanchio were awarded a patent by the United States of America in 2013 for their invention that offers a fuel cell unit, fuel cell unit array, fuel cell module, and fuel cell system that can reduce size and prices.

== Membership and fellowship ==
In 1996, Emenike became a member of the New York Academy of Sciences. He was also nominated as a member of the Institute of Electrical and Electronics Engineers in 1992, a member of Japan Institute of Electrical Engineers in 1994 and a member of European Power Electronics Association. In 2011 he became a registered engineer at the Council for Regulation of Engineering in Nigeria, the president of Nigeria in Diaspora Organization, and a board member of the Nigerian Chamber of Commerce & Industry.

== Selected publications ==
- Kawabata, Y., Ejiogu, E., & Kawabata, T. (1999). Vector-controlled double-inverter-fed wound-rotor induction motor suitable for high-power drives. IEEE Transactions on Industry Applications, 35(5), 1058–1066.
- Kojima, M., Hirabayashi, K., Kawabata, Y., Ejiogu, E.. C. & Kawabata, T. (2002, October). Novel vector control system using deadbeat controlled PWM inverter with output LC filter. In Conference Record of the 2002 IEEE Industry Applications Conference. 37th IAS Annual Meeting (Cat. No. 02CH37344) (Vol. 3, pp. 2102–2109). IEEE.
- Fukuda, M., Kobayashi, K., Hirono, Y., Miyagawa, M., Ishida, T., Ejiogu, E. C., ... & Takeuchi, M. (2011). Jungle honey enhances immune function and antitumor activity. Evidence-Based Complementary and Alternative Medicine, 2011.
- Kawabata, T., Ejiogu, E. C., Kawabata, Y., & Nishiyama, K. (1997, July). New open-winding configurations for high-power inverters. In ISIE'97 Proceeding of the IEEE International Symposium on Industrial Electronics (Vol. 2, pp. 457–462). IEEE.
