= Okwu Joseph Nnanna =

Nigerian economist

Okwu Joseph Nnanna (born April 9, 1950 in Arochukwu, Abia State) is a Nigerian economist and central banker with professional experience. He has served in several positions at the Central Bank of Nigeria (CBN), including Deputy Governor of Economic Policy and Deputy Governor of Financial System Stability.

As Deputy Governor of Economic Policy, Nnanna was responsible for developing and implementing monetary and economic policies to maintain stable prices and support sustainable economic growth in Nigeria. He also addressed challenges, such as Nigeria's housing shortage, by emphasizing the role of housing finance and mortgage systems in the country's economic development. Nnanna has been affiliated with various financial institutions and has participated in seminars and discussions focused on improving Nigeria's economic and financial environment.

Throughout his career, Nnanna has been recognized for his commitment to enhancing Nigeria's financial stability and economic policy framework. His work continues to influence the country's economic strategies and policy decisions.
