= Paschal Eze =

Nigerian-American tourism marketing consultant

C. Paschal Eze
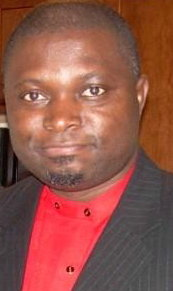
- Born: C. Paschal Eze; Isiekenesi, Ideato, Imo State, Nigeria
- Other name: C. Paschal Eze
- Education: Abia State University

C. Paschal Eze is a Nigerian American tourism marketing consultant. Born in Nigeria, Ezekiel worked as a journalist in The Gambia but currently serves as Vice President for Africa at the Hawaii USA-headquartered International Council of Tourism Partners (ICTP). Ezekiel has authored over a dozen books since 1998.

== Early life ==
C. Paschal Eze was born in the 1960s near Orlu in Imo State, located in the southeastern region of Nigeria, the eldest of seven children raised in Owerri (the capital city of Imo State). From 1985 to 1987, Eze studied Library Science at the Federal Polytechnic Nekede. In 1992, he graduated in Government and Public Administration from the Abia State University, Uturu in Abia State, southeastern Nigeria.

== Career ==
In 1996, Eze was ordained a minister of the gospel of the Lord Jesus Christ. Between 1996 and 2001, Eze served as a Gambia church pastor and held a variety of paid positions in education, tourism and news media. In 2001, Eze was a vice president of the Global Communication Research Association, headquartered at the Macquarie University in Sydney that supports media and communication researchers from geographically and epistemologically underrepresented areas. In February 2001, Eze founded the Gambia Media Network Against AIDS (MENAA), a coalition of Gambian print and electronic media journalists organized to combat AIDS. Eze also served as deputy editor-in-chief of The Daily Observer, a daily newspaper in The Gambia.

In late February 2001, Eze was made acting editor in chief of The Daily Observer. In June, The Independent reported that Eze was confronted by the management of the Daily Observer and told to not publish interviews or stories about United Democratic Party politician Lamin Waa Juwara. Three days later, Eze tendered his resignation as editor in chief along with ten other member of the editorial staff. In response to the mass resignation being considered "a major blow," Eze noted that he and the others resigned "because our credibility was at stake and, by so doing we want the world to know that we cannot compromise on the ethics of our profession." That same day, two more reporters resigned from their positions at the Observer.

From 2002, Eze was editor in chief of The Entrepreneur Magazine, a publication of the Gambia Chamber of Commerce and Industry. In May of that year, Eze chaired the Miss Gambia 2002 beauty pageant.

In 2003, Eze was re-ordained as a minister of the gospel of the Lord Jesus Christ seven years after his first ordination. In August 2003, having moved to London, his second book Playing Casino With God was published.

Two months later he moved to Coralville, Iowa. Owning and operating a Christian bookshop, he organized the Christian Book Fair International from 2004–2006. In November 2008, Eze was interviewed by the American Black Journal, where he provided an African perspective on what Barack Obama's victory meant to Africans and his views on the impact that Barack Obama would have on Africa as the US President.

== Publications ==
- Eze, Paschal (1998). Tourists and Dolphins of The Gambia: Friendship that lasts., (The book was fore worded by Susan Waffa-Ogoo, the present Gambian Permanent Representatives to the United Nations in New York.)
- Eze, Paschal (2003). Playing Casino with God. iUniverse. ISBN 0-595-28427-2.
- Eze, Paschal (2003). Help! My Success in Chains. Virtualbookworm Publishing. ISBN 1-58939-521-2.
- Eze, Paschal (2004). Against Four Big Foes: Depression, Disease, Debt, Drugs. Family Reading Ministries. ISBN 0-9760755-0-4.
- Eze, Paschal (2006). Black Jesus and the Capitalist Cross: Escape Their Ignited Greed, Ensure Your Ignored Need. ISBN 0-9760755-1-2.
- Eze, C. P. (2008). Don't Africa Me: "Their" geo-branding war, "Our" trade, tourism wounds, and Winning like China. Expertz in Print. ISBN 978-0-9800768-0-6., a book that critiques the media coverage of positive news coming out of Africa.
- Eze, C. Paschal (2009). Divorce Appetizers: All you shouldn't eat and what to do when you eat them. Expertz in Print. ISBN 978-0-9800768-7-5.
- Eze, C. Paschal (January 1, 2010). Prosperity Power Kit: Create and enjoy the good life you've always wanted. Expertz in Print. ISBN 978-0-9800768-8-2.
- Eze, C. Paschal (January 6, 2010). For Blacks (and others) Who Really Care: Smart ways to make your mark in Africa from afar. Expertz in Print. ISBN 978-0-9800768-9-9.
- Eze, C. Paschal (March 18, 2010). Prominence Power Kit: Dare to become a well known, highly admired and world changing VIP. Expertz in Print. ISBN 978-0-9844005-2-2.
- Eze, C. Paschal (October 14, 2010). Rebranding Race: Lessons from brand makeover winners, losers, pretenders and spectators. Global Mark Makers. ISBN 978-0-9844005-3-9.
