= Ifeanyi Chijindu =

American actor and artist (born 1978)

Ifeanyi also credited as Ifeanyi Chijindu // (born 19 October 1978) is a Nigerian-American author/writer, entrepreneur, artist, actress and screenwriter.

== Early life ==
Ifeanyi was born in Nigeria and is a first generation Nigerian-American. Ifeanyi spent most of her childhood living throughout various cities within southern California's Inland Empire.

== Career ==
Ifeanyi showed a childhood interest in literature when she had her first poem published at eight, completed a 90-page novella at eleven and at 15, Ifeanyi sold her first short story and won 2nd place for it in a contest hosted by Superior Communications and Publications.

By 17, Ifeanyi regularly performed her poetry at paid venues. Around this same time, Ifeanyi also deepened her interest in acting and won the part of Maya Angelou in a local play called Women In Love.

A Girl's Life...the Song that Never Ends, a themed poetry collection, was published in 2004 and centered on Chijindu's experiences about love, hatred, family, spirituality, racism, sexuality, individual and ethnic identity throughout her childhood, adolescence and early adulthood. Cal Poly Pomona presented her with the Golden Leaves Award in recognition for her literary achievement and for being the youngest person at the university to receive this award.

In 2005, Black Diaspora Magazine published "Healing from Within," Ifeanyi's feature article about Djehuty Maat-Ra, creator of DHERBS and celebrity herbalist who counts celebrities like R & B singer Brandy and actor Blair Underwood as part of his clientele.

Ifeanyi wrote for The Poly Post newspaper from 2005–2007 where she displayed her incisive writing style with her cultural profiles on artists like Nicaraguan painter Carlos Flores and in film reviews of movies such as Pirates of the Caribbean: At World's End, The Reaping and The Return.

In 2007, Ifeanyi's film critiques and social editorials allowed her to receive an award from the Society of Professional Journalists for "Best Editorial" for an article about how on-campus ethnic centers promote separatism and racism.

In addition to writing, painting, and acting throughout her adolescence and early adulthood, Ifeanyi worked as a freelance make up artist for aspiring actresses and models before creating Goddess Cosmetics, Accessories & Toiletries also known as Goddess C.A.T., an online shop featuring Goddess-inspired accessories along with herbal cosmetics and skin care.

Goddess C.A.T. became one of the few early companies who created healthy cosmetics for women of color before ethnic and herbal make up gained mainstream popularity with older cosmetic corporations.

Goddess C.A.T., Ifeanyi's beauty advice and social commentaries on issues relating to women's roles and beauty ideals have been featured in various newspapers, websites, women's and beauty magazines and blogs such as Glamour
