= Daniel Onyekachi =

Nigerian footballer

Personal information
- Date of birth: 23 August 1985 (age 41)
- Place of birth: Port Harcourt, Nigeria
- Height: 1.82 m (6 ft 0 in)
- Position: Striker

Senior career*
Years	Team	Apps	(Gls)
2002–2004	Kwara United F.C.		
2004–2005	GKS Katowice	5	(0)
2005	Zdrój Ciechocinek		
2005–2006	Górnik Wieliczka		
2006–2007	Kmita Zabierzów	14	(7)
2007–2008	Hetman Zamość	13	(5)
2008	GKS Katowice	6	(0)
2009	Ilanka Rzepin	10	(2)
2009–2010	Ślęza Wrocław	19	(6)
2010–2011	Elana Toruń	29	(7)
2011	Polonia Nowy Tomyśl	8	(4)
2011	LZS Piotrówka	14	(2)
2012	XM Fico Tây Ninh		
2015–2017	LZS Piotrówka		
2021	Płomień Dębe Wielkie	5	(0)
- * Club domestic league appearances and goals

Daniel OnyekachiLiaten (born 24 August 1985) is a Nigerian former professional footballer who played as a striker.

== Honours ==
LZS Piotrówka

- IV liga Opole: 2014–15
