= Mary Timms =

Nigerian model

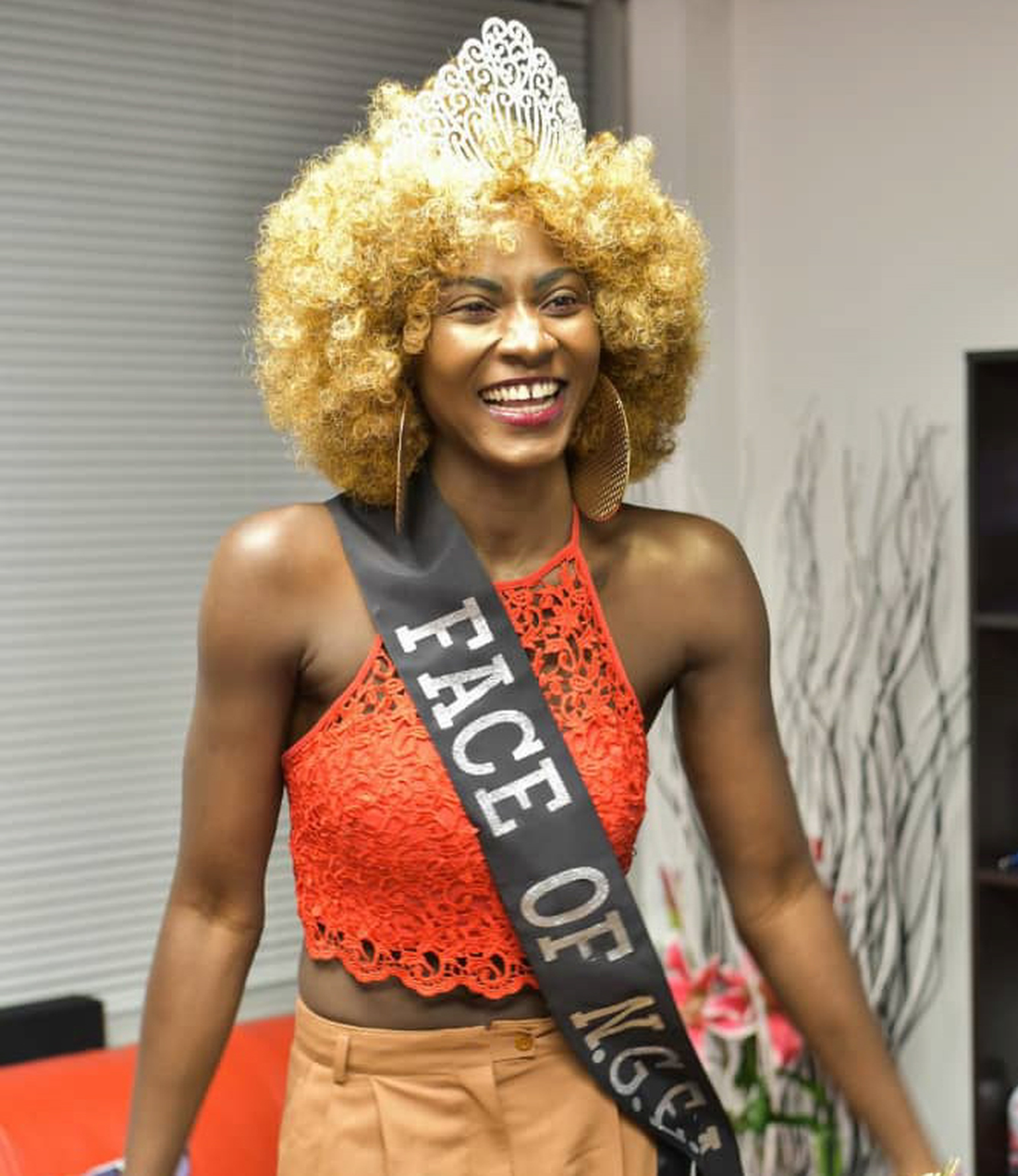
- Timms in 2017
- Height: 1.78 m (5 ft 10 in)
- Spouse: Edward Timms (m. 2016)
- Beauty pageant titleholder
- Title: Face of Next Generation Entertainment Awards 2017
- Hair color: Black
- Eye color: Brown
- Major competitions: Face of Next Generation Entertainment Awards 2017 (Winner)
- Website: marytimms.com

Mary Nkechi Timms is a Nigerian model and beauty pageant titleholder who was crowned Face of Next Generation Entertainment Awards 2017.

== Personal life ==
Timms is from Nnewi, Anambra State. She is based in the United States.

== Pageantry ==
=== Face of Next Generation Entertainment Awards 2017 ===
In 2017, Timms was crowned the winner of the 2017 edition of the Face of Next Generation Entertainment Awards 2017 that was held at Upper Marlboro, Maryland, United States.
