= Agnes Okoh =

Agnes Okoh // (May 1905 – March 10, 1995) was a Nigerian, an Igbo who became a Christian evangelist. She was the founder of Christ Holy Church International, an African Independent Church in Nigeria.

== Early life ==
Agnes Okoh was born in Ndoni in Rivers State, Nigeria in 1905, the only survivor of thirteen children born to Onumba Emordi, a farmer, and Ntonefu, a trader. She received little or no schooling and was illiterate; her parents were not Christian, but she would occasionally attend the Catholic church in Ndoni. After her parents had died, she moved to live with relatives in Asaba City in Delta State, where in 1924 she married James Okoh, a Ghanaian sailor. They had two children, Anyetei and Anyele, and her husband died in 1930. Then her daughter Anyele died in 1938, after which she suffered from severe migraines and depression. After conventional medicine and traditional remedies had failed, she consulted Ma Ozoemena, a prophetess who lived in Enugu, and after days of praying, recovered and ceased having migraines. She moved permanently to Enugu, studied under Ma Ozoemena and discovered she had spiritual gifts. While awaiting a call from God to serve him, she made a living from trading in textiles.

== Ministry ==
The call came in 1943 when she repeatedly heard a voice in her head saying "Matthew Ten". After some bewilderment, she discovered that this referred to the biblical instructions of Jesus in Saint Matthew's Gospel, chapter ten, telling his disciples to preach the gospel far and wide. By 1947, with encouragement from Ma Ozoemena, she felt ready to start evangelising, sold her profitable textile business and distributed her money to the poor. She started her public ministry in the marketplace in Onitsha, carrying a bell and a Bible, singing gospel songs, praying and exhorting people to renew their lives in Jesus. Many people came to listen, and some were healed of their ailments. She soon became widely known in Igboland and was invited to visit towns and villages in the surrounding area to evangelise. At each place, she sought the permission of the elders before starting singing, praying, preaching healing and prophesying. Periodically she would return to Onitsha where her mentor, Ma Ozoemena was based. Here she set up a prayer house headquarters in an unfinished building, and trained twelve people, ten men and two women, to join her in her ministry.

She endeavored to establish places of worship for her converts. Certain village elders permitted her to construct these buildings on sites known as "evil forests." This posed a trial for the new religious group, as it was believed that the spirits of the outcasts buried there would haunt them. Undeterred, she accepted the challenge, prayed fervently, and successfully erected church buildings without any harm coming to her or her converts. She encouraged the villagers to live in and farm these areas and was known as "Odozi Obodo" (nation builder) because of her ability to overcome the forces of the evil forests.

Her ministry flourished, but in 1965 she prophesied that Nigeria would soon be in turmoil, and during the Civil War (1966–1970) in eastern Nigeria, closed all the prayer houses and encouraged her converts to move to the more peaceful area of Arondizuogu. The war ended in 1970, things returned to normal, and the Christ Holy Church International, as it was now known, continued to expand.

== Legacy ==
Throughout her life, Okoh was known for her humility and acts of charity. She has had her enemies and critics and survived an attempt on her life. Some people resented her success as a female evangelist. She retired from the ministry in 1980 and returned to live in her birth town of Ndoni. Here she oversaw the building of a primary school and a nursery school, a maternity unit and a public water supply, and she organised the construction of new roads. She died in 1995 at the age of ninety. Her son predeceased her, but her grandson, Daniel Okoh, is the current overseer of the Christ Holy Church International, which currently employs fifteen hundred pastors, and has nearly two million members.
