= Zephrinus Chidubem Njoku =

Nigerian academic and professor

Professor Zephrinus Chidubem Njoku
- Born: May 1959 (age 67); Ahiazu-Mbaise
- Occupation: Academic

Academic background
- Education: University of Ibadan; University of Nigeria, Nsukka
- Thesis: Effects of Practical Work under Different Sex Groupings on Students' Skills Acquisition and Interest in Chemistry Practical Activities (1998)

Academic work
- Discipline: Educator
- Institutions: St. Jude's Primary (now, Central School), Amuzi; Community Secondary School, Amuzi; University of Ibadan, Ibadan; University of Nigeria, Nsukka

Zephrinus Chidubem Njoku is a professor of science education, an educator and former head of the Department of Science Education, University of Nigeria, Nsukka. He was resource person for UNESCO's Education for Sustainable Future Programme in 1999 and author or co-author of more than one hundred publications (including five books in science education).

== Early life and education ==
Zephrinus Njoku was born on May 15, 1959. He hails from Umuodu-Amuzi, Ahiazu-Mbaise, in Imo State. In 1973, he obtained his First School Leaving Certificate (FSLC) from St. Jude's Primary (now, Central School), Amuzi. He then attended Community Secondary School, Amuzi, and graduated with the West African School Certificate (WASC) in 1978. Njoku then gained admission into the University of Ibadan to study science education, majoring in chemistry and zoology. He obtained a Bachelor of Education (B.Ed.) (chemistry and zoology) in 1982.

== Career ==
From 1983 to 1988, he was employed as senior science master, (chemistry & integrated science), at Premier Secondary School, Ukehe. From 1989 until 1992, he was senior science master at Queen of the Rosary Secondary School, Nsukka. In 1990, he obtained a Master of Education (M.Ed.) degree in science education from the University of Nigeria, Nsukka. He was employed as lecturer in the Department of Chemistry, Federal College of Education, Eha-Amufu, and was appointed head of the Department of Chemistry from 1992 to 1994, and again from 1996 to 1998. Njoku was promoted to principal lecturer, Department of Chemistry, Federal College of Education, Eha Amufu, in 1996.

In 1998, he earned a Doctor of Philosophy degree (PhD) in science education (chemistry) from the University of Nigeria, Nsukka. His PhD thesis was entitled, "Effects of Practical Work under Different Sex Groupings on Students' Skills Acquisition and Interest in Chemistry Practical Activities".

He left as principal lecturer at the Department of Chemistry, Federal College of Education, Eha Amufu, Enugu State in 2000. That same year, he was employed in the University of Nigeria, Nsukka, as senior research fellow/lecturer. In 2006, he was promoted to professor of science education. Njoku was appointed head of the department in 2014 and he served until 2016. Njoku delivered the 182nd inaugural lecture of the University of Nigeria, Nsukka, on June 22, 2023. The lecture was entitled, "Abstractions and misconceptions: pedagogical approaches towards reducing students' learning difficulties in school chemistry".

== Specialization ==
Njoku is a research specialist in science & technology education; gender studies; gender issues in education and training. He is also a specialist in education sector strategic planning and operational planning. Njoku is a technology education consultant in basic education and science, and, in education, and educational interventions on HIV/AIDS control efforts. Njoku is also an expert in project planning and execution; an expert in project monitoring and evaluation; and a behavior change communicator.
