= Obi Onyeike =

Dutch footballer

Personal information
- Date of birth: 25 June 1992 (age 34)
- Place of birth: Zeist, Netherlands
- Height: 1.83 m (6 ft 0 in)
- Position: Defender

Team information
- Current team: VVSB
- Number: 3

Youth career
- –2009: Utrecht
- 2009–2012: Dordrecht

Senior career*
Years	Team	Apps	(Gls)
2012–2014	Dordrecht	4	(0)
2014	Hereford United	7	(1)
2015–2020	TEC	102	(4)
2020–	VVSB	6	(2)
- * Club domestic league appearances and goals as of 21 August 2021

Obi Onyeike (born 25 June 1992) is a Dutch professional footballer who plays for VVSB, as a defender.

== Early and personal life ==
Onyeike was born in Zeist, Netherlands; his father is Nigerian. His brother Chima was also a footballer; both brothers have played for FC Dordrecht.

== Career ==
Onyeike has played in the Eerste Divisie for Dordrecht since the 2012–13 season.
