= Richard Okonye =

Nigerian politician (1943–1999)

Chief Richard Uzochukwa Okonye (March 23, 1943 – 1999), the Esomeze I of Uteh Okpu, Delta State, Nigeria, was the Chief Security Officer to the late statesman and presidential aspirant of the Unity Party of Nigeria, Chief Obafemi Awolowo (1979–1983). After his exit from the political scene, he founded a security company called Foundation Security Services. He was a member of many political and indigenous organizations and contributed immensely to the politics of the South West during the 1999 elections.

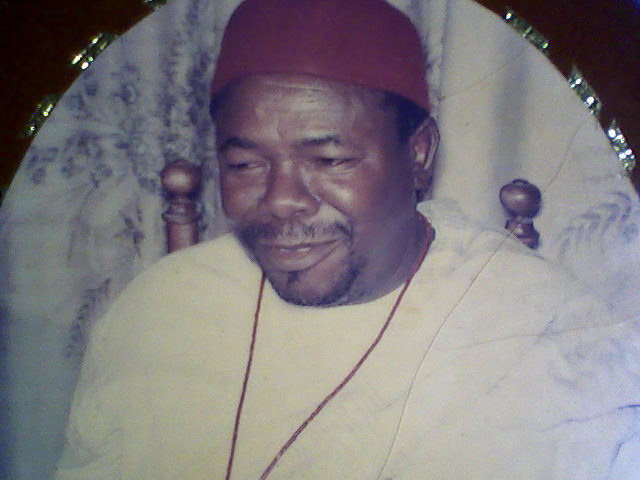
Chief Richard Okonye

== Early life ==
Born Richard Uzochukwa Okonye in the region now referred to as Delta state in Nigeria. His father, Nkwo Okonye was a wealthy land owner who acted as the counsel on legal matters in the regional colonial courts. He was also an active member of the Action Group political party. Nkwo was assassinated during the Nigerian civil war while he (Richard) was in his early teens. He soon decided not to be held down by circumstances, sold his dog and left his place of birth for Lagos with a strong determination to survive.

== Career ==
He enlisted in the Nigerian Army(1967) to fight for the unity of his country. He resigned from the military just after the civil war but later joined the Nigeria Police Force. He retired in 1979 to prepare for his next assignment which was to handle security details for Chief Obafemi Awolowo, the then presidential candidate for the Unity Party Of Nigeria. The 1983 coup which brought Major General Mohammed Buhari into power forced him and others out of the political scene. He set up a private security firm, and stayed away from politics until the 1999 elections. He couldn't participate fully because of health reasons so his activities were limited to the state level, where he played a very prominent role in securing the seat of the first Local Government Chairman of his constituency (Ifako Ijaiye L.G.A.) for his party candidate of the Alliance for Democracy party (A.D.), and several house of assembly seats won can be attributed to him.

== Awards and appointments ==
He was awarded several traditional chieftaincy titles which included, the hereditary position of ESOMEZE of Uteh Okpu Kingdom, Babalaje of Idi Agbon, Ekweme of Ejeme, Iyase Eze N'digbo (the traditional prime minister to the Eze N'digbo of Lagos). He was an elder of the Afenifere socio-political group, a prominent member of the Lagos faction of the Ohaneze chieftaincy consortium. He helped establish and was also a member of several clubs and organizations.

== Personal life ==
At the time of death, he was married to two wives (Matilda Umoru and Cordelia Mekunye) and had 9 children.
