= P. N. Okeke-Ojiudu =

Chief P.N. Okeke-Ojiudu KSS

Minister of Agriculture
- In office 1959–1966

Personal details
- Born: 1914 Alor, Eastern Nigeria
- Died: 1995 (aged 80–81) Enugu, Enugu State, Nigeria
- Party: National Council of Nigeria and the Cameroons
- Spouse: Grace N. Okeke
- Profession: Businessman, Teacher

Chief Patrick Nwokoye Okeke-Ojiudu KSS (1914–1995), also referred to as P.N. or P.N. Okeke, was a Nigerian politician, businessman, teacher, philanthropist and the patriarch of the Okeke-Ojiudu family. He was Minister of Agriculture from 1959–1966, a period known as the Nigerian First Republic.

== Early life ==
Born into a far from wealthy family from Alor, Anambra, Okeke-Ojiudu had to work hard in order to pay for his education at all levels. In 1938 he went to St. Charles Teachers Training College Onitsha, Anambra State where he studied from 1938–41. Due to his outstanding distinctions, he was posted direct as Headmaster. He was sent to St. Anthony's school Umudioka. There he served under father Michael Iwene Tansi (beatified by Pope John Paul II in 1998), and even at the time struck him as a Saint. Also at St. Anthony's, he was privileged to teach Francis Arinze (now Cardinal) who entered school at the age of ten. The two would go on to become good friends. In 1947, P.N. passed the Senior Teachers Certificate Examination and was posted to St. Charles T.T.C. as a tutor. He soon left his job as a tutor at St. Charles College to take up trading.

== Political career ==
After success trading in textiles and building materials, Okeke-Ojiudu ventured into politics in 1950 winning the Local Government election in his home town, and in 1951 became a member of the Onitsha Northern District Council where he was elected Chairman of the Staff and Education Committee. He would later serve as the Vice-Chairman of Onitsha Urban District Council.

In 1953 he was elected into the Eastern House of Assembly under the NCNC banner and in 1957 he was again elected member of the House with a massive vote of 67,000 second only to NCNC leader Nnamdi Azikiwe who polled 77,000 votes. While in office, Okeke-Ojiudu politically fought alongside Nigerian legend and founder of Africa's freedom movement, President Nnamdi Azikiwe as a parliamentarian.

In 1959 he became the first Minister of Agriculture (Eastern), in the first republic of Nigeria, a position which he held till 1966. Okeke-Ojiudu was the first Minister to join the then Premier Michael Okpara in his cabinet.

As minister he turned his attention to establishing Farm settlements throughout the region, which in turn led to an increase in food production. Next he turned to the problems of the African Continental Bank, the establishment of the Universal Insurance Company, re-organisation of the Eastern Nigeria Development Corporation (E.N.D.C.), and Nigerian Construction And Furniture Company (N.C.F.C.). Even NIGERCEM Nkalagu now a major revenue earner for Eastern states was to some extent under his supervision. He also assisted the regional government in securing a loan for the starting and running of the University of Nigeria Nsukka.

== Business ==
In the wake of the military takeover of January 1966, he retired into private life and gave full rein to his private enterprise. He is the founder of Peenok Investments, a real estate and investment company based in Nigeria.

Since then the Okeke-Ojiudu family has spawned a series of companies such as the Zodiac Hotels Group headed by son Chief E.A. Okeke-Ojiudu and P.M.C. (Peenok Medical Center) by son Ambassador Dr F.C. Okeke-Ojiudu (Nigeria's first Ambassador to the Vatican City), to name a few. The family also owns major property interests across West Africa and overseas.

== Honors ==
For his outstanding services and achievements, the Pope in 1975 bestowed the Knighthood of the Order of St. Sylvester (KSS) on him. He was also a Knight of St. Mulumba (KSM) of which he was one of the founding members.

== Personal life ==
P. N. Okeke was married to Grace Nwuduezue Adimorah. The couple had a daughter, Pamela, and five sons: Francis, Anthony, Chijioke, Ikenna and Chike.

He died at his home in Enugu, in 1995.
