= Ogbonna Oparaku =

Nigerian professor of electronic engineering

Oparaku Ogbonna Ukachukwu
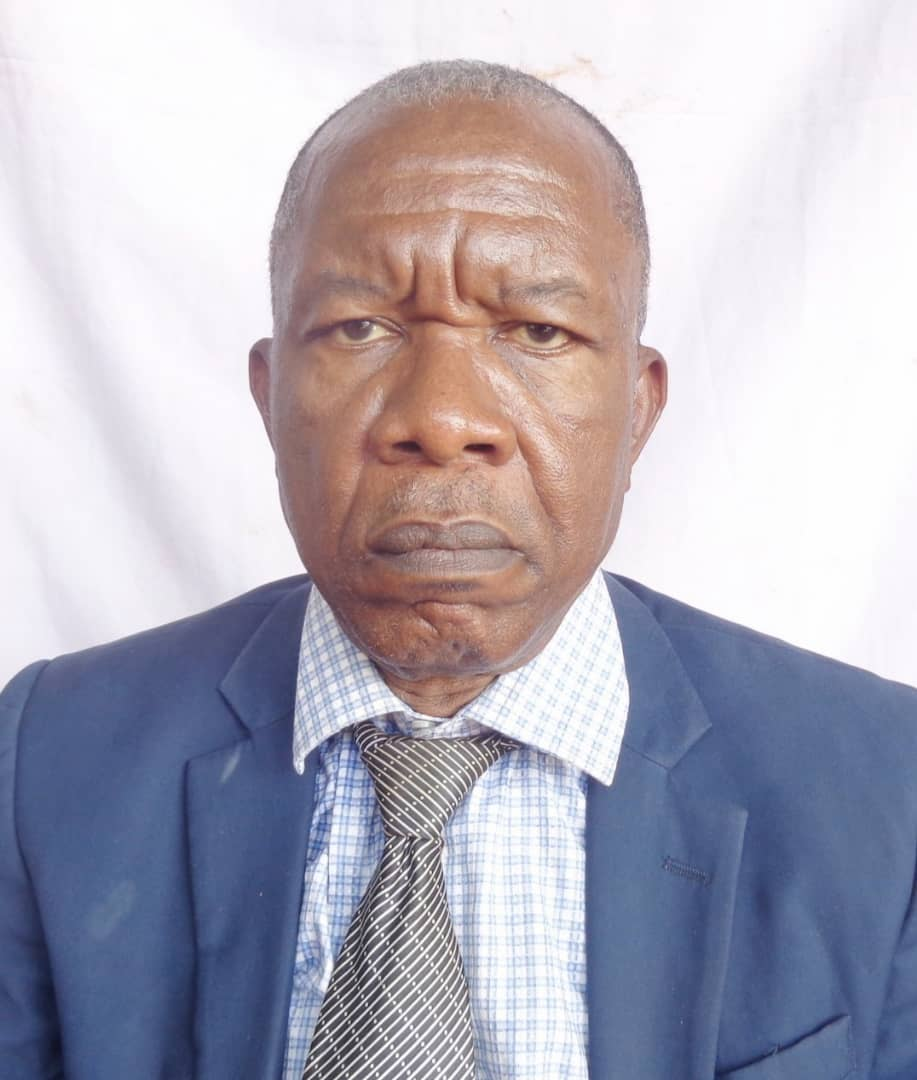
- Prof. Oparaku as Dean of the Faculty of Engineering, University of Nigeria, Nsukka
- Born: 6 September 1956 (age 70)
- Occupations: Scientist, Researcher, Academic.
- Awards: Global Journal Award The Nigerian Golden Jubilee Award By PSR Magazine

Academic background
- Education: University of Nigeria Nsukka, University of Northumbria
- Alma mater: University of Nigeria, Nsukka
- Thesis: Fabrication, Characterization and Stability Studies of InP/ITO Solar Cells (1988)

Academic work
- Discipline: Engineer
- Institutions: University of Nigeria, Nsukka

Oparaku Ogbonna Ukachukwu is a Nigerian professor of electronic engineering from the University of Nigeria, Nsukka. He is a former dean of faculty of Engineering and head of department of electrical and electronics engineering. He is a member of the Nigerian Society of Engineers (NSE) and Institute of Electrical and Electronics Engineers (IEEE).

== Education ==
Ogbonna obtained his West African School Certificate from Government Secondary School Afikpo in 1975. He got admission into the University of Nigeria Nsukka in the same year and graduated in 1980. He was a beneficiary of British Council Scholarship in 1985 and he used it to further his doctorate degree. In 1988, he obtained his PhD in Solid State Electronics and focus on the “Fabrication, Characterization and Stability Studies of InP/ITO Solar Cells from University of Northumbria at Newcastle.

== Career ==
Ogbonna started his career after his NYSC as a Maintenance Engineer as General Electric Company (Telecommunications) at Apapa. In 1983, he was employed by University of Nigeria Nsukka as a graduate assistant where he worked at the department of Electronic Engineering and the National Centre for Energy Research and Development till he was appointed a professor in 2003.

== Administrative appointments ==
Ogbonna was appointed as the Director of the National Centre for Energy Research and Development from 2004 to 2009. In 2011, he was appointed the Head of Department of Electronic Engineering.

== Membership and fellowship ==
Ogbonna is a member of Nigerian Society of Engineer, Institution of Electrical and Electronic Engineers (IEEE), Solar Energy Society of Nigeria. He is a fellow of International Solar Energy Society, the Council for the Regulation of Engineering in Nigeria (COREN) and Nigerian Meteorological Society

== Selected publications ==
- Udanor, Collins N.; Oparaku, Ogbonna U. (2016). "A Performance Evaluation of a Multi-Agent Mobile Learning System". International Journal of Interactive Mobile Technologies. 10 (2): 10. doi:10.3991/ijim.v10i2.4873.
