= Nwamaka Okoye =

Nigerian designer and social entrepreneur

Nwamaka Nwobi Okoye
- Born: Lagos, Nigeria
- Education: University of Nigeria BA in Architecture; East Tennessee State University MA in Engineering
- Occupations: Interior architect, writer and social entrepreneur
- Organization: Stanford Seed Transformation Program Nigeria
- Known for: Founder of Housessories Ltd; Gearshift Africa
- Spouse: Anthony Okoye
- Children: 3
- Website: www.nwamakaokoye.com

Nwamaka Nwobi Okoye// is a Nigerian interior architect, author, and social entrepreneur. She is known for her work in design, entrepreneurship, and advocacy for ethical leadership in encouraging members of the African diaspora to return to contribute to the continent.

== Early life and education ==
Okoye was born in the Iwaya neighborhood of Lagos, Nigeria, one of five children born to parents from Anambra State. Both of her parents were entrepreneurs. Her father owned an interior design business, which would later inspire her future career. At age sixteen, she began studying architecture at the University of Nigeria.

After earning her Bachelor's degree in architecture, she moved to the United States to study interior design, as no university in Nigeria had courses in the subject at the time. Okoye pursued graduate studies in Interior Design at the Savannah College of Art and Design and earned a master's degree in Engineering Technology, specializing in Illustration and Multimedia from East Tennessee State University.

== Career ==
In 2007, Okoye returned to Nigeria with the intention of investing in the country. After living abroad, she considered it her duty to contribute back to the country of her birth. Okoye founded Housessories Ltd, a design and furniture manufacturing company. The company has since collaborated with organizations such as Fidelity Bank, Unilever, Mitsubishi Motors, and the Nigerian Sovereign Investment Authority. Her design work often incorporates elements of sustainability and biophilic design using recycled materials. In 2018, Housessories Ltd, was named one of Nigeria's fastest-growing companies by Business Day.

=== Social entrepreneurship ===
In addition to her work in design, Okoye co-founded Value Driven Leadership, an initiative to promote business ethics and governance. Okoye is an alumna and past president of the Stanford Seed Transformation Program Nigeria, a business leadership initiative by the Stanford University Graduate School of Business. The network provides training and support for entrepreneurs in Nigeria, with programs such as the Start-Up Impact Training for Entrepreneurs. For her work to support entrepreneurship in Nigeria, Okoye has been recognized with the Woman of Merit Gold Award by People and Power and named one of the Top 100 Women SME Entrepreneurs in Nigeria by Bank and Entrepreneur Africa Magazine. She also writes a regular column for Business Day Newspaper, discussing topics related to ethical leadership and sustainable business.

In 2024, Okoye published Navigating the Return: A Guide for Aspiring African Entrepreneurs in the Diaspora – The Nigerian Case ISBN 979-8326720283, offering practical advice for Africans in the diaspora considering returning to Nigeria to start businesses.

=== Nwamaka Okoye Literature Prize ===
Okoye is the founder of Gearshift Africa, an organization supporting African storytellers and content creators. In 2024, Gearshift Africa established the Nwamaka Okoye Literature Prize, a competition for unpublished African writers. The inaugural theme, Coming of Age, received nearly 400 entries, with shortlisted works published in an anthology of the same name.
