= Uche Nduka =

Nigerian-American poet (born 1963)

- Born: Williams Uche Nduka; October 14, 1963 (age 62)
- Occupations: Poet, writer, lecturer

Uche Nduka (born October 14, 1963) is a Nigerian-American poet, writer, lecturer and songwriter who was awarded the Association of Nigerian Authors Prize for Poetry in 1997. He lives in New York City.

== Life ==
Uche Nduka was born in Nigeria to a Christian family. His birth name was Williams Uche Nduka, the "Africanization" of his name occurred after Dr. Juliet Okonkwo's particularly moving treatise on African "cultural nationalism". Raised bilingual in Igbo and English, he earned his BA from the University of Nigeria, Nsukka (in Enugu State, southeastern part of Nigeria) and his MFA from Long Island University, Brooklyn.

He left Nigeria in 1994 and settled in Germany after winning a fellowship from the Goethe Institute. He lived in Germany and the Netherlands for the next decade and immigrated to the United States in 2007.

Nduka's work is notable for its surrealist energy and political urgency. According to Joyelle McSweeney: "To my reading, all of Nduka's work is Surreal, and in this sense, it is all political. The real is not paraphrased or commented on by Surrealism but convulses through it. The real in Nduka's work carries the resonance not only of his Nigerian identity and experience of political violence but also the dislocation of the émigré and the frightening power relations of intimacy as mapped onto the lyric." Nduka himself has said: "So far I just like doing my own thing and not buying into the hype of either formal or informal English; traditional or avant-garde usages. I enact a language style that suits my mood and the subjects I am interested in. Linguistically it seems there are a lot of trenches that have not been explored in poems/poetry. I keep attempting to investigate them. I don't want to feel like people expect me to write in English timidly." Nduka currently lives in Brooklyn. He is a member of *Kristiania, a Brooklyn-based literary collective.

== Career ==
Nduka is the author of numerous collections of poetry and prose, including Nine East (2013), Ijele (2012), and eel on reef (2007), all of which were published after he arrived in the United States. Earlier collections include Heart's Field (2005); If Only the Night (2002); Chiaroscuro (1997), which won the Association of Nigerian Authors Poetry Prize; The Bremen Poems (1995); Second Act (1994); and Flower Child (1988). Belltime Letters (2000) is a collection of prose.

== Bibliography ==
=== Poetry collections ===
- Flower Child (Update Communications, 1988)
- Second Act (1994)
- The Bremen Poems (New Leaf Press, 1995)
- Chiaroscuro (Yeti Press, 1997)
- Belltime Letters (New Leaf Press, 2000)
- Heart's Field (Yeti Press, 2005)
- eel on reef (Akashic Books, 2007)
- Tracers (Wheelhouse Press, 2010) *
- Ijele (Overpass Books, 2012)
- Nine East (SPM Publications, 2013)
- Facing You (City Lights Publishers, 2020)

=== Poetry anthologies edited ===
- Poets in Their Youth (Lagos: Osiris, 1988)
- Und Auf den Strassen Eine Pest (Bad Unkel: Horleman Verlag, 1996)
