= Sonny Chidebelu =

Nigerian Professor of Agricultural Economics

Prof. Sonny Chidebelu
- Born: Sonny Angus Nnaemeka Dixie Chidebelu
- Occupations: Researcher, Academic

Academic background
- Education: University of Nigeria, Nsukka, (BSc); University of Guelph, (MSc); University of Georgia (PhD)

Academic work
- Discipline: Agricultural Economics
- Institutions: University of Nigeria, Nsukka

Sonny Angus Nnaemeka Dixie Chidebelu is a Nigerian professor of Agricultural economics (Agribusiness) from the Faculty of Agriculture, University of Nigeria, Nsukka. He is a two times head of Department of Agriculture and a member of the Nigerian Academy of Science.

== Early life and education ==
Sonny was born on February 15, 1948, at Abagana in Anambra State, Nigeria. He obtained his West African School Certificate (WAEC) in 1965 from King's College, Lagos Nigeria. He obtained his first degree in Agricultural Economics and Extension from University of Nigeria, Nsukka in 1973 . He received his Master's degree in Agribusiness/ Agricultural Economics from the University of Guelph, Guelph, Ontario, Canada in 1977. In 1980, he obtained his PhD in Agricultural Economics from University of Georgia, Athens, Georgia, U.S.A.

== Career ==
Sonny began his academic career in 1977 as a Graduate Research Assistant at the department of Agric economics, University of Georgia. he became research associate in 1980, Lecturer II in 1981, Lecturer I in 1983, Senior Lecturer in 1985, a professor in 1996 and a visiting professor to Delta State University in 2001.

== Membership and fellowship ==
Sonny is a member of Nigerian Association of Agricultural Economists (NAAE) and Agricultural Society of Nigeria (ASN). He is a fellow of Farm Management Association of Nigeria (FAMAN) and African Institute for Applied Economics (AIAE).

== Selected publications ==
- Nwosu, C. S., & Chidebelu, S. A. N. D. (2014). Resource Productivity under Yam Based crop Mixture in crude and non-crude oil Producing communities of Imo State, Nigeria. Agricultura tropica et subtropica, 47(1), 20–28.
- Ani, D. P., Chidebelu, S. A. N., & Enete, A. A. Spatial Price Differential: An Analysis of Soyabeans Marketing in Benue and Enugu States, Nigeria.
- Ogbanje, E. C., Chidebelu, S., & Nweze, N. J. (2015). Off-Farm Income's Share and Farm Investment among Small-Scale Farmers in North-Central Nigeria: The Heckman's Selection Model Approach. Global Journal of Human Social Science, 15(3), 1–7.
