= Azuka Okwuosa =

Nigerian politician

Hon Azuka Okwuosa
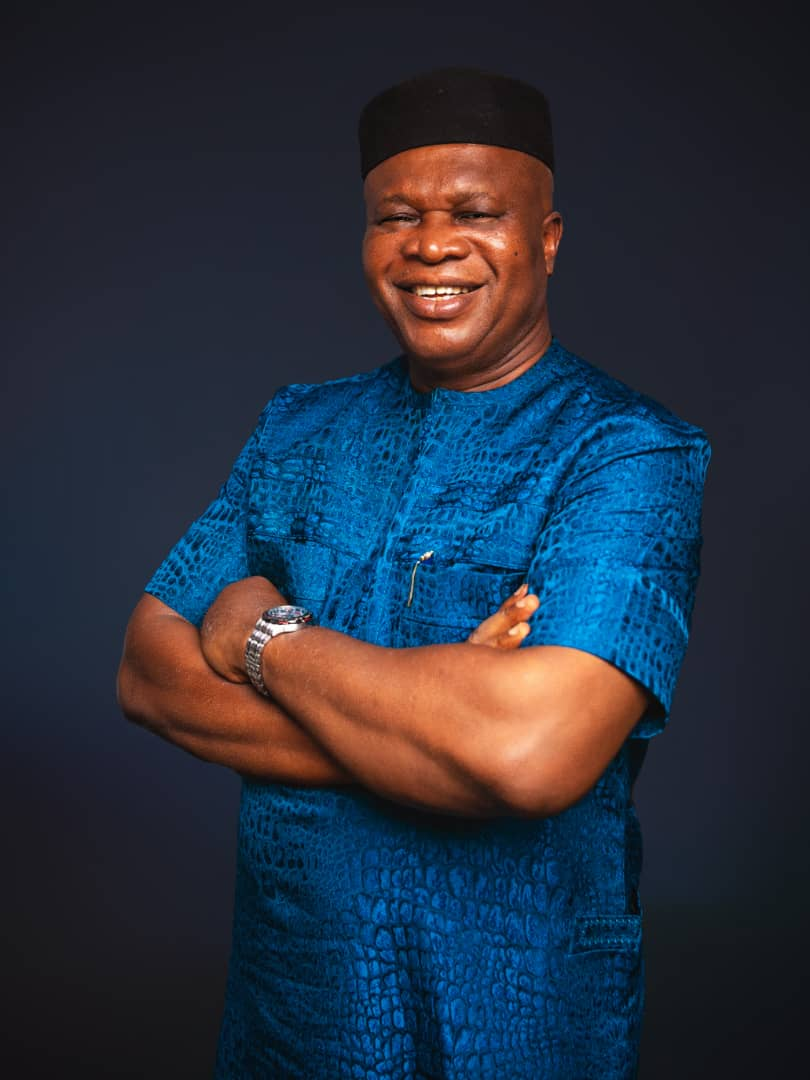

Anambra State Commissioner for Works and Transport
- In office 1999–2001
- Governor: Chinwoke Mbadinuju

Personal details
- Born: 3 November 1959 (age 66)
- Party: All Progressives Congress
- Other political affiliations: People's Democratic Party (1999–2003); All Progressives Grand Alliance; Action Congress of Nigeria
- Occupation: Politician
- Nickname: Chinyelugo 1 of Oraifite

Azuka Okwuosa // (born 3 November 1959), is a Nigerian politician and engineer who served as the Anambra State Commissioner for Works and Transport from 1999 to 2001. He was a governorship aspirant in the 2021 Anambra State gubernatorial election representing All Progressives Congress.

== Early life and education ==
Okwuosa was born in Jos, Plateau State, Nigeria. He started his education at All Saints Primary School, Irefi, Oraifite, Anambra State, where he received his First School Leaving Certificate, FSLC in 1973. He went on to Colliery Comprehensive Secondary School, Ngwo, Enugu State, Nigeria, where he received his West African Senior School Certificate Examination and General Certificate of Education in 1977. He furthered to Institute of Management Technology, Enugu, where he received an OND in fine and applied arts in 1981. In 1983, he received an HND in graphics arts/advertising. He graduated from Samuel Bible Institute, Lagos State with a diploma in theology in 1998. He did his mandatory National Youth Service Corps at Tide Newspaper, Port Harcourt, Rivers State, Nigeria from 1983 to 1984.

== Career ==
Okwuosa became an industrial attaché in Government Press, Enugu, immediately after his OND, from 1981 to 1982. During that time, he founded a company, Nimex Leads Limited, Enugu.

== Political career ==
Okwuosa was mentored by C. Odumegwu Ojukwu, whom he worked for, from 1984 to 1994. He started his political career, serving as the chairman of Nnewi local government council (now, Ekwusigo and Nnewi North local government areas) from 1994 to 1996. In 1999, the then governor of Anambra State, Chinwoke Mbadinuju appointed him as the Commissioner for Works and Transport and he served till 2001. From 2002 to 2010, he was the secretary-general of the South-East Development Initiative. In 2007, during the 2007 Nigeria general elections, he contested as a senatorial candidate of the All Progressives Grand Alliance for Anambra South Senatorial zone which he lost. He challenged his loss at the election petitions tribunal for two years, and then to the court of appeal, Enugu State, where he won the case. The election was nullified and a by-election was conducted in 2009, where he lost. He was a member of the People's Democratic Party from 1999 to 2003, a former member of the All Progressives Grand Alliance and the Action Congress of Nigeria. He is currently a member of the ruling All Progressives Congress.

== Personal life ==
Okwuosa is from Umunzalu kindred, Umueshi Irefi, Oraifite, Ekwusigo, Anambra State, Nigeria. He is a knight of the Anglican Church. His father was an ex-serviceman, while his mother was a teacher.
