= Patrick Obi Ngoddy =

Professor at the University of Nigeria

- Born: June 1940 (age 86)
- Occupations: Researcher, Academic; Engineer

Academic background
- Education: California Polytechnic State University, San Luis Obispo, Michigan State University

Academic work
- Discipline: Food Engineering and Processing
- Institutions: Michigan State University, Obafemi Awolowo University, University of Nigeria, Nsukka

Patrick Obi Ngoddy is a Nigerian professor of Food Engineering and Processing at the Faculty of Agriculture University of Nigeria, Nsukka. He is the pioneer head of department of Food Science and Technology, a former dean of faculty of Agriculture and a member of the Nigeria Academy of Science

== Early life and education ==
Patrick Obi Ngoddy was born on June 24, 1940. He earned his first degree in Agricultural Engineering from California Polytechnic State University, San Luis Obispo in 1965. In 1967 and 1969, he obtained his M.Sc. and Ph.D. in Agricultural Process and Food Engineering from Michigan State University, East Lansing, Michigan respectively.

== Career ==
Ngoddy began his professional career at Michigan State University as an instructor in Agricultural Engineering in 1968. In 1968, he became an assistant professor in Food and Agricultural Engineering and Director of the Agricultural Pollution Control Laboratory in 1969.

In 1971, he returned to Nigeria (Obafemi Awolowo University, Ile-Ife) where he rose to a professor in Food Engineering and Processing in 1978. He served as Professor of Food Engineering and Processing, University of Nigeria, Nsukka, where he held several positions such as Department of Food Science and Technology from 1979 to 1982, Dean of Faculty of Agriculture from 1981 to 1983, Deputy Vice-Chancellor from 1985 to 1986, Dean of School of Post-Graduate Student from 1985 to 1987 and Deputy Vice- Chancellor, Academic Affairs from 1995 to 1998

== Membership and fellowship ==
In 1965, he became a Fellow of the American Society of Agricultural Engineers, Fellow Institute of Food Technology (IFT, USA) in 1969, member of American Society for Heating, Refrigeration and Air-Conditioning Engineering (ASHRAE) in 1970, and a Fellow of the Nigerian Academy of Science

== Selected publications ==
- Ihekoronye, A. I., & Ngoddy, P. O. (1985). Integrated food science and technology for the tropics.
- Uvere, P. O., Onyekwere, E. U., & Ngoddy, P. O. (2010). Production of maize–bambara groundnut complementary foods fortified pre‐fermentation with processed foods rich in calcium, iron, zinc and provitamin A.
- Uzochukwu, S. V., Balogh, E., Tucknot, O. G., Lewis, M. J., & Ngoddy, P. O. (1994). Volatile constituents of palm wine and palm sap.
- Uvere, P. O., Ngoddy, P. O., & Nnanyelugo, D. O. (2002). Effect of amylase-rich flour (ARF) treatment on the viscosity of fermented complementary foods.
- Ngoddy, P. O. (1972). Closed system waste management for livestock. US Environmental Protection Agency.
- Uvere, P. O., Ngoddy, P. O., & Nwankwo, C. S. (2014). Hardness as a modification index for malting red and white sorghum (kaffir) grains.
