= Prince B.B Apugo =

Board of Trustee Member, APC

Member, National Board of Trustees

Personal details
- Born: 5 November 1951 (age 74) Abia State, Nigeria
- Citizenship: Nigerian
- Party: All Progressive Congress

Benjamin Benedict Apugo (born 5 November 1951) is a Nigerian politician, philanthropist and entrepreneur in the oil field, he is a founding father of the People's Democratic Party (PDP) in 1998 and a current Board of Trustees Member of the All Progressive Congress (APC) party. He is from Ibeku in Abia State, Nigeria. In 2007, Apugo contested for the National Chairman under PDP, his then political party. In 2020, he emerged winner of Business Hallmark's Outstanding Political Leadership Award for the year 2020.

== Early life and education ==
Apugo was born to the family of late Prince Joseph Apugo Ihejirika and Princess Harriet Apkanu Apugo of Umuakaka ruling house, Nkata in Umuahia Ibeku, Abia State Nigeria, A traditionalist who was recently honoured by the Abia State Council for Arts and Culture and has the title "Ochiaga of Ibeku" or "Oparaukwu Ibeku". In 1979, he contested for the then Imo State Deputy Chairmanship of the National Party of Nigeria (NPN) and won the election. B.B, as he is popularly known, joined the National Republican Convention (NRC) party and became a member of the National Executive Council of the Party.

Prince Apugo attended St. Mary's Catholic School in Ibeku, St Michael's School Idima, Abam and Xaview College Etiti-Ulo, Bende for his primary and secondary education.

== Career ==
Apugo joined the National Party of Nigeria (NPN) when he was 26 years old, he was an ally of the late former President of Nigeria, Shehu Shagari, and the late Adamu Ciroma, invigorating his career. In 2007, he contested for National Chairman of the People's Democratic Party.

In 2023, he endorsed the current Abia State ruling party, Labor Party, (LP) and current Governor, Dr. Alex Otti, without party-bias, despite being a member of the APC .

In former times, Apugo has also endorsed prominent figures in the history of Nigerian politics.
