= Ejikeme Patrick Nwosu =

Nigerian inventor

- Born: 4 February 1983 (age 43); Awka, Anambra, Nigeria
- Education: Nnamdi Azikiwe University (BS) University of Ibadan (MSc)

Ejikeme Patrick Nwosu (born 4 February 1983) is a Nigerian inventor and scientist. He filed patents in Nigeria, including for converting urine into flammable gases and the Ezeugo Flask, and also for producing hydrogen from a reactor. In a speech given by the former Vice President of the Federal Republic of Nigeria, Yemi Osinbajo, on behalf of the former President, Muhammadu Buhari, Nwosu was mentioned alongside five other inventors in Nigeria. He was noted as the "Anambra Person of the Week".

== Early life and education ==
Ejikeme Nwosu was born on 4 February 1983 in Awka, Anambra State, Nigeria. He earned a bachelor's degree in pure and industrial chemistry from Nnamdi Azikiwe University. He also has a master's degree in organic chemistry from the University of Ibadan.

== Inventions ==
Nwosu was granted Nigerian patents for devices including a fire-retardant paint and a separation apparatus for purifying mixtures of miscible solutes, solvents and colloid by-products. He also received a patent for a process of producing flammable gases from human urine, using what he called a patrium flask reactor.

In 2021, the Federal Government of Nigeria announced that it had partnered with Ejikeme’s company, Lumos Laboratories Nigeria Limited to establish a waste management system in which biogas will be produced from biodegradable wastes and urine for the purpose of generating electricity and cooking gas in correctional centers across the country. In 2022, Hydrofuel Canada Inc. entered into a share purchase agreement with Lumos Laboratories to produce green hydrogen, ammonia, fertiliser, and electricity, all from human and animal wastes. Nwosu also invented urine-based fertiliser. In order to create the urine-based fertiliser, he first created a prototype urine-diverting toilet that collected urine from human users. On 23 November 2022, the Federal Government of Nigeria awarded him another patent for this invention. Nwosu envisaged a future in which people would be paid for passing urine in conveniences because of the use of the urine for producing the fertiliser which he had invented.
