= Ugonna Umerou =

Nigerian designer and actress

- Occupation: Actress

Ugonna Umerou is a Nigerian designer and actress. She owns the House of Nwaocha feminine clothing line.
