= Zacheus Chukwukaelo Obi =

Zacheus Chukwukaelo Obi, (1896–1993) Eze-onunekwulu-Igbo, (spokesman for the Igbo) was an Igbo leader who was born in Nnewi; he was educated at the C.M.S. school, Nnewi. He started work as a pupil teacher but later entered the commercial sector, joining the United African Company. He rose to become a produce manager for the Eastern region of the country in 1948, and became the first African to hold the position from the region in the company. He was one of the earliest Igbo indigenes who wanted a platform to unite Igbo's in order to protect their interest with the coming of independence and was a founding member of the Igbo State Union. In 1951, Raymond Njoku, the president of the Union was made minister for transport, leaving open the leadership of the Igbo State Union. Zacheus Obi soon became the President of the union in 1951 and lasted until 1966, when a military regime banned political organizations.
