= Chima Onyeike =

Dutch footballer and coach

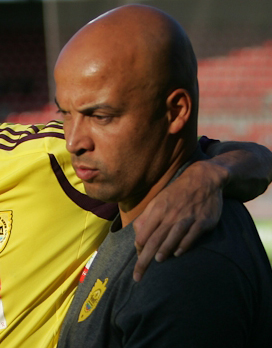

Personal information
- Full name: Chima Michail Onyeike
- Date of birth: 21 June 1975 (age 51)
- Place of birth: Zeist, Netherlands
- Position: Striker

Youth career
- DEV
- WGW
- HRC

Senior career*
Years	Team	Apps	(Gls)
1995–1998	HFC Haarlem	69	(11)
1998–2000	Dordrecht	60	(26)
2000–2002	Excelsior	30	(1)
2000–2001	→ VVV-Venlo (loan)	24	(6)
2002–2003	TOP Oss	34	(10)
2003–2004	Dordrecht	31	(9)
2004–2005	Cambuur	9	(2)
- Quick Boys
Total		257	(65)
- * Club domestic league appearances and goals

Chima Michail Onyeike (born 21 June 1975) is a Dutch football coach and former professional player.

== Early and personal life ==
Onyeike was born in Zeist, Netherlands; his father is Nigerian. His brother Obi is also a footballer; both brothers have played for FC Dordrecht.

== Career ==
=== Playing career ===
Born in Zeist, Onyeike played for DEV, WGW, HRC, HFC Haarlem, Dordrecht, Excelsior, VVV-Venlo, TOP Oss, Cambuur and Quick Boys. After leaving Dordrecht in the summer of 2004, he went on trial with Volendam in September 2004. He then signed for Cambuur in October 2004.

=== Coaching career ===
After retiring from playing, Onyeike attended a sport's university to obtain his diploma in fitness. He then began work as a personal training, working with players such as Roy Makaay and Aleksandr Kerzhakov.

In July 2011, he became the fitness coach at Russian club Anzhi Makhachkala.

In June 2013, he became the fitness coach at Greek club PAOK. On 25 November 2014 he started to work as fitness coach for VfB Stuttgart.
