= Onuora Nzekwu =

Nigerian academic and writer (1928–2017)

Professor Onuora Nzekwu OON
- Born: Joseph Onuorah Nzekwu; Kafanchan, Kaduna State, Nigeria
- Died: 21 April 2017 (aged 89); Onitsha, Anambra State, Nigeria
- Occupation: Writer
- Years active: 1956–1985
- Known for: Former General manager News Agency of Nigeria
- Notable work: Wand of Noble Wood (1961)
- Awards: Fellow of the Rockefeller Foundation

Onuora Nzekwu (OON) also known as Joseph Onuora Nzekwu (19 February 1928 – 21 April 2017) was a Nigerian professor, writer and editor from the Igbo people. He is author of the 1961 novel Wand of Noble Wood and the 1963 novel Eze Goes to School, which was among the African Writers Series.

== Biography ==
Nzekwu was born in Kafanchan, Kaduna State in the north-western part of Nigeria, to Mr. Obiese Nzekwu and Mrs. Mary Ogugua Nzekwu (née Aghadiuno) of Onitsha, a city in Anambra State in the southeastern region of Nigeria. In January 1956, Nzekwu joined the Federal Civil Service and worked as an editorial assistant at the Nigeria Magazine division of the Federal Ministry of Information and Communications, from 1956 to 1958. In 1958, he took over the position of editor-in-chief of the magazine. Nzekwu continued to run the Nigeria Magazine division of the Federal Ministry of Information and Communications until 1966, when the Nigerian crisis compelled him to transfer his services to the Eastern Nigeria Public Service.

He began as a senior information officer at Eastern Nigeria, a post that combined the roles of Information Ministry and Cultural officer. In 1968, he was promoted deputy director of the newly created Cultural Division. At the end of hostilities in January 1970, Nzekwu returned to the Federal Ministry of Information in May and was assigned to the information division as senior information officer.

Nzekwu worked as general manager of News Agency of Nigeria (NAN) until 1 July 1979, when he then took over the position of substantive general manager. He retired from the Nigeria Public Service in 1985, after presiding over the affairs of NAN for nearly eight years and serving his country’s government for 39 years.

== Awards ==
Onuora Nzekwu received the Rockefeller Foundation Fellowship in 1961, which enabled him to study American Methods of Magazine Production with Crafts Horizons in New York. In 1964, he was awarded a UNESCO Fellowship, which allowed him to study copyright administration for three months in Geneva, Prague, Paris, London, New York and Washington.

On 8 August 2006, News Agency of Nigeria observed its 30th anniversary during celebrations at Abuja, the federal capital territory of Nigeria. The NAN presented a plaque, with the engraving "Maker of NAN", to Nzekwu. In December 2008, Nzekwu was conferred with the Nigerian national honour of Officer of the Order of the Niger (OON).

== Publications ==
Nzekwu has also authored several novels. He co-authored Eze Goes to School and Eze Goes to College with historian Michael Crowder. The two school supplementary readers were first published by African University Press in 1964 and 1988 respectively.

In 1977, Nzekwu published his first non-fiction work, The Chima Dynasty in Onitsha, in which he presented the history of Onitsha through an account of the reign of its monarchs. Nzekwu's novel, Faith of Our Fathers, a compendium of the arts, beliefs, social institutions and code of values that characterize the Onitsha traditional community, was published in 2003.

== Personal life ==
Nzekwu married Onoenyi Justina Ogbenyeanu, daughter of Chief Isaac Aniegboka Mbanefo, Odu II of Onitsha, in June 1960 and was inducted into the ancient and prestigious Agbalanze Society of Onitsha in May 1991. He died on 21 April 2017.

== Works ==
- Wand of Noble Wood (1961)
- Blade Among the Boys (1962)
- Highlife for Lizards (1965)
- Eze Goes to School (1966)
- The Chima Dynasty in Onitsha (1977)
- Faith Of Our Father's (2003)
- Troubled Dust (2012)
- Ahmad Daggash (Story of the True)(2016)
