= F. Nnabuenyi Ugonna =

Nigerian ethnologist and linguist

Frederick Nnabuenyi Ugonna, often abbreviated to F. Nnabuenyi Ugonna (12 October 1936, in Imo State, Nigeria – 5 June 1990, in London) was a Nigerian ethnologist, linguist, and writer. He is best known for his work on the Igbo language and other African languages as well as African literature.

Ugonna died of prostate cancer in 1990 in London.
