= Institute of Management and Technology, Enugu =

State polytechnic in Enugu, Nigeria

- Type: Public
- Established: 1965
- Accreditation: National Board for Technical Education
- Location: Enugu State, Nigeria
- Website: imt.edu.ng

The Institute of Management and Technology, Enugu, popularly known as IMT Enugu, is a Polytechnic located in Enugu State, Nigeria.

The state-owned Institute of Management and Technology is a Polytechnic school that was founded in the year 1965.

The National Board for Technical Education (NBTE), Nigeria, has officially certified and/or recognized the Institute of Management and Technology, Enugu, Enugu State.

== Notable alumni ==
- Azuka Okwuosa – former Anambra State Commissioner for Works and Transport
- Phyno – Nigerian Rapper, singer-songwriter and a record producer
- 2Baba – Grammy-nominated Nigerian musician

== Courses ==
The institution offers the following courses:

- Purchasing & Supply
- Graphic Design
- Printing Technology
- Fashion Design and Clothing Technology
- Fine & Applied Art
- Ceramic Technology
- Science Laboratory Technology
- Food Technology
- Hospitality Management
- Statistics
- Computer Science
- Estate Management
- Architecture
- Quantity Surveying
- Urban and Regional Planning
- Building Technology
- Insurance
- Banking and Finance
- Accountancy
- Library and Information science
- Mass Communication
- Mechatronics Engineering
- Mechanical Engineering
- Electrical/Electronics Engineering
- Civil Engineering
- Chemical Engineering
- Agric Engineering
- Public Administration
- Office Technology and Management
- Co-operative Economics and Management
- Business Admin and Management
