= Christ Holy Church International =

- Christ Holy Church International
- Country: Nigeria

Christ Holy Church International A.K.A Odozi-Obodo is an independent African church founded by Prophetess Agnes Amanye Okoh in Nigeria in 1947.

She had been inspired by a voice in her head repeatedly telling her to study "Matthew 10:10". An illiterate woman, she sought counsel and was inspired by the biblical text to start a ministry. She carried a Bible and a bell, and travelled on foot, by bus and train, through eastern Nigeria preaching at markets, starting with Enugu market. Hers was a faith ministry and she soon started to claim that she had the gift of prophecy and healing. She inspired a group of twelve itinerant evangelists to join her in her activities and started a prayer group at Onitsha in the same year.

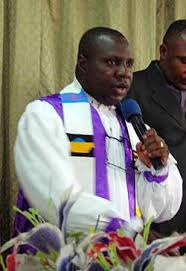
General Superintendent

Over the years the church has grown, and by 2002 had become an international organisation with nearly eight hundred congregations. By 2006, the church had nearly two million members and had congregations in three quarters of the states of Nigeria, and had also established a congregation in Togo, Kenya, Liberia, Ivory Coast, Republic of Benin, Ghana and more are still developing.

The mission of the church is to "worship the Triune God in holiness and to teach and spread the Good News of our Lord Jesus Christ across borders, race and cultures urgently, powerfully, faithfully, wisely, and fearlessly till Jesus Christ comes again" which constituted the church anthem.

Apart from evangelism, the church has set up schools in many villages and urban areas, as well as skills training centres. It also supports the Good News Theological College and Seminary, an interdenominational institution of higher learning in Accra, Ghana, which was founded in 1971. It has always continued to be a church that develops the community physically, socially and spiritually.

== The ruling body of the church ==
The Church has a total number of 4 bishops (including the general overseer) and 13 superintendents.

== Bishops ==
- The Most Rev (Dr.) Daniel Chukwudumebi Okoh, (G. O) (Archbishop of Province I Onitsha, Anambra State.) As of 2015
- The Rt. Rev. Obadigo Stephen Obiemeka (Bishop of Province III Aba, Abia State. )
- The Rt. Rev. Nwachukwu Emmanuel Aniagor (Bishop of Province II, Enugu, Enugu State.) As of 2020
- The Rt. Rev. Abel Amaraghara Oguejiofor (Bishop of Province IV, Nnewi, Anambra State.) As of 2021
