= List of Nigerian media personalities =

This is a list of notable Nigerian media personalities.

- Ebuka Obi-Uchendu
- Frank Edoho
- Moet Abebe
- Munachi Abii
- Aisha Salaudeen
- Gbenga Adeboye
- Ifeoma Aggrey-Fynn
- Taiwo Ajai-Lycett
- Kayode Akintemi
- Tisan Bako
- Bunmi Davies
- Anny Robert
- Nenny B
- Didi Akinyelure
- Joseph Benjamin
- Andre Blaze
- Monalisa Chinda
- Stephanie Coker
- CS Nwilliams
- DO2dTUN
- Kolade Dominate Olowu
- Eku Edewor
- Yvonne Ekwere
- Emmanuel "Mannie" Essien
- Daddy Freeze
- Murphy Ijemba
- Linda Ikeji
- IllRymz
- Toke Makinwa
- Tobechi Nneji
- Chika Oduah
- Femi Oke
- Hamza Idris
- Nedu Nwazobia
- Kiki Mordi
- Femi D Amele
- Olaitan Salaudeen
- Gbemi Olateru Olagbegi
- Bolanle Olukanni
- Jimitota Onoyume
- Adaora Onyechere
- Ikponmwosa Osakioduwa
- Otosirieze Obi-Young
- Mozez Praiz
- Yemi Shodimu
- DJ Spinall
- Cleopatra Tawo
- Toolz
- Tomike Adeoye
- Tope Tedela
- Jude Thomas Dawam
- Emma Ugolee
- Genevieve Nnaji
- Yinka Ayefele
