= 1958 in television =

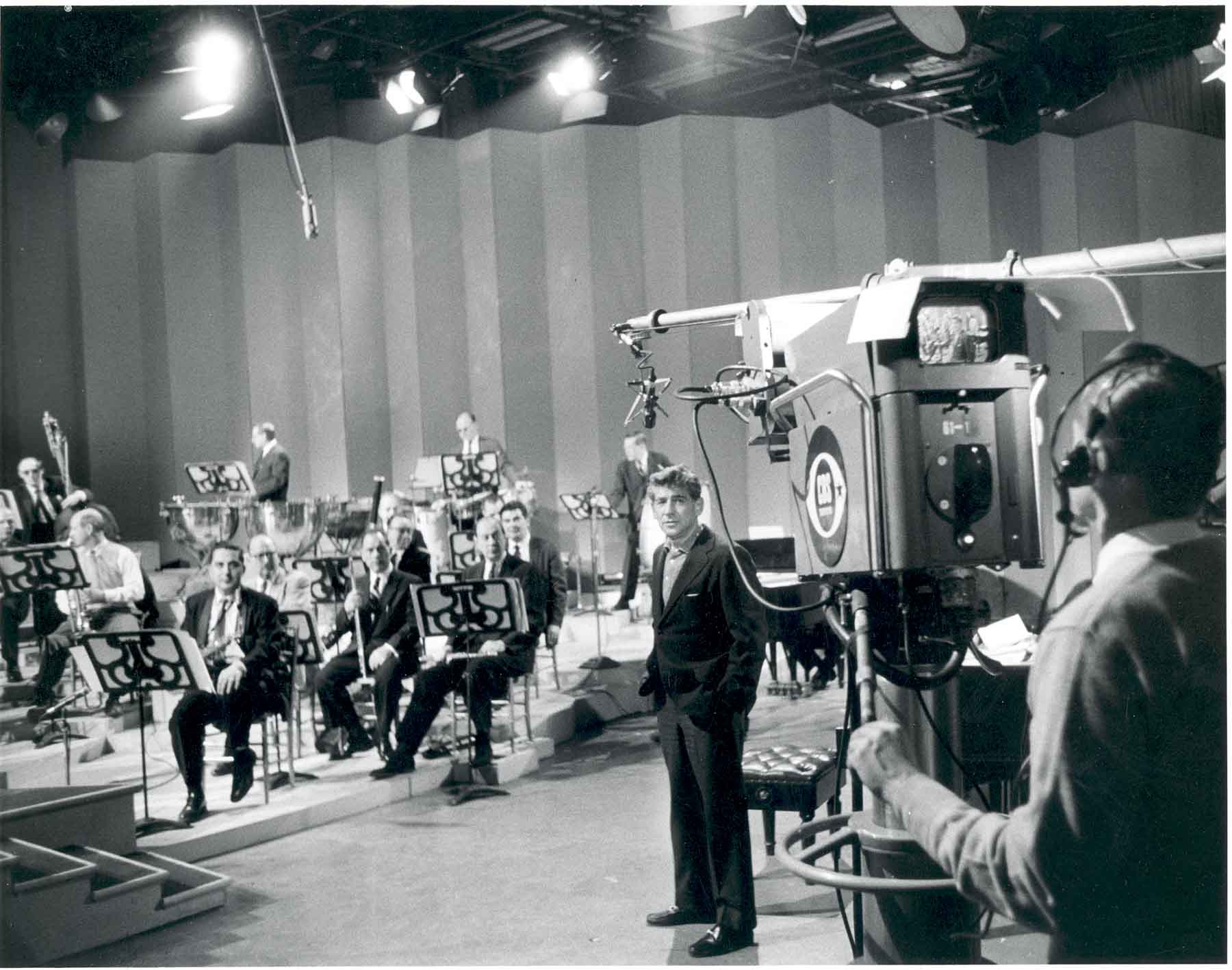

The year 1958 in television involved some significant events. Below is a list of television-related events during 1958.

== Events ==
- January 1 – Suomen Televisio, later known as Yle TV1, begins regular broadcasting.
- January 28 – Short-lived station KTRX signs on the air in Kennewick, Washington.
- January 14 – Television Wales and the West (TWW), the first ITV franchise for South Wales and West of England, begins broadcasting.
- January 17 – TV Peru, the first television channel in Peru, begins operations.
- January 25 – Royal Thai Channel 5, officially launched in Bangkok, Thailand.
- February 17 – Pope Pius XII designates St. Clare of Assisi the patron saint of television. Thereafter, placing her icon on a television set was said to improve reception.
- April 19 – Chronicle Broadcasting Network, the predecessor of ABS-CBN Corporation in the Philippines, launches DZXL-TV Channel 9.
- April 30 – Moldova TV signs on the air at 19:00, making it the very first television network in Moldova.
- May 2 – CCTV-1 began on an experimental basis as Peking Television.
- July 1 – The Canadian Broadcasting Corporation (CBC) links television broadcasting across Canada. The CBC's microwave network between Nova Scotia and British Columbia, completed this year, makes it the longest in the world.
- July 3 – The "Telecopter", a Bell Model 47 rented by television station KTLA in Los Angeles, and outfitted with a television camera, makes the world's first flight by a television news helicopter. Following a technical failure, it makes its first successful news flight the following day.
- August 23 – Television Belgrade, as predecessor for RTS 1, a first regular television broadcasting station officially service start in Serbia, former part of Yugoslavia.
- August 30 – Southern Television, the ITV franchise for South Central and South East England, begins broadcasting.
- September 16 – Orson Welles's The Fountain of Youth is broadcast on NBC-TV's Colgate Theatre. Filmed in 1956 for a proposed Desilu series, the half-hour program airs only once and becomes the only unsold pilot ever to win a Peabody Award.
- Fall – The quiz show scandals resulted in the cancellation of the original big-money game show, CBS' "The $64,000 Question", and creating havoc within the US television industry.
- October 1 – Shanghai Television, as early television station launched in China, first regular service to start.
- October 3 – Television Iran, as predecessor of IRIB TV1, a first regular program service television broadcasting station launched in Iran.
- October 17 – Fred Astaire makes his TV starring debut in the NBC special, An Evening with Fred Astaire, which later won nine Emmy Awards and is one of the first TV specials to be preserved on videotape.
- September 20 – Radio Valencia Televisión signs on the air in Venezuela with test transmissions began on April 30.
- November 30 – During the live broadcast of the Armchair Theatre play Underground on the ITV network in the UK, actor Gareth Jones suffers a fatal heart attack between two of his scenes while in make-up.
- December 15 – Channel 4, the flagship station of América Televisión, as well as the first every privately owned television station in Peru, begins officially regular broadcasting service first to viewers in Lima.
- SF DRS, the German-language Swiss television channel, debuts.
- Ampex demonstrates their design for a color video tape recorder.
- In the United Kingdom, the top-rated show of the year is the ITV game show Dotto, adapted from an American game show which in turn was based on children's Connect the dots game.
- The original American version of "Dotto" was the first game show to be implicated in the quiz show scandals, and was cancelled in August.
- Top-rated prime-time game show Twenty-One is cancelled by NBC in October after former contestant Herb Stempel charged that the series was rigged and that he had been ordered to lose a match to the popular Charles Van Doren.
- DuMont company sells its television manufacturing assets to Emerson company. The quality decreases.

== Programs/programmes ==
- Gillette Cavalcade of Sports (1946–1960)
- Howdy Doody (1947–1960)
- Meet the Press (1947–present)
- Candid Camera (1948–present)
- The Ed Sullivan Show (1948–1971)
- Bozo the Clown (1949–present)
- Come Dancing (UK) (1949–1995)
- The Voice of Firestone (1949–1963)
- The Jack Benny Show (1950–1965)
- Truth or Consequences (1950–1988)
- What's My Line (1950–1967)
- Your Hit Parade (1950–1959)
- Dragnet (1951–1959)
- Westinghouse Desilu Playhouse (1958–1960)
- I Love Lucy (1951–1960)
- Love of Life (1951–1980)
- Search for Tomorrow (1951–1986)
- Sergeant Preston of the Yukon (1955-1958)
- Hallmark Hall of Fame (1951–present)
- American Bandstand (1952–1989)
- The Adventures of Ozzie and Harriet (1952–1966)
- The Guiding Light (1952–2009)
- The Today Show (1952–present)
- This Is Your Life (1952–1961)
- Panorama (UK) (1953–present)
- The Good Old Days (UK) (1953–1983)
- Disneyland (1954–1958) ends on September 3, to resume on September 12 as Walt Disney Presents (1958–1961)
- Face the Nation (1954–present)
- The Brighter Day (1954–1962)
- The Milton Berle Show (1954–1967)
- The Secret Storm (1954–1974)
- The Tonight Show (1954–present)
- Zoo Quest (UK) (1954–1964)
- Alfred Hitchcock Presents (1955–1962)
- Captain Kangaroo (1955–1984)
- Cheyenne (1955–1962)
- Dixon of Dock Green (UK) (1955–1976)
- Gunsmoke (1955–1975)
- Jubilee USA (1955–1960)
- The Mickey Mouse Club (1955–1959)
- The Lawrence Welk Show (1955–1982)
- This Is Your Life (UK) (1955–2003)
- Armchair Theatre (UK) (1956–1968)
- As the World Turns (1956–2010)
- The Ford Show, Starring Tennessee Ernie Ford (1956–1961)
- Hancock's Half Hour (UK) (1956–1962)
- Opportunity Knocks (UK) (1956–1978)
- The Edge of Night (1956–1984)
- The Gale Storm Show, Oh! Susanna (1956–1960)
- The Jane Wyman Show, Fireside Theatre (1949-1958)
- The Price Is Right (1956–1965)
- The Steve Allen Show (1956–1960)
- What the Papers Say (UK) (1956–2008)
- The Pat Boone Chevy Showroom (1957–1960)
- The Army Game (UK) (1957–1961)
- Leave It to Beaver (1957–1963)
- The Real McCoys (1957-1963)
- The Sky at Night (UK) (1957–present)
- General Motors Presents (1953–1956, 1958–1961)

=== Debuts ===
- January 4 – Sea Hunt in syndication (1958–1961)
- January 20 – Love That Jill on ABC (1958)
- March 14 – Stahlnetz on West Germany's ARD (1958–1968)
- April 19 – The Adventures of Nicholas Nickleby on Italy's RAI 1 (1958)
- June 16 – Variety View (1958–1959) (Melbourne, Australia)
- June 19 – Confession, hosted by Jack Wyatt, on ABC (1958–1959)
- June 23 – Polka Go-Round on ABC (1958–1959)
- August 25 – Concentration on NBC (1958–1973)
- September 6 – Wanted Dead or Alive on CBS (1958–1961)
- September 22 – Peter Gunn on NBC (1958–1961)
- September 24 – The Donna Reed Show on ABC (1958–1966)
- September 29 – The Huckleberry Hound Show, Hanna Barbera's second series, in syndication (1958–1962)
- September 30 – The Rifleman on ABC (1958–1963)
- October 2
  - Behind Closed Doors on NBC (1958–1959)
  - The Unforeseen on CBC (1958–1960)
- October 5
  - Lawman on ABC (1958–1962)
  - Encounter, an anthology series originating from Toronto, Ontario, Canada, began a five-week run on ABC, having been cancelled after the November 2 episode
- October 8 – Bat Masterson on NBC (1958–1961)
- October 10
  - 77 Sunset Strip on ABC (1958–1964)
  - Grandstand on BBC Television (1958–2007)
  - Man with a Camera on ABC (1958-1960)
- October 15 – Mole's Adventure (Japan), the oldest surviving anime television show.
- October 16 – Blue Peter, the world's longest-running children's TV programme, debuts on BBC Television (1958–present)
- October 17 – An Evening With Fred Astaire on NBC; first show prerecorded on color videotape, wins nine Emmy Awards
- November 4 – Flight (1958–1959) syndicated premiere on NBC NYC; produced by California National Presentation
- November 7 – Our Mutual Friend on BBC Television (1958–1959)
- December 22 – Quatermass and the Pit on BBC Television (1958–1959)
- Autumn Affair (1958–1959), the first Australian-produced television soap opera (on ATN-7 in Sydney, starting 1959 also shown on GTV-9 in Melbourne)
- Café Continental (1958–1961) (Sydney and Melbourne Australia)
- Don Messer's Jubilee (1958–1969)
- The Friendly Giant (1958–1985)
- The Shirley Abicair Show (1958) (Sydney and Melbourne Australia)
- Your Life in Their Hands on BBC Television (1958–1964 and many revivals)
- Unknown – This is Alice in first-run syndication (1958–1959)

=== Ending this year ===
Date	Show	Debut
March 30	Sally	1957
April 14	Love That Jill	1958
April 28	Adventures of Superman	1952
May 16	Dick and the Duchess	1957
May 31	The Polly Bergen Show	1957
June 7	The Life of Riley	1953
June 13	The Patrice Munsel Show	1957
June 24	Educated Evans	1957
June 26	Climax!	1954
July 8	Mr. Adams and Eve	1957
September 6	Club Oasis	1957
September 15	The George Burns and Gracie Allen Show	1950
September 25	Sergeant Preston of the Yukon	1955
October 1	Kraft Television Theatre	1947
Unknown	The Jeannie Carson Show	1956

== Births ==
Date	Name	Notability
January 1	Renn Woods	Actress (Roots)
January 4	Matt Frewer	Actor (Max Headroom, The Pink Panther)
January 12	Christiane Amanpour	Host
January 17	Deran Sarafian	Actor
January 20	Lorenzo Lamas	Actor (Falcon Crest)
January 26	Ellen DeGeneres	Actress & talk show host (Ellen)
January 27	Susanna Thompson	Actress (Once and Again)
January 29	Judy Norton Taylor	Actress (The Waltons)
January 30	Brett Butler	Actress (Grace Under Fire)
February 2	Douglas McGrath	Actor (died 2022)
February 13	Donal Gibson	Actor
February 16	Lisa Loring	Actress (The Addams Family)
February 16	Ice-T	Actor & rapper (Law & Order: Special Victims Unit)
February 19	Leslie David Baker	Actor (The Office)
February 21	Jack Coleman	Actor (Dynasty, Heroes)
February 21	Kim Coates	Actor
February 21	Denise Dowse	Actress (Beverly Hills, 90210, The Guardian, Charmed)
February 23	Norm Spencer	Actor (X-Men: The Animated Series, Rescue Heroes) (died 2020)
February 24	Todd Fisher	Actor
February 24	Margaret Larson	Presenter
February 25	Mark Moses	Actor (Desperate Housewives, Mad Men)
February 26	Greg Germann	Actor (Ally McBeal)
February 26	Tim Kaine	Politician
March 3	Miranda Richardson	Actress
March 4	Patricia Heaton	Actress (Everybody Loves Raymond, The Middle)
March 10	Sharon Stone	Actress
March 10	Mary Murphy	Choreographer
March 15	Deb Lacusta	Actress
March 17	Christian Clemenson	Actor (CSI: Miami, Boston Legal)
March 19	Fred Stoller	Actor & comedian (Everybody Loves Raymond)
March 20	Holly Hunter	Actress (The Incredibles)
March 21	Gary Oldman	Actor & filmmaker
March 21	Brad Hall	Actor (Saturday Night Live, The Single Guy, Watching Ellie)
March 21	Sabrina Le Beauf	Actress (The Cosby Show)
March 22	Laurie David	American environmental activist
March 25	James McDaniel	Actor (NYPD Blue)
March 27	Michael O'Leary	Actor & screenwriter (Guiding Light)
March 30	Maurice LaMarche	Voice actor (The Brain on Animaniacs)
April 2	Amelia Marshall	Soap opera actress
April 2	Jon Klein	CNN former president
April 3	Alec Baldwin	Actor (30 Rock)
April 4	Constance Shulman	Actress (Doug, Orange is the New Black)
April 14	John D'Aquino	Actor (seaQuest DSV, Cory in the House)
April 21	Andie MacDowell	Actress
April 26	Giancarlo Esposito	Actor
April 26	Tommy Habeeb	American television host
April 29	Eve Plumb	Actress (The Brady Bunch)
April 29	Michelle Pfeiffer	Actress
April 29	Rosanna Scotto	American news anchor
May 1	Nick Stellino	Chef, author and TV presenter
May 10	Rick Santorum	Politician and commentator (CNN, Newsmax TV)
May 20	Matt McCoy	Actor
May 21	Tim Hill	Actor
May 23	Drew Carey	Actor, comedian, game show host (The Price Is Right)
May 23	Lea DeLaria	Actress, comedian
May 26	Margaret Colin	Actress (As the World Turns, Gossip Girl)
May 27	Linnea Quigley	Actress
May 29	Karen Maruyama	Actress
May 30	Ted McGinley	Actor (Married... with Children, Hope & Faith)
May 31	Roma Maffia	Actress (Profiler)
June 5	Beth Hall	Actress
June 7	Prince	Singer and actor (died 2016)
June 12	Rebecca Holden	Actress & singer
June 21	Eric Douglas	Actor
June 22	Bruce Campbell	Actor (Burn Notice) & director
June 27	Robert Newman	Actor
July 3	Rick Sanchez	Journalist
July 4	Steve Hartman	Sportcaster
July 5	Peter Tolan	Writer
July 6	Jennifer Saunders	Actress & comedian (Absolutely Fabulous)
July 8	Kevin Bacon	Actor
July 11	John Tinker	Writer
July 14	Joe Keenan	Writer
July 14	Gail Mancuso	American film and television director
July 20	Billy Mays	American television direct-response advertisement salesperson (died 2009)
July 23	Keenan Ivory Wayans	Actor & comedian (In Living Color)
July 24	Joe Keenan	Writer
July 27	Vincenzo Nicoli	Actor (Hank Zipzer)
July 28	Michael Hitchcock	Actor
July 28	Isaac Florentine	Israeli film director
July 30	Richard Burgi	Actor (The Sentinel, Desperate Housewives)
July 31	Mark Cuban	Television personality, and NBA basketball team owner
August 1	Michael Penn	Composer
August 6	Ira Angustain	Actor (The White Shadow)
August 8	Deborah Norville	TV presenter (Today, Inside Edition)
August 9	Amanda Bearse	Actress (Married... with Children)
August 10	John Goldwyn	American film producer
August 13	David Feherty	Golfer
August 15	Rondell Sheridan	Actor (That's So Raven)
August 16	Angela Bassett	Actress
August 16	Madonna	Singer & actress
August 16	Jonathan Prince	Actor
August 18	Madeleine Stowe	Actress (Revenge)
August 18	Steven Zirnkilton	American voice actor
August 18	Reg E. Cathey	American actor (died 2018)
August 22	Colm Feore	American-Canadian actor (24, House of Cards)
August 24	Steve Guttenberg	Actor
August 25	Christian LeBlanc	Actor (The Young and the Restless)
August 29	Lenny Henry	English actor and comedian (Chef!)
August 29	Michael Jackson	Singer and actor (died 2009)
September 3	Kevin Kiner	Composer
September 4	Drew Pinsky	American media personality
September 6	Jeff Foxworthy	American actor
September 11	Roxann Dawson	Actress (Star Trek: Voyager)
September 11	Julia Nickson	Actress
September 11	Scott Patterson	Actor (Gilmore Girls)
September 12	Kim Fupz Aakeson	Writer
September 14	Terry Dubrow	American plastic surgeon and television personality
September 16	Jennifer Tilly	Actress
September 19	Kevin Hooks	Actor & director (The White Shadow)
September 21	Penny Smith	TV presenter
September 21	Jennifer Caron Hall	Actress
September 22	Kevin Sorbo	Actor (Hercules: The Legendary Journeys)
September 26	Dan Foster	Talent show judge (Idols, Nigeria's Got Talent) (died 2020)
September 27	Shaun Cassidy	Actor
September 29	Karen Young	Actress
October 1	Clyde Phillips	Writer
October 5	Neil deGrasse Tyson	Astrophysicist
October 9	Michael Paré	Actor
October 16	Tim Robbins	Actor
October 19	Michael Steele	Political commentator (MSNBC)
October 20	Scott Hall	American pro wrestler (ECW, TNA, NJPW, WCW, WWE) (died 2022)
October 20	Eric Scott	Actor (The Waltons)
October 22	Michael Price	Writer
October 23	Jonathan Wolff	American composer
October 23	Viggo Mortensen	American actor
October 27	Nina Easton	American author, journalist, TV commentator, entrepreneur, and film producer
October 31	Debbie McGee	English television, radio and stage performer
November 1	Rachel Ticotin	Actress (Ohara, Skin, Law & Order: LA)
November 1	Stephen Hopkins	Director
November 5	Robert Patrick	Actor (The X-Files, Scorpion)
November 7	Jon Scott	American television news anchor
November 9	Reid Harrison	Writer
November 11	Donna Wilkes	Actress
November 12	Megan Mullally	Actress & singer (Will & Grace, Bob's Burgers)
November 16	Marg Helgenberger	Actress (Ryan's Hope, China Beach, CSI: Crime Scene Investigation)
November 16	Julie Johnson	Actress
November 17	Mary Elizabeth Mastrantonio	Actress
November 18	Oscar Nunez	Cuban-American actor (The Office)
November 19	Terrence C. Carson	Singer and actor (Living Single, Star Wars: The Clone Wars)
November 22	Jamie Lee Curtis	Actress (Anything But Love)
November 22	Mark Malone	American football quarterback
November 24	Alain Chabat	Actor
November 25	Dana Tyler	News anchor
November 29	Devon Scott	Actress
December 1	Charlene Tilton	Actress (Dallas)
December 7	Edd Hall	US announcer
December 10	John J. York	US soap actor
December 11	Isabella Hofmann	Actress
December 12	Sheree J. Wilson	Actress (Dallas, Walker, Texas Ranger)
December 13	Clark Brandon	Actor (The Fitzpatricks, Mr. Merlin)
December 25	Cheryl Chase	Voice actress (Angelica Pickles on Rugrats)
December 27	Barbara Crampton	Actress (Days of Our Lives)
December 31	Bebe Neuwirth	Actress, singer and dancer (Cheers, Frasier)
December 31	Johnny Hardwick	Voice actor (King of the Hill) (died 2023)

== Television debuts ==
- Alan Alda – The Phil Silvers Show
- Heather Angel – Studio 57
- Bonnie Bedelia – Playhouse 90
- Bruno Cremer – En votre ame et conscience
- Louise Fletcher – Flight
- Charles Grodin – Decision
- George Hamilton – The Veil
- Richard Harris – Play of the Week
- Barry Humphries – Wild Life and Christmas Belles
- Michael Lonsdale – En votre ame et conscience
- Jan Malmsjö – Min syster och jag
- Donald Moffat – Naked City
- Michael J. Pollard – Omnibus
- Vanessa Redgrave – Sunday Night Theatre
- Oliver Reed – The Invisible Man
- Maximilian Schell – Der Meisterdieb
- Vic Tayback – Buckskin
