= Cleopatra Tawo =

Nigerian radio host

- Born: 29 October; Port Harcourt, Rivers State, Nigeria
- Died: 1 December 2017; University of Uyo Teaching Hospital, Akwa Ibom State, Nigeria
- Other names: Cleo, Cleo Tao
- Occupation: Radio host
- Years active: 2000–2017

Cleopatra Tawo, known more commonly as Cleo Tao (died 1 December 2017) was a radio host at Planet FM 101.1 in Uyo, Akwa Ibom State, Nigeria. She was the host of the radio shows DayBreak on Planet and AutoMania. Before joining Planet FM, Tawo worked at Rhythm FM 93.7 in Port Harcourt, Rivers State, where she hosted shows such as Morning Drive, Afternoon Drive, Sunday at the Rhythm and Midnight Caller.

== Early life ==
Tawo was raised in Port Harcourt, the capital of Rivers State, Nigeria. She grew up in a Catholic family originally from Boki, though her parents were enlightened liberals who encouraged entertainment in their home.

== Career ==
Tawo was trained as a lawyer before venturing into radio broadcasting in 2000. Her first professional employment as a radio host was at Silverbird's Rhythm FM 93.7 in Port Harcourt. There, she hosted several shows including Morning Drive, Afternoon Drive, Sunday at the Rhythm and Midnight Caller. She was later employed at Planet FM 101.1 Uyo, where she hosted shows like Daybreak on Planet and AutoMania. Tawo was also the station's Head Of Programmes.

== Legal issues ==
On 19 December 2005, she was arrested along with colleague Klem Ofuokwu by agents of the State Security Service (SSS). They were charged with airing fabricated news about a bridge failure on Rhythm 93.7 FM Port Harcourt. Rivers State Attorney General Henry Ajumogobia withdrew the charges on 2 February 2006. They had been detained for two weeks before being released on bail.

== Death ==
During late November 2017, Tawo began suffering from a respiratory illness and was admitted to a hospital. On 1 December 2017, she died at the University of Uyo Teaching Hospital. Tawo was admitted to UUTH's emergency intensive care unit. Prior to her death, she had posted a status update on her facebook account that "[she] had a respiratory challenge, I’m responding to treatment. I’ll be out soon. Thnx for your kind prayers".

== See also ==
- List of people from Rivers State
- List of Nigerian media personalities
