= Silverbird =

Silverbird or Silver Bird may refer to:

== Companies and brands ==
- SILVERBIRD, the callsign of IRS Airlines of Nigeria
- Silverbird Group, a Nigerian multinational conglomerate
  - Silverbird Cinema (disambiguation)
  - Silverbird Galleria, a shopping mall in Victoria Island, Lagos, Nigeria
- Silverbird Hotel, now El Rancho Hotel and Casino, Las Vegas, Nevada, US

== Music ==
- Silverbird (album), by Leo Sayer, or the title song, 1973
- Silverbird, an album by Mark Lindsay, 1970
- "Silver Bird" (Mark Lindsay song), 1970
- "Silver Bird" (Tina Rainford song), 1976
- "Silver Bird", a song by the Guess Who, 1976

== Science and technology ==
- Silbervogel, a World War II German rocket bomber
- Silver Bird (streamliner), a land-speed record motorcycle
- Silverbird (aircraft), a rocket-powered aircraft design
- Silverbird (bird), a passerine bird native to eastern Africa
- Silverbird (software), a defunct software label owned by Telecomsoft

== Content creators and content ==
- Silverbird cinematics, a content creator who focuses on cinematic films in games such as War Thunder
