= Amarachi (given name) =

Nigerian given name

- Gender: Unisex
- Language: Igbo

Origin
- Origin: Nigeria
- Meaning: Chi's grace
- Region of origin: Igboland

Amarachi // is an Igbo unisex given name which translates to "chi's grace" in English.

== Notable individuals with the names ==
- Amarachi (born July 17, 2004) – Nigerian singer
- Bede Amarachi Osuji (born January 21, 1996) – Nigerian footballer
- Amarachi Obiajunwa (born October 10, 1989) – Nigerian wrestler
- Victoria Amarachi Ugwunna (born August 7, 1996) - Nigerian flight attendant and linguist.
