= Tobechi Nneji =

Nigerian radio personality

Tobe Da Diva
- Born: Tobechi Lawrencia Nneji; 19 January 1987 (age 39); Lagos
- Education: Madonna University; University of Calabar
- Occupations: On-Air Personality, TV host, Vlogger
- Years active: 2007–2016
- Website: Official website

Tobe Da Diva or Tobedadiva (born Tobechi Lawrencia Nneji on 19 January 1987) is a Nigerian radio personality, and television host. In 2013, ThisDay described her show as "the most listened-to show in all of Eastern Nigeria at mid-day In 2013, she had a short stint on TV, hosting Channel O's special edition program “Top Ten Most. The Music Commentators” and represented Nigeria in the second season of BET'S Top Actor Africa. She has also published a podcast series, MPW - offering support to new radio personalities. she is regarded as a witty, fun, and smart lady who loves travelling.

== Background and education ==
The last of five children, she hails from Imo State, southeastern region of Nigeria. An alumna of Queen's College, Lagos State, southwest Nigeria, she studied Economics at Madonna University, graduating in 2007. She is currently studying for a master's degree in the same course at the University of Calabar, Cross River State, south-south Nigeria.

== Career ==
In 2007, she went for a radio audition with Vision FM, Abuja and went on air for the first time on Christmas Day that year. She worked there till 2009 when she moved to Kiss FM till 2010 and worked as a presenter, before taking a one-year break. In 2011, she returned to Kiss FM and rose to be Head of OAPs. While she was there, she hosted the morning show (Morning Experience) and was the anchor of the Current Affairs Talk Show, Naijalysis. At the age of 24, she rose to the position of News Editor and handled the casting of all the major news bulletins on the station.

In 2012, she got an offer to move to Enugu and join the team at Enugu's Dream FM, owned by Deputy Senate President, Ike Ekweremadu. Initially sceptical, she eventually moved to Enugu to take up the position of ‘Programs Manager’ at 25, becoming the youngest female Radio Programs Manager ever in Nigeria. Along with that, she functioned as the Programs Analyst, interfacing between the business and the technology, to achieve consistent business progress. She was also a presenter and created the morning show on the station, the wake-up show, which she co-hosted with Jude Thomas Dawam.

Tobe has worked with brands including Gulder, Amstel Malta, Nokia, and Airtel. Her work includes hosting events, social media engagements, and brand engagement strategies on her shows and online platforms. She has a social media following of several thousand people.

In 2012, she was a finalist in the MTV Base VJ Search The next year, she was a semi-finalist in The Next Titan TV show, an entrepreneurship game show, and came sixth.

Tobe was one of the actors representing Nigeria in the second season of BET'S Top Actor Africa, her first venture into acting for film and theatre.

In 2014, her track record of success in the management, analysis and strategy development in the radio business got her tapped by Godfrey Okoye University to set up and run a radio station for the university, GoUni Radio. She took up the contract, functioning as the business analyst and deputy station manager. In that position she established the business process and unified brand identity of the station.

In 2015, Tobe relocated to the United States and used her skills as a business analyst and communicator to facilitate the implementation of projects with a local firm, Ignite Consults. In 2017, for her 30th birthday, she released her first documentary project The 4th Decade, which has gained positive feedback. She has created and published online material to support aspiring radio and TV presenters – MPW Podcast Series and The Presenters Vlog.

=== Midday Express ===
She created and developed the Midday Express which she hosted, with music by the veteran DJ FX2. The Midday Express became the first midday show in southeastern Nigeria with daily DJ play.

In 2013, a few months after the start of the show, TobeDaDiva was nominated as the Outstanding Presenter on a midday show in the Southeast at the Nigerian Broadcasters’ Merit Awards. In 2014, she was nominated again and this time, she won the Award. In 2014, she was also nominated in the categories of Sexiest On-Air Personality and Nigerian Broadcaster of the Year at the NBMAs. At the Scream Youth awards, she was also nominated for the award of On Air Personality of the year.

=== Vlog ===
She started a weekly Vlog series, ‘Bedroom Diaries’ from her experiences, to trends and ideas. The channel, since its inception, has cumulatively garnered views running into thousands on YouTube.

=== MPW ===
In February 2016, Tobe started a 13-part podcast series – Media Personality Workshop (MPW) to aid young radio personalities gain a foothold of their career. In October 2016, she created a video series for the same purpose – The presenter vlogs.

=== Channel O ===
In 2013, she had a short stint on TV, hosting Channel O's special edition program Top Ten Most …The Music Commentators.

== Awards ==
Year	Award	Category	Result	Notes
2014	Nigeria Broadcasters' Merit Awards	Outstanding Presenter on a midday show (south east)	Won	
2014	Nigeria Broadcasters' Merit Awards	Nigerian Broadcaster Of The Year	Nominated	
Nigeria Broadcasters' Merit Awards	sexiest OAP ( Female)	Nominated		
Scream Youth Awards	on-air personality of the year	Nominated		
2013 Nigeria Broadcasters' Merit Awards	Outstanding Presenter on a midday show (south east)		Nominated	

== See also ==
- List of Igbo people
- List of Nigerian media personalities
