= Surrattsville High School =

Location
- 6101 Garden Drive; Clinton, Maryland 20735; United States
- Coordinates: 38°45′43″N 76°54′6″W

Information
- School type: Public, High school
- Established: 1959; 67 years ago
- School district: Prince George's County Public School System
- Principal: Katrina Lamont
- Faculty: 60.50 (FTE) (2016–17)
- Grades: 9–12
- Gender: Co-ed
- Enrollment: 738 (2016–17)
- Student to teacher ratio: 12.20 (2016–17)
- Colors: Kelly Green; White
- Mascot: Hornets
- Website: www.pgcps.org/surrattsville/

Surrattsville High School or SHS is a public high school located in Clinton, Maryland, United States and is a part of the Prince George's County Public School System in Prince George's County, Maryland.

Surrattsville was the town of Clinton's original name, taken from Mary Surratt and her family, who once owned the property on which the school now stands.

== History ==
In 2009, Sheryll Cashin said in The Failures of Integration: How Race and Class are Undermining the American Dream that Surrattsville High was one of several mostly black, mostly middle class PG County public high schools that was "decidedly underachieving: fewer than half of the seniors at these schools went on to attend four-year colleges in recent years."

== Athletics ==
Davin Meggett, son of former NFL player Dave Meggett, was part of a playoff appearance by the football team in 2007. The younger Meggett also played for the school baseball team.

Surrattsville won the Maryland State Championship in 1962 and 1965, when it competed in the AA class, the largest at that time.

== Notable alumni ==
- Beth Bernobich née Elizabeth Witmeyer — Lambda Literary Award-winning author
- Harry Dunn — United States Capitol Police officer who responded to the January 6 attack
- Dan Foster — radio DJ and judge, Nigeria's Got Talent
- Dennis Felton — Cleveland State basketball coach
- Marcia Gay Harden — Academy Award-winning actress (2001 Best Supporting Actress, Pollock)
- Davin Meggett — NFL running back (Houston Texans, Washington Redskins)
- Thomas V. Miller Jr. — President of the Maryland Senate
- Laura Wright (née Sisk) — soap opera actress in Guiding Light and General Hospital
