= Dan Foster (DJ) =

American radio broadcaster (1958–2020)

- Born: September 26, 1958; San Francisco, California, U.S.
- Died: June 17, 2020 (aged 61); Lagos, Nigeria
- Occupations: DJ, Radio producer
- Children: 4

Daniel Leon Foster (September 26, 1958 – June 17, 2020), popularly known as The Big Dawg, was an American radio personality and media consultant based in Nigeria. Formerly an Idol judge, he also held a similar position with the Got Talent franchise.

== Early life and education ==
Foster was born in San Francisco and raised with his three siblings in Prince George's County, Maryland, near Washington, D.C. by their father Samuel, an Air Force veteran. His mother died when he was ten, and he sporadically lived with his grandmother in Baltimore. As a teenager, Foster played football at Surrattsville High School. After graduating from high school, he signed up with the Marines to earn a scholarship, and hosted his own show on the Marines' radio service. After leaving the Marines he attended Towson University, but later transferred to Morgan State University where he studied Broadcasting and Drama.

== Career ==
=== Radio ===
Foster worked with numerous radio stations including Cathy Hughes Radio One and Mix 106.5, and the Virgin Island-based WTBN before moving to Nigeria in February 2000, replacing fellow American Mark Silvia on Cool FM's Good Morning Nigeria Show. Foster immersed himself in his adapted country's culture, dropping phrases from the vernacular into his on-air Baltimorese banter, and hosting various segments including Inspirational Thought and Candid Phone which quickly became popular with Nigerian listeners.

Foster was named Best Radio Presenter the following year, and won the Nigeria Media Merit Award for Best Radio Personality in 2003, 2004, and 2005. He was also honoured by the City People Awards as Media Person of the Year in 2004 and 2005.

In 2008, Foster left Cool FM for the newly established Inspiration FM where he was made Head of Programmes, but left in 2014 to join City FM. In May 2016, Foster joined oldies station Classic FM 97.3 radio station where he hosted The Morning Show until August 2019.

=== Television ===
In 2007, Foster was a judge on the one-off Idols West Africa series, alongside Nigerian musician Dede Mabiaku and Ghanaian singer Abrewa Nana. During the show's run he was compared to American counterpart Randy Jackson, although he received criticism for not attending the Ghana auditions. In 2012 and 2013, he served as a judge on Nigeria's Got Talent alongside actress Kate Henshaw and comedian Yibo Koko.

=== Other ventures ===
In 2001, Foster had a minor role in the Nollywood film Face of a Liar. As a promoter, he created and directed the Cool FM Praise Jam concerts which commenced from 2004, with a total of over 22,000 people in attendance.

== Personal life ==
Foster had a son, Joshua, from his previous marriage. Married to a Nigerian, Lovina Okpara, the couple were parents to daughters Kayla and Daniella, and son Somtochukwu.

Foster died from complications of COVID-19 during the pandemic on June 17, 2020, a day after being diagnosed.

== Legacy ==
Foster has been credited with using his spontaneous presenting style to set the template for modern radio, thus revolutionising Nigeria's broadcasting industry. Silverbird's Ben Murray-Bruce described him as a "veteran radio host bar none." Veteran journalist Ben Tomoloju praised Foster for raising the bar in broadcasting, stating "There is a pan-nationalistic dimension to his personality, a role model, a solid phenomenon on air and off-air."

Foster's popularity inspired a new generation of mainstream on-air personalities who emulated his style by resonating with listeners with their inspirational and conversational approach. He mentored various beginners in the broadcasting field, and planned to establish his own radio station prior to his death.
