= Jude Thomas Dawam =

Nigerian Radio Personality

- Born: Jude Thomas Longtong Dawam; 31 January 1979 (age 47); Lagos
- Other names: Uncle Jude, Alhaji Tanko, Longplan
- Education: University of Jos
- Occupations: Radio Personality, Actor, Musician
- Years active: 2007–date
- Spouse: Elohor Thomas-Dawam (m. 2015)
- Children: 2

Jude Thomas Dawam (born 31 January 1979) is a Nigerian radio personality, actor and musician. He started out as a musician playing the guitar before becoming a radio personality and actor.

== Biography ==
Born Jude Thomas Longtong Dawam in Lagos, he has ancestors from Pankshin Plateau State. He has a Bachelor of Pharmacy degree from the University of Jos, Nigeria. He is married to Elohor Thomas-Dawam, and they have two children.

== Career ==
He started out as a musician with the group B Flat, managed by Kiss entertainment. Subsequently, he set up a band called Evolution Six which featured in the 2007 edition of the band-based competition Star Quest Nigeria sponsored by STAR Lager, for which they were runner ups. In 2007 he started radio broadcasting with Kiss FM, Abuja. After a brief stint at Vision FM, Abuja, he moved to Dream 92.5 FM, Enugu, in 2013. He won the 2014 Nigerian Broadcasters Merit Awards for Outstanding Radio Program Presenter – South-East (Morning Ride 5am–11am). In 2015 he was a regional judge for Project Fame West Africa held in Port Harcourt and Mtv Base Vj Search held in Enugu in 2016.

He made his movie debut in 2016 with a credited cameo appearance in Ernest Obi's Poka Messiah as the character Shiekh. He was cast the same year in a supporting role as Sanusi in Mummy Why by Ernest Obi. His performance in Mummy Why earned him a nomination at the Calabar Movie Awards in the best supporting actor category alongside veteran actor Jide Kosoko and Blossom Chukwujekwu. In 2019 he played the protagonist in the Limited release action flick Wrong Initiation by Nani Boi.

=== Alhaji Tanko ===
In 2020 he has been more active using his alias Alhaji Tanko, an illiterate comical/satirical character of Hausa origin. The character was derived from his role as Sanusi from the movie Mummy Why. He has made a number of comedy skits and Music under this pseudonym.

== Awards ==
Year	Award	Category	Result	Notes
2017	Calabar Movie Awards	Best Supporting Actor	Nominated	
2014	Nigerian Broadcasters Merit Awards	Outstanding Radio Program Presenter – South-East (Morning Ride 5am–11am)	Won	

== Filmography ==
Year	Film	Role	Notes
2023	Bleeding Butterfly	Alhaji Tanko	Starring Swanky JKA
2021	Umoja	Human 2	Starring Lorenzo Menakaya (Short Film)
2019	Wrong Initiation	Stone	Starring Nani Boi, Dekumzy
2016	Mummy Why	Sanusi	Starring Pete Edochie, Uche Ogbodo
2016	Poka Messiah	Shiekh	Starring Yul Edochie, Alex Usifo

== See also ==
- List of Nigerian media personalities
