= Abrewa Nana =

Ghanaian musician

- Born: Dorcas Opoku Dakwa; 3 December 1980 (age 45); Ghana
- Genres: Rap, hip-hop, Hiplife
- Occupations: Singer-songwriter, rapper, Idol series judge
- Years active: 2000–present
- Labels: Alordia Promotions

Dorcas Opoku Dakwa (born 3 December 1980), known professionally as Abrewa Nana, is a Ghanaian singer, songwriter, dancer and former Idol series judge.

== Early life and education ==
Nana's parents are Isaac Dakwa and Juliana Blankson. The name "Abrewa" literally means "old woman" in the Akan language, her mother tongue. She adopted this as her stage name partly because she had been named after her grandmother. Raised mostly by her single mother, Nana attended primary school in Accra and Aggrey Memorial Senior High School, before studying Business Accounting at the Takoradi Polytechnic. As a teenager, she idolized Mariah Carey and Aaliyah, but was introduced to hiplife – a combination of hip hop and African highlife – as a student in polytechnic, and began to compose her own lyrics.

== Musical career ==
Following the recording of her demo, Nana became a favorite among radio DJs, and her collaboration with Sass Squad Tuma received huge airplay. However, it was her first album Sagoa, in 2000, that launched her to national fame. She earned three nominations at the Ghana Music Awards for Female Artiste of the Year, Rap Song of the Year, and New Artiste of the Year. In 2001, Nana won an award for hiplife Song of the Year and was named Best Female Vocalist in 2002. That same year, Nana released her second album African Girl, and was named Best Female Artiste of the Year at the Ghana Music Awards UK the following year. Her third album Maba followed in 2004. Nana is also a dancer and famous for her heavily choreographed videos. Nana has shared a stage with artists such as Akon, 2Face and Tony Tetuila Nana has since used her position to criticize local DJs who favor foreign artists over African performers, and has spoken of the difficulty Ghanaians face when breaking into the music industry, including payola.

== Idols West Africa ==
In 2007, it was announced that Nana would be a judge on Idols West Africa, alongside the Nigerian Dede Mabiaku and the American Dan Foster; at twenty-seven, she was one of the youngest judges in Idols' history. She advised contestants during the event to remember "to have a style of their own". Nana also said contestants to "remember it is a competition, and you can win or lose but whether you winner or not, follow your dream".
