= Davin Meggett =

American football player (born 1990)

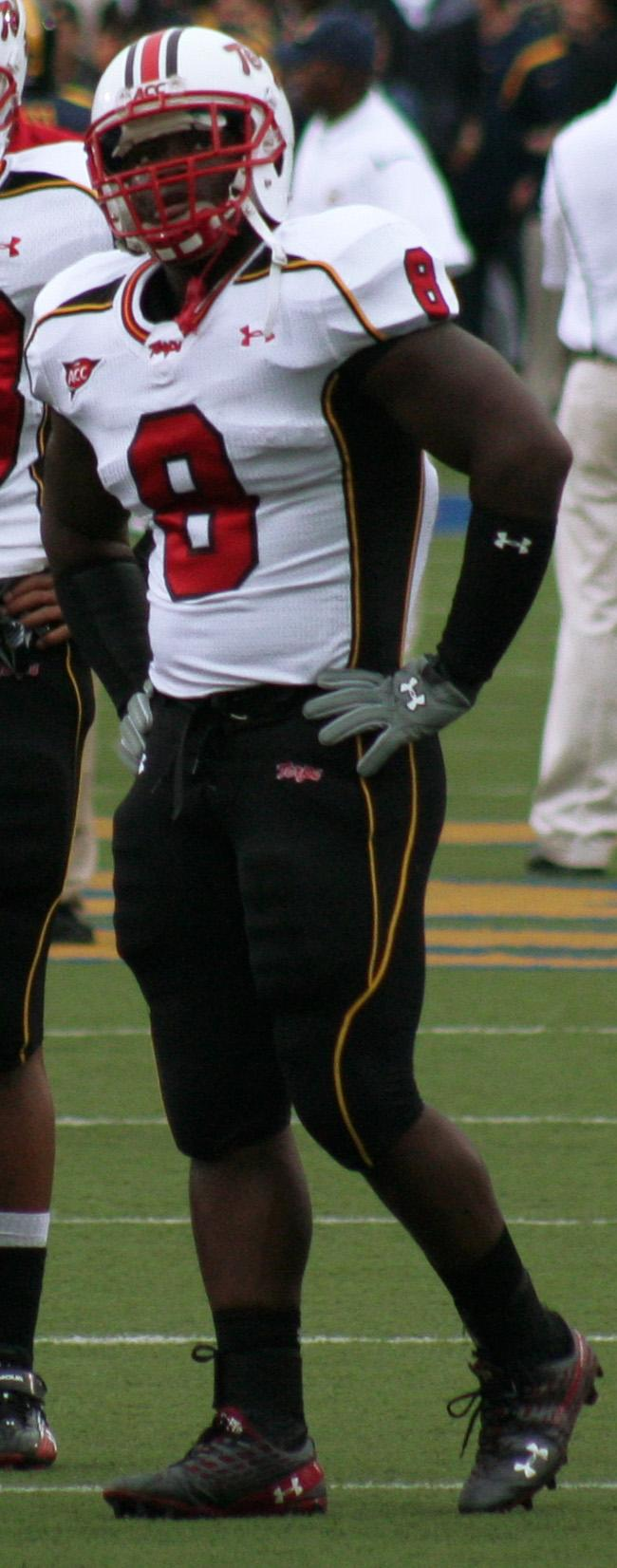
- Meggett with Maryland

No. 8
- Position: Running back

Personal information
- Born: March 22, 1990 (age 36); Clinton, Maryland, U.S.
- Listed height: 5 ft 8 in (1.73 m)
- Listed weight: 215 lb (98 kg)

Career information
- High school: Clinton (MD) Surrattsville
- College: Maryland
- NFL draft: 2012: undrafted

Career history
- Houston Texans (2012)*; Indianapolis Colts (2012–2013)*; Dallas Cowboys (2013)*; Washington Redskins (2013–2014)*; Winnipeg Blue Bombers (2014)*; Indianapolis Colts (2014)*
- * Offseason or practice squad member only
- Stats at Pro Football Reference

Davin Meggett (born March 22, 1990) is an American former football player. Meggett spent only three seasons in the National Football League (NFL) as a reservist or practice squad member. He played college football for the University of Maryland.

== Early life ==
Meggett was born in Clinton, Maryland, on March 22, 1990, to Super Bowl champion and two-time Pro Bowl selection Dave Meggett and mother Victoria Davis. He grew up in Upper Marlboro, Maryland, with his mother and stepfather John Davis. At the age of 9, Meggett switched from his preferred sport of soccer to football because his childhood friend played the game. Meggett, however, was doubtful that he was of large enough stature to play intercollegiate football for a major college program.

At Surrattsville High School, Meggett was a three-year starting running back. As a junior in 2006, he ran for 1,150 yards on 156 attempts, rushed for ten touchdowns, and garnered second-team all-county and honorable mention all-state honors. Meggett experienced a breakout year as a senior in 2007, during which he led the Surratsville Hornets to its first playoff berth since the establishment of the team in 1960. He was an accomplished track runner placing well at the regional tournament and setting several high school weight-lifting records under Coach Richard S. Hensel. He finished the regular season as the second-leading rusher in the Washington, D.C. metropolitan area. On the season, Meggett rushed 169 times for 1,784 yards and scored 26 rushing touchdowns and six receiving touchdowns. Rivals.com named him the 16th-ranked player in the state of Maryland. He was honored as a first-team All-Prince George's County, All-Met, and all-league player. Surrattsville High finished with a 10–2 record and a state playoffs berth. Meggett also ran track in high school and earned a letter all four years. He was honored as all-county and the team's field athlete of the year as a junior.

Meggett was recruited by Notre Dame, Virginia, and Rutgers, but Maryland was the only Division I FBS school to offer him a scholarship. He also received scholarship offers from Division I FCS programs Howard, Old Dominion, and James Madison. Meggett, who grew up a Maryland fan, accepted the school's offer and later said, "This is a dream. Is this really happening? ... I'm going to go ahead, commit and live out a fantasy."

== College career ==
While at the University of Maryland, Meggett studied government and politics. As a true freshman in 2008, he saw action in each game of the season. Short-statured and muscular, his smashmouth rushing style is characterized by achieving yards after contact. In 2008, Meggett recorded 422 rushing yards on 79 attempts with a long of 38 against California, and four touchdowns. After starting tailback Da'Rel Scott suffered a lingering shoulder injury against California game, Meggett gained increased playing time. Offensive coordinator, James Franklin, called the run-intensive, rain-soaked North Carolina match "a Meggett type of game ... Downhill, not a whole lot of dancing." In that game, Meggett made a one-yard rushing touchdown and the 31-yard reception which helped put the Terps within range for the game-winning field goal. Maryland coach Ralph Friedgen said, "He's a freshman, but he doesn't play like a freshman." Against NC State, Meggett had eight carries for 34 yards and a one-yard touchdown run. He replaced Scott after an injury late in the game, and then caught a screen pass for 31 yards to set up the game-winning field goal by kicker Obi Egekeze. Maryland secured bowl eligibility with the 27 24 victory. In the 2008 Humanitarian Bowl against Nevada, he caught a pass for a two-point conversion, and rushed ten times for 35 yards. Alongside leading rusher Scott, Meggett helped Maryland to come the closest it ever has to having both a 1,000- and 500-yard rusher in the same season. Meggett fell just 43 yards shy of the 500-yard mark. He led all Atlantic Coast Conference freshman with 5.13 yards per carry.

In 2009, Meggett entered preseason camp behind Scott and Morgan Green, but his camp performance was impressive enough to garner a share of the number-one position alongside Scott. He saw action in all 12 games including four starts, and recorded 338 yards on 99 carries and six touchdowns.

Meggett and Scott again split time as the number-one back during the 2010 season. Head coach Friedgen said, "At this point in time, I would say Scott and Meggett are 1A and 1B." He saw action in all 13 games and recorded 720 yards on 126 carries and four touchdowns. In the season opener against Navy, Meggett rushed eight times for a career-high 105 yards, including a career-long 67-yard run, and one touchdown. Meggett extended his career-long against Florida International with a 76-yard touchdown run to ensure a Maryland victory. Against Duke, Meggett had 18 carries for 57 yards, including a three-yard touchdown run. Against Wake Forest, Meggett rushed for 94 yards and a touchdown.

Prior to the 2011 season, Meggett was named to the Doak Walker Award watch list. He assumed the starting position after the graduation of Da'Rel Scott and was named a team captain. In the opener against Miami, he had 21 carries for 92 yards.

=== Statistics ===
Maryland		Rushing					Receiving
Season	Games	Att	Yds	Avg	Lg	TD	Rec	Yds	Avg	Lg	TD
2008	13	89	457	5.1	38	4	9	79	8.8	31	0
2009	12	99	338	3.4	13	6	14	175	12.5	67	1
2010	13	126	720	5.7	76	4	6	59	9.8	--	0
2011	12	171	896	5.2	--	4	17	141	8.3	31	1
Total	50	485	2400	4.9	76	18	46	454	9.8	31	2

== Professional career ==
Pre-draft measurables
Height	Weight	Arm length	Hand span	40-yard dash	10-yard split	20-yard split	20-yard shuttle	Three-cone drill	Vertical jump	Broad jump	Bench press
5 ft 8 1/4 in (1.73 m)	211 lb (96 kg)	30 1/8 in (0.77 m)	9 1/2 in (0.24 m)	4.44 s	1.53 s	2.57 s	4.32 s	7.14 s	35.0 in (0.89 m)	9 ft 10 in (3.00 m)	23 reps
All values from NFL Combine/Pro Day

=== Houston Texans ===
Meggett was signed by the Houston Texans as an undrafted free agent to an undisclosed three-year contract on April 29, 2012. He was released on August 26, 2012.

On September 27, the Texans signed Meggett to the practice squad. He was released on November 27.

=== Indianapolis Colts ===
On December 11, 2012, Meggett was signed to the practice squad of the Indianapolis Colts.

On August 25, 2013, he was waived by the Colts.

=== Dallas Cowboys ===
On October 15, 2013, Meggett was signed to the practice squad of the Dallas Cowboys. He was released on October 29.

=== Washington Redskins ===
The Washington Redskins signed Meggett to their practice squad on November 12. He signed a reserve/future contract with the team on December 31, 2013. He was released on March 4, 2014.

=== Second Stint with Colts ===
Meggett re-signed with the Indianapolis Colts on July 27, 2014. He was waived on August 17, 2014.

== Post-football ==
After his football career ended, Meggett became an 8th grade language arts teacher at Sugar Grove Academy in Houston, Texas. He also became the head track, football and wrestling coach at Fulshear high school.
