= Adaora Onyechere =

Nigerian broadcast journalist

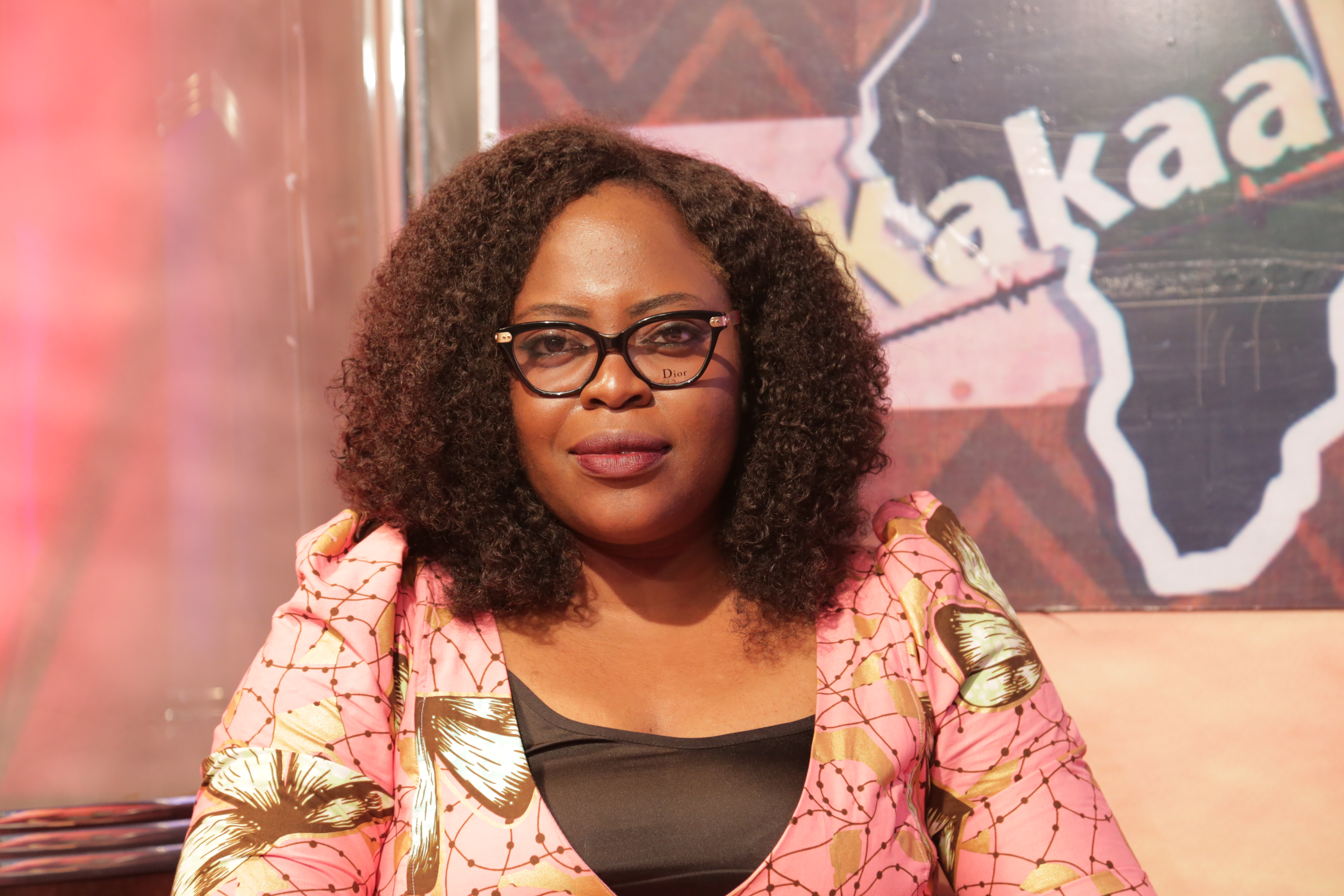
- CEO Wewe Network Afrique
- Born: Okigwe, Imo State
- Education: Irwin College Leicestershire; Coventry University; London Metropolitan University
- Occupations: Entrepreneur; Broadcaster Journalist; Philanthropist; motivational speaker; Author
- Known for: co-anchor of Kakaaki, a daily talk show on Africa Independent Television
- Title: Executive Director of Yellow Jerrycan Save A Child Foundation.; CEO of Signature heels; CEO of WEWE Network Afrique; Host of Talk2Adaora on kiss 99.9 FM

Adaora Onyechere // is a Nigerian broadcast journalist, entrepreneur, motivational speaker, poet and author. She is a former co-anchor of Kakaaki, a daily talk show on Africa Independent Television. She currently hosts her own show, Talk to Adaora commonly known as Talk2Adaora on Kiss 99.9 FM Abuja. She is the founder of WEWE Network Afrique, a Pan-African organization. Talk2Adaora is a project of WEWE Network Afrique. She is also the CEO of Signature Heels Media.

== Early life ==
Born in Nigeria to parents who are natives of Okigwe, a local government area of Imo State in the southeastern region of Nigeria, Adaora Onyechere is the first child of six children. Her parents wanted her to be a lawyer, but she studied English language and broadcasting. Onyechere speaks Igbo, Swahili, French and basic Spanish.

== Education ==
She had her primary school education at Starland Private School, Lagos State, southwest Nigeria where she completed her First School Leaving Certificate (FSLC), then she had her Secondary school education at Owerri Girls Secondary School. She completed her A Level education at IRWIN College, England then subsequently obtained a diploma in Law at Coventry University before she graduated from London Metropolitan University after studying English Broadcasting. Onyechere also holds a master's degree in creative writing after graduating from Oxford Brooks University. She is also certified in BSL level 2 (Sign Language) and PMP Certification in Project Management. She is also a seasoned abstract Art painter.

== Career ==
Prior to moving back into Nigeria in 2009, Onyechere wrote for Worldview Magazine London, a student-based magazine back in the U.K. She started broadcasting as a student in Coventry at Coventry Student Radio, then went ahead to work for Channel 4 in London. She also worked at BEN Television London as the Editor and Anchor for 'African Film Review'.

She had her first broadcasting stint in Nigeria as a radio presenter with Confluence Cable Network Limited, a broadcast media house in Kogi State before working for Federal Radio Corporation of Nigeria, Vision FM and DAAR Communications, a media company that houses Africa Independent Television, where she worked as a presenter till August 2018 after which she was nominated by a party called Action Alliance where she contested an election to represent her constituency in the Imo State House of Assembly. She lost to the APGA candidate. She was appointed the Special Assistant to the Governor on Information and Advocacy by the Governor Chukwuemeka Ihedioha.

Onyechere currently hosts her talk show on Kiss 99.9 FM, called "Talk2Adaora", the show looks at social issues in society and the gap between policymakers and citizens. She voiced a call of action for Nigerian politicians and state actors to eradicate all forms of stereotyping and negative gender identities against women. She ventured into politics to bridge the gap between leadership and the led. Her book's intent is to challenge and transform the distorted and negative gender identities. It also profiles women who have made significant strides in their fields.

== Publications ==
Apart from broadcasting, Onyechere is a motivational book author. Some of her published books include:

- Poetry for Life
- Black Girl With A White Heart
- Women In The World
- Politics, X and Power

She is also a motivational speaker and poet. Some of her published Spoken Words Include:

- Arise
- Fear
- the spoken word album Change Smitten, an 8 track spoken word compilation.

== Personal life ==
She never thought she will be on tv speaking because she has speech defect growing up. She did a project on Caribbean Culture and the use of Cannabis just to enable her speak.

Onyechere is the initiator of several non-governmental organizations including the "Yellow jerry can Save-A-Child Lend-A-Hand" project, a foundation that focuses on the welfare of children and women who have been victims of insurgencies and "International Rise Up Against Rape", an initiative against child abuse and rape. In 2018, she and her foundation led a campaign against child mortality. She also started a 5-man band called Oasis while at London Metropolitan University and was the lead singer and violinist. She was honored in the category of 20 most influential media women award at the International women power conference Africa. She is also the Executive Director of gender strategy advancement. She is a single mother to a son.

== See also ==
- List of Igbo people
- List of Nigerian media personalities
