= Tomike Adeoye =

Nigerian media personality

- Born: Tomike Adeoye; August 24, 1995 (age 31); Lagos, Lagos State, Nigeria
- Other name: Olori Ebi
- Citizenship: Nigerian
- Education: University of Lagos (B.Sc in Microbiology)
- Years active: 2015–present
- Children: 2

Tomike Adeoye (born 24 August 1995; née Aleyande), also known as Olori Ebi, is a Nigerian media personality, influencer and actress. She began her career in radio and television, later venturing into acting, with her debut in the Nigerian television series Jenifa's Diary. She subsequently appeared in productions including Industreet, Phases, Ègún, and Àjosepo. In 2024, she was one of the highest grossing lead actresses in Nigeria.

Known for her energetic and dramatic behavior, she is one of the most popular female influencers in Nigeria. In March 2025, she was appointed the MD of LightHill Studio.

== Early life ==
Tomike Adeoye was born on 24 August 1995 in Lagos, Nigeria, in a Yoruba Christian household. She completed her primary and secondary education in Ibadan, Oyo State. She studied Microbiology at the University of Lagos, graduating in 2017.

== Career ==
Tomike began her media career while studying at the University of Lagos and subsequently worked as a television and radio presenter with 103.1 UnilagFM.

She made her acting debut in 2015 as Tania in Jenifa's Diary, a television series produced by Funke Akindele. She subsequently appeared in Industreet, a musical drama series, where she played Ada. Later, she took on roles in productions including Phases and Ègún, while continuing to work across television, digital media and entertainment.

In 2016, she participated in ''Moments Z'', a television competition on EbonyLife TV, where she worked as a celebrity tracker. She later became a red-carpet host for EbonyLife TV's ''VVIP Events'', including the premieres of The Royal Hibiscus Hotel, Chief Daddy and Your Excellency. In 2017, Tomike also became a presenter on ''Groove On'', an entertainment programme on Silverbird Television. On 14 August 2020, she hosted the fourth season of Real Talk, a talk-show programme produced by Ndani TV.

In 2024, Tomike played one of the lead roles in Àjosepo, a comedy-drama directed by Kayode Kasum. She portrayed Tani opposite Mike Afolarin, who played Dapo. The film also featured Timini Egbuson, Mercy Aigbe, Bisola Aiyeola, Deyemi Okanlawon, Ronke Oshodi Oke and Muyiwa Ademola. Àjosepo became a commercial success at the Nigerian box office, grossing approximately ₦257 million. In FilmOne's 2024 ranking of the highest-grossing lead actresses, Adeoye ranked fourth for her performance in Àjosepo, behind Funke Akindele, Wunmi Toriola and Toyin Abraham.

A central part of Tomike's digital identity is her relationship with her community. She refers to her audience as “Family Members” and in turn was nicknamed Olori Ebi, a Yoruba expression meaning “head of the family.” In November, she organizes an annual cultural event known as Party with Olori Ebi to celebrate her community. Tomike has served as a brand ambassador and influencer for several companies, including Maltina, Indomie, Nestlé Pure Life and Joy Soap among others. In 2021, Tomike was selected for the Inauguaral African YouTube Black Voices Creator Class alongside Fireboy DML, Sho Madjozi, Dinma Umeh and Sauti Sol amongst others.

== Filmography ==
Film/Television
Year	Title	Ref
2015	Jenifa's Diary	
2017	All of Us	
	Industreet	
2019	Phases	
2023	Ègún	
2024	Àjosepò	
	A Heart on the Line	
	Mistakenly Yours	
2026	Àjosepò: The Gathering	
	Okanjunwa	

== Awards and nominations ==
Year	Award	Category	Result	Ref
2018	The Future Awards Africa	Prize for On-Air Personality (TV)	Nominated	
2019	ELOY Awards	TV Personality	Nominated	
2020	ELOY Awards	Award for Influence	Nominated	
2021	GAGE Awards	Influencer of the Year	Nominated	
2021	Pulse Influencer Awards	Influencer of the Year	Won	
2025	Trendupp Awards	The Force of Instagram	Won	
2025	The Future Awards Africa	Prize for Entrepreneurship	Won	

== Personal life ==
Tomike married Tosin Adeoye in April 2019. The couple have two children. Their first child, a daughter named Oluwatomike, was born in July 2021, followed by a son, Oluwatofarati, who was born in March 2023..

Tomike has spoken publicly about motherhood and the challenges of balancing parenting with her career in media. In interviews, she has discussed the transition into motherhood and the effect of pregnancy and parenting on her professional life. She has also spoken about the role of her husband and family in supporting her after becoming a mother.

== Philanthropy ==
In 2020, Tomike launched The Tomike Adeoye Foundation, which has carried out several philanthropic activities in Nigeria with focus on women and girls. Later, the foundation started a program that provides full sponsorship for less privileged children. In March 2026, the foundation partnered with the Lagos Food Bank Initiative to support widows in underserved communities.
