= Nani Boi =

Nigerian writer

Nnaemeka Charles Eze
- Born: March 23, 1983 (age 43); Nsukka, Enugu State
- Education: University of Nigeria Nsukka
- Occupations: Screenwriter, author, Actor
- Spouse: Uloma Eze
- Writing career
- Period: 2008-Present
- Genre: children's fiction

Nani Boi (born Nnaemeka Charles Eze, 23 March 1983) is a Nigerian screenwriter and author of children's books.

== Early life and education ==
Nani Boi, an Igbo, was born in Nsukka, Enugu State. He is a native of Orba in Udenu Local Government area, Enugu State, Nigeria. He is a Geology graduate from University of Nigeria Nsukka.

== Career ==
Nani is diverse in the Nigerian Entertainment Industry He has written a lot of books, one of which includes his early work Mummy Why which he later adapted to a film featuring Pete Edochie, Ernest Obi, Uloma Eze etc. in 2016. He is married to Actress Uloma Eze. He has had a few stints as a musician, featuring artists like Mr Raw, Kcee, Dekumzy He is also a part-time Radio Presenter at Dream 92.5FM Enugu where he has his own program titled #Ogabugaa.

== Bibliography ==
- Mummy Why. El 'Demak Publishers, 2008. ISBN 978-9-788-14326-0
- The Twins. Nani Boi Productions, 2008. ISBN 978-9-782-47311-0
- Young Talents. El 'Demak Publishers, 2008. ISBN 978-9-788-14329-1
- Son of The Soil. El 'Demak Publishers, 2008. ISBN 978-9-788-14330-7
- The Rich Girl and The Poor Boy. El 'Demal Publishers, 2008. ISBN 978-9-788-14322-2
- Victims of Hunger. El 'Demak Publishers, 2008. ISBN 978-9-788-14321-5

== Filmography ==
=== Film ===
Year	Film				
Year	Film	Actor	Writer	Producer	Notes
2016	Mummy Why	Yes	Yes	Yes	Film adaptation of the book
2018	Lionheart (2018 film)	Yes	No	No	(Driver) Peace Mass Transit
2019	Wrong Initiation	Yes	Yes	Yes	Co-Director with Saint-Do featuring Jude Thomas Dawam
2023	Bleeding Butterfly	No	Yes	Yes	
