= Silverbird Cinema =

Silverbird Cinema may refer to:

- Silverbird Cinema (Port Harcourt), Nigeria
- Silverbird Cinema (Uyo), Nigeria
