= Hamza Idris =

Nigerian Journalist

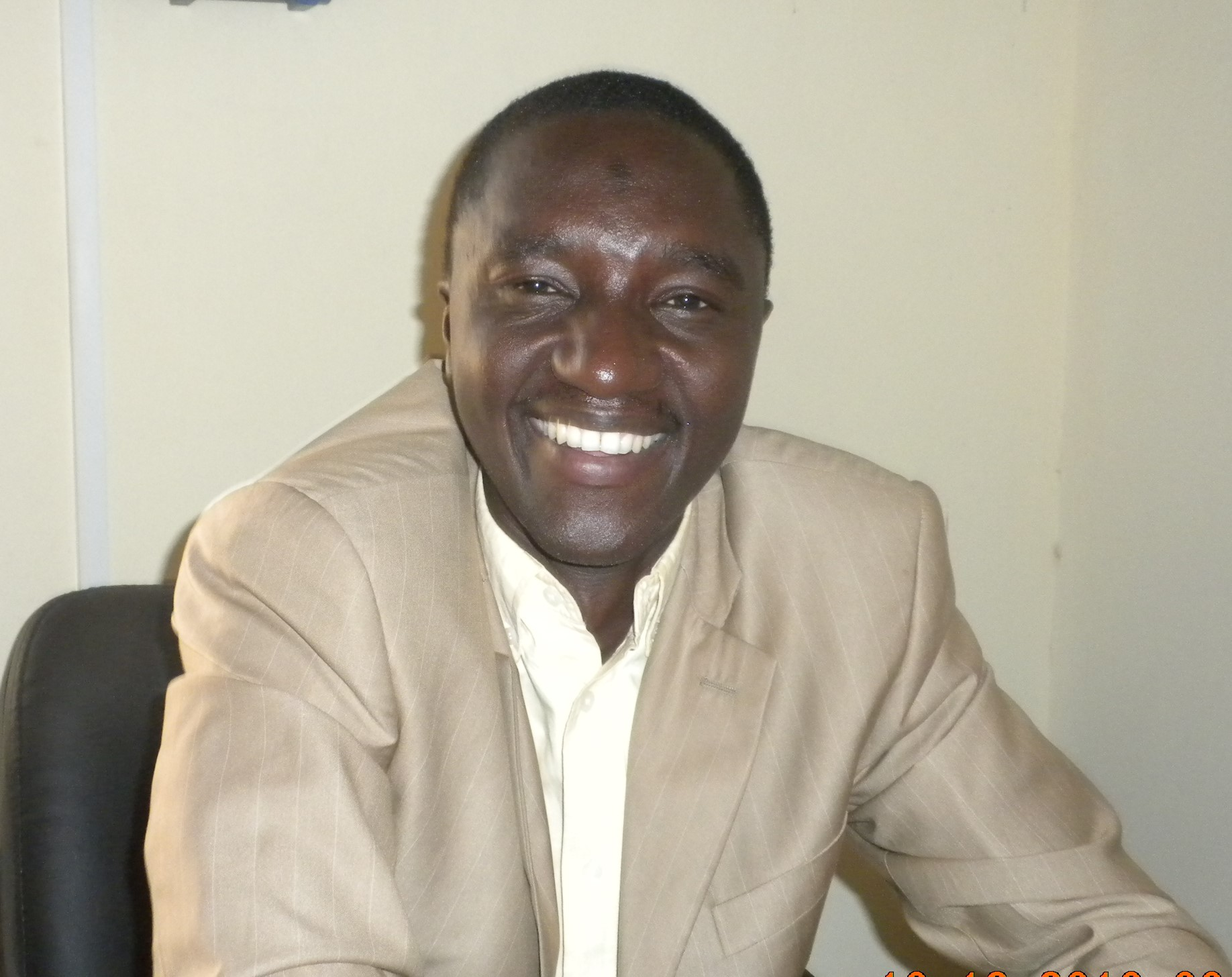
- Born: 27 July 1972 (age 54); Jos, Plateau State
- Education: University of Maiduguri
- Occupation: Journalist
- Organization(s): Media Trust, Publishers of Daily Trust Newspapers
- Title: Acting Editor-In-Chief Daily Trust Newspapers

Hamza Idris (born 27 July 1972) is a Nigerian journalist and communications expert who currently serves as the Acting Editor-In-Chief of the Dailytrust Newspaper. He was born in Jos, Plateau State, although his parents originally hail from Mai'adua Local Government Area of Katsina State.

He is a Fellow of the International Centre for Journalists (ICFJ) who participated in the maiden edition of the United States’ Exchange Programme for Media Professionals from Africa in 2013. He is an author, an alumnus of the Professional Fellows Programme and participant of the Peace Mediation Course (Switzerland, 2015).

Drawing on his extensive academic background and experience in mass communication, Hamza has established himself in the media industry. His leadership at Dailytrust Newspaper as Acting Editor-In-Chief marks a significant milestone in his career, reflecting his commitment to journalistic excellence and innovative communication.

== Early life and education ==
Hamza was born in Jos, Plateau State, on 27 July 1972, although his parents were originally from Mai'adua Local LGovernment of Katsina State.

Hamza began his formal education at St. Theresa's Boys School in Jos, Plateau State, where he attended between 1978 and 1984. He furthered his studies at Teachers’ College Toro in Bauchi State from 1984 to 1990, earning the Grade II Teachers Certificate. In 1995, he obtained a Diploma in Accounting from the University of Jos. His passion for media and communications led him to pursue higher education in the field, culminating in a Bachelor of Arts (BA) Degree in Mass Communication from the University of Maiduguri in 2002, and later a Master of Science (MSc) Degree in Mass Communications from the National Open University of Nigeria in 2019.

== Career ==
Hamza joined the Media Trust Limited, publishers of Daily Trust titles in 2005, and reported from Adamawa, Yobe and Borno states, respectively. He was a reporter, correspondent, Acting Bureau Chief and Bureau Chief; Group Politics Editor, General Editor, Deputy Editor-In-Chief and now Acting Editor-in-Chief of the newspaper.

While reporting from the North East, Hamza also served as the Editor of Kanem Trust, an 8-page community news pull-out that covered the North Eastern states of Nigeria.

In 2015, he was redeployed to the newspaper's headquarters in Abuja Nigeria as Group Politics Editor. He was appointed Editor of the paper on September 4, 2019. On November 9, 2020, he was appointed as pioneer Editor of the three titles: Daily Trust, Daily Trust Saturday and Daily Trust on Sunday.

Hamza serves as a member of the Editorial Bord of the Daily Trust's between 2015 and October 2024. He was appointed as Deputy Editor-In-Chief of Daily Trust newspaper and chairman of its editorial board. The appointment was announced by the chief executive officer and Editor-in-Chief (Print) of Media Trust Group, Ahmed I. Shekarau, after the approval of the appointment by the company's board of directors at its 90th meeting held on September 17 and 18, 2024. He also sat on the editorial board of Pittsburgh Post-Gazette, USA, as an intern in 2013.

Hamza has written over 6,000 news stories and features on security especially the Boko haram insurgency, political, social and economic issues in Nigeria, Africa and the world that were published in the Daily Trust titles. Some of the write-ups have been culled by international journals and serve as reference for undergraduate and postgraduate students.

He was one of the targets of Nigerian military crackdown on journalists when armed soldiers stormed the Daily Trust newspaper's headquarters in Abuja.

== Publications ==
Hamza has co-authored a chapter in the following published works:

- Multiculturalism, Diversity and Reporting Conflict in Nigeria, Evans Brothers (Nigeria Publishers) Limited, edited by Professor Umaru A. Pate and Professor Lai Oso (2017).
- Assault on Journalism, edited by Ulla Carlsson and Reeta Poythari, Nordicom, University of Gothenburg, Sweden (2017).
- Nigeria: Hearts and Minds. A contribution to the ZAM//African Investigative Publishing Collective (AIPC) Transnational Investigation. ZAM Magazine, Chronicle 17, December 2015, Amsterdam, the Netherlands.

== Awards ==
Hamza won the Editor of the Year award at the 30th edition of the Nigerian Media Merit Award (NMMA) 2022. He defeated other nominees to clinch the award. The ceremony was held at Eko Hotel in lagos, Nigeria.

== See also ==
- List of Nigerian media personalities
