= Andre Blaze =

Nigerian radio personality, rapper, television host and executive producer

- Born: Andre Henshaw; 14 August 1983 (age 42); Nigeria
- Occupations: Radio personality; rapper; TV host (Nigezie Xtreme); executive producer
- Years active: 2001–present
- Children: 2
- Relatives: Kate Henshaw (cousin)
- Musical career
- Genres: Hip hop
- Instrument: Vocals
- Label: Tuck Tyght Records

Andre Blaze Henshaw (born 14 August 1983) is a Nigerian radio personality, rapper, television host and executive producer. He first gained notice as a member of the hip hop group Tuck Tyght Allstars. His radio career began at Rhythm 93.7 FM Port Harcourt, where he worked for over six years before joining Nigezie as a TV host. In May 2012, he quit his job at the cable TV channel after four years, later accepting an offer to host Nigeria's Got Talent. Prior to this, he had hosted several other reality television talent shows including True Search, Battle of the Year and Peak Talent Show. He is also an anchor for the Google Digital Skills for Africa Training Programme.

== Early life ==
Blaze was born to a mother from Anambra State and a father from Cross River State. He grew up in both Port Harcourt and Calabar.

== Education ==
Blaze pursued his undergraduate studies in Linguistics and Communication at the University of Port Harcourt, completing a B.Sc. degree in 2006.

== Career ==
=== Music ===
As a rapper, Blaze achieved early notoriety as a member of Port Harcourt-based hip hop group Tuck Tyght.

=== Radio ===
He followed in the footsteps of his mentor Loknan Dombin and began his broadcasting career working for Rhythm 93.7 FM Port Harcourt. While there he held various positions such as head of the Presentation Department, continuity announcer, radio DJ and show host.

=== Television ===
Blaze moved on to television, becoming Nigezie's Top Ten music video countdown anchor. Between 2008 and 2012, he directed an array of successful TV programs in the country. In addition, he hosted shows like True Search, Battle of the Year and Peak Talent Show. In May 2012, Blaze officially quit his job at the cable TV channel. He would later accept an offer to host Nigeria's Got Talent, a reality television show based on the Got Talent series format.

== Personal life ==
Andre Blaze is a cousin of actress Kate Henshaw-Nuttal. He has two children, twin girls by his long-time girlfriend.

== See also ==
- Music of Port Harcourt
- List of people from Port Harcourt
- List of Nigerian media personalities
