= Cupid Stories =

Studio album by Bracket
- Released: 26 September 2011
- Length: 54:53
- Label: Ape Planet
- Producer: Fliptyce; Masterkraft; Dekumzy; Mecca E; Phyno

Bracket chronology
Least Expected (2009)	Cupid Stories (2011)	Alive (2015)

Singles from Cupid Stories
- 1. "Remember (Yori Yori Remix)" Released: 10 June 2010; 2. "Muah Muah" Released: 20 March 2011; 3. "Me & You" Released: 30 May 2011; 4. "Girl" Released: 23 September 2011

Cupid Stories is the third studio album by Nigerian contemporary highlife music duo Bracket. It was released on 26 September 2011 through Ape Planet and features guest appearances from Wizkid, M.I, 2Face Idibia, Banky W. and Flavour. Production was handled by Fliptyce, Masterkraft, Dekumzy, Mecca E and Phyno. Cupid Stories was preceded by the singles "Remember (Yori Yori Remix)", "Muah Muah", "Me & You", and "Girl". It serves as a follow-up to Least Expected (2009).

== Background ==
Bracket originally announced the release of Cupid Stories for 5 September 2011, but it was eventually pushed back to the 26th. Explaining the album's title, Cupid Stories, Vast, a member of Bracket, revealed it was chosen because the album contains "many melodious love songs in it".

== Singles ==
The first single "Remember (Yori Yori Remix)" features 2Face Idibia and was released on 10 June 2010. Produced by Dekumzy, it was originally titled "Remember" and not "Remember (Yori Yori Remix)." A leaked version of the track was mistakenly titled "Yori Yori Remix". The album's second single "Muah Muah" was released on 20 March 2011, produced by Dekumzy. The third single off the album "Me & You" was released on 29 May 2011, also produced by Dekumzy. The fourth and final single "Girl" featuring Wizkid was released on 23 September 2011, which was produced by Masterkraft. The song was nominated for Best Collabo of the Year at the 2012 Nigeria Entertainment Awards.

== Critical reception ==
Professional ratings
Review scores
Source	Rating
Nigerian Entertainment Today	2.5/5 stars

Cupid Stories received generally negative reviews from critics. Ayomide Tayo of Nigerian Entertainment Today described the album as unimaginative and one-dimensional, criticizing its repetitive rhythms, weak lyrics, and lackluster production. While praising collaborations like "Girl" with Wizkid and "Champion" with Banky W., he concluded that "Cupid Stories is a book of forgettable love tales" and rated it 2.5 out of 5. Wilfred Okiche of YNaija described Cupid Stories as a love-themed album with moments of charm but weighed down by inconsistent quality. While praising tracks like "Beautiful Baby" featuring Flavour and "Remember" with 2Face Idibia, he noted the album's weaker songs and concluded, "We will be making room on our playlists for the better melodious tunes on this set while wishing the guys Godspeed in perfecting their sound, but we will not wait around forever." Arinze Obikili, a writer for Jaguda, did a track-by-track review on the album and gave it a 6.5/10.

== Track listing ==
Cupid Stories track listing
No.	Title	Writer(s)	Producer(s)	Length
1.	"Looking At You"	Nwachukwu Ozioko; Obumneme Ali	Mecca E	4:12
2.	"Stagger" (featuring M.I)	Ozioko; Ali; Jude Abaga	Phyno	3:46
3.	"Me & You"	Ozioko; Ali	Dekumzy	3:16
4.	"Girl" (featuring Wizkid)	Ozioko; Ali; Ayodeji Balogun	Masterkraft	4:54
5.	"Tell Me Something"	Ozioko; Ali	Dekumzy	3:17
6.	"Champion" (featuring Banky W.)	Ozioko; Ali; Olubankole Wellington	Masterkraft	3:26
7.	"Bro. Wale"	Ozioko; Ali	Dekumzy	3:24
8.	"Beautiful Baby" (featuring Flavour)	Ozioko; Ali; Chinedu Okoli	Dekumzy	3:46
9.	"Iheoma"	Ozioko; Ali	Phyno	4:31
10.	"Muah Muah"	Ozioko; Ali	Dekumzy	3:24
11.	"Time"	Ozioko; Ali	Fliptyce	4:17
12.	"Desire"	Ozioko; Ali	Dekumzy	4:10
13.	"Remember (Yori Yori Remix)" (featuring 2Face Idibia)	Ozioko; Ali; Innocent Idibia	Dekumzy	4:02
14.	"My God"	Ozioko; Ali	Dekumzy	4:28
Total length:				54:53

== Personnel ==
- Dekumzy — production (tracks 3, 5, 7–8, 10, 12–14)
- Mecca E — production (track 1)
- Phyno — production (tracks 2, 9)
- Masterkraft — production (tracks 4, 6)
- Fliptyce — production (track 11)
- Zeeno Foster - mixing, mastering (tracks, 1–3, 5, 7–14)
- Dr. Drexx — mixing, mastering (tracks 4, 6)

== Release history ==
Release history and formats for Cupid Stories
Region	Date	Format	Label
Various	26 September 2011	CD; digital download	Ape Planet
