= Dekumzy =

Nigerian UK Based record producer and musician

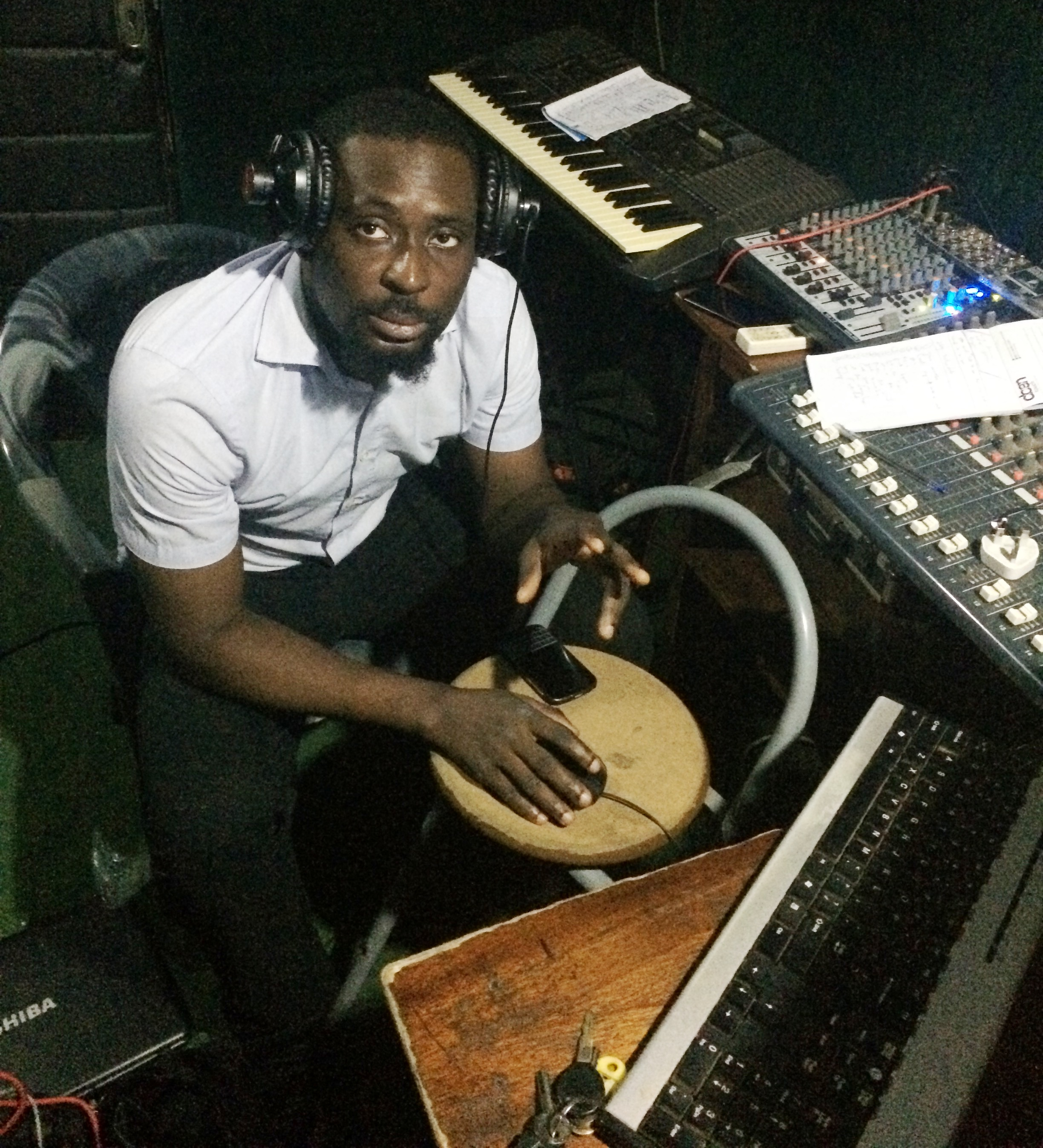

Background information
- Born: Derek Ugochukwu Osonwa; 27 March 1983 (age 43); Enugu
- Genres: Highlife; gospel; soul; R&B
- Occupations: Record producer; musician; composer; band director; pianist; songwriter
- Years active: 2006 -Present
- Label: Dekumzy Multimedia Entertainment
- Website: dekumzy.com

Derek Osonwa, professionally known as Dekumzy, is a Nigerian record producer, musician, composer, pianist, and songwriter. His first major production was the album of the Duo "Resonance" titled "Chinweike" in 2006. Since then he has gone forth to work with the likes of Mr Raw, Flavour N'abania, Bracket, Dr Alban, and Charly Boy among others. His production credits include hits like "Baby Oku" by Flavour N'abania, "Strong and Mighty" by Mr Raw featuring Flavour N'abania, "Carolina Remix" by Dr Alban featuring Charly Boy, "No Time" by Bracket featuring P-Square, "Yori Yori Remix" by Bracket ft 2Baba.

== Early life ==
Dekumzy was born on 27 March 1983 in Enugu, Enugu State, southeastern region of Nigeria. He has family roots in Awka, Anambra State, south-east Nigeria. He became active in music when he joined Federal Ex Students Christian Association (FECA) in the year 2000. He joined the choir at this point and started playing the keyboard. He founded the now defunct Girl Band Trio "Desperate Chicks" namely Stormrex, Ursula Ice and Barbie. One of them "Ursula Ice" eventually became his wife. Stormrex went solo. He has 2 sons

== Career ==
His career highs include the production of the theme song for the Nollywood movie A Million Tears titled "Treasure" featuring Kate Henshaw, the production of the music collaboration between Dr Alban and Charly Boy on the remix of "Carolina" in 2009, and the production of 8 tracks from the second album of Bracket Cupid Stories in 2011. He has had a few stints as an artist which include the tracks "Who get dat thing" featuring Slowdog in 2010 and "Ashawoosa" in 2014.

=== Discography ===
As Producer
Year	Title	Album
2006	"Chinweike" by Resonance	
2007	"Happy Day by " Bracket	Happy Day
2007	"Strong and Mighty" by Mr Raw ft Flavour N'abania	Everything Remains Raw
2007	"Elewukwu" by TJ	
2010	"Carolina Remix" by Dr Alban ft Charly Boy	
2011	"Tell Me Somtin" by Bracket	Cupid Stories
2011	"Beautiful Baby" by Bracket ft Flavour N'abania	Cupid Stories
2011	"Me and U" by Bracket	Cupid Stories
2011	"Bro Wale" by Bracket	Cupid Stories
2011	"Desire" by Bracket	Cupid Stories
2011	"Remember" by Bracket ft 2Baba	Cupid Stories
2011	"My God" by Bracket	Cupid Stories
2011	"Muah Muah" by Bracket	Cupid Stories
2012	"Baby Oku" by Flavour N'abania	Blessed (Flavour N'abania album)
2025	"Trust Nobody" by Becca Diamond	

== As composer ==
=== Selected feature films ===
Year	Title	Notes
2009	"True Story"	
2009	"Millenium Lady"	
2010	"Gazza Treasure"	
2013	"Strength to Strength"	
2013	"Parish House"	
2015	"30 Minutes From Hell"	
2015	"Keziah"	
2016	"Mummy Why"	Directed by Ernest Obi
2016	"Poka Messiah"	Directed by Ernest Obi
2016	"The Storm"	Directed by Ernest Obi
2017	"Delta Blood"	Directed by Ernest Obi
2017	"Adaku The Wicked Soul"	
2017	"Lying Game"	
2017	"Beautiful Rose"	
2017	"Wrath of Ika"	
2019	"Wrong Initiation"	Directed by Nani Boi
2019	"Her Mothers Man"	Directed by Desmond Elliot
2019	"Stolen Crown "	
2019	"Ordinary Fellows"	Directed by Lorenzo Menakaya
