= Silverbird Cinema (Port Harcourt) =

Movie theater in Rivers State, Nigeria

Silverbird Cinemas
- Interactive map of Silverbird Cinemas
- Address: Former Obi Wali Cultural Centre; Diobu, Port Harcourt, Rivers State; Nigeria
- Coordinates: 4.7848573°N 7.0054988°E
- Owner: Silverbird Group
- Capacity: 1000
- Type: Multiplex

Construction
- Opened: April 2009

Silverbird Cinema is a movie theater in Port Harcourt, Rivers State, located at former Obi Wali Cultural Centre, Abonnema Wharf Road. It was opened in April 2009 and is owned and operated by Silverbird Group.

The eight-screen multiplex theater shows both local and foreign films from the most-profitable markets. It has a seating capacity of 1000 and a regular attendance of not less than 500.
