= University of Uyo Teaching Hospital =

Geography
- Location: Uyo, Akwa Ibom State, Southern, Akwa ibom, Nigeria
- Coordinates: 5.011560177141914°N 7.861352460769915°E

Organisation
- Type: Teaching
- Affiliated university: University of Uyo

Services
- Emergency department: Available

History
- Former name: Federal Medical Centre
- Opened: 1999

Links
- Website: https://www.uuthuyo.net/
- Lists: Hospitals in Nigeria

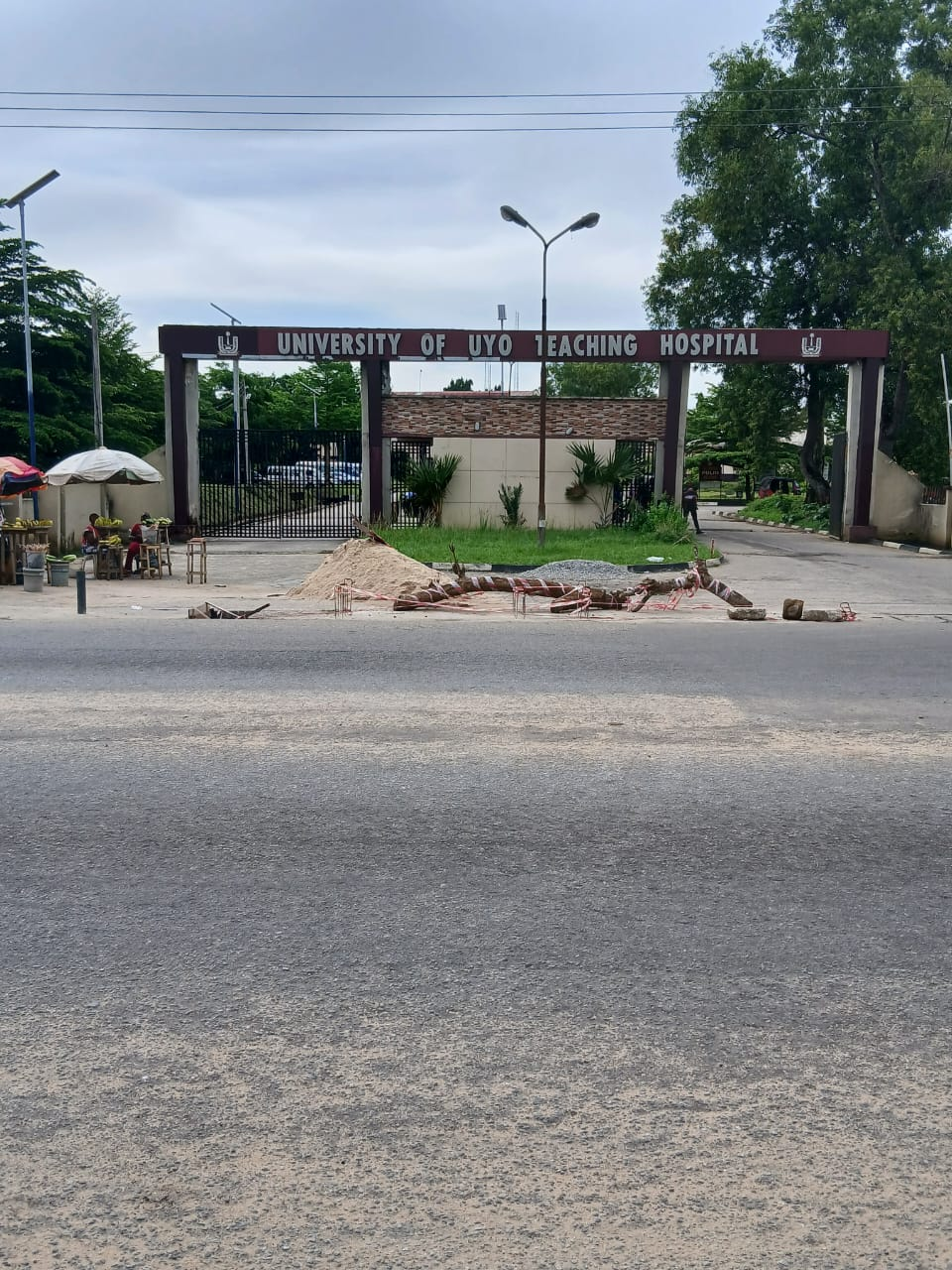
Uniuyo teaching hospital

The University of Uyo Teaching Hospital (UUTH) is a tertiary hospital in Abak road, Uyo, Akwa Ibom State, an administrative division of Nigeria.

== History ==
The hospital started as the Akwa Ibom State Specialist Hospital, formed by the Akwa Ibom State Government in the year 1994 under the administration of Yakubu Balogun. It was later renamed Sani Abacha Specialist Hospital. In 1997, the Federal Government of Nigeria renamed it Federal Medical Centre, Uyo in 1999 before its upgrade to teaching hospital status in 2008. It is affiliated with University of Uyo College of Medicine. There is a library established as an integral part of the teaching hospital for use by medical students and practitioners.

== CMD ==
The current chief medical director of the teaching hospital is Prof. Emem Abasi Bassey. Which he was the former commissioner for health in the state.

== Schools ==
School of Health Information Management, Community Health Officers Training School.

== Services ==
=== Department of Administration ===
- General Administration
- Human Resources
- Planning Research and Statistics
- Clinical Services
- Legal Unit
- Corporate Affairs

=== Clinical ===
- Accidents & Emergency
- Anaesthesia
- Surgery
- Internal Medicine
- Family Medicine
- O & G
- Ophthalmoloy
- Orthopaedics &Traumatology
- Paediatrics
- Pharmacy
- Physiotherapy
- Mental Health
- Radiology
- Research Institute
- Nursing Service

== Commission/Renovation ==
In February 2025, a newly built antenatal complex was commissioned at the teaching hospital by the Imo state governor.

=== Renovation ===
"Nigeria Liquefied Natural Gas (NLNG) Limited, through its Hospital Support Programme (HSP), helped the hospital expand and renovate its emergency unit.
