= Amarachi =

Nigerian singer and dancer (born 2004)

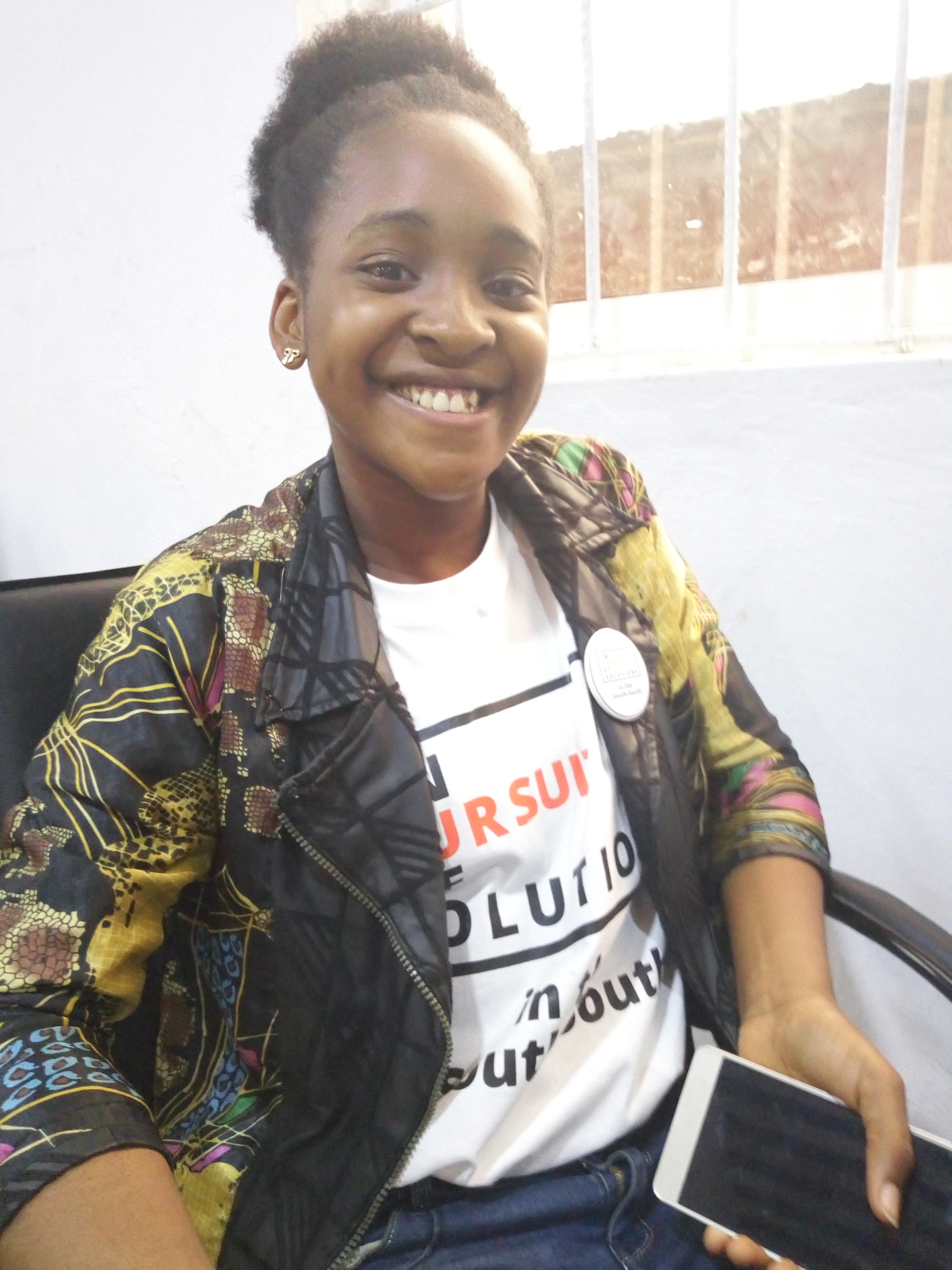
- Amarachi in October 2019

Background information
- Born: Amarachi Uyanne; July 17, 2004 (age 22); Delta State, Nigeria
- Genres: Afropop, hip hop
- Occupations: Dancer, singer
- Instruments: Vocals, violin (from an early age)
- Years active: 2012–present

Amarachi Uyanne (born 17 July 2004), popularly known by her stage name Amarachi, is a Nigerian singer and dancer. She is best known for winning the maiden edition of Nigeria's Got Talent.

== Background ==
Amarachi is a native of Delta State in the South-South region of Nigeria. She grew up in Edo State, South-South Nigeria, where she started dancing at the age of 5. In 2012, she won a cash prize of N10,000,000 after she was announced as the winner of the first edition of Nigeria's Got Talent. She was subsequently dubbed the "youngest millionaire in Nigeria".

== Education ==
She attended University Preparatory Secondary School in Benin City, Edo State and following her graduation in July 2019, pursued tertiary education at from Benson Idahosa University, Benin City, Edo State, Nigeria.

== Career ==
After emerging as the winner of Nigeria's Got Talent, Amarachi released her debut single titled "Amarachi Dance". She proceeded to feature Phyno in a song titled "Ova Sabi"; her first two singles received massive airplays and positive reviews from music critics. She currently runs the Amarachi Talent Academy, a talent school conceived with the aim of nurturing and training young children with musical and dance talents.

== Discography ==
=== Singles ===
- "Amarachi's Dance"
- "Get Down"
- "Ova Sabi" (featuring Phyno)
- "Te Quiero"

== Awards and recognition ==
Year	Award ceremony	Prize	Recipient/Nominated work	Result	Ref
2014	9th Nigeria Music Video Awards	Best Video by a Minor	"Ova Sabi"	Nominated	

== See also ==
- List of Igbo people
- List of Nigerian musicians
