= Nigeria's Got Talent =

Nigerian reality television series

- Genre: Reality
- Created by: Simon Cowell (Got Talent franchise)
- Presented by: Andre Blaze
- Judges: Dan Foster; Kate Henshaw; Yibo Koko
- Countries of origin: Nigeria; United Kingdom
- Original languages: English; Nigerian Pidgin
- No. of series: 2

Production
- Production locations: Various (auditions); Lagos

Original release
- Network: AIT; Nigerian Television Authority
- Release: 16 September 2012

Nigeria's Got Talent is a Nigerian reality talent show that is part of the Got Talent franchise. It was launched in 2012 on television stations like AIT and NTA, and sponsored by thriving telecommunication company Airtel.

Hosted by Andre Blaze former presenter on Nigeria's Got Talent's fore-runner The Peak Talent Show, the judges are actress Kate Henshaw, comedian Yibo Koko, and radio presenter Dan Foster, who had previously held a similar position on Idols West Africa.

The current champions are dancing duo Robots for Christ.

== Format ==
The auditions take place in front of the judges and a live audience in different Nigerian cities. As the contestant performs, each judge may show their disapproval by pressing a buzzer that lights a red 'X' near above the stage. If all three buzzers are pressed, the act ends immediately. To advance to the second round, auditionees must receive at least two 'yes's' or the competition ends for them. After the auditions, the judges have to whittle successful acts down to fifty, and all performers are called back to discover if they have progressed to the next round.

The remaining acts from across the country perform at the live semi-finals, with the two most popular acts from each semi-final winning a position in the final, and judges may still end a performance early with all three 'X's' buzzed. After the acts have been performed, phone lines open and the voting process begins, after which the votes are counted and the act with the highest number of public votes is automatically placed in the final. The judges then choose between the second and third most popular acts, with the winner of the most votes automatically gaining a place in the final where the winner of Nigeria's Got Talent is chosen once again by the public vote and will receive 10 million dollars

Throughout the whole competition, the judges express their views on each act's performance.

The golden buzzer is not seen in this version so all act must make though If they receive two yes and progressed to the semi-finals they can't automatically go through to the semi-finals

== Season 1 ==
Auditions were held in Abuja, Calabar, Benin, Port Harcourt, Ibadan, Enugu, and Lagos where the grand finale was held. As with the British and American versions of the show, applicants were invited to upload video performances onto the show's website which were viewed by producers, and outstanding contestants were called to perform in front of the judges at the main auditions.

The top ten finalists were:

Name	Act	Occupation	Audition city	Position
Amarachi Uyanne	Dancer/Violinist	Pupil	Benin	Winner
Boniface Ukeme	Dancer	Student	Port Harcourt	
Chuka Solace	Rapper	Student	Lagos	
Dr. Bariyu	Ventriloquist	Medical doctor	Lagos	
Godwin Stringz	Violinist	Student	Benin	First runner up
Impulse	A cappella group	Students	Port Harcourt	
DJ Mouth	Beat boxer	Student	Port Harcourt	
Jesse and ED	Ballet duo	Pupils	Benin	
Toke	Singer	Pupil	Ibadan	
Xpendables	Street dance group	Students	Port Harcourt	

== Season 2 ==
The second series of the show was aired on 8 November 2013, with all three judges returning. After rigorous auditions across the cities in Nigeria, it concluded on 8 February 2014 with Robots for Christ winning the second season. The highlights of the finale was posted to YouTube on 9 February 2014.

== Criticism ==
Although Henshaw had been promoted as the show's mean judge à la Simon Cowell, she has been criticised for going too far. At Season Two's Port Harcourt auditions, she interrupted a singer credited as Heaven by stating, "There is no heaven here. Stop singing and get off the stage, or else I will leave to call your father as the judge".

== See also ==
- East Africa's Got Talent
- Nigerian Idol
- The Voice Nigeria
