= Jimitota Onoyume =

Nigerian journalist

Jimitota Onoyume is a prominent Nigerian journalist who is currently the Vanguard newspaper correspondent in Rivers State. A resident of Port Harcourt, Onoyume's reports are mostly major news and exclusive storylines.

== Personal life ==
=== Family abduction ===
On 12 November 2012, Marian, the teacher wife of Onoyume and her two children were kidnapped by gunmen in Ethiope-East. A sum of N10 million was demanded, although Onoyume managed to negotiate down the amount. On 15 November, Marian and her two young daughters were reportedly released unharmed following a ransom payment made by her husband.

== See also ==
- List of people from Port Harcourt
