= Rhythm 93.7 FM Port Harcourt =

Rhythm 93.7 FM
- Port Harcourt; Nigeria
- Broadcast area: Port Harcourt, Owerri, Aba
- Frequency: 93.7 MHz

Programming
- Language: English
- Format: Urban contemporary

Ownership
- Owner: SilverBird Communications
- Sister stations: Rhythm 95.7 FM Awka, Rhythm 93.7 FM Benin, Rhythm 93.7 FM Lagos

History
- First air date: 10 November 2002

Technical information
- Transmitter coordinates: 4°46′47″N 7°0′31″E

Rhythm 93.7 FM is a commercial radio station located in the Old GRA neighborhood of Port Harcourt, Rivers State. The station broadcasts an urban contemporary radio format, playing a variety of music genres including R&B, hip hop, with occasional electronic dance music and reggae. It is owned and operated by Silverbird Communications under the Silverbird Group company and is one of the most popular private radio stations in the south of Nigeria.

== Line-up ==
Show	Time
Afternoon Drive	Monday – Friday 2:00 PM – 4:00 PM
Dance Party	Monday – Friday (excluding Thursday) 7:30 PM – 10:00 PM
Gospel Vibes	Sundays 8:00 AM – 10:00 AM
Late Night Caller	Tuesdays 10:00 PM – 12 AM
Lunch Box Oldies	Monday – Sunday 12:15 PM – 2:00 PM
Mo Fire	Wednesdays 8:00 PM – 10:00 PM
Morning Drive	Monday – Friday 6:00 AM – 10:00 AM
Rap Culture	Saturdays 6:30 PM – 8:00 PM
Rhythm & Soul	Monday – Friday 10:00 AM – 12:00 PM
Rhythm of the Night	Mondays 10:00 PM – 12:00 AM
Shoutout Show	Saturdays 2:00 PM – 4:00 PM
Sunday at the Rhythm	Sundays 2:00 PM – 4:00 PM
View Point	Saturdays 8:00 AM – 9:15 AM
The TGIF Chart	Fridays 9:00 PM – 10:00 PM

== Staff ==
=== Disc Jockeys ===
- DJ Best
- DJ DoubleD
- DJ Golden
- DJ Stonebridge

=== Presenters ===
- Azubuike Wokocha
- Stephanie Obuzo
- Charlse Baridam
- Ben Wakama

=== Notable former on-air staff ===
- Andre Blaze, currently works at The Virtuoso Company
- Ifeoma Iphie Aggrey-Fynn (died 2015)
- Cleopatra Tawo, now with Planet FM 101.1 in Uyo

== Incidents ==
=== Legal issues ===
On 19 December 2005, two of the station's radio hosts Klem Ofuokwu and Cleopatra Tawo were arrested and charged with giving false news report of a Bridge Failure. They were detained for two weeks and then released on bail.

== See also ==
- Music of Port Harcourt
- List of radio stations in Port Harcourt
