= Mozez Praiz =

Nigerian model and broadcaster

- Born: Mozez Praiz; Lagos, Nigeria
- Education: The Polytechnic, Ibadan
- Presenting career
- Show: Africa Sport On
- Station: SuperSport
- Network: DStv
- Time slot: 7:30pm-8:30pm, Thursdays
- Show: Star Football SuperFans
- Station: Africa Independent Television
- Network: Daar Communications
- Style: Anchor
- Country: Nigeria; South Africa

Mozez Praiz is a Nigerian model and a sports TV/radio presenter who currently works under SuperSport and Smooth F.M 98.1. Best known to be the host of Star Football Superfans Show and the anchor of Naija Made, Mozez has covered several sporting events including the 2010 Africa Cup of Nations in Angola and the 2010 FIFA World Cup in South Africa.

Mozez Praiz stars alongside Neil Andrews, Chisom Mbonu-Ezeoke, Wofai Fada, and Chuey Chu on Most Valuable Picks, the continent’s top sports betting show, airing on SuperSport.

== Early life and education ==
Mozez was born into a family of nine in Lagos State, South-Western Nigeria, where he had his primary and secondary school education. He proceeded to The Polytechnic, Ibadan where he graduated with a National Diploma in Mass Communication; and later studied Cinematography, Editing and set design at the Independent Television Producers Association of Nigeria training school in 2001.

== Career ==
=== Modelling ===
Prior to being employed by Supersport, Mozez was an active model. He commercially modelled for some reputable fashion houses in Nigeria including Modella where he worked for two years before he moved to South Africa.

=== Supersport ===
Mozez is one of the pioneering members of Supersport in Nigeria. He was employed as Production Coordinator in 2007 into the company through the help of the head of production crew of a reality T.V show he took part in, in 2004. He currently anchors Naija Made, a DStv sports programme focused on the Nigeria Premier League.

== Personal life ==
Mozez is married to his wife with whom they have two children. He is also a brand ambassador for MUDI Africa.
