= Bracket (duo) =

Nigerian afropop and R&B duo

- Also known as: Vast & Smash
- Born: Nwachukwu Ozioko; Obumneme Ali
- Genres: R&B, Afropop
- Instrument: Vocals
- Years active: 1999–present
- Label: Bracket Records

Bracket are a Nigerian afropop and R&B music duo composed of Obumneme Ali a.k.a. "Smash" and Nwachukwu Ozioko a.k.a. "Vast". Bracket started as a three-man music group before a member called Bistop dropped out. The duo is currently signed to Bracket Records. It is best known for releasing hit singles like "Happy Day", "Me & U", "Yori Yori", "Ada Owerri", "Mama Africa", and "Panya", which received several positive reviews and airplay. Their albums include Least Expected, Cupid Stories, Alive, and Love Letters.

== Background ==
Vast and Smash grew up in Nsukka town, Enugu State, southeastern Nigeria, where they used to attend campus shows while growing up.

== Discography ==
=== Studio albums ===
- Happy Day (2006)
- Least Expected (2009)
- Cupid Stories (2011)
- Alive (2015)
- Love Letters (2022)

== Awards and nominations ==
In 2012, Bracket received an honorary award from the city of Philadelphia at the African American Museum in Philadelphia. Some of their awards include:

Year	Award ceremony	Award description	Result
2012	The Headies	Artiste of the Year	Won
2013	2012 Nigeria Entertainment Awards	Best Indigenous Artist/Group	Nominated
2013	2012 Nigeria Entertainment Awards	Best Collaboration of the Year	Nominated
