= Ifeoma Aggrey-Fynn =

Ghanaian-Nigerian media personality, writer and public speaker

- Born: 8 June 1980
- Died: 2 June 2015 (aged 34); Nigeria
- Cause of death: Murder caused by gunshot wounds
- Other name: Iphie
- Education: Abia State University
- Occupations: Radio and television personality
- Employer: Silverbird Communications

Ifeoma Iphie Aggrey-Fynn (8 June 1980 – 2 June 2015), known to most simply as Iphie, was a Ghanaian-Nigerian media personality, writer and public speaker.

== Early life and education ==
Aggrey-Fynn was born to a Ghanaian father and a Nigerian mother. She was raised and educated in Nigeria. She attended Abia State University, from which she graduated with a degree in Linguistics and Communication.

== Career ==
Aggrey-Fynn's career in broadcasting began as a TV presenter in 2003. After joining Silverbird Communications in 2009, she was transferred to work at Rhythm 95.7 FM and Silverbird Television in Awka. There, she hosted radio and TV shows including Rhythm & Soul, Gospel Vibes and E-Merge before moving to Rhythm 93.7 FM Port Harcourt.

She was also a three-time host of the Miss Niger Delta beauty pageant. Her shows were geared towards helping her listeners deal with some life's challenges

== Death ==
Aggrey-Fynn had gone to visit her parents at Aba in Abia State. She was on her way back to Port Harcourt when the bus she was traveling in was attacked by armed bandits. As the driver was driving, the gunmen opened fire on the vehicle. Aggrey-Fynn was hit by bullets and died of wounds.

Another story maintains that her boyfriend was driving her home on 2 June 2015. She was in Aba to see her parents and siblings. Upon their arrival, the couple was approached by gunmen, who shot at them as the boyfriend tried to speed off. The shooting happened around 7:00 p.m. near Aggrey-Fynn's residence. Her partner was captured by the kidnappers while she lay in a pool of blood. Neighbors who recognized her transported her to a local hospital, where she was declared dead on arrival.

== See also ==
- List of unsolved murders (2000–present)
