= Idols (West African TV series) =

- Created by: Simon Fuller
- Starring: Dede Mabiaku; Abrewa Nana; Dan Foster
- Country of origin: Nigeria

Production
- Running time: Varies

Original release
- Network: M-Net
- Release: 2007

Finalists (With home country and dates of elimination)
Timi Dakolo	Winner
Omawumi Megbele	May 27
Temitayo George	May 21
Eric Arubayi †	May 14
Jerrilyn Mulbah	May 7
Jodie Odiete	April 30
Mercy Nwanko	April 23
Uche Ume	April 16
Joan Ekpai	April 9
Omodele Fatoki	April 2

Idols West Africa is the West African version of the Idol series franchise. Based in Nigeria, it is a talent contest to find a recording artiste, and aired on M-Net in 2007. Like the Pan-Arab entry to the series, the show incorporated countries throughout the West African region.

== Season 1 ==
The show was presented in English, hosted by Mike Majic. The three judges were: Nigerian Dede Mabiaku, Ghanaian Abrewa Nana and American Dan Foster.

=== Themes ===
April 2: My Idol
April 9: Old School
April 16: Current Hits
April 23: 80s & 90s
April 30: African Songs
May 7: My Idols
May 14: Producer's Choice
May 21: Ultimate Wishlist
May 27: Grand Finale

=== Finals elimination chart ===
Stage:		Semi Finals				Finals								
Weeks:		03/04	03/11	03/18	03/25	04/02	04/09	04/16	04/23	04/30	05/07	05/14	05/21	05/27
Place	Contestant	Result												
1	Timi Dakolo	2												Winner
2	Omawumi Megbele	1					Btm3		Btm3			Btm2	Btm2	Runner-up
3	Temitayo George				2						Btm2	Btm3	Elim	
4	Eric Arubayi		2						Btm2	Btm3		Elim		
5	Jerrilyn Mulbah		1				Btm2	Btm2		Btm2	Elim			
6	Jodie Odiete			1				Btm3		Elim				
7	Mercy Nwankwo			2		Btm2			Elim					
8	Uche Ume	Elim			WC			Elim						
9	Joan Ekpai				1		Elim							
10	Omodele Fatoki				WC	Elim								

Legend
Female	Male	Safe	Safe first	Safe second	Wildcard	Eliminated

== Criticism ==
Despite the title, the show was dubbed Nigerian Idol by the public. Most of the finalists - bar Liberian Jerrilyn Mulbar - were Nigerian. Most of the auditions were held in Nigerian cities (Lagos, Calabar and Abuja). Only one West African city outside Nigeria - Accra - hosted them.

Dan Foster was criticized for not showing up at the Ghana auditions. Fellow judge Dede Mabiaku (popularly known as the Nigerian Simon Cowell) also came under fire for his attitude towards an auditionee who had arrived clad in white briefs in a bid to imitate his hero Fela Kuti. Viewers were shocked to hear Mabiaku call the auditionee a liar, and accuse him of being on "some wrong pills". Foster attempted to calm Mabiaku, who continued to yell insults at the auditionee before asking him to leave, without giving the other judges a chance to vote either "Yes" or "No"

The winner of the series, Timi Dakolo, is yet to release his debut album with Sony BMG, as announced by the producers of the show.
