= Silverbird Group =

Multi-media company in Nigeria

- Trade name: Silverbird Group
- Formerly: Siverbird Magazine
- Type: Private
- Industry: Mass media
- Founded: 1980
- Founder: Ben Murray-Bruce
- Headquarters: Victoria Island, Lagos, Lagos State, Nigeria
- Areas served: Nigeria; Kenya; Ghana; South Africa
- Key people: Ben Murray-Bruce (Chairman); Roy Murray-Bruce
- Services: Real estate Entertainment
- Website: www.silverbirdgroup.com

The Silverbird Group is a diversified multi-media company with holdings in Radio, Television, Real Estate, and Cinemas headquartered in Lagos, Nigeria. The company was established in 1980 by Ben Murray-Bruce and counts Silverbird Cinemas and the Most Beautiful Girl in Nigeria (MBGN) and Mr Nigeria pageants amongst its holdings. Its businesses divisions are Silverbird Properties, Silverbird Film Distribution, Silverbird Communications, Silverbird Cinemas, Silverbird Production, and Dream Magic Studios.

In November 2022, the company signed a $145 Million financing deal with the African Export-Import Bank to construct the Ben Murray-Bruce Studios and Film Academy (BMB Studios and Film Academy) in Eko Atlantic City, in what is reported to be West Africa's largest educational and film studio complex.

== History ==
The origins of firm began in June 1980, when Benedict Murray-Bruce, son of a former UAC executive, secured funds from his family to start a music promotion enterprise. The business began during Nigeria's Second Republic and was involved in promotion of American music artists in Nigeria, the firm organized promotions for such bands as The Whispers, Shalamar, Lakeside and Carrie Lucas. The enterprise later delved into a dancing competition. The group later expanded into beauty pageant.

In the 1990s, after the government liberalized the radio air waves, Silverbird established Rhythm 93.7 FM, initially, promoting a less talk more music brand. The radio started with old school jams and later began playing Afro hip hop. Though, Murray-Bruce also wanted a television license, his application was delayed as a result of conflicts with the management of the Nigerian Broadcasting Commission. In 1999, Bruce was appointed director of NTA and was soon able to get approval for Silverbird Television. The television station initially filled programming slots with syndicated foreign shows.

== Silverbird Productions ==
Silverbird Productions is a division of the company that organizes the Most Beautiful Girl in Nigeria pageant which began as Miss Universe Nigeria in 1983 but was later renamed to its present name. This division is also responsible in the organization of the Mr Nigeria pageant.

From 1986 to 1991, Silverbird Productions held the franchise of Miss Intercontinental, organizing the pageant in Nigeria from 1986 to 1991. Between 1991 and 1992, the Nigerian company lost the rights to the pageant to a German company, which moved the competition to Germany, and organized it there until 2003.

== Silverbird Communications ==
The Silverbird Communications comprises the company's radio station Rhythm 93.7 FM and Silverbird Television. Rhythm 93.7 FM Lagos was established in 1997 while Silverbird Television commenced transmission in Lagos in 2003. In 2002, Rhythm 93.7 FM Port Harcourt was established and Silverbird TV was also set up. In 2008 Rhythm 93.7 FM Jos was established to serve as the bedrock of entertainment in the media space on the Plateau

== Silverbird Cinemas ==
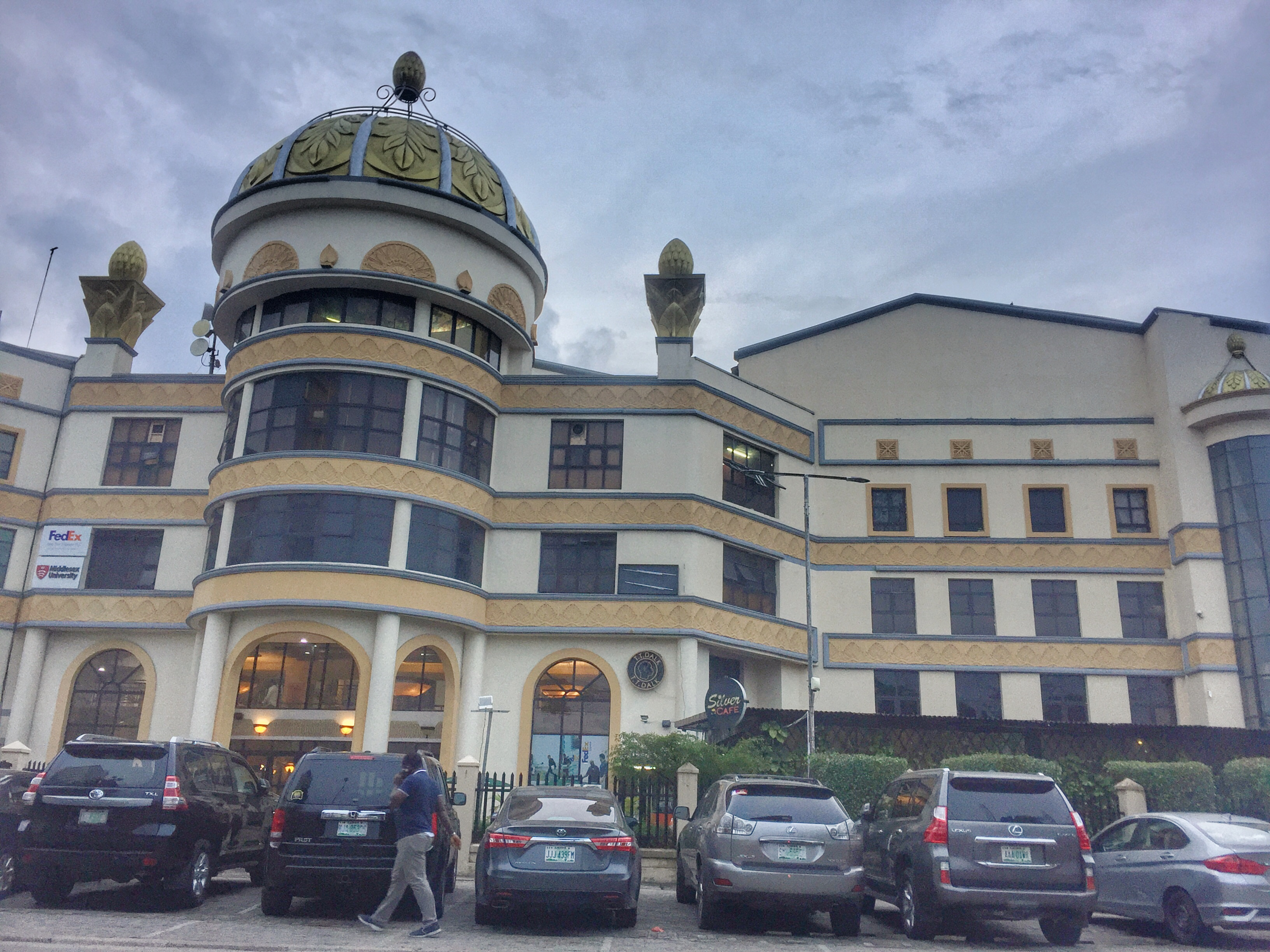
Silverbird cinema building, Victoria Island, Lagos

The Silverbird Cinema is one of the biggest cinema chains in West Africa with 69 screens in branches across Nigeria, Accra and Nairobi.

The first cinema was opened in May 2004 at the Silverbird Galleria in Victoria Island, Lagos. Massive commercial success has given rise to the opening of additional multiplexes in different locations across Nigeria. As of 2016, Silverbird has cinemas in the following cities in Nigeria: Abuja, Lagos, Uyo, Warri and Port Harcourt.

== Silverbird Properties ==
Silverbird Properties is one of the fastest growing divisions of the company. This division is responsible for all real-estate related activities and it currently operates in Bayelsa State and Akwa Ibom State.

== Silverbird Film Distribution ==
This division of the company is responsible for all film distribution activities.

=== Silverbird Mall ===
The Silverbird Mall is located in Victoria Island, Lagos. It consists of the popular Silverbird Galleria.
