= Buchi Emecheta bibliography =

The bibliography of Buchi Emecheta includes plays, autobiographies, poetry and novels by Nigerian author Buchi Emecheta.

== Literature ==
=== Novels ===
- In the Ditch (1972). London: Barrie & Jenkins. Revised edition (1979), London: Allison & Busby, ISBN 9780850312591
- Second Class Citizen (1974). London: Allison and Busby
- The Bride Price (1976). London: Allison & Busby
- The Slave Girl (1977). London: Allison & Busby; winner of the New Statesman's 1978 Jock Campbell Award
- The Joys of Motherhood (1979). London: Allison & Busby
- The Moonlight Bride (1981)
- Destination Biafra (1982). London: Allison & Busby
- Naira Power (1982)
- Adah's Story [In the Ditch/Second-Class Citizen] (1983). London: Allison & Busby
- The Rape of Shavi (1983). New York; George Braziller
- Double Yoke (1982)
- A Kind of Marriage (London: Macmillan, 1986); Pacesetter Novels series.
- Gwendolen (1989). Published in the US as The Family
- Kehinde (1994)
- The New Tribe (2000)

=== Autobiography ===
- Head above Water (1984; 1986)
- "Crossing Boundaries", in Ferdinand Dennis, Naseem Khan (eds), Voices of the Crossing: The Impact of Britain on Writers from Asia, the Caribbean and Africa, London: Serpent's Tail, 1998, p. 93.

=== Children's/Young adults' books ===
- Titch the Cat (illustrated by Thomas Joseph; 1979). London: Allison & Busby
- Nowhere to Play (illustrated by Peter Archer; 1980). London: Allison & Busby
- The Wrestling Match (1981)

=== Plays ===
- Juju Landlord (episode of Crown Court), Granada Television, 1975
- A Kind of Marriage, BBC television, 1976.
- Family Bargain, BBC Television, 1987.

=== Articles and shorter writings ===
- Introduction and comments to Our Own Freedom, photographs by Maggie Murray; 1981
- The Black Scholar, November–December 1985, p. 51.
- "Feminism with a small 'f'!" in Kirsten Holst Petersen (ed.), Criticism and Ideology: Second African Writers' Conference, Stockholm 1988, Uppsala: Scandinanvian Institute of African Studies, 1988, pp. 173–181.
- Essence magazine, August 1990, p. 50.
- The New York Times Book Review, 29 April 1990.
- Publishers Weekly, 16 February 1990, p. 73; reprinted 7 February 1994, p. 84.
- World Literature Today, Autumn 1994, p. 867.
