= Victor Ehikhamenor =

Nigerian visual artist

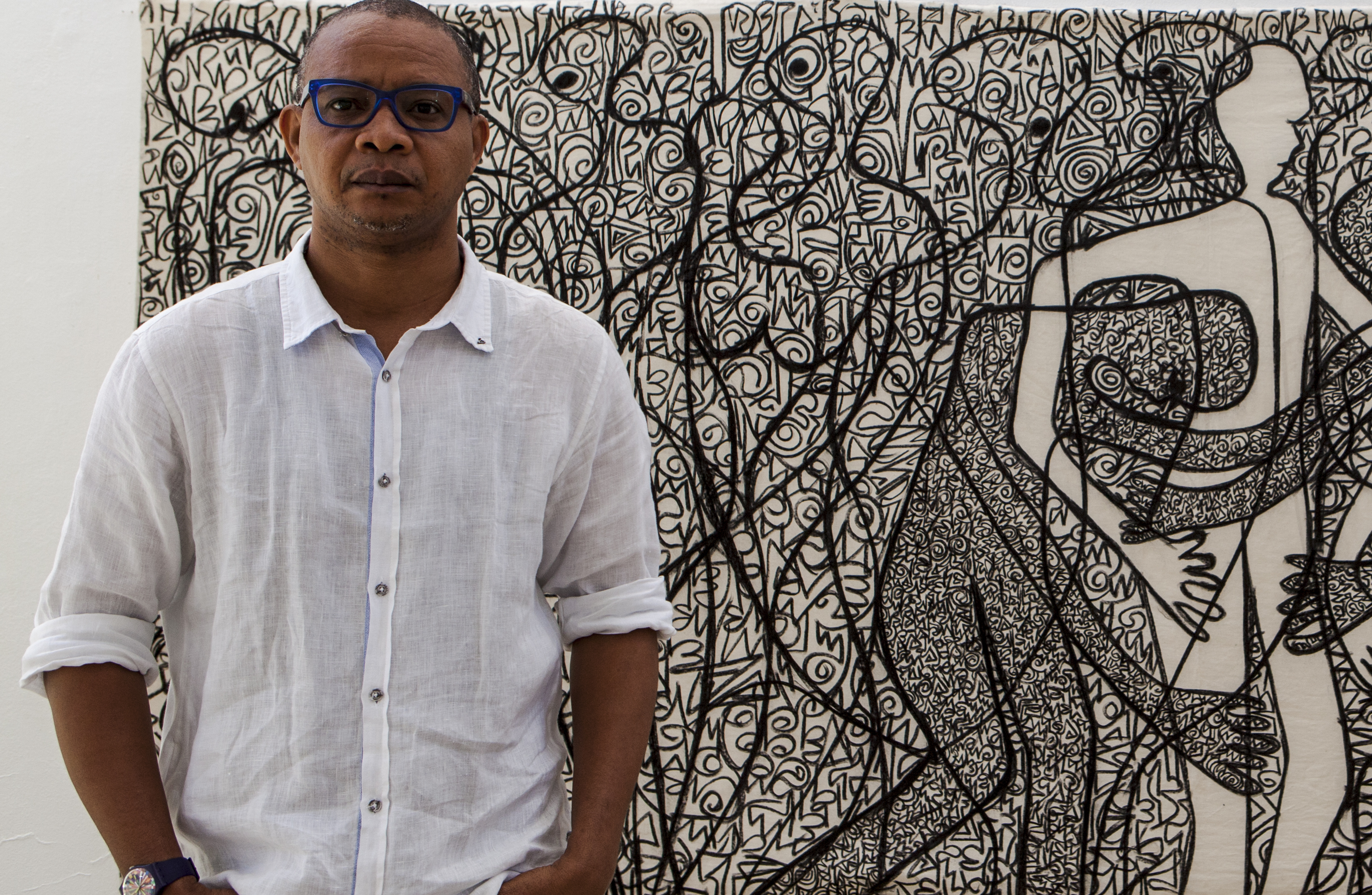
- Born: Udomi-Uwessan, Edo State, Nigeria
- Education: Ambrose Ali University, University of Maryland
- Occupations: Visual artist, writer, photographer
- Website: www.victorehi.com

Victor Ehikhamenor (born 1970 in Udomi-Uwessan, Edo State) is a Nigerian visual artist, writer, and photographer known for his expansive works that engage with multinational cultural heritage and postcolonial socioeconomics of contemporary black lives. In 2017, he was selected (along with two other artists) to represent Nigeria at the Venice Biennale, the first time Nigeria would be represented in the event. His work has been described as representing "a symbol of resistance" to colonialism.

== Early life and education ==
Ehikhamenor was born in Udomi-Uwessan, Edo State, Nigeria, part of the ancient Benin Kingdom, known for its historical bronze-casting tradition. He was educated in Nigeria and in the United States. He returned from the United States in 2008 to work in Lagos.

His grandmother was a cloth weaver, his uncle a photographer, his maternal grandfather a blacksmith, and his mother a local artist.

== Art and writing ==
His work is strongly influenced by work done by villagers especially his grandmother. He credits this traditional upbringing as the foundational tenet of his inspiration; from grandmothers weaving cloth with locally dyed thread in her min-loom to observing his mother's meticulous painting/decorating with homemade clay and charcoal pigments, to watching other villagers mark-making on ancient shrine walls and altars. This has been an enduring feature of his work, which is abstract, symbolic and politically motivated; and influenced by the duality of African traditional religion and the interception of Western beliefs, memories and nostalgia.

Ehikhamenor has held numerous solo art exhibitions across the world. In 2016, he was one of 11 Nigerian artists invited to join 23 Indonesian artists in the grand exhibition at the Biennale. At the Jogja National Museum, he showed an installation titled "The Wealth of Nations". Ehikhamenor was invited to Art Dubai in March 2018. In July 2018, he was also one of the Nigerian artists selected to meet and exhibit work for visiting French President Emmanuel Macron. The exhibition, organised by ART X Lagos took place at the Afrika Shrine, the nightclub of Femi Kuti. His work has also been shown in solo and group exhibitions at museums and galleries across the world, including Tyburn Gallery (London), Rele Gallery (Lagos, Nigeria), Jennings Gallery (Washington, DC), the 5th Meditationa Biennale (Poznan, Poland), the 12th Dak'art Biennale (Dakar, Senegal), Biennale Jogja XIII (Yogyakarta, Indonesia).

Ehikhamenor's art and photographs have been used for editorials as well as cover art on books by authors such as Chimamanda Adichie, Helon Habila, Toni Kan, Chude Jideonwo, and Chika Unigwe. They have also been illustrated on fabric and exhibited at international fashion parades.

His debut poetry collection, Sordid Rituals, was published in 2002. His second book, Excuse Me! (2012), a satirical creative non-fiction view of life as an African both at home and abroad, is a recommended text in two Nigerian universities.

He has published numerous fiction and critical essays with academic journals, mainstream magazines and newspapers from around the world including The New York Times, CNN Online, Washington Post, Farafina, AGNI Magazine and Wasafiri. His short story "The Supreme Command" won the Association of Commonwealth Broadcasters Award in 2003.

He was once described as "undeniably one of Africa's most innovative contemporary artists" and one of "42 African Innovators to Watch".

== Comments on Damien Hirst piece ==
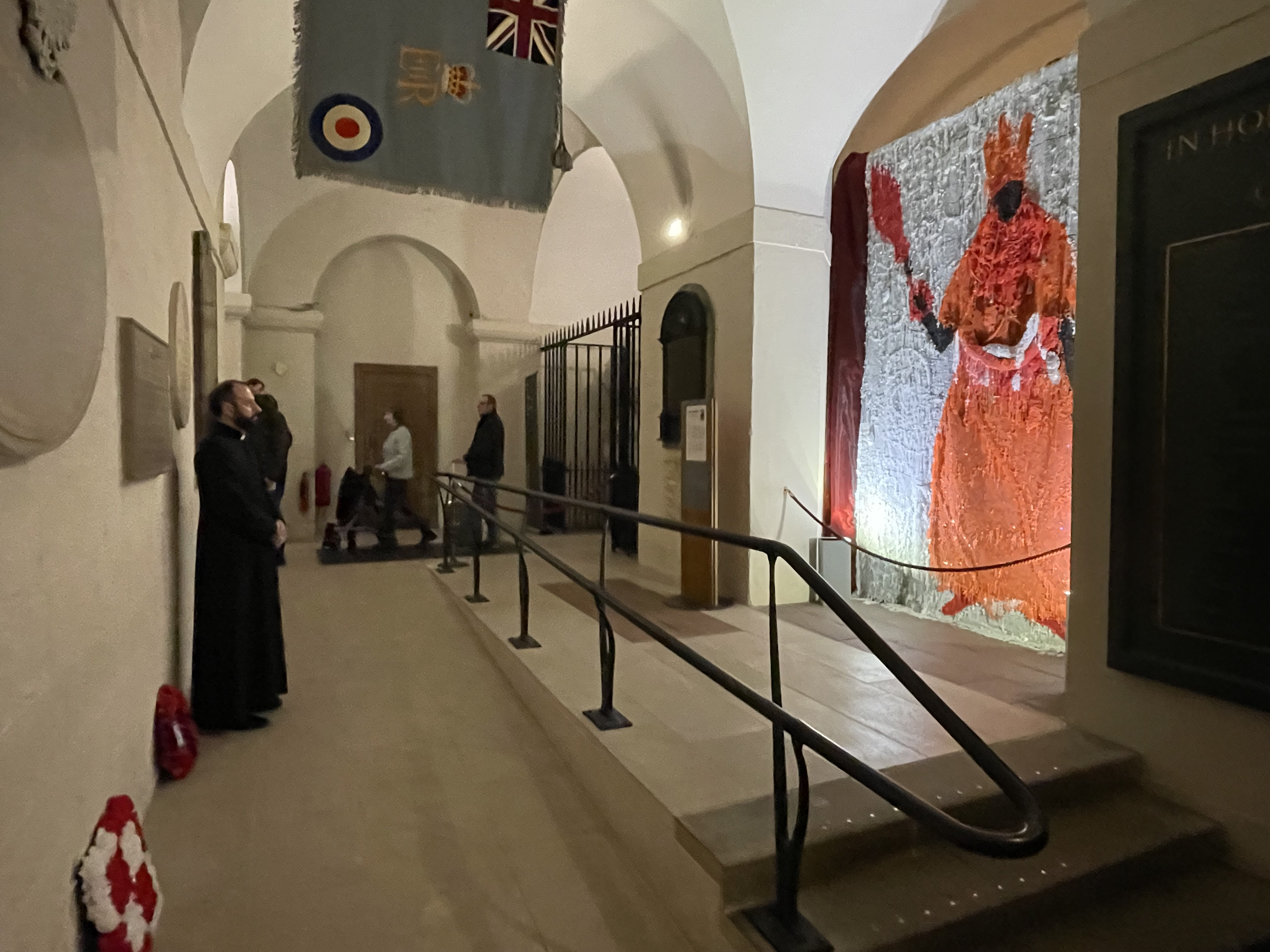
"Still Standing", a monument by Ehikhamenor, displayed at St. Paul's Cathedral in February 2022. It depicts the Oba of Benin standing beside a monument to Admiral Rawson, who led the Punitive Expedition to the Kingdom of Benin in 1897.

On 8 May 2017, while participating in the Venice Biennale, Ehikhamenor first called attention to what he describes as Damien Hirst's cultural appropriation of Nigerian Yoruba art. The exhibition of the British artist, titled Treasures From the Wreck of the Unbelievable, featured a variety of sculptures meant to be viewed as debris rescued from a shipwreck. However, one of the displayed artefacts was a copy of "Ori Olokun", a famous Ife bronze art from the 14th century now described as "Golden heads".

Of the appropriation, Ehikhamenor had posted on Instagram: "For the thousands of viewers seeing this for the first time, they won't think Ife, they won't think Nigeria. Their young ones will grow up to know this work as Damien Hirst's. As time passes it will pass for a Damien Hirst regardless of his small print caption. The narrative will shift and the young Ife or Nigerian contemporary artist will someday be told by a long nose critic 'Your work reminds me of Damien Hirst's Golden Head'. We need more biographers for our forgotten."

His words brought the issue to the forefront on local and international media.

== Angels and Muse ==
In February 2018, Ehikhamenor opened Angels and Muse, described as "a multi-modal co-working space in Lagos draped with wall murals, stained glasses, and beautiful lighting, making for a stunning visual and immersive experience." The space, also used for artist residencies, is located in the Ikoyi area of Lagos state and contains a ‘multidisciplinary room,' used for "workshop, training, book reading, experimental or conceptual art exhibitions, among other usages." The project was featured on the 10th episode of the Netflix series Amazing Interiors in July 2018.

== Book cover designs ==
- 2003: Feeding Frenzy by Jonathan Luckett
- 2004: Purple Hibiscus by Chimamanda Ngozi Adichie
- 2005: Sky High Flame by Unoma Azuah
- 2005: English in Africa, Journal of the English Department, Rhodes University, South Africa
- 2007: Measuring Times by Helon Habila
- 2008: Jambula Tree and Other Stories, Anthology of Caine Prize winners and shortlisted writers, published by Cassava Republic Press, Abuja, Nigeria
- 2008: Dreams, Miracles and Jazz by Helon Habila and Kadija Sesay
- 2008: One World, Anthology of short stories published by New Internationalist Publishers, UK
- 2008: Of Friends, Money and Greed, Anthology of three stories and a play by Hodders Publishers, UK
- 2009: Songs of Absence and Despair, collection of poems by Toni Kan
- 2009: Salutes without Guns, collection of poems by Ikeogu Oke
- 2010: Christopher Okigbo: Thirsting for Sunlight, by Obi Nwakanma
- 2010: Shahid Reads His Own Palm Poems by Reginald Dwayne Betts
- 2011: Markets of Memories; Between the Postcolonial and the Transnational, by Malik Nwosu
- 2012: A Splash of Glory by Angela Nwosu
- 2013: Oil on Water by Helon Habila
- 2014: Africa in Fragments: Essays on Nigeria, Africa and Africanity by Moses Ochonu
- 2014: Half of a Yellow Sun – (Movie Edition) by Chimamanda Ngozi Adichie
- 2014: Americanah by Chimamanda Ngozi Adichie
- 2015: Literature and Arts in the African Dispora
- 2015: Story Collection for Caine Prize for African Writing 2015
- 2016: New Generation African Poets: A chapbook box set (TATU); edited by Kwame Dawes and Chris Abani
- 2016: The Sound of Things to Come by Emmanuel Iduma
- 2017: Under the Udala Trees by Chinelo Okparanta (English and French Version)
- 2018: Reshaping Cultural Policies: Advancing Creativity for Development 2018 UNESCO
- 2018: The Rape of Shavi by Buchi Emecheta
- 2018: The Bride Price by Buchi Emecheta
- 2018: Double Yoke by Buchi Emecheta
- 2018: In the Ditch by Buchi Emecheta
- 2018: Head above Water by Buchi Emecheta
- 2018: The Slave Girl by Buchi Emecheta

== Awards and residencies ==
- 2015: Casa Zia Lina, Elba Italy
- 2016: Nirox Foundation Residency, Johannesburg, South Africa
- 2016: Greatmore Residency, Cape Town, South Africa
- 2016: Rockefeller Foundation Bellagio Fellow, Italy
- 2018: Civitella Ranieri Fellow, Italy
- 2018: Art Dubai Residency
- 2020: National Artist in Residence, Neon Museum, Las Vegas

== Exhibitions ==
=== Solo exhibitions ===
- 2000: Spirits in Dialogue, The Brazilian-American Cultural Institute Gallery, Washington, D.C.
- 2000: Beyond The Surface, Utopia Art/Grill, Washington, D.C.
- 2001: Discovering the gods, Monroe Gallery, Arts Club of Washington, Washington, D.C.
- 2004: Songs and Stories: Moonlight Delight, Utopia Gallery, Washington, D.C.
- 2005: Talking Walls, BB&T Bank, NW Washington, D.C.
- 2005: Divine Intervention, Howard University A J Blackburn Center Gallery, Washington, D.C.
- 2005: Body Language, Utopia Art/Grill, Washington, D.C.
- 2006: Beyond The River, Grenada Embassy, Washington, D.C.
- 2007: Labyrinth of Memories, Didi Museum, Lagos, Nigeria.
- 2007: Rocks & Roses, Victoria Crown Plaza, Lagos, Nigeria.
- 2008: Invasion of Privacy, Jennings Gallery, Washington, D.C
- 2009: Mirrors and Mirages, Terra Kulture Gallery, Lagos, Nigeria
- 2010: Roforofo Fight: Painting to Fela's Music, Bloom Gallery, Lagos, Nigeria
- 2011: Artist Experience, Whitespace, Ikoyi, Lagos
- 2011: Entrances & Exits: In search of not forgetting, CCA, Lagos, Nigeria
- 2012: Crossing the Line, Bloom Gallery, Lagos
- 2013: Amusing The Muse, Temple Muse, Lagos
- 2014: In The Lion's Lair: Photographing Wole Soyinka, Ake Arts and Books Festival, Abeokuta, Nigeria.
- 2014: Chronicles of the Enchanted World, Gallery of African Art, London
- 2015: Paperwork: Works on paper, Constant Capital Gallery, Lagos
- 2016: 1:54 Contemporary African Art Fair
- 2017: In the Kingdom of this World, Tyburn Gallery, London
- 2019: Daydream Esoterica, Rele Gallery, Lagos
- 2021: "Facebook HQ Open Art", in Dubai, UAE
- 2021: Do This in Memory of Us, Lehman Maupin Gallery, New York
- 2021: The Royal Academy Summer Show curated by Yinka Shonibare
- 2022: Still Standing, at St. Paul's Cathedral, London, England

=== Group exhibitions ===
- 2008: Black Creativity, Museum of Science and Industry, Chicago, IL, USA
- 2014: ARENA, Center of Contemporary Art, Torun, Poland
- 2015: Displacement, Fiction and drawings in collaboration with Toby Zielony for German Pavilion, 56th Venice Biennale, Italy
- 2015: Biennale Jogja XIII, Equator No. 3 2015, Indonesia
- 2016: A Place in Time, Nirox Foundation Sculpture Park in collaboration with Yorkshire Sculpture Park, Johannesburg, South Africa
- 2016: Dakart Biennale, curated by Simon Njami
- 2017: A Biography of the Forgotten, Nigerian Pavilion, 57th Venice Biennale, Venice, Italy with Peju Alatise and Qudus Onikeku
- 2018: ReSignifications: The Black Mediterranean
- 2018: International Contemporary Art Exhibition; Armenia
- 2020: Tomorrow there will be more of us, Stellenbosch Triennale, Stellenbosch, South Africa
- 2021: Looted History, Museum Am Rothenbaum, Hamburg, Germany.
