= Ovbiagele =

Ovbiagele is a surname. Notable people with the name include:

- Bruce Ovbiagele (fl. 2021), Nigerian-American vascular neurologist, and academic
- Desmond Ovbiagele (fl. 2014), Nigerian film director, screenwriter, and producer
- Helen Ovbiagele (born 1944), Nigerian novelist
