= Umelo =

- Gender: Female
- Language: Igbo

Origin
- Origin: Nigeria
- Region of origin: Southeast region

Umelo is a surname. Notable people with the surname include:

- Grace Umelo (born 1978), Nigerian athlete
- Rosina Umelo (born 1930), Nigerian writer
