= Adenrele Sonariwo =

African Entrepreneur and art curator

- Born: Washington DC
- Education: Howard University, Academy of Art University, University of the Arts London
- Occupations: Curator, Entrepreneur
- Father: Oba Michael Sonariwo

Adenrele Sonariwo is an African entrepreneur and art curator. She is the founder of the Rele Gallery on 32 Thompson Street, Ikoyi, Lagos, Nigeria as well as the Rele Gallery on Western Avenue in Los Angeles, California. Rele Gallery is the first African contemporary art gallery to establish an outpost in Los Angeles. Sonariwo was the lead curator of the first Nigerian pavilion at the 57th Venice Biennale in 2017. Alongside the Rele Gallery, Sonariwo is also the founding director of the Rele Arts Foundation. The foundation's projects include the annual young Contemporaries programme, which offers grants, mentorship, residences and training to a small group of emerging artists, an opportunity that results in an exhibition hosted at the gallery.

== Education ==
Sonariwo got her first degree in accounting at Howard University in 2007, then went on to work at PricewaterhouseCoopers as an accountant for four years. She has an MA Multimedia Communications from the Academy of Art University and a certificate in Curating Contemporary Art Exhibitions from the University of the Arts London.

== Rele Gallery ==
On return to Nigeria, she founded Rele Art Gallery in 2010, though it didn't kick off as a physical space until February, 2015. In 2011, while the idea of the gallery had started taking root, she attempted to start an arts university in Nigeria which she called The Modern Day School of the Arts. It was "a pop up art school for art lovers who may be stuck in a different career."

== 57th Venice Biennale ==
In 2017, Sonariwo became the lead curator of the first Nigerian pavilion at the 57th Venice Biennale. She was joined by writer and art critic Emmanuel Iduma as associate curator. The edition was themed Viva Arte Viva and the Nigerian pavilion featured the work of Victor Ehikhamenor, Peju Alatise, and Qudus Onikeku.

== Awards and other Honours ==
Sonariwo won The Future Awards for Arts and Culture in 2016. She has also been on the Power List of influencers in culture in 2016 and 2017. In March 2017, she was listed as one of the 100 Most Inspiring Women in Nigeria. She has spoken at TEDx events, and been a member of the jury at Dak'art Biennale which took place in 2018. She has also graced the cover of Guardian Life magazine in Nigeria.

In 2018, Vogue listed her as one of the "Five Coolest Women in Lagos". Since 2019, Sonariwo has been a consultant on culture ad tourism to the Governor of Ogun State.

== Personal life ==
Sonariwo is the daughter of the 18th Akarigbo of Remo, Oba Michael Sonariwo, who died in 2016 at 80 years.

== Notable interviews ==
- An Interview With Adenrele Sonariwo at The Spark (March 2018)
- Adenrele Sonariwo: Giving The Arts A Voice at The Guardian (January, 2018)
- The Venice Questionnaire
