= Adenrele =

Adenrele is a name. Notable people with the name include:

- Adenrele Sonariwo, Nigerian entrepreneur
- Omo-Oba Adenrele Ademola (born 1916), Nigerian princess and nurse
