= Bruce Ovbiagele =

American neurologist and researcher

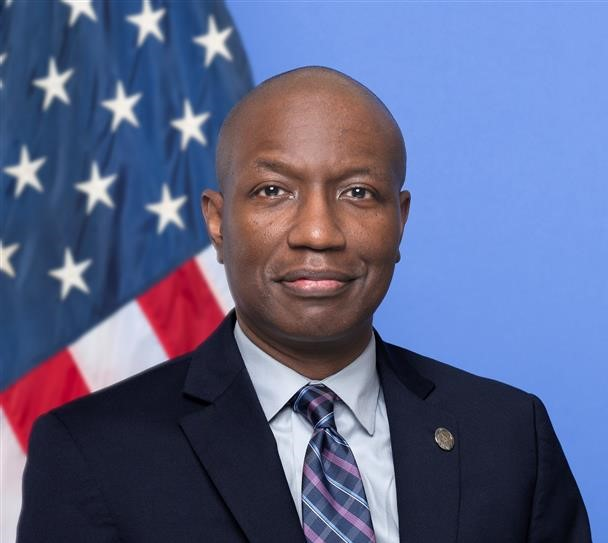
- Ovbiagele in 2024
- Born: Lagos, Nigeria
- Education: University of Lagos (MD); University of California, Los Angeles (MSc); University of California, San Diego (MAS); University of Massachusetts, Amherst (MBA); Washington University in St. Louis (MLS)
- Occupations: Physician, Academician, Editor, Leader, Founder
- Known for: Global and local vascular brain health equity research; Founder of SEQUINS, PROTECT, TRANSCENDS, TALENTS, HEADS-UP, and ASOC
- Relatives: Helen Ovbiagele (mother); Desmond Ovbiagele (brother)
- Awards: William Feinberg Award; Robert Wartenberg Award; Meritorious Achievement Award; Distinguished Scientist Award; Scientific Breakthrough Award
- Scientific career
- Fields: Neuroscience
- Workplaces: University of California, Los Angeles; University of California, San Diego; Medical University of South Carolina; University of California, San Francisco

Bruce Ovbiagele is a Nigerian-American vascular neurologist, biomedical researcher, health systems executive, academic leader, organization founder, and scientific journal editor. He serves as Professor of Neurology and Associate Dean at the University of California, San Francisco, Chief of Staff at the San Francisco VA Medical Center, Editor-in-Chief of the Journal of the American Heart Association, Vice President of the American Neurological Association, and Founding President of the Society for Equity Neuroscience. He is a member of the Board of Directors of the World Stroke Organization, and Northern California Institute of Research and Education.

== Early life and education ==
Ovbiagele was born in Lagos, Nigeria. His elementary education was at Corona School, Ikoyi. He attended Igbobi College, Federal Government College, Ijanikin and King's College, Lagos for middle and high school education. Ovbiagele received a medical degree from the University of Lagos; Master of Science in Clinical Research from the University of California, Los Angeles; Master of Advanced Studies in Leadership of Healthcare Organizations from the University of California, San Diego; Master of Business Administration from the University of Massachusetts Amherst; Master of Legal Studies from Washington University in St. Louis; Executive Certificate in Public Leadership from the Harvard Kennedy School; and Global Executive Certificate in Leadership from the Yale School of Management. Ovbiagele completed a general neurology residency at the University of California, Irvine, and a fellowship in vascular neurology at the University of California, Los Angeles.

== Academic career ==
Ovbiagele served as professor and chairman of the Neurology Department at the Medical University of South Carolina (MUSC) from 2012 to 2018. There, he held the Pihl Professorship in neuroscience and led the Department of Neurology. He was the 2021 C. Miller Fisher Visiting Professor of Neurology at Massachusetts General Hospital. Prior to MUSC, he served in various professorial roles within the University of California system. He is an adjunct professor at Favaloro University, Kwame Nkrumah University of Science and Technology, and University of Ibadan. He served as a member of the Board of Directors of the American Academy of Neurology,

Ovbiagele was appointed Associate Dean at the University of California, San Francisco (UCSF) School of Medicine in 2018.

== Research work ==
Ovbiagele's work focuses on improving stroke outcomes for disparate populations around the world through epidemiological surveillance, pharmaceutical clinical trials, genomics, and implementation science. He has led several National Institutes of Health (NIH)-funded programs that address critical aspects of stroke management for vulnerable and underserved populations, locally, nationally, and globally. Ovbiagele led the Stroke PROTECT program, which served as a basis for the Get with the Guidelines – Stroke, a national and international in-hospital initiative for improving stroke care by promoting adherence to evidence-based guidelines. Ovbiagele led the national policy writing group that projected that annual costs of stroke in the United States would rise substantially in the future requiring a greater emphasis on implementing effective preventive, acute care, and rehabilitative services.

Ovbiagele has an h-index of 100+, published over 700 peer-reviewed articles with 40+ as sole author and 400+ as lead or senior author. He is a highly ranked scholar in the field of stroke and has edited six textbooks.

== Capacity-building work ==
Ovbiagele's scientific mentoring emphasizes the research training of individuals globally underrepresented in medicine and science. He has spearheaded neuroscience workforce development initiatives, including the Training in Research for Academic Neurologists to Sustain Careers and Enhance the Numbers of Diverse Scholars (TRANSCENDS), Training Africans to Lead and Execute Neurological Trials and Studies (TALENTS), ENgaging Leaders In Global and local HealTh Equity in Neurology (ENLIGHTEN), and Editors-in-Training programs.

Ovbiagele founded the Health Equity and Actionable Disparities in Stroke: Understanding and Problem-solving (HEADS-UP) Symposium, African Stroke Organization Conference (ASOC), and World Federation of Neurology (WFN) open access journal. He established three annual awards in honor of pioneering neurologists of African ancestry to publicly recognize individuals of any background who have shown excellence in neurological disparities research and mentoring; the Edgar J. Kenton Award (in 2020) for the American Heart Association Health Equity and Actionable Disparities in Stroke: Understanding and Problem-solving (HEADS-UP) Symposium, Benjamin Oluwakayode Osuntokun Award (in 2021) for the African Stroke Organization Conference, and Patrick A. Griffith Award (in 2025) for the Society for Equity Neuroscience Meeting.

== Education work ==
Ovbiagele chaired the International Stroke Conference from 2016 to 2018 during which he created several new initiatives including the Game of Strokes Session, Crossfire Debates Session, and Outstanding Stroke Research Mentor Award.

Ovbiagele developed and directed several educational courses for the American Academy of Neurology including the "Health Equity for Neurologists", "Stroke Update", "Secondary Stroke Prevention", and "Therapy Program: Stroke".

Ovbiagele served as the inaugural national medical spokesperson for the American Heart Association "Power-to-End-Stroke" campaign, which focused on raising awareness about the disproportionate burden of stroke experienced by African Americans, and national spokesperson for the National Stroke Association "Steps Against Recurrent Stroke" Campaign.

Ovbiagele has given 300+ invited academic lectures and 30+ invited community outreach presentations around the world.

== Honors ==
- Member, National Academy of Medicine
- Member, Association of American Physicians
- Member, American Clinical and Climatological Association
- Member, World Association of Medical Editors
- Member, Aspen Global Leadership Network
- Master, American College of Physicians
- Fellow, International Science Council
- Fellow, The World Academy of Sciences
- Fellow, World Stroke Organization
- Fellow, American Association for the Advancement of Science
- Fellow, Royal College of Physicians
- Fellow, Royal Society for Public Health
- Fellow, European Stroke Organization
- Fellow, African Academy of Sciences
- Fellow, African Scientific Institute
- Fellow, Nigerian Academy of Science
- Fellow, Academy of Medicine Specialties of Nigeria
- Fellow, American Academy of Neurology
- Fellow, American Neurological Association
- Fellow, American Heart Association
- Fellow, American Association for Physician Leadership
- Fellow, AAMC
- Fellow, Liberty Fellowship

Ovbiagele served as a member of the National Institute of Neurological Disorders and Stroke (NINDS) Advisory Council, National Institutes of Health Council of Councils, and Food and Drug Administration (FDA) Peripheral and Central Nervous System Drugs Advisory Committee. He is an honorary life member of the Stroke Society of Australasia and Korean Stroke Society.

== Awards ==
- American Academy of Neurology Michael Pessin Stroke Leadership Prize (2008)
- American Stroke Association William Feinberg Award (2021)
- American Heart Association Ron Haddock International Impact Award (2021)
- American Heart Association Stroke Council Award (2021)
- American Brain Foundation Mridha Humanitarian Award (2022)
- American Academy of Neurology Robert Wartenberg Award (2022)
- American Neurological Association Audrey Penn Award (2022)
- National Medical Association Meritorious Achievement Award (2022)
- American Heart Association Distinguished Scientist Award (2022)
- American Academy of Neurology Health Equity Research Award (2023)
- World Stroke Organization Award for Services to Stroke (2023)
- American College of Physicians W. Lester Henry Award (2024)
- American Brain Foundation Scientific Breakthrough Award (2024)
- American Stroke Association Edgar J. Kenton III Award (2026)
- World Hypertension League Detlev Ganten Excellence Award (2026)
- American Heart Association Eugene Braunwald Academic Mentorship Award (2026)

== Recognitions ==
- American Heart Association Service Award for the Power to End Stroke Campaign (2006)
- American Heart Association Service Award for conducting Los Angeles Unified School District high school student hypertension Study (2008)
- Roxana Todd Hodges Stroke Prevention Visiting Professorship at University of Southern California (2011)
- American Academy of Neurology Visiting Professorship at Morehouse School of Medicine (2011)
- 100 Nigerians Leading Transformational Change. Changemakers: Profiles and Biographies (2022)
- Annual Neurology Diversity, Equity and Inclusion Visiting Professorship at the University of Maryland
- Most Outstanding Nigerians in the Diaspora. Exemplars 100: Profiles and Biographies (2023)
- Kaplan Stroke Visiting Professorship, New York University (2023)
- Dean's Distinguished Visiting Professorship at the University of Colorado (2023)
- Annual Visiting Stroke Professorship at Duke University (2024)
- National Science Foundation Presidential Award for Excellence in Science, Math, and Engineering Mentoring Finalist (2024)
- Congressional Record Mention for Award-Winning Work in Health Equity Research (2024)

== Articles ==
- Research publications in PubMed Central

== Books ==
- Stroke Management and Recovery (2013). Future Medicine. London, England.
- Best Practices in Neurological Care (2014). Future Medicine. London, England.
- Ischemic Stroke Therapeutics: A Comprehensive Guide (2016). 1st Edition. Springer Publishing. New York City, New York.
- Intracerebral Hemorrhage Therapeutics: Concepts and Customs (2018). Springer Publishing. New York City, New York.
- Ischemic Stroke Therapeutics: A Comprehensive Guide. 2nd Edition (2024). Springer Publishing. New York City, New York.
- Achieving Equity in Neurological Practice: Principles and Pathways (2024). Springer Publishing. New York City, New York.

== Personal life ==
Ovbiagele is the son of Bruce Ovbiagele Snr, a media broadcaster, and Helen Ovbiagele a novelist and journalist.
