= In the Ditch =

In the Ditch may refer to:

- In the Ditch (novel), 1972 novel by Buchi Emecheta
- "In the Ditch", song by Gang of Four from the album Solid Gold
