= Pacesetter Novels =

Series by African writers started in 1977

Pace setter
- Publisher: MacMillan
- Publication date: 1977

Pacesetter Novels are a collection of 130 works of popular fiction written by notable African authors, published by Macmillan. The series was started in 1977, with the first book being Director! by Agbo Areo.

== Writing style ==
The Pacesetters series was characterised by adventures of falling in love, ethno-religious conflicts, tragic tales of woe, cautionary tales, and "rags to riches" (and sometimes back to rags!) tales.

== Book cover artwork ==
The book covers usually featured very garish pictures that served to illustrate the main theme of that particular novel.

== Authors ==
The authors of the books are noted African novelists and writers. Some of the more celebrated of these are Buchi Emecheta, Barbara Kimenye and Helen Ovbiagele.

== Titles ==
- 1. A Picture Of Innocence – A. Mhlope
- 2. Agony In Her Voice – Peter Katuliiba
- 3. Angel Of Death – Nandi Dlovu
- 4. Anything For Money – Akinbolu Babarinsa
- 5. The Betrayer – Sam A. Adewoye
- 6. Bitter Consequences – Osman Conteh
- 7. Bittersweet – Yéma L. Hunter
- 8. The Black Temple – Mohmed T. Garba
- 9. Blackmailers – Joseph Mangut
- 10. Bloodbath At Lobster Close† – D. Ighavini
- 11. Bonds Of Love – Hope Dube
- 12. The Border Runners – James Irungu & James Shimanyula
- 13. Camera Never Lies – A. Mhlope
- 14. Cherished Dreams – Mugarra Adyeeri
- 15. Child Of The Rainbow – Anthony Kwamlah Johnson
- 16. Child Of War – Ben Chirasha
- 17. Christmas In The City – Afari Assan
- 18. Circle Of Betrayal – James Irungu
- 19. Coup! – Kalu Okpi
- 20. Cross-Fire – Kalu Okpi
- 21. The Cyclist* – Philip Phil-Ebosie
- 22. Danger Express – D. Msere
- 23. Dangerous Inheritance – Chuma Nwokolo
- 24. Dangerous Waters – Maurice Sotabinda
- 25. Dead Of Night – Philip Phil-Ebosie
- 26. Deadly News – Prim Nga'ab
- 27. Dealers In Death – Victor Thorpe
- 28. Death Is Woman – Dickson Ighavini
- 29. Dela Boya-African Detective – Kojo Akwa
- 30. The Delinquent – Mohammed Sule
- 31. Desert Storm – Hope Dube
- 32. Director! – Agbo Areo
- 33. Double Dating – Walije Gondwe
- 34. Double Trouble – Osman Conteh
- 35. A Dream Called September – Christine Botchway
- 36. The Equatorial Assignment – David G. Maillu
- 37. Europeans Only? – George Mason
- 38. Evbu My Love – Helen Ovbiagele
- 39. The Extortionist – Chuma Nwokolo
- 40. Felicia – Rosina Umelo
- 41. Finding Francis – Damian Asabuhi
- 42. Finger Of Suspicion – Rosina Umelo
- 43. For Better For Worse – Osman P. Conteh
- 44. For Mbatha And Rabeka – David G. Maillu
- 45. Forever Yours – Helen Ovbiagele
- 46. Forgive Me Maryam – Mohmed T. Garba
- 47. Francie Molala and the Mercedes Affair – D. Fitzgibbons
- 48. A Fresh Start – Helen Ovbiagele
- 49. Frozen Fire* – Victor Thorpe
- 50. Give Me Money – B. Mtobwa
- 51. Gun Merchant – Kwasi Koranteng
- 52. Harvest Of Love – Sam Aryeetey
- 53. Have Mercy – Joseph Mangut
- 54. The Hopeful Lovers* – Agbo Areo
- 55. The Hornet's Nest – Jill Inyundo
- 56. The Infamous Act – Mohammed Sule
- 57. The Instrument – Victor Thorpe
- 58. A Kind Of Marriage – Buchi Emecheta
- 59. The Last Aloe – R. Wooding
- 60. Life Is A Lottery — Sotabinda
- 61. The Lost Generation – J. Irungu
- 62. Love – Kalu Okpi
- 63. Love Letters – Rosina Umelo
- 64. Love Match: Imperfect Partners – Walije Gondwe
- 65. Love On The Rocks – Andrew Sesinyi
- 66. Love's Dilemma – Walije Gondwe
- 67. Mark Of The Cobra – Valentine Alily
- 68. The Mating Game – Barbara Kimenye
- 69. Meet Me In Conakry – Sheriff Sarr
- 70. The Money Doublers – Maurice Sotabinda
- 71. The Money Road – Miriam Nkhana
- 72. Moses and the Gunman – B. Kimenye
- 73. Naira Power – Buchi Emecheta
- 74. Nanasi Girl – Damian Asabuhi
- 75. The Night Of the Full Moon – Muheki-Rushedgé
- 76. On The Road – Kalu Okpi
- 77. Operation Rhino – James Irungu & James Shimanyula
- 78. The Other Side Of Town – Sam Aryeetey
- 79. Pains Of A Maid – Sarah Mkhonza
- 80. Poisoned Bait – James Ngumy
- 81. The Politician* – Kalu Okpi
- 82. Possessed! – Atu Yalley
- 83. The President’s Son – Kwasi Koranteng
- 84. Race Against Rats – Nandi Dlovu
- 85. Rassie – Andrew Sesinyi
- 86. Remember Death – Gladstone Meena
- 87. Rich Girl, Poor Boy – Bode Osanyin
- 88. The Runaway Bride – Barbara Kimenye
- 89. The Schemers – Helen Ovbiagele
- 90. Sea Running – Tish Farrell
- 91. Second-Hand Love – Walije Gondwe
- 92. Secret Blood – John Chitambo
- 93. Shadow Of A Dream – Hope Dube
- 94. Shadow Of Death – Jackson Katondwaci
- 95. Shameful Sacrifice – Richard Anieke
- 96. Sisi – Yemi Sikuade
- 97. Small Affairs – Kenneth Rowley
- 98. The Smugglers* – Kalu Okpi
- 99. Something To Hide – Rosina Umelo
- 100. South African Affair* – Kalu Okpi
- 101. Spears Down – Christine Botchway
- 102. State Secret – Hope Dube
- 103. Stone of Vengeance – Victor Thorpe
- 104. Stop Press: Murder! – Mohmed T. Garba
- 105. The Stranger Son – Ruth Reeves
- 106. Sunset At Noon – A. Johnson
- 107. Sweet Revenge – Victor A. Ulojiofor
- 108. Symphony of Destruction – Sunday D. Adebomi
- 109. Teardrops At Sunset – Richard Akoji
- 110. Tell Me No More – Sensenjani Lukhele
- 111. The Legacy – Kwasi Koranteng
- 112. Thorns Of Life – David G. Maillu
- 113. To Have & To Hold – Shelley Davidow
- 114. Tobacco Smoke – Kwasi Koranteng
- 115. Too Cold For Comfort – Jide Oguntoye
- 116. Too Young To Die* – Omondi Mak'Oloo
- 117. The Treasure – Peter Katuliiba
- 118. Truth Will Out – Dede Kamkondo
- 119. The Undesirable Element – Mohammed Sule
- 120. Vicious Circle – Alexander Kanengoni
- 121. Wages Of Sin – Ibe Oparandu
- 122. What The Future Holds – Sarah Mkhonza
- 123. When Love Dies* – Gladstone Meena
- 124. Where Children Play – Christine Botchway
- 125. Who Killed Mohtta? – Edison N. Yongai
- 126. Who Really Cares – Helen Ovbiagele
- 127. Women For Sale – Joseph Mangut
- 128. The Worshippers – Victor Thorpe
- 129. You Never Know – Helen Ovbiagele
- 130. Zero Hour – Ben Mtobwa

NB. † No longer exists * Out of print
