= Second Class Citizen (novel) =

1974 novel by Buchi Emecheta

- First edition cover
- Author: Buchi Emecheta
- Language: English
- Genre: Literary fiction
- Publisher: Allison & Busby
- Publication date: 1974; 52 years ago
- Publication place: London, England
- Media type: Print
- Pages: 174
- ISBN: 978-0-8076-1128-9
- Preceded by: In the Ditch
- Followed by: The Bride Price

Second Class Citizen is a 1974 novel by Nigerian writer Buchi Emecheta. It was first published in London, England, by Allison and Busby, where Emecheta's editor was Margaret Busby, and was subsequently published in the United States in 1975 by George Braziller. Often described as semi-autobiographical, the novel entails the story of Adah, the major book character, Nigerian woman who overcomes strict tribal domination of women and countless setbacks to achieve an independent life for herself and her children. She moved from Nigeria to London, where she faced hard living conditions and a violent marriage to Francis. The novel explores the themes of gender and marriage, religion and immigration.

== Plot ==
Adah is a black Nigerian girl from the Igbo part of that country. She is from Ibuza and lives in Lagos. She dreams of moving to the United Kingdom. After her father dies, Adah is sent to live with her uncle's family. She goes to school in Nigeria and is employed working for the American consulate as a library clerk. The compensation from the job is enough to make her a desirable bride for Francis.

Francis travels to the United Kingdom with the help of Adah to study accountancy. She is the breadwinner of her family and her husband's family. Adah convinces her husband's family that she and the children also belong in the UK. Francis believes they are second-class residents in the United Kingdom as they are not citizens of the country. Adah finds employment working for another library and pays for their expenses, while also providing primary care for their children.

Shortly after the birth of her fourth child, Adah writes a book based on her life. She shows it to some of her friends at the library, who encourage her and advise her to show it to a publisher. But when she also shows the manuscript to Francis, he throws the book into a fire. This enrages Adah, who fights back by leaving him and taking the children with her.

However, Francis seeks them out at their new place and beats Adah mercilessly in an attempt to bring her back home, despite her being heavily pregnant with their fifth child. Adah responds by seeking legal intervention. Francis is instructed by the court to stay away from them and is ordered to pay child support, to which he responds that he does not care if the children were put up for adoption. This further infuriates Adah, who declares to the court that the children are hers and she would never let them down as long as she lives.

The book ends with Adah and her children leaving the court victorious. On their way out, Adah runs into an old friend of hers from Nigeria, who pays for her taxi cab back home.

== Background ==
This sequel to Emecheta's 1972 novel In the Ditch was written after Emecheta had left her unhappy marriage and was raising her five children as a single mother. On the dedication page to Second Class Citizen, the author references "my dear children, Florence, Sylvester, Jake, Christy and Alice, without whose sweet background noises this book would not have been written".

== Critical reception ==
Hermione Harris wrote in Race & Class: "Of the scores of books about race and black communities in Britain that had appeared during the 1960s and early 1970s, the great majority are written by white academic ultimately concerned with the relationship between white society and black 'immigrants'. Few accounts have emerged from those on the receiving end of British racism or liberalism of their own black experience. On the specific situation of black women there is almost nothing. Second Class Citizen is therefore something of a revelation."

A new edition of the book was published for the Penguin Modern Classics series in October 2020, after many years of being out of print. John Self in The Guardian wrote that, despite being on Granta magazine's Best of Young British Novelists list in 1983, in subsequent years Emecheta "...didn't get the column inches. So it's a late justice that she is one of the few Granta alumni, alongside Martin Amis and Shiva Naipaul, to be promoted to the Penguin Modern Classics list." Ainehi Edoro, writing in the Times Literary Supplement, observed that Second Class Citizen "is a book about dreams, a fact often forgotten in the hurry to present it as a primer on race and gender politics", noting that while the novel explores these issues, "it also tells a story of utopian awakening: of how Adah, a girl fated by patriarchy to be silent and insignificant, finds the voice to tell the world that she matters."
