= The Rape of Shavi =

1983 novel by Buchi Emecheta

- Author: Buchi Emecheta
- Language: English
- Genre: fiction
- Set in: Shavi, Africa
- Publisher: George Braziller
- Publication date: 1983
- Publication place: Nigeria
- Media type: Print (hardcover)
- Pages: 229 pp (first edition)
- ISBN: 0807611182 (first edition)
- OCLC: 11519833
- Preceded by: Adah's Story
- Followed by: Double Yoke

The Rape of Shavi is a 1983 fiction novel written by Nigerian novelist Buchi Emecheta. It was first published in 1983 by George Braziller.

== Plot summary ==
The novel centers on the Shavians; a fictional community in the Sahara desert where everyone is no greater than the other. Then the Westerners arrive: Andria, Ista, Flip, Mendoza and Ronje, who crash-land on Shavi while King Patayon the Slow is holding a conversation with his wife. The westerners, who the Shavians think to be messengers, at first blend into the culture and life of people although Ronje rapes a Shavi. The westerners join in the farming and trading of the Shavians, while they work on fueling and repairing their plane called "Newark". The Westerners finally return to England with industrial diamond and crystals and also Asogba, the son of Patayon the Slow. Mendoza who has found a new line of business sends Asogba back to Shavi with guns and jeeps. Asogba on the other hands extorts his people and neighbouring villagers, in order to send diamond and crystal to Mendoza. The crystal market crashes and Asogba is left devastated and insolvent.

== Reception ==
Richard Eder writing for Los Angeles Times called it a "lopsided fable." Michiko Kakutani while reviewing the book for The New York Times noted that "Emecheta's interpretation, in contrast, is so pat, so superficial, that the reader is barely moved to shrug." A researcher at Gale compared it to the "European conquest of Africa."
