= Journal of the American Heart Association =

- Cover of a 2021 issue of JAHA
- Discipline: Cardiology
- Language: English
- Edited by: Bruce Ovbiagele

Publication details
- History: 2012–present
- Publisher: John Wiley & Sons on behalf of the American Heart Association (United States)
- Frequency: 24/year
- Open access: Yes
- License: CC BY-NC
- Impact factor: 6.107 (2021)

Standard abbreviations
- ISO 4: J. Am. Heart Assoc.

Indexing
- CODEN: JAHABZ
- ISSN: 2047-9980

Links
- Journal homepage; Wiley site

Journal of the American Heart Association: Cardiovascular and Cerebrovascular Disease is a peer-reviewed open access scientific journal and an official journal of the American Heart Association. Since 2015, it is also published with John Wiley & Sons. It was established in 2012 and the editor-in-chief is Bruce Ovbiagele (University of California, San Francisco).

== Scope ==
The journal publishes all types of original research articles, including studies conducted with human subjects and experimental models, as well as applied clinical, epidemiological, and healthcare policy papers related to cardiovascular and cerebrovascular diseases.

== Abstracting and indexing ==
The journal is abstracted and indexed in:

- Academic Search
- EMBASE
- Index Medicus/MEDLINE/PubMed
- Science Citation Index Expanded

According to the Journal Citation Reports, the journal has a 2021 impact factor of 6.107, ranking it 42nd out of 143 journals in the category "Cardiac & Cardiovascular Systems".
