= Helen Ovbiagele =

Nigerian novelist (born 1944)

Helen Aiyeohusa Ovbiagele
- Born: Benin City
- Occupation: Nigerian Novelist
- Language: English
- Citizenship: Nigerian

Helen Aiyeohusa Ovbiagele (born 1944) is a Nigerian novelist. She was born in Benin City, and after attending C.M.S. Girls' School, Benin City, and St. Peter's College, Kaduna, she studied English and French at the University of Lagos and studied at the Institut Français du Royaume-Uni in London. Her work is associated with the romance genre, published in Macmillan's hugely popular Pacesetter Novels series, but her heroines are said to be a bit older and more independent than normal for that form. She was the Woman Editor of the Vanguard newspaper for 30 years. Ovbiagele also penned several weekly columns for the Vanguard, including the highly popular Treena Kwenta single mum series, Dear Rebecca Agony Aunt series, and an editorial column entitled Woman's Own. Ovbiagele is the mother of Bruce Ovbiagele, founder of several global neuroscience organizations and programs; and Desmond Ovbiagele, screen writer, film/documentary director, and movie producer.

== Bibliography ==
- Evbu My Love (1981)
- A Fresh Start (1982)
- You Never Know (1982)
- Forever Yours (1986)
- Who Really Cares (1986)
- The Schemers (1991)
- Echoes of Evbu My Love (2024)
