= The New Tribe =

2000 novel by Buchi Emecheta

- Author: Buchi Emecheta
- Language: English
- Series: African Writers Series
- Genre: Literary fiction
- Set in: Nigeria, London
- Publisher: Allison & Busby, Heinemann
- Publication date: 2000
- Publication place: Nigeria
- Media type: Print (paperback and hardcover)

The New Tribe is a 2000 novel written by Nigerian writer Buchi Emecheta. It was first published by Allison & Busby, and republished by Heinemann as part of the African Writers Series.

== Plot ==
The novel follows the story of Chester, a young Nigerian boy adopted into a middle-class, white family in England and grows up as the only black child in his community. He embarks on a journey of self-discovery to Nigeria in search of his roots.
