= The Joys of Motherhood =

1979 novel by Buchi Emecheta

- Book cover
- Author: Buchi Emecheta
- Language: English
- Genre: Bildungsroman
- Publisher: Allison & Busby
- Publication date: 1979
- Publication place: Nigeria
- Media type: Print
- Preceded by: The Slave Girl
- Followed by: The Moonlight Bride

The Joys of Motherhood is a novel written by Buchi Emecheta. It was first published in London, UK, by Allison & Busby in 1979 and was first published in Heinemann's African Writers Series in 1980 and reprinted in 1982, 2004, 2008. The basis of the novel is the "necessity for a woman to be fertile, and above all to give birth to sons". It tells the tragic story of Nnu-Ego, daughter of Nwokocha Agbadi and Ona, who had a bad fate with childbearing. This novel explores the life of a Nigerian woman, Nnu Ego. Nnu's life centres on her children and through them, she gains the respect of her community. Traditional tribal values and customs begin to shift with increasing colonial presence and influence, pushing Nnu Ego to challenge accepted notions of "mother", "wife", and "woman".

Through Nnu Ego's journey, Emecheta forces her readers to consider the dilemmas associated with adopting new ideas and practices against the inclination to cleave to tradition. In this novel, Emecheta reveals and celebrates the pleasures derived from fulfilling responsibilities related to family matters in child-bearing, mothering, and nurturing activities among women. However, the author additionally highlights how the "joys of motherhood" also include anxiety, obligation, and pain.

In the words of critic Marie Umeh, Emecheta "breaks the prevalent portraitures in African writing.... It must have been difficult to draw provocative images of African motherhood against the already existing literary models, especially on such a sensitive subject."

== Plot ==
Nwokocha Agbadi is a proud, handsome and wealthy local chief. Although he has many wives, he finds a woman named Ona more attractive. Ona ("priceless jewel") is the name he has given her, the daughter of a fellow chief.

When she was young, her father took her everywhere he went, saying she was his ornament, and Nwokocha Agbadi would say jokingly in response, "Why don't you wear her around your neck like an Ona?" It never occurred to him that he would be one of the men to later ask for her when she grew up.

During one rainy season Chief Agbadi and his friends go elephant hunting and having come too near the heavy creature, the chief is thrown with a mighty tusk into a nearby sugar-cane bush and is pinned to the floor. He aims his spear at the belly of the mighty animal and kills it but not until it has wounded him badly. Agbadi passes out and was thought to have died, instead, he wakes up after several days to find Ona beside him.

During his period of recovery, he sleeps with her, and shortly thereafter he finds out that his senior wife Agunwa is very ill. She later dies, and it is thought that, perhaps, she became ill as a result of seeing her husband making love to Ona on his apparent deathbed.

The funeral festivities continue through the day. When it is time to put Agunwa in her grave, everything she will need in her afterlife having been placed in her coffin, her personal slave is called. According to custom, a good slave is supposed to jump into the grave willingly to accompany her mistress but this young and beautiful slave begs for her life, much to the annoyance of the men. The hapless slave is pushed into the shallow grave but struggles out, appealing to her owner Agbadi, whose eldest son cries angrily: "So my mother does not deserve a decent burial?" So saying, he gives her a sharp blow with the head of the cutlass. Another relative gives her a final blow to the head and she falls into the grave, silenced forever. The burial is then completed.

Ona becomes pregnant from sleeping with Agbadi and delivers a baby girl named Nnu Ego ("twenty bags of cowries"). The baby is born with a mark on her head resembling that made by the cutlass used on the head of the slave woman. Later, Ona gives birth to another son, but she dies in premature labour and her son also dies a day afterwards.

Meanwhile, Nnu Ego becomes a woman but is seemingly barren. After several months with no sign of fruitfulness, she consults several herbalists and is told that the slave woman who is her Chi (or patron goddess) will not give her a child. Her husband Amatokwu takes another wife who, before long, conceives.

Nnu Ego returns to her father's house. She is married, sight unseen, to a new husband who lives in Lagos; so she journeys from her village to the city where she meets her new husband, Nnaife, whom she does not like but, otherwise, prays that, if she can conceive a child with him, she will love him. Some time afterward, she does give birth to a baby boy, whom she later finds dead.

Shocked, she is on the verge of jumping into the river when a villager draws her back and comforts her. Over the course of her life, she gives birth to nine surviving children.

At some point, Nnaife, a laundryman for a white man, is drafted into the army during wartime, but, on her own, Nnu Ego can barely manage to feed them.

Nnu Ego returns to the village, where she is feted as a great woman because with two married daughters, and two sons abroad (the second son emigrates to Canada), she is expected to be filled with the joys of motherhood.

It is suggested that her children's success should be enough for her, instead, she dies a lonely death in the village, and is regarded as a madwoman.

Only after her death do her children arrive to throw a lavish funeral for her; they spend time and money on her funeral, which they did not spend in her life.

It is noted that Nnu Ego never gives children to women who pray to her for them.

== Critical reception ==
The reviewer for West Africa magazine wrote: "Buchi Emecheta has a way of making readable and interesting ordinary events. She looks at things without flinching and without feeling the need to distort or exaggerate. It is a remarkable talent.... this is, in my opinion, the best novel Buchi Emecheta has yet written." A. N. Wilson stated in The Observer: "Buchi Emecheta has a growing reputation for her treatment of African women and their problems. This reputation will surely be enhanced by The Joys of Motherhood."
