= The Slave Girl (1977 novel) =

1977 novel by Buchi Emecheta

- Cover of the UK 1st edition
- Author: Buchi Emecheta
- Cover artist: Taiwo Jegede
- Language: English
- Genre: Historical fiction
- Published: 1977 (hardback)
- Publisher: Allison and Busby
- Publication place: United Kingdom
- Pages: 179
- Awards: Jock Campbell Award from the New Statesman
- Preceded by: The Bride Price
- Followed by: The Joys of Motherhood

The Slave Girl is a 1977 novel by Nigerian writer Buchi Emecheta that was published in the UK by Allison and Busby and in the US by George Braziller. It won the Jock Campbell Award from the New Statesman in 1978. The novel was Emecheta's fourth book; it was dedicated to her editor Margaret Busby.

The Slave Girl was reissued in 2018 by Omenala Press.

== Synopsis ==
The Slave Girl is set in colonial Nigeria, in the early 1900s, and tells the story of Ogbanje Ojebeta who, following the death of her parents, is sold into domestic slavery. "She finds solace among her fellow slaves but learns the painful lessons of what it means to be owned by another. As Ojebeta grows into a woman, she longs for freedom and for a family of her own. She realizes that she must ultimately decide her own destiny, and when the opportunity arises, makes a choice that we as modern readers might find surprising."

== Critical reception ==
Favourable reviews of the novel appeared in publications including the New Statesman – which said: "Buchi Emecheta generates a fine sympathy with human distress; this loving novel makes a telling indictment of pagan and Christian inhumanity to women" – and the Sunday Telegraph: "Ms. Emecheta once again creates an authentic character and scene and... explains the network of customs from the past which have contributed to present attitudes."

Writing in The Guardian, Carol Dix observed that the novel "pales a lot of academic feminist writing into insignificance....It makes you wish more writers came from the non-white-educated-middle-classes; which is something we should be trying to encourage." According to Juliana Ogunseiju's review for Africa Book Club: "It is one of the very best pre-colonial African books and is heartily recommended." Anita Kern in World Literature Today stated: "Ojebeta is a welcome addition to the still too small gallery of Nigerian heroines."

== Awards ==
- 1978: Jock Campbell Award from the New Statesman
