= Render to Caesar =

2014 film directed by Desmond Ovbiagele and Onyekachi Ejim

- Theatrical poster
- Directed by: Desmond Ovbiagele; Onyekachi Ejim
- Written by: Desmond Ovbiagele
- Produced by: Nnamdi Oboli; Omoni Oboli; Desmond Ovbiagele
- Starring: Wale Ojo; Gbenga Akinnagbe; Omoni Oboli; Bimbo Manuel
- Cinematography: Johnny Askwith
- Edited by: Steve Sodiya
- Music by: Michael Ogunlade
- Production company: Mighty Man Entertainment
- Release date: 28 March 2014
- Running time: 120 minutes
- Country: Nigeria
- Language: English

Render to Caesar is a 2014 Nigerian crime thriller film written and produced by Desmond Ovbiagele, directed by Desmond Ovbiagele and Onyekachi Ejim. It stars Wale Ojo, Gbenga Akinnagbe, Omoni Oboli and Bimbo Manuel with special appearances from Kehinde Bankole and Femi Jacobs. The film was initially slated to be released in the second quarter of 2013 but was pushed back due to delayed post production; it was however released on 28 March 2014. The film which was supported by Microsoft, Trace and FCMB, tells the story of two friends who return from abroad to join the Nigeria Police Force, only to be faced with an impossible mystery case involving a criminal, Caesar (Lucky Ejim) who has been terrorising the city of Lagos for quite sometime.

Although the film received mixed critical reviews, it won awards for "Best Original Screenplay" and "Best Actor in a Supporting Role" at the 2014 Nollywood Movies Awards. It also received awards for "Best Screenplay" and "Best Sound Design" at the 2014 Best of Nollywood Awards.

== Cast ==
- Wale Ojo as Pade
- Gbenga Akinnagbe as Dipo
- Omoni Oboli as Alero
- Lucy Ejim as Caesar
- Bimbo Manuel
- Femi Jacobs
- Onyekachi Ejim
- Dede Mabiaku
- Kalu Ikeagwu
- Chris Iheuwa
- Kehinde Bankole
- KC Ejelonu
- Steve Onu
- MC Abbey
- Yvonne Ekwere

== Release ==
Render to Caesar premiered at the Silverbird Galleria, Victoria Island, Lagos on 28 March 2014. In 2015, it was shortlisted for the main feature film competition at the 24th edition of FESPACO in Ouagadougou, Burkina Faso. It was also an Official Selection at the 2015 San Diego Black Film Festival, as well as the 2014 Pan African Film Festival (PAFF).

== Reception ==
=== Critical reception ===
Render to Caesar has been met with mixed reviews. Sodas & Popcorn gave it a rating of 3 out of 5 stars, it cited that the film has plot holes, says the technicalities are flawed mostly as a result of "lazy job". It concluded by stating: "For a genre which hasn’t really been explored in the Nigerian movie scene much, it tries to be unique by bringing in witty dialogues and a good degree of continuity, until pieces of the big puzzle (which are supposed to add up) fail to do so. Render to Caesar is an experiment, which even with its many flaws, in the end is a big step forward". Wilfred Okiche of YNaija says: "Render to Caesar wants to be many things at once. A crime thriller, a police procedural, a love story and a twisty film noir". He pointed out that although the film has its good moments, the moments are often ruined with bizarre turn of events, easy predictability or ridiculous plotholes. He added: "The special effects are not as spectacular as they could have been, the acting isn’t as fine as it should and the screenplay, with its twists and turns isn’t as impressive as it fancies itself". He concluded by saying the film seem more like an "experiment" than a "confident production".

Wilfred Okiche commended the film for its brilliant portrayal of the Nigerian Police force. He cited Ejim as the outstanding act in the film, but also stated that there is no chemistry between Omoni and Gbenga on screen and that their romantic scenes turn out to be one of the down sides of the screenplay.

=== Accolades ===
Render to Caesar received nine nominations and won two awards at the 2014 Nollywood Movies Awards. It also received three nominations and won two awards at the 2014 Best of Nollywood Awards.

Complete list of Awards
Award	Category	Recipients and nominees	Result
Best of Nollywood Awards (2014 Best of Nollywood Awards)	Best Screenplay	Desmond Ovbiagele	Won
Best of Nollywood Awards (2014 Best of Nollywood Awards)	Best Actor in a Leading Role	Gbenga Akinnagbe	Nominated
Best of Nollywood Awards (2014 Best of Nollywood Awards)	Best Sound Design	Michael Ogunlade	Won
Nollywood Movies Awards (2014 Nollywood Movies Awards)	Best Director	Desmond Ovbiagele	Nominated
Nollywood Movies Awards (2014 Nollywood Movies Awards)	Best Original Screenplay	Desmond Ovbiagele	Won
Nollywood Movies Awards (2014 Nollywood Movies Awards)	Best Actor in a Leading Role	Gbenga Akinnagbe	Nominated
Nollywood Movies Awards (2014 Nollywood Movies Awards)	Best Cinematography	Johnny Askwith	Nominated
Nollywood Movies Awards (2014 Nollywood Movies Awards)	Best Actor in a Supporting Role	Lucky Ejim	Won
Nollywood Movies Awards (2014 Nollywood Movies Awards)	Best Editing	Steve Sodiya	Nominated
Nollywood Movies Awards (2014 Nollywood Movies Awards)	Best Sound Design	Michael Ogunlade	Nominated
Nollywood Movies Awards (2014 Nollywood Movies Awards)	Best Music Soundtrack	Michael Ogunlade and Seun Owoaje	Nominated
Nollywood Movies Awards (2014 Nollywood Movies Awards)	Best Rising Star (Male)	Lucky Ejim	Nominated

== See also ==
- List of Nigerian films of 2014
