= Destination Biafra =

1982 novel by Buchi Emecheta

- Author: Buchi Emecheta
- Language: English
- Series: Heinemann African Writers Series
- Genre: Literary fiction
- Set in: Biafra/Nigeria
- Publisher: Heinemann
- Publication date: 1982
- Publication place: UK
- Pages: 246 (first edition)
- ISBN: 9780435909925
- OCLC: 8309889
- Preceded by: The Moonlight Bride
- Followed by: Naira Power

Destination Biafra is a 1982 novel by Nigerian writer Buchi Emecheta, first published in London by Allison & Busby. It is considered to be Emecheta's personal account of the Biafra War. Destination Biafra was republished in paperback on 1 March 1994 by Heinemann Educational Books as part of the African Writers Series.

== Plot ==
Debbie Ogedemgbe, the corrupt Nigerian government minister's daughter, defies her parents by joining the army. Her contradictory sentiments about her role as a traditional Nigerian woman and her desire to participate actively in Biafra's war reflect the struggle going on around her.

== Legacy ==
Reassessing the novel in 2023, Ijedike Jeboma concluded: "Since the publication of Destination Biafra, many Nigerian writers have made contributions to Biafran war literature. In recent years, a large proportion of these writers have done so with limited personal experience of the Biafran war, from their residences outside Nigeria. From Chimamanda Ngozi Adichie to Uwem Akpan, the mining of collective inherited memories has become central to the re-telling of the Biafra story.... Still, Emecheta’s Destination Biafra stands front and centre as a guiding light; an incredibly ambitious project from which many ideas should be explored and adapted."
