= Rele Art Gallery =

Nigerian art gallery

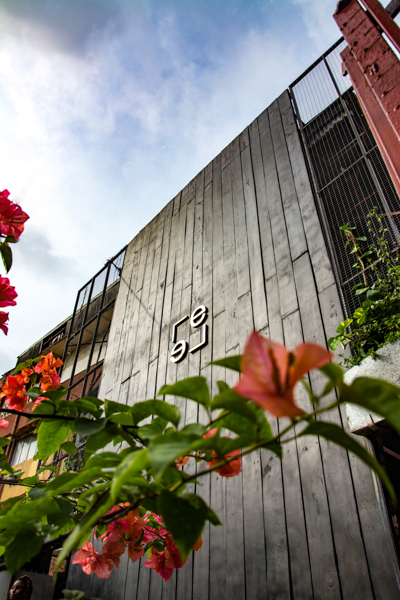

Rele Gallery is a contemporary art space and gallery in Lagos, Nigeria. It is on Military Street, Onikan Lagos and on Victoria Island, Lagos.

== History ==
Rele was founded by Adenrele Sonariwo, art curator and former accountant, former employee of PricewaterhouseCoopers.

The gallery is part of the Rele Arts Foundation, a nonprofit organisation.

In 2021, the gallery opened a location in Los Angeles, California. It is the first African gallery to open in Los Angeles.

== Artists ==
Rele Gallery has featured a number of Nigerian-based international artists including Victor Ehikhamenor and Kelechi Amadi-Obi.

In 2022, Neec Nonso was featured as a member of Rele's Young Contemporary.

== Exhibitions and shows ==
- The Atlantic Triangle (April 2017) curated by Alfons Hug
- Her Story (2017)
- Tech Meets Art (2015–present) in collaboration with Samsung.
- Selense (2016)
- Strip (May 2015)
- Exhibition curated by the Video Arts Network Lagos & David Dale Gallery (2015) supported by British Council

The gallery also participated in Art Hamptons Fair (July 2013).
