= Neec Nonso =

Nigerian artist (born 1990)

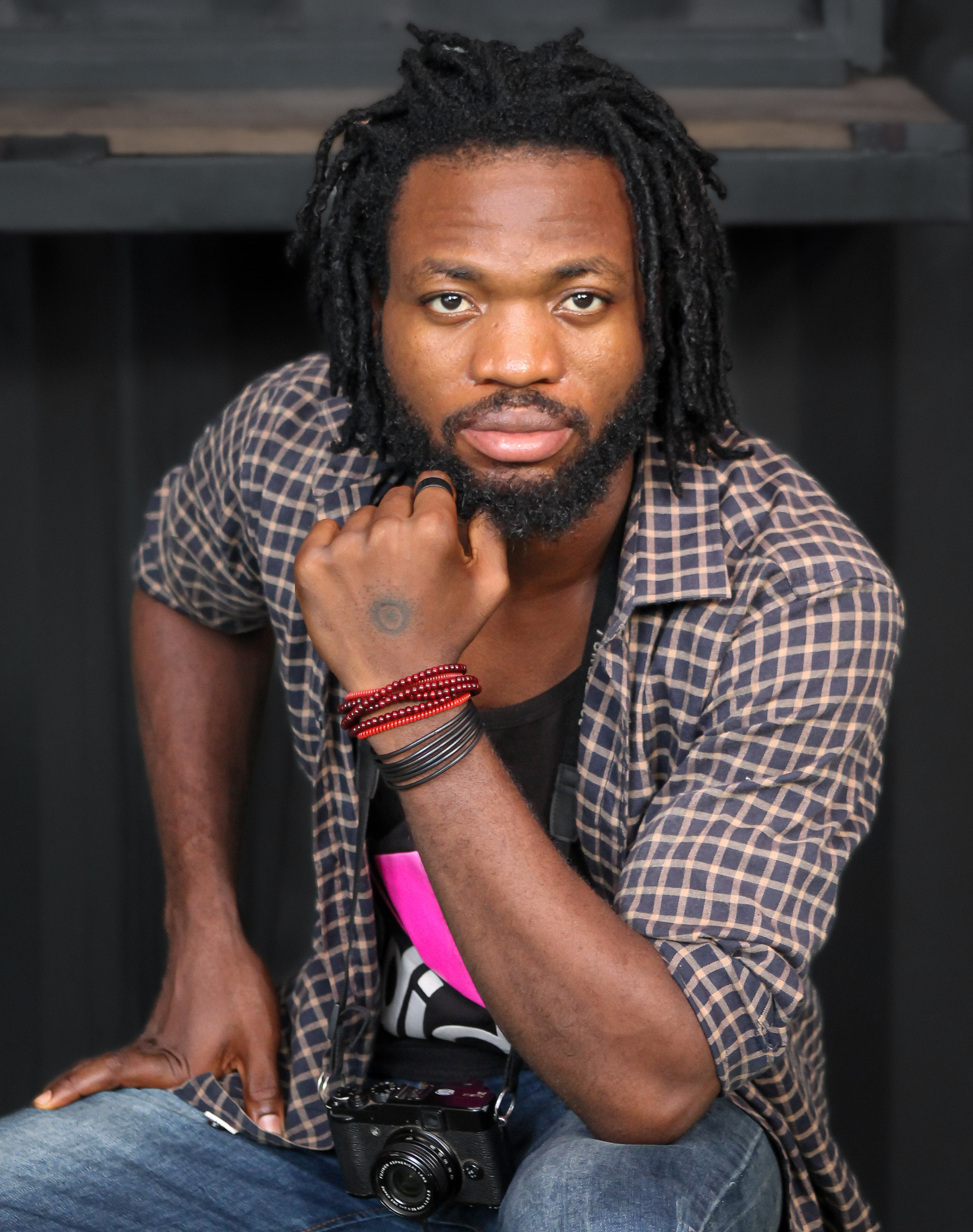
- Born: 24 October 1990 (age 35)
- Known for: Photography, Augmented Reality, Film-making
- Notable work: Transcendental Signified, Christmas and Clothes
- Website: www.neecnonso.com

Neec Nonso (born 24 October 1990) is a Nigerian artist who works in the fields of augmented reality (AR), photography, and filmmaking.

He is known for his work titled Christmas and Clothes, which focuses on childhood memories of Christmas celebrations in Nigerian villages.

Neec is also recognized for his AR pieces that explore themes such as belief in reincarnation, the afterlife, and cultural taboos and myths about death. He is a member of 1884 photo collective, a pan-African photo movement; and African Photojournalism Database (APJD) which is a joint project by the World Press Photo Foundation and Everyday Africa.

== Early life and education ==
Neec Nonso was born in Aguleri, Anambra State, later moved with his family to Lagos. He studied theatre and film studies at the University of Nigeria, Nsukka.

In 2019, he emerged as the winner LagosPhoto portfolio review and was awarded a one-year residency programme with African Artists Foundation, Lagos. The Prince Claus foundation announced him as one of the 12 artists reimagining the future of their cities as part of the mentorship programme in 2023.

In 2025, Neec Nonso was announced the winner of the "ATLAS: Another Nigeria" photography competition with his image entitled "for the new to come the old must go". Organised by the Republic journal in collaboration with the Lagos Photo, the recognition came with a $2,500 cash prize, professional mentorship, and exhibition at the Lagos Photo Festival 2025.

Neec is an alumnus of 2022 Rele young contemporaries and a finalist of Art-X Lagos.

== Awards ==
- 2025: "ATLAS: Another Nigeria" Photography Competition, The Republic Journal and LagosPhoto
- 2023: Prince Claus Mentorship Award
- 2022: Vantage Point Photography Award, Sharjah Art Foundation
- 2019: Lagos photo portfolio review
- 2016: My Nigeria Photo Contest, Travel-next-door, Nigeria

== Exhibitions ==
Neec has participated in several exhibitions. Here follows a selection

=== Group exhibition ===
- A pot of hot soup, Brunei Gallery/SOAS, London.
- Obscura, The world today 18+, Metaverse.
- 2022 Young Contemporaries, Rele Gallery Lagos.
- Good things come in threes, Rele Gallery Los Angeles.
- Wa na wari, Wa na wari Art space, US.
- Yanga, African Artist Foundation, Lagos

=== Solo exhibition ===
- Transcendental Signified, Rele Gallery
