= Double Yoke =

1982 novel by Buchi Emecheta

- Author: Buchi Emecheta
- Language: English
- Genre: fiction
- Set in: Nigeria
- Publisher: George Braziller
- Publication date: 2 September 1982
- Media type: Print (hardcover)
- Pages: 163 pp (1st edition)
- ISBN: 978-0-8076-1128-9 (1st edition)
- OCLC: 567508653
- Preceded by: The Rape of Shavi

Double Yoke is a 1982 novel written by Nigerian writer Buchi Emecheta, first published in the UK by Ogwugwu Afor. It was published in the United States on 2 September 1982, by George Braziller.

== Plot summary ==
The story emphasises the life of students and lecturers in most Nigerian universities. The novel is set in the University of Calabar. Ete Kamba, a young boy who is expected to become a man of substance meets Nko at a party for Arit, her cousin, a girl who had graduated from her hairdressing apprenticeship program. On their way back to Nko's house, Ete forces himself on Nko. However, she does not resist. Ete refuses to marry Nko, stating that he cannot marry someone who is not a virgin. Eventually, Ete Kamba reveals Nko's predicament to Professor Ikot, who takes advantage of the situation: Nko must sleep with Professor Ikot in order to pass her exam. Nko agrees but Ete Kamba finds out and beats the professor. Nko realises that she is now pregnant with the professor's child.

== Reception ==
D. A. N. Jones wrote in the London Review of Books: "Buchi Emecheta’s novel is dedicated to her 1981 students at the University of Calabar. Double Yoke is a tale of student life at that university and evidently the teacher has learned a great deal from her pupils, pulling out passages from their essays and exercises to make her own point about their lives and ideas. ... Miss Emecheta is happy to halt her pacey narrative and tell the reader bluntly what she thinks of her characters and life in general. This technique, the sermon in parenthesis, is acceptable in skilful story-tellers, like Miss Emecheta." In 1985, Double Yoke was considered among "new and noteworthy" titles by C. Gerald Fraser of The New York Times.
