= The Bride Price =

1976 novel by Buchi Emecheta

- First UK edition
- Author: Buchi Emecheta
- Cover artist: Taiwo Jegede
- Publisher: Allison & Busby (UK); George Braziller (US)
- Publication date: 1976; 50 years ago
- Publication place: Nigeria
- Media type: Print (hardback)
- Pages: 168
- ISBN: 978-0-85031-165-5
- OCLC: 2912824
- Preceded by: Second Class Citizen
- Followed by: The Slave Girl

The Bride Price is a 1976 novel by Nigerian writer Buchi Emecheta. It was first published in the UK by Allison & Busby, and in the US by George Braziller. Centered on women during the Nigerian postcolonial era, Emecheta dedicated the book to her mother, Alice Ogbanje Emecheta.

== Plot ==
In the city of Lagos, Nigeria, the Igbo Aku-nna and her brother, Nna-nndo, are bid farewell by their father Ezekiel, who says he is going to the hospital for a few hours – their mother, Ma Blackie, is back home in Ibuza, performing fertility rites. It becomes apparent that he is much sicker than he lets his children know, and he dies three weeks later. They have the funeral the day before Ma Blackie arrives; she takes them back to Ibuza with her, as she now becomes the wife of Ezekiel's brother.

The family is problematic in Ibuza – Ma Blackie has some of her own money, and so her children receive much more schooling than other children in the village, particularly the children of her new husband's other wives. Aku-nna is blossoming, though she is thin and passive, and starts to attract the attention of young men in the neighborhood, though she has not yet started to menstruate. Her stepfather Okonkwo, who has ambitions of being made a chief, begins to anticipate a large bride price for her. Meanwhile, she has begun to fall for her teacher Chike, who in turn has developed a passion for her. Chike is the descendant of slaves – when colonization started, the Igbo often sent their slaves to the missionary schools so they could please the missionaries without disrupting Igbo life, and now the descendants of those slaves hold most of the privileged positions in the region.

Chike's inferior background means it is unlikely that Okonkwo will agree to let him marry Aku-nna, although his family is wealthy enough to offer a generous bride price. When Aku-nna begins menstruating – the sign that she is now old enough to get married – she at first conceals it in order to stave off the inevitable confrontation. When she finally reveals that she has her period, young men come to court her and Okonkwo receives several offers. One night, after she finds out that she has passed her school examination (meaning she might become a teacher, earning money by means other than the bride price) she and the other young women of her age-group are practicing a dance for the upcoming Christmas celebration when men burst in and kidnap her.

The family of an arrogant suitor with a limp, Okoboshi, has kidnapped her to be his bride in order to "save" her from the attentions of Chike. On her wedding night, she lies and tells Okoboshi that she is not a virgin and has slept with Chike; he refuses to touch her. The next day, word of her disgrace has already spread around the village when Chike rescues her and the two elope, fleeing to Ughelli where Chike has work. The two begin a happy life together, marred by her guilt over her unpaid bride price – Okonkwo, furious, refuses to accept any of the increasingly generous offers made by Chike's father, and has gone so far as to divorce Ma Blackie and torture a doll made in Aku-nna's image.

When Aku-nna feels sick, she goes home. There, she is not sure if she will have a baby. Soon the doctor in Chike's oil company confirms that Aku-nna will have a baby. Later on when she feels sick and screams, Chike brings her to the hospital. There, Aku-nna dies in childbirth. Chike christens his baby Joy.

== Background ==
The Bride Price was the first novel Emecheta wrote, but its original version was lost when her husband threw the manuscript on the fire – which act of destruction proved to be the last straw in an abusive marriage that she subsequently left. She later re-wrote the novel, and it was published in London in 1976 by Allison & Busby, following the company's publication of Second Class Citizen (1974).

== Critical reception ==
The Bride Price was favourably reviewed on both sides of the Atlantic. Peter Tinniswood, writing in The Times, called the novel "highly impressive", concluding: "In the last decade or so there has been some exciting literature coming from Black Africa, and this book is in the very top rank of the movement. I recommend it warmly and without reservation." Anthony Thwaite wrote in The Observer: "Buchi Emecheta is an unstrivingly poignant writer, who convinces through plain narrative authenticity and a feeling for character." Hilary Bailey remarked in Tribune that the novel "manages to pull off the trick of bringing the reader through to the realities common to us all". Susannah Clapp in The Times Literary Supplement noted that the quality of the novel "depends less on plot or characterization than on the information conveyed about a set of customs and the ideas which underlay them", while Valerie Cunningham in the New Statesman called it "a captivating Nigerian novel lovingly but unsentimentally written, about the survival of ancient marriage customs in modern Nigeria" adding that this book "proves Buchi Emecheta to be a considerable writer."

The review in The New Yorker commented: "The clash of Christian and African cultures, of generations, of ancient and modern pieties, and of group custom and the individual will are all vividly portrayed in this pure, fluid novel.... The author has a plain, engaging style and manages to convey all the lushness, poverty, superstition, and casual cruelty of a still exotic (to Western readers) culture while keeping her tale as sharp as a folk ballad."
