= Peju Alatise =

Nigerian artist, writer and poet (born 1975)

- Born: 1975 (age 50–51); Lagos, Nigeria
- Occupation: Multimedia artist
- Awards: 2017 FNB Art Prize

Peju Alatise (born 1975) is a Nigerian artist, poet, writer, and a fellow at the National Museum of African Art, part of the Smithsonian Institution. Alatise received formal training as an architect at Ladoke Akintola University in Oyo State, Nigeria. She then went on to work for 20 years as a studio artist.

Her work was exhibited at Venice Biennale’s 57th edition, themed Viva Arte Viva (Long Live Art). Alatise, along with two other Nigerian artists, Victor Ehikhamenor and Qudus Onikeku, were the first Nigerians to appear at the art exhibition. Her work was a group of life-size figures based on the life of a servant girl.

Alatise was a recipient of the 2017 FNB Art Prize.

Alatise cites artist David Dale, Bruce Onabrakpeya, Nike Monica Davies, Susanna Wenger, Nigerian and Yoruba culture as influences of her artwork.

== Early life ==
Alatise was born in 1975 in Lagos, Nigeria. She and her seven siblings grew up in a traditional Muslim family.

Alatise first considered art as a career at the age of 15, when she viewed an exhibition by Nigerian artist David Dale. When Alatise expressed her plan to become an artist, her father discouraged the idea, feeling that art was a waste of time; he wanted his daughter to choose an occupation that was more economically stable. Her mother, however, supported Alatise's artistic pursuits, as a spiritualist had foretold that Alatise would one day be wealthy. Despite his original disapproval, her father was eventually won over to the idea before he died.

Before pursuing art, Alatise studied architecture at a university, valuing the way it taught her to see and think logically. During her college years Alatise began to explore her interests in art by visiting Jakande, a crafts market in Lagos. There, she practiced various media, including painting, sculpting, and jewelry making.

== Career ==
She began her art career with painting, then branched out to be a multimedia artist, using beads, cloth, resin and other materials. She now works in sculpture, using her art to make statements about social issues, while incorporating literature, symbolism and traditional Yoruba mythology into her works. Alatise is also involved in bead making, visual arts consultancy, creative writing, leather accessory designing, and interior designing.

According to Vogue, "Alatise defines her artistic practice as a search for truth and to this end much of her work centres on women in Nigeria and on the political and religious issues at the heart of the country." Strongly believing that an artist should depict the world she lives in, Alatise strives to visualize social issues of her country and personal experience. Considering the strongly held social views of gender roles in Nigeria, it is not surprising that much of Alatise's artwork focuses on gender inequality and women's rights. Using her art to make statements about social issues, Alatise acts as a creative social activist through art. Alatise's work expands on Afro-feminist views by fracturing the male mould of Modern African culture. Over the years, Alatise's work has put her on a pedestal with many other distinguished Nigerian female artists like Nike Davies Okundaye, Lara Ige-Jacks, and Ndidi Dike.

Although Alatise started her artistic career by exploring three-dimensional illusions on two-dimensional surfaces, she also creates through literature. This combined love of art and literature is reflected in one of her most stunning pieces, "Flying Girls". Exhibited in Venice Biennale, this piece consisted of eight life-size girls with wings, and, according to fashion and entertainment website BellaNaija, is "based on the story of a ten-year-old girl who works as a housemaid in Lagos while dreaming of a realm where she is free, who belongs to no one but herself, and can fly." BellaNaija also states that this piece "addresses the injustice of the present, but through a vision of a safer imaginary future, especially for little girls." Additionally, this work addresses the issue of child labor.

Alatise more directly combines her multidisciplinary skills in her 2013 exhibition, titled Wrapture. This piece combined short stories with sculptures, creating a visual narrative.

Alatise has authored two novels, her debut novel being entitled Orita Meta. A leading voice for contemporary African artists, she has used her work as a medium and voice to address societal ills and changing the stereotypical narrative and ideology. Alatise is a fellow at the National Museum of African Art, part of the Smithsonian Institution.

=== Art auctions ===
Alatise's 2011 work titled "Ascension" was sold at N4.4 million in Nigeria's Art Auction, this made her work the best priced among emerging artists.

== Awards ==
Alatise received the 2017 FNB Art Prize at the launch of the 10th instalment of the FNB Joburg Art Fair. This art fair is located in Johannesburg, South Africa.

== Other accomplishments ==
Her most recent concerns include creating artist residencies in Morocco and Turkey. These are places where artists can live and work on their various art projects while being near other artists with similar interests. In this way, Alatise focuses on supporting up-and-coming artists.

In an interview with Aljazeera, Alatise described her goals in these words: "When I look at the standard in which I want my work to be, I look at what is happening on a global scale. The artists who inspire me are [those] whose works engage in a way that either inform or inspire you, [that] talk to the true essence of the human in you and I want my work to do the same."

Peju founded the ANAI Foundation – a non-profit foundation dedicated to the development of visual arts in Nigeria, offering sponsored training programs for artists.

== Exhibitions ==
- She has exhibited her works in various countries, including the 2014 Casablanca Biennale in Morocco, Cooper Gallery for African and African American Art Harvard University, 2017, Resignification of Black Body, 2016 in Museo Bardini – Florence. Familiar boundaries - Infinite possibilities exhibition, August Wilson Centre, Pittsburgh, USA. Curator- Kilolo Luckett, October 2018–March 2019. EVA Ireland Biennial 2018. Curator- Inti Guerrero. Manifesta 12, Resignification of Black bodies. Palermo, Italy, Curator- Awam Ampka (New York University), June 2018. Péju Alatise Memoirs of the forgotten, 2019 Sulger Buel Gallery, London. Intricacies: Fragment & Meaning, Aicon Gallery, New York, 2019
- Material Witness (2012): Nike Art Gallery, Lagos. Photography by Marc C and Yinka Akingbade
- WRAPTURE: a Story of Cloth (September 12–November 16, 2013): Art Twenty-One, Lagos. Photography by Marc C and Yinka Akingbade
- Casablanca Biennale 2014: Ifitry residency, Essaouira, 2013
- 1:54 CONTEMPORARY AFRICAN ARTFAIR (2014): Somerset House, London
- 57th Venice Biennale (2017): August Wilson Centre for Arts, 2018
- Prelude, pretexts and presumptions (2018): Arthouse Contemporary, Lagos
