= Head Above Water (book) =

1986 autobiography by Buchi Emecheta

Head above Water
- Author: Buchi Emecheta
- Cover artist: Victor Ehikhamenor
- Language: English
- Series: African Writers Series
- Genre: Non-fiction, Autobiography
- Set in: Nigeria, London
- Publisher: Heinemann publisher
- Publication date: 1986
- Publication place: Nigeria
- Media type: Print (hardcover)
- Pages: 229 pp (first edition)
- ISBN: 9780950817736 (first edition)
- OCLC: 59798996

Head above Water is a 1986 non-fiction book by Nigerian novelist Buchi Emecheta. It was published in 1986 in the African Writers Series by Heinemann and has been described as "anecdotal autobiography."

== Plot summary ==
Head above Water is an autobiography by Buchi Emecheta. It discusses her days in Nigeria, down to her life in London at the time as a renowned author.
