= Rosina Umelo =

Nigerian writer (born 1930)

Rosina Umelo (born Rosina Martin, 1930) is a Nigerian writer. She is known for her short stories, children's books and her young adult fiction. She also has published under the pen name Adaeze Madu.

== Life ==
Rosina "Rose" Martin was born in Cheshire, England, and educated at Bedford College, University of London. She married Nigerian John Umelo in 1961, having met him on the London Underground. In 1965, the two moved to Nigeria. She taught Latin at Queens School, Enugu, until the outbreak of the Nigerian Civil War (1967–70). She became a citizen of Nigeria in 1971 through marriage. She worked as a principal and created English-language curriculum materials. Later, Umelo became a school administrator. Umelo has six children.

Umelo collected 12 of her short stories for adults into The Man Who Ate the Money (1978), five of which won awards. Nancy J. Schmidt, writing for Africa Today, called Umelo's writing in The Man Who Ate the Money "fresh," even though her subject matter dealt with themes that are common in African fiction. Umelo also wrote for a popular young adult series published by Macmillan, called the Pacesetters Series. Umelo also created works for young adults for the series "Heart Beats", published by Chelsea House Publishers in the 1990s.

In 1967, the Eastern Region of Nigeria, whose capital was Enugu, seceded as the newly declared nation of Biafra. The Umelo family fled from their home in Enugu to John Umelo's home village in the heart of Biafra. During the war, Rosina kept notes on her observations, which she wrote up as a narrative immediately after the war, which ended in 1970 with at least a million civilians dead. This account, called "A World of our Own," remained unpublished until 2018, when it formed the core of a book, Surviving Biafra: A Nigerwife's Story (Hurst Publishers, London), co-authored with anthropologist S. Elizabeth Bird.

Later in her life, Umelo worked at the International Institute of Tropical Agriculture, Ibadan. In 2023, she lived in Dagenham in the United Kingdom.

== Bibliography ==
- Who Are You?. Macmillan. 2002. ISBN 9780333992500.
- The House in the Forest. Macmillan. 1996. ISBN 9780333653494.
- Waiting for Tomorrow. Macmillan. 1995. ISBN 9780333641460.
- Soldier-Boy. Macmillan. 1994. ISBN 9780333615928.
- Dark Blue is for Dreams. Macmillan. 1994. ISBN 9780333610510.
- Loveletters. Macmillan. 1994. ISBN 9780333627426.
- Forever. Heinemann Heartbeats. 1994. ISBN 9780435934415.
- Sara's Friends. Macmillan. 1993. ISBN 9780333602133.
- No Problem!. Macmillan. 1993. ISBN 9780333587225.
- Days of Silence. Macmillan. 1993. ISBN 9780333581162.
- Striped Paint. Macmillan. 1992. ISBN 9780333568651.
- Please Forgive Me. Chelsea House Heartbeats. 1993. ISBN 9780791029374.
- Something to Hide. Macmillan. 1986. ISBN 9780333398975.
- Madu, Adaeze (1986). Broken Promise. Paperback Publishers. ISBN 9789782432643.
- Finger of Suspicion. Macmillan. 1984. ISBN 9780333362990.
- Felicia. Macmillan. 1978. ISBN 9780333253472.
- The Man Who Ate the Money. Oxford University Press. 1978. ISBN 9789781540837.
- Surviving Biafra: A Nigerwife's Story. Hurst. 2018. ISBN 978-1849049580.

== Awards ==
- Cheltenham Literary Festival Prize (1973)
- Nigerian Broadcasting Corporation short-story competition prize (1972 and 1974)
- BBC Story Prize (1966)
