= American Heart Association =

American non-profit health organization

- Founded: June 10, 1924
- Founders: Paul Dudley White, Dr. Lewis A. Conner, Dr. Robert H. Halsey, Dr. James B. Herrick, Dr. Hugh McCulloch, and Dr. Joseph Sailer
- Type: Nonprofit
- Tax ID no.: 13-5613797
- Legal status: 501(c)(3)
- Headquarters: 7272 Greenville Avenue, Dallas, Texas
- Services: "To be a relentless force for a world of longer, healthier lives"
- Key people: Dr. Manesh R. Patel (Volunteer President); Nancy Brown (CEO)
- Website: heart.org

The American Heart Association (AHA) is a nonprofit organization in the United States that funds cardiovascular medical research, educates consumers on healthy living and fosters appropriate cardiac care in an effort to reduce disability and deaths caused by cardiovascular disease and stroke. They are known for publishing guidelines on cardiovascular disease and prevention, standards on basic life support, advanced cardiac life support (ACLS), pediatric advanced life support (PALS), and in 2014 issued the first guidelines for preventing strokes in women. The American Heart Association is also known for operating a number of highly visible public service campaigns starting in the 1970s, and also operates several fundraising events.

Originally formed in Chicago in 1924, the American Heart Association is currently headquartered in Dallas, Texas. It was originally headquartered in New York City. The American Heart Association is a national voluntary health agency. The mission of the organization, updated in 2018, is "To be a relentless force for a world of longer, healthier lives." The organization's work can be divided into five key areas: research; heart and brain health; equitable health; advocacy; and professional education and development.

== History ==
=== 1924–1980s ===
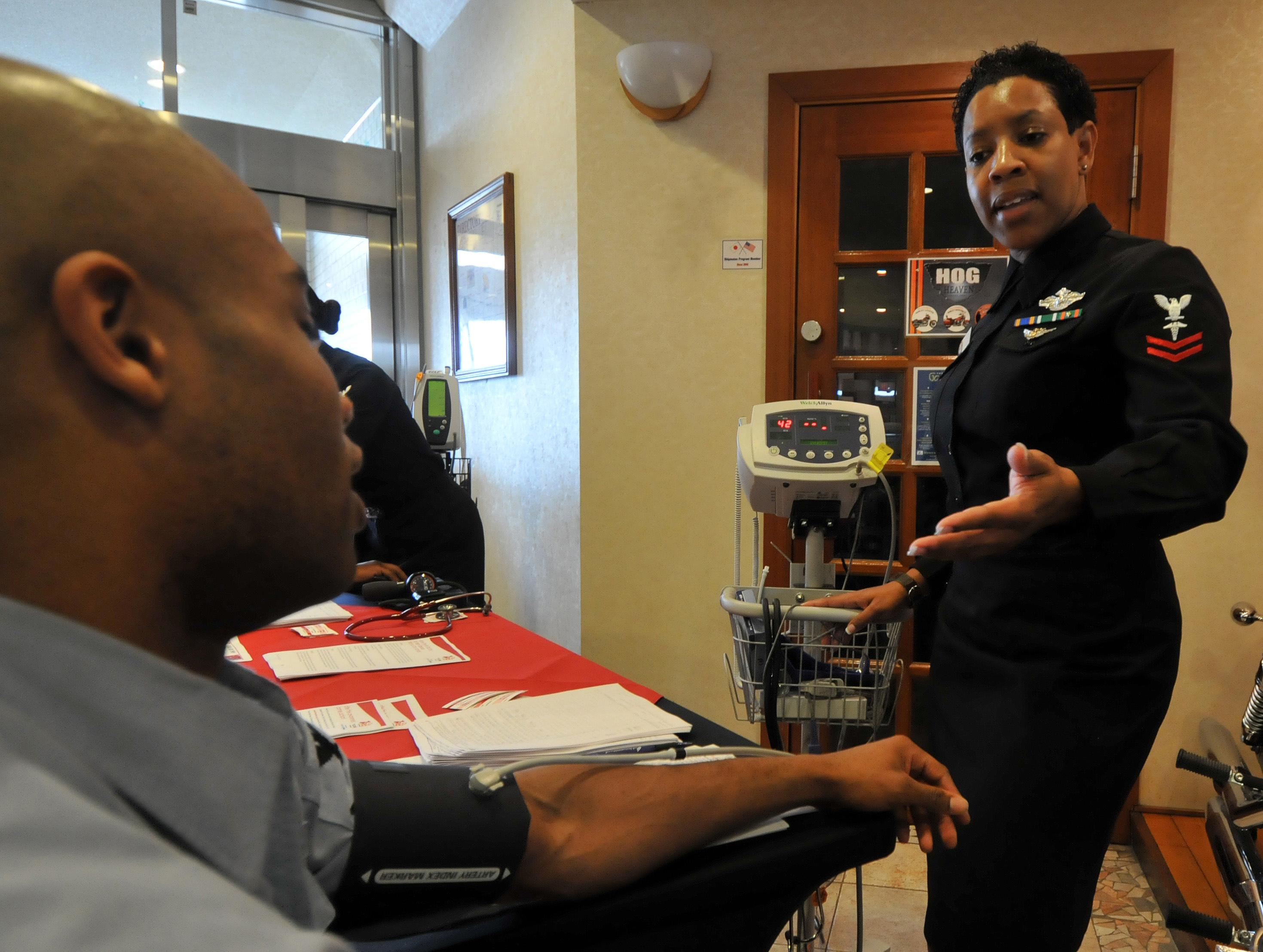
A health promotion coordinator at Fleet Activities Sasebo, from Augusta, Ga., checks a sailor's blood pressure.

In 1924, cardiologists Paul Dudley White, Hugh D. McCulloch, Joseph Sailer, Robert H. Halsey, James B. Herrick, and Lewis A. Conner, formed the Association for the Prevention and Relief of Heart Disease as a professional society for doctors. In 1949, the American Heart Association received $1.5 million (equivalent to $17–20 million today) from individual listeners of a nationwide radio contest. The fundraiser, called The Walking Man, aired on the popular program Truth or Consequences, which was sponsored by Duz dishwashing liquid (a product of Procter & Gamble). More than two million letters were submitted by listeners, each averaging a donation of 70 cents. The outpouring of support marked a major turning point for the Association, enabling it to fund scientific research and launch national public health initiatives. Since 1949, it has funded over $6.1 billion in cardiovascular, cerebrovascular, and brain health research. The organization, now known as the American Heart Association, consists of over 33 million volunteers who are dedicated to improving heart health and reducing deaths from cardiovascular diseases.

In the 1950s and 1960s, the American Heart Association published several reports and guidelines focused on recommended lifestyles to improve cardiovascular health. This included a 1957 report that said: (1) Diet may play an important role in the pathogenesis of atherosclerosis, (2) The fat content and total calories in the diet are probably important factors, (3) The ratio between saturated and unsaturated fat may be the basic determinant, and (4) A wide variety of other factors besides fat, both dietary and non-dietary, may be important.

In 1956, the American Heart Association issued its first scientific statement on smoking and heart disease, noting evidence of a possible link between tobacco use and cardiovascular deaths. The Surgeon General's Report on Smoking and Health, during the 1960s, later recorded that the AHA was among several medical organizations to publicly identify smoking as an important health hazard associated with heart and lung disease.

By 1961, these findings had been strengthened, leading to the new 1961 American Heart Association recommendations: (1) Maintain a correct body weight, (2) Engage in moderate exercise, e.g., walking to aid in weight reduction, (3) Reduce intake of total fat, saturated fat, and cholesterol. Increase intake of polyunsaturated fat, (4) Men with a strong family history of atherosclerosis should pay particular attention to diet modification, and (5) Dietary changes should be carried out under medical supervision. These recommendations continued to become more precise from 1957 to 1980, but there maintained "a general coherence among them".

In 1966, research supported by the American Heart Association provided evidence linking high blood pressure to reduced life expectancy and increased complications such as heart enlargement and vascular damage. The findings helped establish hypertension as a major risk factor for cardiovascular disease.

=== 1990s–2000s ===
In 1994, the Chronicle of Philanthropy, an industry publication, released the results of the largest study of charitable and non-profit organization popularity and credibility. The study showed that the American Heart Association was ranked as the fifth "most popular charity/non-profit in America" of over 100 charities researched, with 95 percent of Americans over the age of 12 choosing the Love and Like A lot description categories.

In 1998, the AHA created the American Stroke Association to help prevent strokes, improve treatments, and maximize recoveries. In 2003, the two organizations created the Get With the Guidelines (GWTG)-Stroke program. It is a voluntary registry that hospitals can use to receive the latest scientific treatment guidelines. The program also collects data on patient characteristics, hospital adherence to guidelines, and patient outcomes.

In 2004 the American Heart Association launched the "Go Red for Women" campaign specifically targeting women, with information about risks and action they can take to protect their health. All revenues from the local and national campaigns go to support awareness, research, education and community programs to benefit women.

In 2008, the AHA recommended "hands only" CPR as an option for bystanders who want to help keep a cardiac arrest victim alive. This method removes the practice of performing rescue breaths and depends solely on chest compressions.

On November 30, 2009, the American Heart Association announced a new cardiac arrest awareness campaign called Be the Beat. The campaign has sought to use fun ways to teach 12- to 15-year-olds the basics of cardiopulmonary resuscitation. The AHA has also taught them how to use an automated external defibrillator [AED].

=== 2012–present: Recent events and activities ===
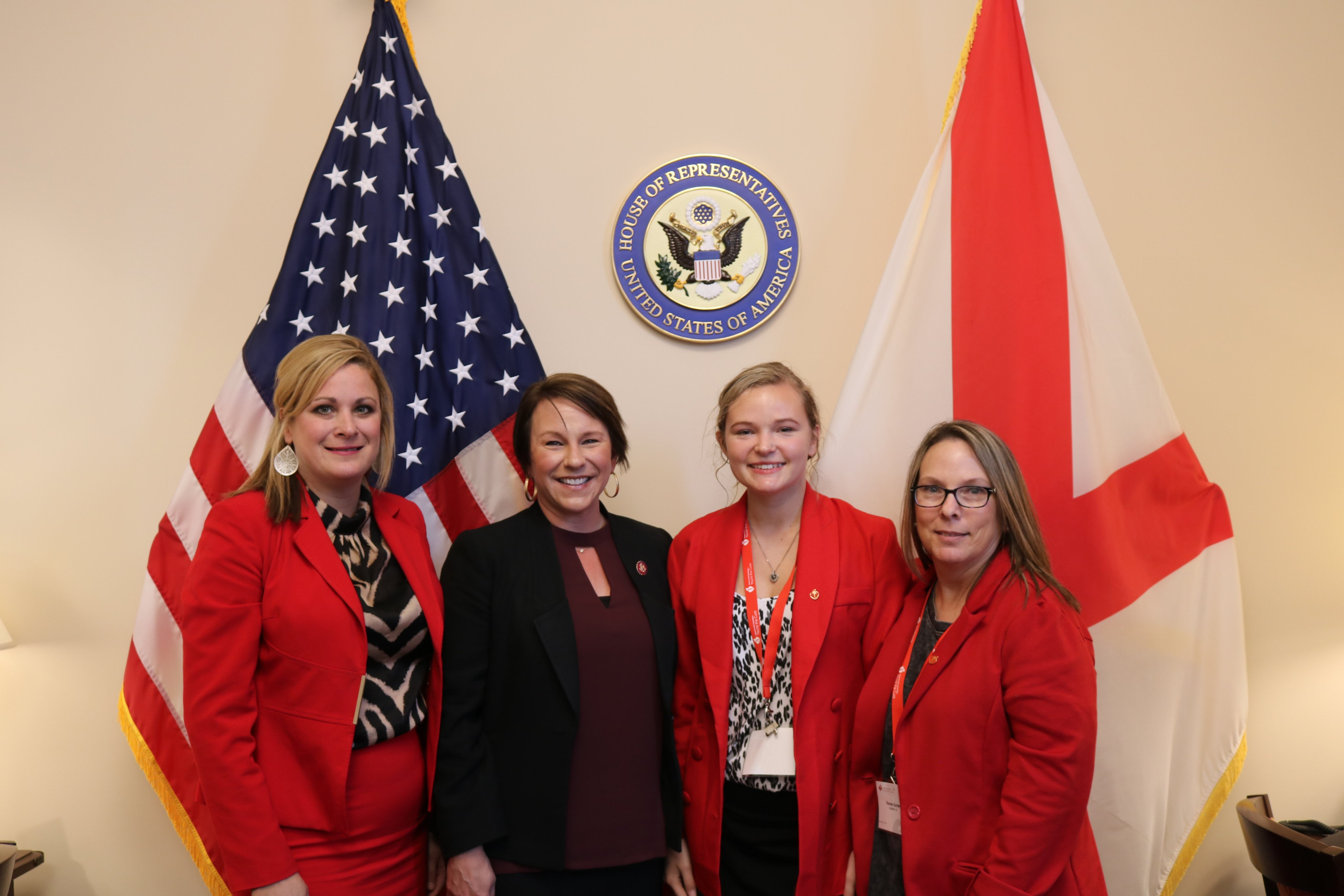
Representatives from the American Heart Association meeting with US Representative Martha Roby

In 2012, the AHA renewed its focus on hands-only CPR by carrying out a national campaign to educate more people on how to perform this method. Jennifer Coolidge was a spokesperson for the campaign.

It also carried out a campaign in 2012 to educate more people on how to carry out hands-only CPR. The 2012 campaign, which began in New York City, had Jennifer Coolidge as the spokesperson.

In 2013, the American Heart Association issued a joint guideline recognizing obesity as a disease and recommending its treatment by weight loss.

In 2014, the American Heart Association issued its first guidelines for preventing strokes in women. Just as heart attack systems differ between men and women, men and women also face different stroke risks. For women, the guidelines for preventing strokes focus on factors such as birth control, pregnancy, and depression.

In 2015, the American Heart Association officially endorsed the Tobacco 21 campaign, urging local, state and national governments to raise the tobacco and nicotine sales age from 18 to 21.

In 2016, the American Heart Association, Verily Life Sciences, and AstraZeneca invested $75 million in the One Brave Idea program. The money was awarded to institutions researching new biomarkers, such as genetic and molecular factors, that put individuals at risk for atherosclerosis. It was hoped that the research would help the AHA reach its goals of increasing cardiovascular health by 20% and reducing cardiovascular mortality by 20% by 2020.

In November 2017, the American Heart Association and the American College of Cardiology, along with nine other professional groups, issued new guidelines lowering the threshold for diagnosing high blood pressure from 140/90 mm Hg to 130/80 mm Hg. The change, the first in fourteen years, was intended to help identify cardiovascular risks earlier and encourage intervention before medication is needed. The following year in 2018, the organizations jointly released updated cholesterol management guidelines recommending the use of coronary artery calcium (CAC) scoring by clinicians to determine proper management of plaque buildup.

In 2018, the American Heart Association and American College of Cardiology issued new guidelines for clinicians on the management of cholesterol as a way to reduce risk for heart attack and stroke. Newly included in the guidelines is a recommendation to use the coronary artery calcium score if healthcare providers are having difficulty deciding if a patient could benefit from statin medications or should focus solely on lifestyle modifications. The cholesterol guidelines were last updated in 2013.

In 2020 and 2021, the annual flagship meeting of the organization was held virtually owing to the COVID-19 pandemic and resumed as an in-person conference in 2022.

In June 2024, the American Heart Association celebrated its 100 year anniversary of its founding. With the official celebration of its founding, the association was recognized as the nation's oldest and largest voluntary organization dedicated to fighting heart disease and stroke. The association held CPR training, where in many places the first hundred or so people to participate in the 5-minute training were given take-home CPR kits.

In August 2025, the American Heart Association issued a science advisory on ultra-processed foods (UPFs), which reviewed research associating high consumption of ultra-processed foods with cardiovascular disease and other chronic conditions. The advisory noted differences in the nutritional quality of foods classified as ultra-processed.

In March 2026, the American Heart Association updated its dietary guidance for cardiovascular health. The guidance outlined nine features of a hearth-healthy dietary pattern, including recommendations concerning fruits and vegetables, whole grains, protein sources, dietary fats, sodium, added sugars, and food processing.

A 2026 survey by the Annenberg Public Policy Center found that the American Heart Association was the most trusted source of public health information after respondents' own physicians.

== Focus areas ==
Some of the American Heart Association's research, campaigns, and other work are included here.

=== Research ===
Since 1949, the association has funded over $6.1 billion in cardiovascular, cerebrovascular, and brain health research.

==== Strategically Focused Research Network (SFRN) ====
In 2014, the American Heart Association announced the Strategically Focused Research Network initiative to address "key strategic issues as determined by the AHA Board of Directors." Some of the topics focused on by SFRNs include hypertension, heart failure, heart disease, and health technologies and innovation.

=== Heart and brain health ===
==== Go Red for Women ====
The Go Red for Women campaign started in 2004 to raise awareness that women, and not only men, are vulnerable to heart disease. Between 2016 and 2021, the American Heart Association invested $20 million in the Go Red for Women Strategically Focused Research Network. The SFRN also received $52 million from the National Institutes of Health.

In 2017, the Go Red National Leadership Council was started to engage female executives in the campaign. Additional projects associated with the campaign include Research Goes Red and National Wear Red Day.

As of 2023, over 900,000 women have joined the campaign and receive updates on what they can do to improve their heart health. The campaign's social media channels had audiences of over 5.3 million in 2022.

Also in 2023, Miss America's Scholarship Foundation, a 501(c)(3), announced a 3-year commitment supporting the American Heart Association's women's initiative, Go Red for Women®. This initiative raises funds and awareness of women's heart health and brings fitness initiatives back to the national Miss America competition stage after the swimsuit portion was scrapped in 2018.

==== Be the Beat ====
The "Be the Beat" challenge encourages people to learn CPR.

==== American Heart Association CEO Roundtable ====
The CEO Roundtable was formed in 2013 and focuses on implementing evidence-based approaches to workplace health. In 2020, the CEOs of CVS Health, Walgreens Boots Alliance, and US Foods joined the association. In 2023, there were almost 50 Fortune 100 CEOs in the association.

==== American Stroke Association ====
In 1998, the association created the American Stroke Association to help prevent strokes, improve treatments, and maximize recoveries. In 2003, the two organizations created the Get With the Guidelines (GWTG)-Stroke program. It is a voluntary registry that hospitals can use to receive the latest scientific treatment guidelines. The program also collects data on patient characteristics, hospital adherence to guidelines, and patient outcomes.

The American Heart Association announced in October 2024 a grant aimed at improving heart health in rural communities by funding initiatives that address healthcare access and education. This support is expected to enhance resources for the prevention and treatment of heart disease in underserved areas.

==== R.A.P.I.D.O. Campaign ====
This 2023 Spanish-language campaign works to raise awareness among Hispanic Americans about stroke symptoms. The acronym stands for:

- Rostro caído (face drooping)
- Alteración del equilibrio (loss of balance or lack of coordination)
- Pérdida de fuerza en el brazo (arm weakness)
- Impedimento visual repentino (sudden vision difficulty)
- Dificultad para hablar (slurred or strange speech)
- Obtén ayuda, llama al 911 (get help, call 911)

The American Stroke Association has launched a new Spanish-language website, to educate Hispanic and Latino communities about stroke recognition, prevention, and recovery.

==== Know Diabetes By Heart ====
This is a joint campaign from the American heart Association and the American Diabetes Association. It works to raise awareness about the connection between diabetes and heart disease. The AHA reports that adults with diabetes are 2–4 times more likely to die from heart disease than adults without diabetes.

==== Check. Change. Control. ====
The "Check. Change. Control." program is an evidence-based hypertension management program that encourages blood pressure self-monitoring. In 2019 it was used by more than 315,000 people.

==== Nation of Lifesavers ====
This program was started in 2023 to "educate and prepare teens and adults to be confident to save life in a cardiac emergency." More than 350,000 people have out-of-hospital cardiac arrests each year, and this program wants to help improve their survival rate.

As part of National Wear Red Day, Buffalo Bills NFL player Damar Hamlin joined the American Heart Association at the Empire State Building to raise awareness about heart health. Hamlin, who survived a cardiac arrest on the field during a January 2023 game versus the Cincinnati Bengals, shared his experience of how a direct hit caused his heart to stop and emphasized the importance of heart health and emergency response. Cardiologist Dr. Joseph Puma highlighted that timely medical attention, including heart scans, can prevent life-threatening events, urging individuals to seek care if experiencing chest pain, shortness of breath, or other warning signs of heart issues.

In January 2025, Hamlin partnered with the American Heart Association to promote CPR and AED awareness through a PSA for the Nation of Lifesavers initiative. In the campaign, Hamlin emphasized the importance of immediate CPR and AED use, which he credited with saving his life.

==== Life's Essential 8 ====
Life's Essential 8 (LE8) are cardiovascular health measurements shared by the AHA. Previously the measurements were known as the LE7, but in 2022 the AHA added sleep health as an additional behavioral metric. The other metrics look at body weight, blood pressure, cholesterol, blood sugar, smoking, physical activity, and diet.

=== Equitable Health ===
The American Heart Association's 2024 Impact Goal states, "Every person deserves the opportunity for a full, healthy life. By 2024, as champions for health equity, the American Heart Association will advance cardiovascular health for all, including identifying and removing barriers to health care access and quality."

==== Social Impact Fund ====
The AHA's Social Impact Fund is a nationwide fund that provides financial resources for "evidence-based, community driven entrepreneurial solutions that help remove the social and economic barriers to equitable health and drive economic empowerment, healthy food access, affordable housing, access to quality healthcare, transportation, educational opportunities, and reduce recidivism."

Organizations that have received funding include:

- Sakan Community Resource
- Hmong American Farmers Association
- Better Futures Minnesota
- Sidekick Mobile Technologies
- Sweet Potato Patch

==== Hispanic Serving Institution Scholars Program ====
The HSI scholarship program is for any students enrolled in public health and healthcare focused programs at 18 Hispanic-serving colleges and universities. The program's goal is to increase representation in health-care. Students in the program are paired with volunteer mentors. They develop and present a research project that addresses basic, clinical, and educational science, receive a stipend, and participate in professional development workshops.

==== Historically Black Colleges and Universities Scholars Program ====
The HBCU Scholars program pairs students with a local American Heart Association researcher and was created to "support the development of minority scientists and healthcare professionals," and increase the number of minority students who apply and are accepted into biomedical and health science programs. Students and researchers study the impact of cardiovascular disease in their community, learn the factors affecting vulnerable populations, and sample areas of scientific inquiry. Students also receive financial stipends.

==== HeartCorps ====
HeartCorps is the American Heart Association's Public Health AmeriCorps program and is designed to drive equitable health in rural America. As of November 2022, twenty-six states participated in the program.

=== Advocacy ===
==== Clean Indoor Air ====
The American Heart Association supports legislation that creates smoke-free workplaces and public spaces. Starting in 2014, the AHA called for regulations for e-cigarettes to prevent young people from becoming addicted to nicotine, referencing studies that suggest that e-cigarettes can be a gateway drug.

==== No Surprise Medical Billing ====
The American Heart Association supports the No Surprises Act, stating it will keep costs and premiums down and encourage more people to seek care from healthcare professionals.

==== Food is Medicine Research Initiative ====
In 2022, the American Heart Association, the Rockefeller Foundation, Kroger, and other partners announced a plan to build a national Food is Medicine Research Initiative to help provide concrete evidence that food-as-medicine programs improve health.

In September 2023, the AHA partnered with the National Association of Chain Drug Stores, the American Cancer Society, the American Diabetes Association, and the Food is Medicine Institute at the Friedman School of Nutrition Science and Policy at Tufts University to launch Nourish My Health. It is a national public education campaign that promotes the protective health benefits of nutritious food.

==== You're the Cure ====
You're the Cure is the national grassroots network of the American Heart Association.

==== Sugary Beverage Opposition ====
In 2016, voters in San Francisco, Oakland, and Albany, California, approved ballot measures implementing a one-cent-per-ounce tax on sugar-sweetened beverages, while Boulder, Colorado, passed a similar tax at two cents per ounce. Public health advocates, including the American Heart Association, supported the measures as tools to reduce obesity and related health issues. The American Beverage Association opposed the taxes, arguing they are ineffective and burdensome to consumers, and emphasized industry efforts to reduce sugar content and promote healthier choices through education and product reformulation.

In 2017, the American Heart Association called for improving diet quality among SNAP recipients, including restricting the purchase of sugary drinks with benefits. Citing health risks and related cost savings, the proposal has gained support from some policymakers but faces opposition from retailers. Potential changes may be addressed in the upcoming Farm Bill reauthorization.

The American Academy of Pediatrics and the American Heart Association released a joint statement urging policies to reduce children's consumption of sugary drinks, including taxes, marketing restrictions, and clearer labeling. They cited health risks such as obesity and diabetes, while the American Beverage Association opposed the proposals, highlighting industry efforts to reduce sugar and promote consumer choice.

In 2024, in Santa Cruz, California, beverage industry companies spent $1.2 million opposing Measure Z, a local tax on sugary drink distributors. While the industry cites a 2018 state law banning such taxes, experts argue the tax is legal and that the ban may be unconstitutional. Measure Z aims to reduce sugary drink consumption and fund community programs, reflecting similar efforts in other California cities. Supporters see it as a way to restore local control and limit industry influence on public health policies.

In May 2025, Santa Cruz implemented a voter-approved tax of 2 cents per ounce on sugar-sweetened beverages, becoming the first California city to enact such a measure since a statewide moratorium on new local soda taxes was established in 2018. The measure was supported by the American Heart Association, which cited public health concerns and praised the city's efforts to counteract what it described as misinformation campaigns by the beverage industry.

=== Professional education and development ===
The American Heart Association publishes healthcare guidelines, statements, and performance measures. A small sample of these professional education and development resources include:

- Information to prevent strokes, improve treatments, and maximize recoveries
- Lifestyle recommendations to improve cardiovascular health
- Guidelines to prevent strokes in women
- High blood pressure definitions
- Management guidelines to reduce cardiovascular risk factors in adults with Type 2 diabetes
- Scientific statements on specific diseases
- Care guidelines for cardiovascular attacks
- Scientific statements looking at specific healthcare practices, such as shared decision-making

The AHA also holds an annual Scientific Sessions meeting, which covers several days and a number of medical/healthcare topics; and hosts an International Stroke Conference.

==== Second Century of Science Initiative ====
The Second Century of Science Initiative was announced in 2023 as part of the AHA's plans to celebrate its first 100 years. Under the Initiative, the AHA awarded $20 million in grants to over 100 scientists in the U.S. The grants were awarded in three categories: the Second Century Implementation Science Award, the Second Century Early Faculty Independence Award, and the Clinical Fellow Research Education Program

==== Get With the Guidelines ====
In 2003, the AHA and the American Stroke Association created the Get With the Guidelines (GWTG)-Stroke program. It is a voluntary registry that hospitals can use to receive the latest scientific treatment guidelines. The program also collects data on patient characteristics, hospital adherence to guidelines, and patient outcomes.

== Fellowship ==
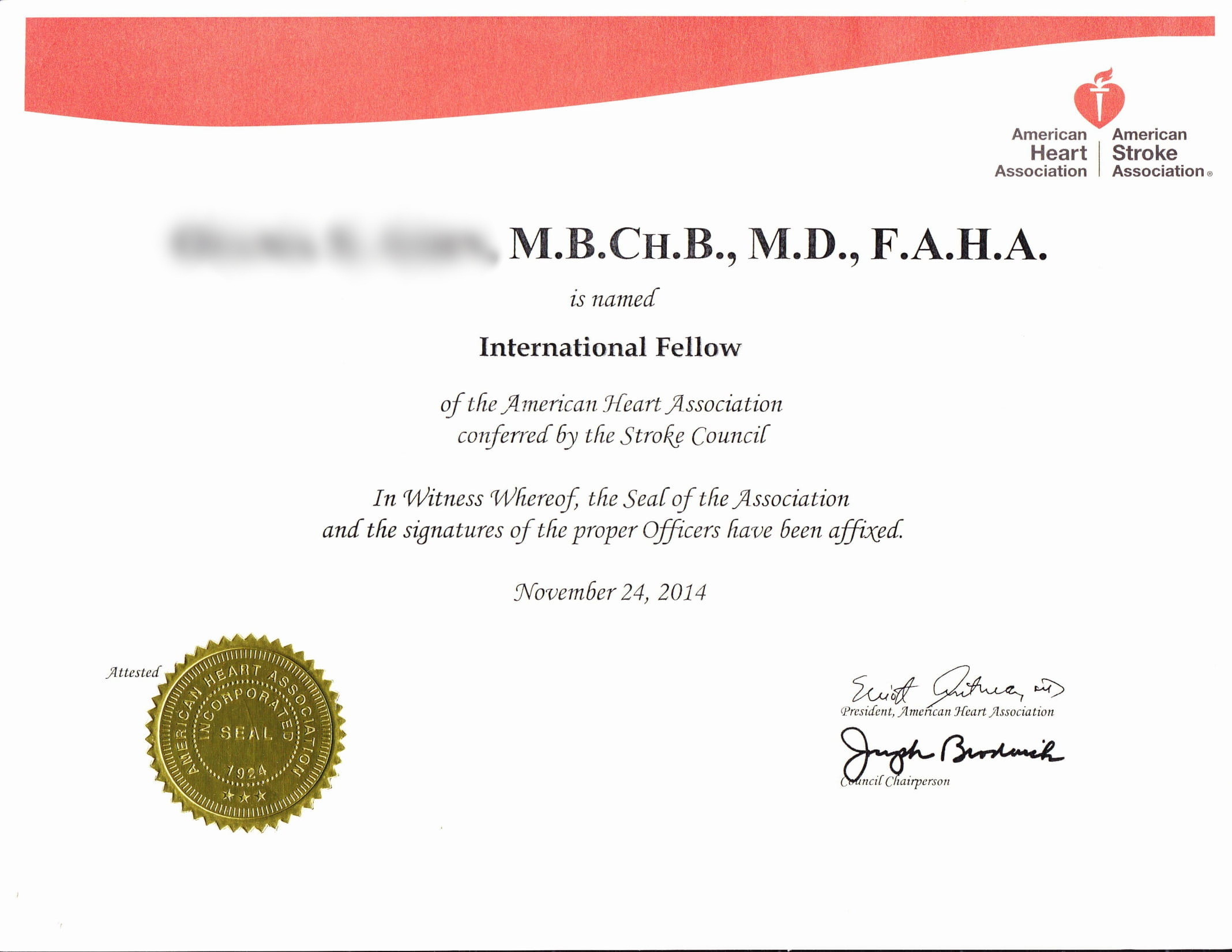
American Heart Association, Fellowship of the American Heart Association's Stroke Council

Fellowship is open to wide-ranged medical professionals (physicians, scientists, etc.) who demonstrate a major and productive interest in cardiovascular diseases and stroke. The association has 16 different councils. Members (at the Premium Professional or Premium Professional Plus level) of one of these councils can apply for Fellowship. All applicants from all councils will be evaluated against the same criteria. Fellows are entitled to use the post-nominal designation FAmerican Heart Association (Fellow of the American Heart Association), which reflects not only the professional stature of the Fellow but also their record of valuable service to the association and the council. In addition, American Heart Association fellowship offers several benefits; e.g., reduced subscription rates for all American Heart Association print journals and reduced registration fees for American Heart Association Scientific Sessions.

=== Key people ===
Nancy Brown has been the CEO of the American Heart Association since 2009.

Keith B. Churchwell served a one-year term as the volunteer president from July 1, 2024, until June 30, 2025.

Dr. Stacey E. Rosen was the volunteer president for American Heart Association, with her term starting on July 1, 2025 until June 30, 2026.

Beginning July 1, 2026, Dr. Manesh R. Patel became the acting volunteer president.

== Publications ==
=== Journals ===
The following journals are published by the American Heart Association:

- Hypertension
- Arteriosclerosis, Thrombosis, and Vascular Biology
- Stroke
- Circulation
- Circulation Research
- Circulation Arrhythmia and Electrophysiology
- Journal of the American Heart Association
- Circulation: Genomic and Precision Medicine
- Circulation: Cardiovascular Imaging
- Circulation: Cardiovascular Interventions
- Circulation: Cardiovascular Quality and Outcomes
- Circulation: Heart Failure
- Stroke: Vascular and Interventional Neurology
- Annals of Internal Medicine: Clinical Cases

=== CPR and ECC Guidelines ===
The American Heart Association publishes guidelines for cardiopulmonary resuscitation and emergency cardiovascular care. In 2025, the association issued updated CPR and ECC guidelines, replacing its 2020 recommendations. This update added new guidance on topics where previous recommendations had not existed

Standards and training programs associated with the guidelines include:

- Basic life support
- Advanced cardiac life support (ACLS)
- Pediatric advanced life support (PALS), co-branded with the American Academy of Pediatrics

== See also ==
- American College of Cardiology
- American Heart Association Paul "Bear" Bryant Awards
- American Heart Month
- Automated external defibrillator (AED)
- American Stroke Association
