= Barbara Kimenye =

British-born writer (1929–2012)

- Born: Barbara Clarke Holdsworth; 19 December 1929; Halifax, West Riding of Yorkshire, England
- Died: 12 August 2012 (aged 82); London, England
- Occupation: Writer
- Writing career
- Genre: Children's books
- Notable work: Moses series

Barbara Kimenye (19 December 1929 – 12 August 2012) was a British-born writer who became one of the most popular and best-selling children's authors in East Africa, where she lived from the 1950s. Her books sold more than a million copies, not just in Kenya, Uganda and Tanzania, but throughout English-speaking Africa. She wrote more than 50 titles and is best remembered for her Moses series, about a mischievous student at a boarding school for troublesome boys.

A prolific writer widely regarded as "the leading writer of children's literature in Uganda", Kimenye was among the first Anglophone Ugandan women writers to be published in Central and East Africa. Her stories were extensively read in Uganda and beyond and were widely used in African schools. Although born in England, Kimenye considered herself Ugandan.

== Early life and education ==
Barbara Clarke Holdsworth was born in Halifax, West Yorkshire, England, the daughter of a Jewish-born Catholic convert mother and a West Indian doctor father. She attended Keighley girls' grammar school, before moving to London to train as a nurse. There, she met many students from East Africa, and married Bill Kimenye, son of a chief from Bukoba in what was then Tanganyika. They moved to his home town on Lake Victoria in the mid-1950s. After the marriage broke up, she moved to Kampala, capital of the Uganda Protectorate.

In Kampala, she was reacquainted with many friends who had been some of the first Ugandan students in Britain. They were becoming the first leaders and professionals of what would soon be independent Uganda. She also became close to East Africa's emerging cultural scene, befriending writers and artists including Rajat Neogy and Ngũgĩ wa Thiong'o. The Kabaka of Buganda, Mutesa II of Buganda, invited her to work as a private secretary in his government. She lived near to the palace compound with her two sons, Christopher (Topha) and David (Daudi). During that time, her family became close to the royal family. She moved to Nairobi, Kenya, in 1965 to work on the Daily Nation and The East African Standard.

She lived in Nairobi until 1975 when, with both sons in England, she moved to London. There she worked for Brent Council as a race relations adviser, while continuing to write. She assiduously followed political developments in a disrupted Uganda and played an active role supporting exile groups opposed to the rule of Idi Amin, and later the second Milton Obote regime. In 1986, with the overthrow of Obote, she returned to Uganda. She spent a further three years in Kampala before deciding to relocate to Kenya, where she spent the next 10 years in semi-retirement.

In 1998, Kimenye finally settled back in London, where she lived happily and was much involved in community affairs in Camden. Her son Christopher died in 2005. Kimenye died in London in 2012, aged 82, survived by her son David and a granddaughter, Celeste.

== Writing ==
Kimenye always had a gift with words (she wrote her own newspaper as a child of 11) and became a journalist on the Uganda Nation newspaper. She developed a talent for storytelling, writing down the tales she told to children. Moving in 1965 to Nairobi, Kenya, to work on the Daily Nation and East African Standard, Kimenye was wooed by publishers who, post-independence, sought talented authors who wrote for and about African children. However, her first book, Kalasanda, for Oxford University Press (OUP), was a tale of Ugandan village life, and was followed by Kalasanda Revisited. It was after this that she turned her hand to writing for children and schools. Her first two stories, Kalasanda and Kalasanda Revisited, were successful. However, her salient legacy sits magnificently in the Moses series about a mischievous student at a boarding school for troublesome boys. Shortly before her death, she received news that the Moses series was about to be relaunched by OUP and also to be translated into Kiswahili.

== Published works ==
=== Non-fiction ===
- The Modern African Vegetable Cookbook. East African Educational Publishers. 1997. ISBN 978-9966466464.

=== Children's books ===
- Pretty Boy, Beware. East African Educational Publishers. 2004. ISBN 978-9966460158.
- The Winner and Other Stories. Kenya Literature Bureau. 1997. ISBN 9966442669.
- Kayo's House. Macmillan Education. 1996. ISBN 978-0333632376.
- Paulo's Strange Adventure. Chelsea House Publications. 1994. ISBN 978-0791031636.
- The Runaway Bride. MacMillan Education. 1994. ISBN 9780333618240.
- Taxi. Heinemann. 1993. ISBN 9780435893637.
- The Money Game. Heinemann. 1992. ISBN 9780435893606.
- The Smugglers. East African Educational Publishers. 1990. ISBN 9789966469144.
- Beauty Queen. East African Educational Publishers. 1988. ISBN 978-9966460141.
- Gemstone Affair. Evans Brothers. 1978.
- The Scoop. Nelson. 1978. ISBN 978-0175115914.
- The Runaways. Oxford University Press. 1973. ISBN 978-9966466464.
- Sarah and the Boy. Oxford University Press. 1972. ISBN 9780195720822.
- The Winged Adventure. Oxford University Press. 1969.
- Kalasanda Revisited. Oxford University Press. 1966.
- Kalasanda. Oxford University Press. 1965.

==== Moses Series ====
- Moses and the Movie. MacMillan Education. 1996. ISBN 9780333653470.
- Moses and the Man from Mars. East African Educational Publishers. 1991. ISBN 978-9966464002.
- Moses in a Mess. East African Educational Publishers. 1991. ISBN 978-9966466167.
- Moses and the School Farm. Oxford University Press (EA). 1987. ISBN 978-019-573859-9.
- Moses and the Raffle. Oxford University Press (EA). 1986. ISBN 978-019-573858-2.
- Moses in a Muddle. Oxford University Press (EA). 1976. ISBN 978-019-573852-0.
- Moses and the Penpal. Oxford University Press (EA). 1976. ISBN 978-0195720693.
- Moses on the Move. Oxford University Press (EA). 1971. ISBN 978-019-573856-8.
- Moses and the Kidnappers. Oxford University Press (EA). 1968. ISBN 978-019-573850-6.
- Moses and the Mildred. Oxford University Press (EA). 1968. ISBN 978-019-573851-3.
- Moses in Trouble. Oxford University Press (EA). 1968. ISBN 978-019-573853-7.
- Moses and the Ghost. Oxford University Press (EA). 1968. ISBN 978-019-573855-1.
- Moses and the Cramper. Oxford University Press (EA). 1968. ISBN 978-019-573854-4.
- Moses and Penpal. Oxford University Press (EA). 1968. ISBN 978-019-573857-5.
- Moses. Oxford University Press (EA). 1968. ISBN 978-019-573849-0.
