= Kehinde (novel) =

1994 novel by Buchi Emecheta

- Author: Buchi Emecheta
- Language: English
- Genre: Fiction
- Published: 1994
- Publisher: Waveland Press
- Publication place: Nigeria
- Pages: 144
- ISBN: 9781577664192

Kehinde is a 1994 novel by Buchi Emecheta. It tells the story of a British-Nigerian woman named Kehinde Okolo, her husband Albert, and their contemplation over returning to Nigeria from London. Albert yearns for a life of prominence in Nigeria, whereas Kehinde is pregnant and is reluctant to leave London. Eventually, the domineering Albert departs alone, and Kehinde is left to her own devices, and to decide whether or not to follow Albert.
