= Naira Power =

1982 novel by Buchi Emecheta

- Author: Buchi Emecheta
- Language: English
- Series: Pacesetter series
- Genre: Literary fiction
- Set in: Nigeria
- Publisher: Macmillan Publishers
- Publication date: 1982
- Publication place: Nigeria
- Pages: 108 (first edition)
- ISBN: 9780333336380
- OCLC: 11331334
- Preceded by: Destination Biafra
- Followed by: Adah's Story

Naira Power is 1982 novel by Nigerian writer, Buchi Emecheta. It was published, as part of the Pacesetter series of popular fiction published by Macmillan.

== Plot ==
Naira Power is a narrative about corruption in which the main character Ramonu wielded power over justice due to his riches. Everything went wrong when the power went off.
