= Gwendolen (novel) =

1989 novel by Buchi Emecheta

- Author: Buchi Emecheta
- Language: English
- Genre: Literary Fiction
- Publisher: HarperCollins Publishers Ltd.
- Publication date: 1989-11-23
- Media type: Print (paperback)

Gwendolen (United Kingdom title) is a 1989 novel by Nigerian writer Buchi Emecheta, also known by its United States title The Family. It is her tenth novel.

== Plot summary ==
Gwendolen, pet name June–June, is a young black Jamaican girl growing up with her maternal grandmother Naomi. Her African-ancestry parents Winston and Sonia Brillianton emigrate to England when she is still a child. Sonia does not claim her until Gwendolen is 11, paying for her passage to England.

In Jamaica Gwendolen is sexually abused by a middle-aged neighbour Uncle Johnny. She tells this secret to her grandmother, who confronts the man and reveals it to the rest of their neighbours, thus bringing shame to Gwendolen.

In England Gwendolen attends school and helps take care of her two younger brothers, Ronald and Marcus, and their youngest sister, Cheryl.

When her mother goes back to Jamaica for an extended visit to attend to her dead grandmother Naomi, Gwendolen is again sexually abused – this time by her father Winston. She becomes pregnant; however, it is believed that the baby belongs to Emmanuel, Gwendolen's teenaged Greek boyfriend. Gwendolen is institutionalized in a mental hospital after going hysterical, but she tells no one the parentage of her unborn child for fear that her father may be imprisoned. Coincidentally, Winston is killed in a work accident. After giving birth to a healthy daughter, Gwendolen names her "Iyamide", a Yoruba name meaning "My mother is here". Seeing their resemblance, Sonia then realizes her dead husband is the true father of Gwendolen's child.
