= In the Ditch (novel) =

1972 novel by Buchi Emecheta

- Author: Buchi Emecheta
- Language: English
- Genre: Literary fiction
- Set in: Nigeria, London
- Publisher: Allison & Busby
- Publication date: 1972; revised 1979
- Publication place: U.K.
- Media type: Print (paperback)
- Followed by: Second Class Citizen

In the Ditch is a 1972 novel written by Nigerian writer Buchi Emecheta. It was first published on New Statesman as a regular column then published in 1972 by Barrie and Jenkins, and in a 1979 revised edition by Allison & Busby in London, where her editor was Margaret Busby.

In 1994, the book was included in the Heinemann African Writers Series.

== Background ==
In the Ditch is the debut novel of writer Buchi Emecheta. The book is partly autobiographical and was inspired by Emecheta's personal experiences as a Nigerian woman who experienced poverty as a single mother. She stated that she felt the book was "[her] sixth child" and was born after she decided to write what she knew, basing her work on her real life experiences.

After Emecheta began writing about episodes from her own life, a friend suggested she pitch them to Richard Crossman, who was editor of the New Statesman at the time. Emecheta began typing up weekly "Observations" which she sent to Crossman, who published them as a regular column.

Emecheta's husband at the time attempted to undermine her writing and had destroyed her first manuscript, The Bride Price, which was later rewritten and published in 1976. Because of this, Emecheta ended up writing and publishing In the Ditch, about her life after separating from her husband, as her first novel.

In The Ditch deals with themes of racism, sexism, classism and poverty through the lens of Emecheta's experiences as an immigrant in the welfare system. In particular, it focuses on the systemic injustices faced by working-class women in Britain, who were subjected to domestic abuse and double standards at the societal level.

== Plot summary ==
The story is about Adah, a Nigerian who married a Londoner. Her husband decides to go back to Nigeria but the wife refuses. The man then leaves for Nigeria; abandoning his wife and five children in London. The wife now has to depend on state welfare and double jobs in order to survive with her children.
