= Mpalive Msiska =

Malawian academic

Mpalive-Hangson Msiska is a Malawian academic resident in London, England. He is a Reader Emeritus in English and Humanities at Birkbeck College, University of London, with research and teaching interests in critical and cultural theory as well as postcolonial literature, including African literature, Wole Soyinka and Chinua Achebe being notable subjects of his writing.

== Background ==
Mpalive Msiska studied in Malawi, Canada, Germany and Scotland, and previously taught at the University of Malawi, the University of Stirling and Bath Spa University, before becoming Reader in English and Humanities at Birkbeck University of London. He is a former council member of the Royal African Society and serves on the advisory board of the Caine Prize.

He has written many conference papers and journal articles, as well as books, among which are works on Wole Soyinka and Chinua Achebe. His 2007 publication Postcolonial Identity in Wole Soyinka is described as "a major and imaginative contribution to the study of Wole Soyinka, African literature, and postcolonial cultural theory and one in which writing and creativity stand in fruitful symbiosis with the critical sense." According to a review by Kate Haines: "Mpalive-Hangson Msiska compellingly reads Soyinka's creative and critical work in dialogue with cultural studies, using this to highlight the important contribution African critics and writers have made to the ways in which power is read and understood today." Msiska co-authored The Quiet Chameleon: A Study of Modern Poetry from Central Africa (1992), and was co-editor of Writing and Africa (1997).

He has been a judge of such literary prizes as the International Dublin Literary Award, the Caine Prize for African Writing and the Brunel University African Poetry Prize.

== Books ==
- (With Adrian A. Roscoe) The Quiet Chameleon: Modern Poetry from Central Africa, Hans Zell Publishers, 1992, ISBN 9780905450520.
- (Co-editor with Paul Hyland) Writing and Africa, Routledge, 1997, ISBN 9780582214187.
- Wole Soyinka (Writers and Their Work), Northcote House, 1998, ISBN 9780746308110.
- Postcolonial Identity in Wole Soyinka, Rodopi, 2007, ISBN 9789042022584.
- (With David Whittaker) Chinua Achebe's Things Fall Apart (Routledge Guides to Literature), Routledge, 2007, ISBN 978-0415344555.
- (Editor) Hargeysa Breeze: Collection of poetry for Hargeysa and Laas Geel, Hargeysa, Somaliland: Ponte Invisibile, 2017, ISBN 9788888934563.

== Selected shorter writings ==
- "Sexual Politics in Malawian Popular Fiction: The Case of Aubrey Kalitera's Why Father Why", Kunapipi, 1989.
- "What is Black-British Writing?", African Writing, October/November 2007.
- "Sam Selvon's The Lonely Londoners and the structure of Black metropolitan life", in Fassil Demissie (ed.), African Diaspora and the Metropolis: Reading the African, African American and Caribbean Experience, Routledge, 2010.
- "Imagined nations and imaginary Nigeria: Chinua Achebe's quest for a country", Journal of Genocide Research, 2014.
- "The novel and decolonization in Africa". In Gikandi, Simon (ed.), The Novel in Africa and the Caribbean since 1950, Oxford University Press, 2017.
- "Kujoni: South Africa in Malawi's National Imaginary", Journal of Southern African Studies, 2017.
- "Rethinking the future of Humanities in Africa and the question of epistemological agency", Journal of Humanities, 2017.
- "Colonialism, trauma and affect: Chinua Achebe's Arrow of God as Oduche's Return", Research in African Literatures, 2018.
