= Buchi Emecheta =

Nigerian writer (1944–2017)

Buchi Emecheta OBE
- Born: Florence Onyebuchi Emecheta; 21 July 1944; Lagos, Lagos State, Nigeria
- Died: 25 January 2017 (aged 72); London, England
- Education: Methodist Girls' School; University of London (B.Sc.)
- Occupation: Writer
- Notable work: In the Ditch (1972); Second Class Citizen (1974); The Bride Price (1976); The Slave Girl (1977); The Joys of Motherhood (1979)

Buchi Emecheta ( OBE; born Florence Onyebuchi Emecheta; 21 July 1944 – 25 January 2017) was a Nigerian writer, whose work includes novels, plays, autobiography, and children's books. She was best known for her 1974 novel, Second Class Citizen. Her other novels include The Bride Price (1976), The Slave Girl (1977), and The Joys of Motherhood (1979). Emecheta has been characterized as "the first successful black woman novelist living in Britain after 1948".

Born in Lagos, Nigeria, Emecheta wrote from her childhood experiences, where she explored child slavery, motherhood, female independence and freedom through education, and using them in her works, gained recognition from critics and honours especially with her debut novel, Second Class Citizen. Her works often explore the themes of culture, and tensions between tradition and modernity. Most of her early novels were published by Allison and Busby with Margaret Busby as her editor.

== Early life ==
Emecheta was born on 21 July 1944, in Lagos, Colonial Nigeria, to Igbo parents of Anioma descent. Alice Okwuekwuhe and Jeremy Nwabudinke Emecheta from Umuezeokolo Odeanta village in Ibusa, Delta State. Her father was a railway worker and moulder. Her mother, Alice Ogbanje Ojebeta Emecheta, was a former slave girl sold into slavery by her brother to a relative to buy silk head ties for his coming-of-age dance. When her mistress died, Ogbanje Emecheta returned home to freedom.

Emecheta completed her early childhood education at an all-girls' missionary school. At nine, she lost her father, who died of the complications from a wound which he contracted in the swamps of Burma, where he had been conscripted to fight for Lord Louis Mountbatten and the remnants of the British Empire. After a year, she received a fully funded scholarship to Methodist Girls' School in Yaba, Lagos, where she remained until the age of 16. During this time, her mother died, leaving Emecheta an orphan, with books and her imagination becoming her refuge.

== Marriage and personal life ==
In 1960, she married Sylvester Onwordi, a schoolboy to whom she had been engaged since she was 11 years old. Later that year, she gave birth to a daughter, and in 1961 their younger son was born.

Onwordi moved to London for his studies, and Emecheta joined him there with their first two children in 1962. In the next six years, she would give birth to five children; three daughters and two sons. According to Emecheta, her marriage was an unhappy and sometimes violent one; details of which she would incorporate in her autobiographical book, Second Class Citizen. To keep her sanity, Emecheta wrote in her spare time. However, her husband was deeply suspicious of her writing, and he ultimately burned her first manuscript, The Bride Price, which was eventually published in 1976. She had had to rewrite it after the earlier version was destroyed; as she later said, "There were five years between the two versions."

At the age of 22, pregnant with her fifth child, Emecheta left her husband. While working to support her children alone, she earned a B.Sc. (Hons) degree in sociology in 1972 from the University of London. In her 1984 autobiography, Head above Water, she wrote: "As for my survival for the past twenty years in England, from when I was a little over twenty, dragging four cold and dripping babies with me and pregnant with a fifth one—that is a miracle." She would go on to gain her PhD from the university in 1991.

== Writing career ==
Keeping a diary, Emecheta typed up episodes about her experiences of Black British life and sent them to the weekly New Statesman magazine, at the time edited by Richard Crossman, who in 1971 began to publish Emecheta's sketches in a regular column. A collection of these pieces became her first published book in 1972, In the Ditch (Barrie and Jenkins). This semi-autobiographical documentary novel chronicled the struggles of a main character named Adah, who is forced to live in a housing estate while working as a librarian to support her five children. Emecheta's second novel, Second-Class Citizen, which also drew on her own experiences, was published two years later (Allison and Busby, 1974). In 1979, a revised edition of In the Ditch was published by Allison and Busby, where both In the Ditch and Second Class Citizen were eventually published in one volume under the title Adah's Story (1983). These books introduced Emecheta's three major themes, which were the quest for equal treatment, self-confidence and dignity as a woman.

Her later works Gwendolen (1989, also published as The Family), Kehinde (1994) and The New Tribe (2000) differ in some way, as they address the issues of immigrant life in Great Britain. Most of her fictional works are focused on sexual discrimination and racial prejudice, informed by her own experiences as both a single parent and a black woman living in the United Kingdom.

From 1965 to 1969, Emecheta worked as a library officer for the British Museum in London. From 1969 to 1976, she was a youth worker and sociologist for the Inner London Education Authority, and from 1976 to 1978 she worked as a community worker in Camden, North London, while continuing to produce further novels at Allison and Busby, with Margaret Busby as her editor – The Bride Price (1976), The Slave Girl (1977), The Joys of Motherhood (1979) and Destination Biafra (1982) – as well as the children's books Titch the Cat (1979, based on a story by her 11-year-old daughter Alice) and Nowhere To Play (1980).

Following Emecheta's success as an author, she travelled widely as a visiting professor and lecturer. She visited several American universities, including Pennsylvania State University, Rutgers University, the University of California, Los Angeles, and the University of Illinois at Urbana-Champaign. From 1980 to 1981, she was senior resident fellow and visiting professor of English at the University of Calabar, Nigeria. From 1982 to 1983, Emecheta, together with her son Sylvester, ran the Ogwugwu Afor Publishing Company, producing her own work under the imprint, beginning with Double Yoke (1982). She received an Arts Council of Great Britain bursary, 1982–83, and was one of Granta magazine's "Best of Young British Novelists" in 1983. In 1982, she lectured at Yale University, and the University of London. She became a Fellow at the University of London in 1986.

Over her career, Emecheta worked with many cultural and literary organizations, including the Africa Centre, London, and with the Caine Prize for African Writing as a member of the Advisory Council.

== Death ==
Emecheta suffered a stroke in 2010, and her last years were marked by increasing disability and illness. She died in London on 25 January 2017, aged 72.

== Awards and recognition ==
Emecheta won the 1978 Jock Campbell Prize by the New Statesman. She was on Granta|s Best of Young British Novelists in 1983. She became a member of the British Home Secretary's Advisory Council on Race in 1979.

In September 2004, Emecheta appeared in the "A Great Day in London" photograph by the British Library, featuring 50 Black and Asian writers who have made major contributions to contemporary British literature. In 2005, she was conferred as an Officer of the Order of the British Empire for her services to literature. She received an honorary doctorate of literature from Fairleigh Dickinson University in 1992.

== Legacy ==
In 2017, Emecheta's son Sylvester Onwordi announced the formation of the Buchi Emecheta Foundation – a charitable organisation promoting literary and educational projects in the UK and in Africa – which was launched in London on 3 February 2018 at the Brunei Gallery, SOAS, together with new editions of several of her books published by Onwordi through his Omenala Press. Among participants in the "Celebrating Buchi Emecheta" day-long event – "a gathering of writers, critics, artists, publishers, literature enthusiasts and cultural activists from all over the world, including London and other parts of the U.K., France, Germany, U.S., Canada, Nigeria, Ghana, Kenya, South Africa, and the Caribbean" – were Diane Abbott, Leila Aboulela, Carole Boyce Davies, Margaret Busby, James Currey, Louisa Uchum Egbunike, Ernest Emenyonu, Akachi Ezeigbo, Kadija George, Mpalive Msiska, Grace Nichols, Alastair Niven, Irenosen Okojie, Veronique Tadjo, Marie Linton Umeh, Wangui wa Goro, and Bibi Bakare-Yusuf.

Emecheta features at number 98 on a list of 100 women recognised in August 2018 by BBC History Magazine as having changed the world.

In March 2019, Camden Town Brewery launched a football kit using artwork featuring "some of the most inspiring female icons to have influenced the brewery's home borough of Camden".

On 21 July 2019, which would have been Emecheta's 75th birthday, Google commemorated her life with a Doodle.

In October 2019, a new exhibition space in the library for students at Goldsmiths, University of London, was dedicated to Buchi Emecheta, marked by a reception with short talks by Goldsmiths warden Frances Corner and the Head of Library Services, Leo Appleton, preceding an address by Margaret Busby.

In October 2021, Emecheta's second novel, Second Class Citizen, was reissued as a Penguin Modern Classic, as was In the Ditch in 2023.

== Works ==
Novels

- In the Ditch (1972)
- Second Class Citizen (1974)
- The Bride Price (1976)
- The Slave Girl (1977)
- The Joys of Motherhood (1979)
- The Moonlight Bride (1981)
- Destination Biafra (1982)
- Naira Power (1982)
- The New Tribe (2000)
