= Desmond Ovbiagele =

Nigerian film director

- Born: Lagos, Nigeria
- Education: University of Lagos; Imperial College, London
- Occupations: Director; screenwriter; film producer
- Years active: 2011–present
- Known for: Render to Caesar; The Milkmaid
- Awards: See below
- Website: desmondovbiagele.com

Desmond Ovbiagele is a Nigerian film director, screenwriter, and producer known for films with social and political themes. A former investment banker with Citigroup and Standard Chartered, Ovbiagele transitioned from finance to filmmaking.

His debut feature film, Render to Caesar (2014), became Nigeria's first locally-produced film selected for official competition at the FESPACO Film Festival in Burkina Faso. His sophomore feature in 2020, The Milkmaid, a drama inspired by the insurgency in northeastern Nigeria, garnered widespread international acclaim. It was selected as Nigeria's official entry amongst the list of submissions to the 93rd Academy Awards for Best International Feature Film — the country's first ever successful Oscar entry in the category. It also went on to win five African Movie Academy Awards from eight nominations, including Best Film, Best Film in an African Language and the National Film and Video Censors Board (NFVCB) Award for Best Nigerian Film. He also won Best Director at the 2021 Best of Nollywood Awards, and has been recognized by the United Nations and the Pan African Film Festival in Los Angeles.

== Filmography ==
- Render to Caesar - 2014
- The Milkmaid - 2020
