= George Braziller =

American publisher (1916–2017)

- Born: February 12, 1916; Brooklyn, New York, U.S.
- Died: March 16, 2017 (aged 101); Manhattan, New York, U.S.
- Occupation: Publisher
- Known for: Founder of George Braziller, Inc.

George Braziller (February 12, 1916 – March 16, 2017) was an American book publisher and the founder of George Braziller, Inc., a firm known for its literary and artistic books and its publication of foreign authors.

== Life and career ==
Born in Brooklyn, New York, on February 12, 1916, Braziller was first employed as a shipping clerk, during the Great Depression. In 1941, George and Marsha Braziller founded the "Book Find Club", which was smaller than the Book of the Month Club but exceedingly successful, "with a reputation for seriousness of purpose." They then began the "Seven Arts Book Society" in 1951 and in 1955 they began to publish their own books. The Braziller publishing firm is located at 277 Broadway, Suite 708, in Manhattan, New York City. When Braziller travelled to Europe in the late 1950s, he was in Paris during the May 1958 crisis in France brought about by the Algerian War of Independence. (Note: The reference in the 2005 Brooklyn Rail interview to "May 1968" must be an error, since Braziller goes on to state that La Question came out while he was in Paris, and that book's US publication by him was also in 1958.) Henri Alleg's book La Question, an autobiographical account of imprisonment and torture in Algiers, which Braziller brought back from that trip and published in English-language translation, was his firm's first big success in the United States, with an introduction written by Jean-Paul Sartre.

While I was there, a book came out [La Question]. I got the book, took it back to America, got a hold of Richard Howard to translate it, brought the book out overnight, and we sold 10,000 copies. Just like that we became famous. Those were really exciting times in Paris. I remember you'd go to the corner café, and there were artists like Max Ernst, Giacometti, Calder, and then the writers, poets, playwrights, dramatists like Camus, Michaux, Ionesco, Dürrenmatt ... Those were the early years, when you would say "only in America" could you start a book club with only 25 bucks and move it up to 100,000 members and then start a publishing house.

— George Braziller, Brooklyn Rail interview.

In 2011, George Braziller retired at the age of 95. His son Michael Braziller, of Persea Books, became publisher and editorial director while George's elder son Joel Braziller became secretary-treasurer and director of permissions. With a small team they maintain the Braziller tradition with new series and a rich backlist.

Braziller died in Manhattan, New York, on March 16, 2017, at the age of 101.

== Book series ==
Book series published by George Braziller have included:

- The American Culture Series
- The American Image Series
- The Arts of Mankind
- The Braziller Series of Poetry
- The Great American Artists Series
- The Great Draughtsmen Series
- The Great Fresco Cycles of the Renaissance
- Great Religions of Modern Man
- The Masters of World Architecture Series
- New Directions in Architecture
- Planning and Cities
- Vision + Value Series
- World Landscape Art & Architecture Series

Beginning in 1968, Braziller also published an implicit series of "excellent editions of partial facsimiles" of medieval manuscripts.

Book series published by Michael Braziller have included:

- The Braziller Series of Australian Poets
