= Allison & Busby =

British publishing house established in 1967

Allison and Busby
- Founded: 1967; 59 years ago
- Founders: Clive Allison; Margaret Busby
- Country of origin: England
- Headquarters location: London
- Distribution: Turnaround Publisher Services (UK) Baker & Taylor Publisher Services (US)
- Key people: Susie Dunlop (Publishing Director)
- Publication types: Books
- Official website: www.allisonandbusby.com

Allison & Busby (A & B) is a publishing house based in London established by Clive Allison and Margaret Busby in 1967.

== Early years ==
In 1965, Clive Allison (15 June 1944–25 July 2011) and Margaret Busby (born 1944) met at a party in Bayswater when both were undergraduates; he was President of the Oxford Poetry Society and she the editor of a literary magazine at London University. Busby later remembered, "[a]s the party ended, we continued talking and walking late into the night, and by the time we parted company had already decided on a course of action that would shape the rest of our lives: we would start a publishing house to produce poetry, not in the expensive elitist hardback volumes in which it traditionally appeared, but as cheap paperbacks that even people like us could afford."

Two years later, in May 1967, Allison & Busby was launched. At the time Busby was the UK's youngest and the first black woman publisher. In 1969, they set up office in a friend's flat in Soho; the first book published after that date was The Spook Who Sat by the Door by the African-American author Sam Greenlee, which was rejected by numerous publishers in both the US and UK. Allison's then-wife Lyn van der Riet also worked for the company in the ensuing years, as did Lavinia Greenlaw, who went on to become a respected poet and novelist.

== Since 1987 ==
The company was acquired by W. H. Allen Ltd in 1987, was subsequently part of Virgin Publishing, and has since "evolved and thrived under various independent managers", including Peter Day and David Shelley. Margaret Busby left the company in 1987; Clive Allison stayed on for several more years. A & B is now owned by Spanish publisher Javier Moll's Editorial Prensa Ibérica.
