= List of awards and honours received by Chimamanda Ngozi Adichie =

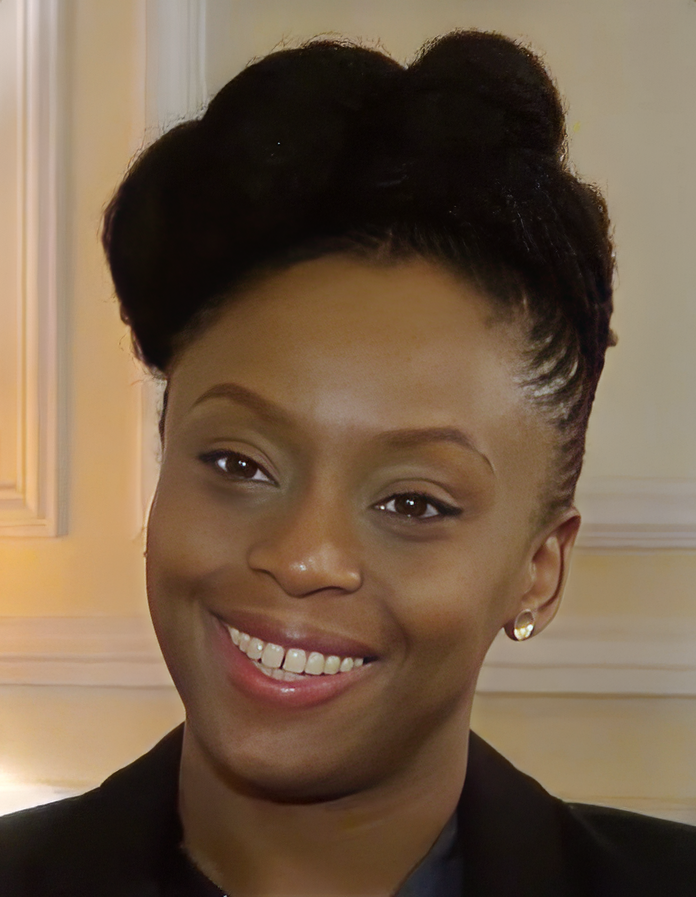
Adichie during the presentation of her book, Americanah, in 2015

Chimamanda Ngozi Adichie is a Nigerian author. She has won numerous accolades for her works, including general literature prizes and academic honours. Her short stories have garnered multiple awards including the O. Henry Award for "The American Embassy" and BBC National Short Story Award for "That Harmattan Morning". Adichie's first novel, Purple Hibiscus, won the Best First Book category of the Commonwealth Writers' Prize, and the Hurston/Wright Legacy Award for Best Debut Fiction in 2005. Since the paperback publication of her second novel Half of a Yellow Sun in 2007, The Guardian reported that it had sold only 187,000 copies, yet won the Women's Prize for Fiction – which was then the Orange Broadband Prize for Fiction – for which it competed against a book by a Man Booker Prize winner (Kiran Desai's The Inheritance of Loss) and a US bestseller (Anne Tyler's Digging to America). Along with Ernest Hardy, Harryette Mullen, and Alberto Ríos, she also won the PEN Beyond Margins Award. Her third novel, Americanah, won the National Book Critics Circle Award for Fiction in 2013. Her short story collection, The Thing Around Your Neck, was nominated for the Dayton Literary Peace Prize in 2010 and her book-length essay Dear Ijeawele, or A Feminist Manifesto in Fifteen Suggestions won the PEN Pinter Prize, and the Grand Prix de l'héroïne Madame Figaro for its French translation. Adichie's fourth novel Dream Count was longlisted for the Women's Prize for Fiction in 2025.

Adichie's early career awards include The Future Awards Africa for Young Person of the Year and MacArthur Foundation's "genius grant", both in 2008. In 2013, she was listed in the "100 Most Influential Africans" by New African; CNN named her among the "Leading Women of 2014"; Time named her in its 100 Most Influential People in 2015; the fashion magazine Vanity Fair listed her in the "International Best Dressed List" of 2016. In November 2019, she became the first Nigerian and first African woman to receive the United Nations Global Leadership Award for which she was cited as "using literature and storytelling to connect with people across generations and cultures on issues of gender and racial equality and being a leader on the frontlines of global progress"; in September 2019, she was awarded the "Prism of Reason", a citizens' award, in Kassel, Germany for "her literary contributions and her advocacy for human rights and diversity". Later awards include the Action Against Hunger humanitarian award in 2018 for her "significant contributions in the humanitarian field" and the Belle van Zuylenring in 2020 for her "contributions to humanity through her literary works and her public engagements which have played huge roles in effecting change and a better understanding of issues such as identity and feminism". In 2022 Adichie rejected the Order of the Federal Republic, a national honour by President Muhammadu Buhari.

Academic bodies have bestowed multiple honours on Adichie. She has received honorary degrees from many universities, among them Eastern Connecticut State University, Yale University, Johns Hopkins University, University of Edinburgh, Duke University, Georgetown University, and the University of Johannesburg. In 2022, Adichie was awarded the W. E. B. Du Bois Medal, Harvard University's highest honour. Her other honours include election into the American Academy of Arts and Sciences and American Academy of Arts and Letters, both in 2017.

== Literature ==
General literature
Year	Work	Award	Category	Result
2002	You in America	Caine Prize for African Writing	—	Shortlisted
2002	The Tree in Grandma's Garden	Commonwealth Short Story Competition	—	Highly; Commended
2002	That Harmattan Morning	BBC National Short Story Award	—	Won
2002	Half of a Yellow Sun	David T. Wong International Short Story Prize	—	Won
2003	The American Embassy	O. Henry Award	—	Won
2004	Purple Hibiscus	Booker Prize	—	Longlisted
2004	Purple Hibiscus	Hurston/Wright Legacy Award	Debut Fiction	Won
2004	Purple Hibiscus	John Llewellyn Rhys Prize	—	Shortlisted
2004	Purple Hibiscus	Orange Prize for Fiction	—	Shortlisted
2004	Purple Hibiscus	YALSA Best Fiction for Young Adults	—	Selection
2005	Purple Hibiscus	Commonwealth Writers' Prize	First Book (overall)	Won
2005	Purple Hibiscus	Commonwealth Writers' Prize	First Book (Africa)	Won
2006	Half of a Yellow Sun	National Book Critics Circle Award	Fiction	Finalist
2007	Half of a Yellow Sun	Anisfield-Wolf Book Award	Fiction	Won
2007	Half of a Yellow Sun	British Book Awards	Richard & Judy Best Read of the Year	Shortlisted
2007	Half of a Yellow Sun	Commonwealth Writers' Prize	Best Book (Africa)	Shortlisted
2007	Half of a Yellow Sun	Hurston/Wright Legacy Award	Fiction	Finalist
2007	Half of a Yellow Sun	James Tait Black Memorial Prize	Fiction	Finalist
2007	Half of a Yellow Sun	Orange Broadband Prize for Fiction	—	Won
2007	Half of a Yellow Sun	PEN Beyond Margins Award	—	Won
2008	Half of a Yellow Sun	International Dublin Literary Award	—	Longlisted
2009	Half of a Yellow Sun	International Nonino Prize	—	Won
2009	The Thing Around Your Neck	Frank O'Connor International Short Story Award	—	Longlisted
2009	The Thing Around Your Neck	John Llewellyn Rhys Prize	—	Shortlisted
2010	The Thing Around Your Neck	Commonwealth Writers' Prize	Best Book (Africa)	Shortlisted
2010	The Thing Around Your Neck	Dayton Literary Peace Prize	Fiction	Runner-up
2015	Half of a Yellow Sun	Women's Prize for Fiction Best of the Best	—	Won
2013	Americanah	Chicago Tribune Heartland Prize	—	Won
2013	Americanah	National Book Critics Circle Award	Fiction	Won
2013	Americanah	New York Times Book Review	Ten Best Books of 2013	Won
2013	Americanah	BBC	Top Ten Books of 2013	Won
2014	Americanah	Andrew Carnegie Medals for Excellence	Fiction	Finalist
2014	Americanah	Baileys Women's Prize for Fiction	—	Shortlisted
2014	Americanah	Maine Readers' Choice Award	—	Longlisted
2015	Americanah	International Dublin Literary Award	—	Shortlisted
2017	Dear Ijeawele	Grand Prix de l'héroïne Madame Figaro	—	Won
2021	Notes on Grief	Goodreads Choice Awards	Memoir & Autobiography	Nominated
2023	Notes on Grief	Indie Book Awards (UK)	Non-Fiction	Won
2025	Dream Count	Women's Prize for Fiction	—	Longlisted

== Career awards ==
Career awards
Year	Award	Category	Result
2008	Future Awards Africa	Young Person of the Year	Won
2008	MacArthur Fellows Program	Genius Grant	Won
2015	This Day Awards	New Champions for an Enduring Culture	Nominated
2014	Forbes Africa Award	Person of the Year	Nominated
2014	MTV Africa Music Awards	Personality of the Year	Nominated
2015	Forbes Africa Award	Person of the Year	Nominated
2015	Girls Write Now Awards	Groundbreaker Honoree	Won
2016	Silverbird Special Achievement Award	—	Won
2017	Bard College's Mary McCarthy Award	—	Won
2017	Harper's Bazaar	Women of the Year	Won
2017	New African Woman Awards	Woman of the Year	Nominated
2018	Action Against Hunger Humanitarian Award	—	Won
2018	Barnes & Noble Writers for Writers Award	—	Won
2018	Global Hope Coalition's Thought Leadership Award	—	Won
2018	PEN Pinter Prize	—	Won
2018	Women Center's 32nd Annual Leadership Conference's Leadership Award	—	Won
2019	Bookcity Milano Prize	—	Won
2019	Everett Rogers Award	—	Won
2019	United Nations Foundation Global Leadership Award	—	Won
2020	Belle van Zuylenring	—	Won
2020	Friedrich Naumann Foundation's Africa Freedom Prize	—	Won
2020	Hurston/Wright Foundation's North Star Award	—	Won
2020	This Day Awards	Woman of the Decade	Won
2022	Business Insider Africa Awards	Creative Leader of the Year	Won
2022	Order of the Federal Republic	—	rejected
2024	Harper's Bazaar Espana's Woman of the Year Award in Literature	—	Won

== Honorary degrees ==
- Eastern Connecticut State University, 12 May 2015
- Johns Hopkins University, 18 May 2016
- Haverford College, Pennsylvania, 13 May 2017
- University of Edinburgh, 28 August 2017
- Duke University, 13 May 2018
- Amherst College, 20 May 2018
- Bowdoin College, 26 May 2018
- SOAS University of London, 27 July 2018
- American University, 11 May 2019
- Georgetown University, May 2019
- Rhode Island School of Design, 1 June 2019
- Yale University, 10 June 2019
- Northwestern University, 21 June 2019
- University of Pennsylvania, 18 May 2020
- UCLouvain, 28 April 2022
- University of Johannesburg, 14 October 2022
- Harvard University, 6 October 2022

== Other accolades ==
- New Yorker's 20 Under 40, 2010
- New African's 100 Most Influential Africans, 2013
- CNN Leading Women of 2014
- Time 100 Most Influential People, 2015
- Arise Magazine 100 Dynamic Women, 2015
- Vanity Fair's International Best Dressed List, 2016
- Fortune's List of 50 World Leaders, 2017
- Africa Report's 100 Most Influential Africans, 2019
- Sunday Times's Women of the Year, 2020
- BBC 100 Most Inspiring Women, 2021
- Forbes Africa's 100 Icons from Africa, 2021
- 100 Nigeria Women Annual: 100 Leading Women, 2022
- Women in Successful Careers (WISCAR) Award, 2022
- Enstooled as Odelu Uwa of Abba, a Nigerian chief, 2022 (Note: "Odeluwa" is an Igbo word which literally translates to "the one who writes for the world". She was the first woman in her town to receive a chieftaincy title.)
