= The Thing Around Your Neck =

2009 short-story collection by Chimamanda Ngozi Adichie

- First UK edition
- Author: Chimamanda Ngozi Adichie
- Language: English
- Genre: Fiction; bildungsroman
- Publisher: Fourth Estate (UK); Alfred A. Knopf (US)
- Publication date: 26 June 2009
- ISBN: 9781407440262
- OCLC: 1352646898
- Preceded by: Half of a Yellow Sun
- Followed by: Americanah

The Thing Around Your Neck is a 2009 short story collection by Chimamanda Ngozi Adichie. The twelve stories were initially published in magazines before being collected and published by Alfred A. Knopf in the United States, Fourth Estate in the United Kingdom, and in Nigeria by both Kachifo Limited and Narrative Landscape Press. Adichie's first short story collection and third book after Purple Hibiscus and Half of a Yellow Sun, it explores the themes of immigration, losses and gains, as well as Nigerian and American experiences.

Adichie was completing her MacArthur fellowship and Hodder fellowship from Princeton University when she started collecting the short stories. The book received positive reviews. The Thing Around Your Neck was nominated for several awards, among them, runner up of the Dayton Literary Peace Prize in 2010.

== Background and release ==
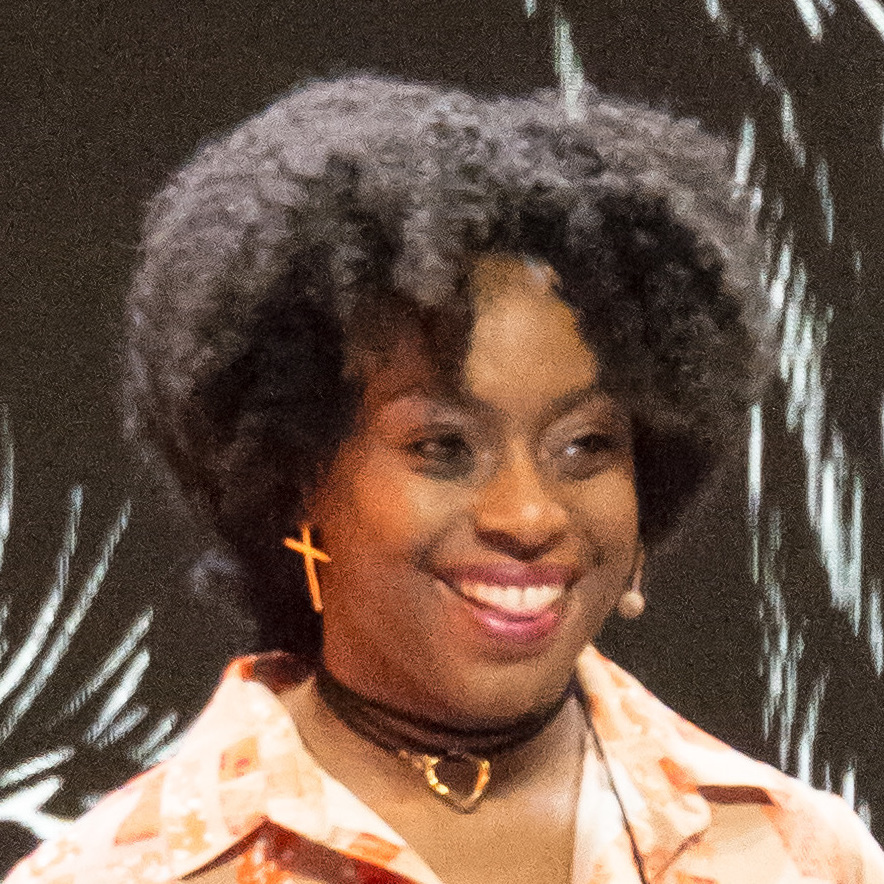
Adichie in 2020

The Thing Around Your Neck compiles twelve short stories written by Adichie while she was completing her MacArthur fellowship and Hodder fellowship from Princeton University; some of them were already published in several magazines. In an interview with NPR, Adichie said that she wanted the collection to "peel apart the layers of losses and gains that immigrants face", the themes that are partly inspired by her shock after her move to the United States in 1997. She observed that most Americans failed to appreciate Africa's diversity, and displayed a "mix of ignorance and arrogance" towards the inhabitants. The stories in the collection were based on the experiences of Adichie's family and acquaintances; for instance, "A Private Experience" was based on her aunt's story.

The book was first published in 2009 by Alfred Knopf when Adichie was 31 years old. The first edition was blurbed by Joyce Carol Oates, Edmund White and Chinua Achebe. It was also published in Nigeria in 2009 and 2017 by Kachifo Limited and Narrative Landscape Press, respectively. The Thing Around Your Neck is Adichie's third book after Purple Hibiscus (2003) and Half of a Yellow Sun (2006). Farafina Books, an imprint of Kachifo Limited, promoted the book in Nigeria, and Adichie had a public presentation of the book on 11 July 2009 at the Silverbird Lifestyle Store in Victoria Island, Lagos.

== Plot summaries ==
In "Cell One", Nnamabia, beginning stealing as a teenager, steals his mother's jewelry. With everyone knowing he is the culprit, his mother punishes him. A group of boys attacks a professor, and Nnamabia gets arrested as one of those boys and lands in a prison cell. Initially, he enjoys his stay until an old man is thrown into their cell. The old man gets abused by other boys, and while Nnamabia tries to defend him, he gets abused, too. He gets released immediately and returns to his family.

In "Imitation", an emigrant Nigerian woman, Nkem, resides in Philadelphia, US, with her husband, Obiora, an art dealer who doesn't spend much time at home; he comes home only two months in a year. They have a house in Nigeria. Nkem finds comfort in her maid and begins thinking her husband is cheating.

In "A Private Experience", during a riot caused by religious violence, Christian Chika and her female Hausa Muslim friend hide in a store together despite belonging to different faiths.

In "Ghosts", the narrator, a retired University mathematics professor, describes his encounter with someone he deems unalive.

In "On Monday of Last Week", Kamara joins her husband in the US to take a job as a nanny to an upper-class family. She becomes obsessed with the mother of the baby she is taking care of.

Set outside of Cape Town, South Africa, "Jumping Monkey Hill" centers on an African Writer's Workshop hosted by the British Council and a white man, Edward. The Nigerian protagonist, Ujunwa, attends the workshop alongside writers from throughout Africa. Ujunwa and the other writers face Edward's scrutiny and struggle to meet his requirements for "authentic" African narratives, rebuffing stories about homosexuality and workplace discrimination in favor of stories of war-torn African villages.

In "The Thing Around Your Neck", Akunna gets an American visa from her uncle to come to Maine, US, where he resides. When she arrives in the country, she is molested by her uncle. She leaves Maine and eventually gets employed as a waitress in Connecticut and meets a man with whom she falls in love, but experiences cultural difficulties with him.

In "The American Embassy", a woman applies for an asylum but ends up walking away, unwilling to expose her son's murder for the sake of a visa.

In "The Shivering", a Catholic Nigerian woman studying at Princeton University, whose boyfriend has left her, finds solace in the earnest prayers of a stranger who knocks at her door.

In "The Arrangers of Marriage", a newly married woman arrives in New York City with her husband but is unwilling to accept her husband's rejection of his Nigerian identity.

In "Tomorrow Is Too Far", a young woman reveals the devastating secret of her brother's death.

In "The Headstrong Historian", Nwamgba, believing that her husband was killed by his cousins, is determined to retain her husband's inheritance for her son. Nwamgba's son gets his inheritance after his grandmother, Nwamgba's mother, inherits it.

== Style and themes ==
Adichie conveys her stories using the first-person narrative. British writer Bernardine Evaristo pointed out Adichie's use of unpredictable and suspenseful endings which asks the readers to figure out the outcome of the story.

Moffat Sebola wrote that Adichie argues against the desecration of African names by assigning Igbo names to her characters, additionally pointing out the meaning and beauty of the Igbo language. She uses characters such as Amaka and Nwamgba to urge black women to protest the notion of baptismal names, especially when these are suggested as being superior replacements of African names.

According to Sebola, black women characters play great role in Adichie's work, given power to resist patriarchy. For example, the women in the collection were key figures in the Biafra war, as well as other religious and ethnic wars. To oppose the patriarchal systems, she uses her prose to advocate gender equality with her characters often drawn from experiences of black women in Africa and the United States. Moreover, she defies stereotypes on women's appearance including complexion, labelling these stereotypes racist. In "Cell One", Nnamabia, an admired handsome "honey-fair" boy, has his mother criticised by traders for giving a fair skin to her son and dark skin to her female child. The situation displays a stereotype that a fair skin is typically recognised as the mark of beauty only acceptable on women and not men. On hairstyle, she use Akunna to illustrate how the perception of a black woman's hair, attracting amazement for standing upright.

Chukwuma Ajakah of Vanguard wrote that the collection explores the themes of socio-cultural and economic issues affecting Africans both in Nigeria and the United States. He also wrote that family is a recurring theme, as was also noted by Jane Shilling of The Daily Telegraph.

== Reception ==
=== Critical review ===
The Thing Around Your Neck received widespread critical acclaim. (Note: Attributed to multiple references:) The Christian Science Monitor and Elle praised the stories in the collection. Kirkus Reviews commended the stories set specifically in the United States, singling out "Jumping Monkey Hill" and the title story as highlights. In praising the author, Robert L. Pincus of the San Diego Union-Tribune considered that the collection demonstrates why Adichie has attracted significant attention in her relatively short career. Bernardine Evaristo added that the collection confirmed Adichie's status as a major contemporary voice, describing it as evidence of her position among Africa's brightest literary talents.

While overall positive in his review, Shilling provided criticisms by challenging the occasional structural weaknesses, suggesting that a few stories end too abruptly, and opining that the final narrative, "The Headstrong Historian", might have benefited from greater expansion. Nevertheless, such concerns were generally regarded as minor in comparison to the collection's overall strengths.

=== Awards and nominations ===
In 2009, The Thing Around Your Neck was long-listed for the Frank O'Connor International Short Story Award and shortlisted for John Llewellyn Rhys Prize. In 2010, it was shortlisted as the Best Book (Africa) in the Commonwealth Writers' Prize and finished as a runner up of the Dayton Literary Peace Prize.
