= OluTimehin Kukoyi =

Nigerian writer, editor and activist (born 1991)

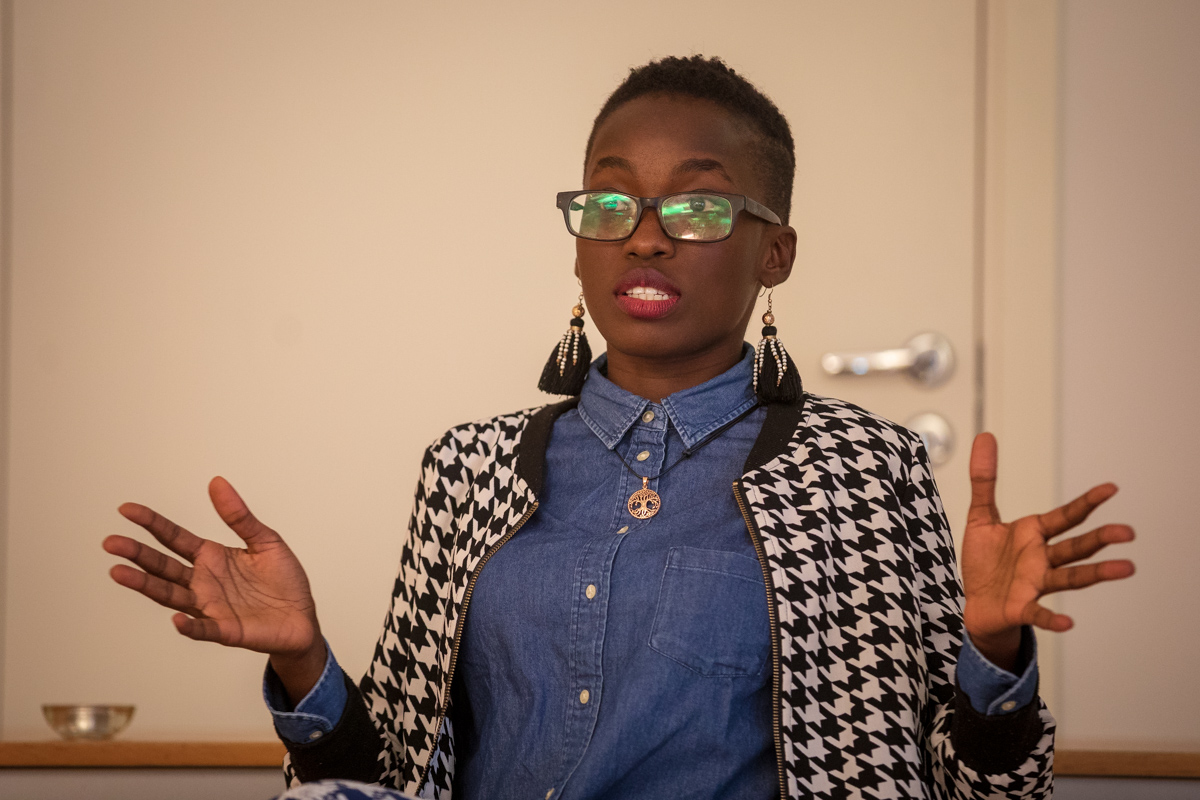
- OluTimehin Kukoyi in Oslo in 2018
- Born: Nigeria
- Citizenship: Nigerian
- Occupations: Writer, Feminist, Activist
- Writing career
- Language: English
- Genres: Essays, Non-fiction
- Notable works: Essays on gender, feminism, and social issues

OluTimehin Kukoyi (née Adegbeye) (born 3 October 1991) is a Nigerian writer, essayist and public intellectual. Her work concentrates on questions of gender, sexuality, urbanism and feminism. She also writes fiction.

== Career ==
Kukoyi regularly writes about politics, gender and other social issues on This Is Africa, Africa Is A Country, Bella Naija, and other publications. Her writing has been published in different languages, notably English, Japanese and Norwegian. She is a stringer for the Norwegian magazine Bistandsaktuelt and has also been published by Klassekampen. Her work in Norwegian has been used as background for textbooks for Norwegian junior colleges.

Kukoyi was a speaker at TEDGlobal in 2017, where she gave her talk 'Who Belongs in a City?". The talk was eventually selected by TED lead curator Chris Anderson as one of the ten most notable talks of the year. In 2015, she participated in the Farafina Trust's Creative Writing Workshop in Lagos. She is an alumna of the FEMRITE workshop in Uganda (2014) and the BRITDOC Queer Impact Producers Lab (2017).

OluTimehin Kukoyi is a prominent figure among Nigerian and African feminists of her generation. Through her website, blog, Twitter, journalism, public speaking and online activism, she has gained a wide readership among feminists and activists. She is known for the way she combines her experiences as a queer person and mother in Nigerian society with gender theory and social struggles. Besides the TED stage, she has also spoken at global conferences like the AWID forum, the inaugural Urban 20 Summit, the Oslo Urban Arena, the Women Deliver Conference and the Up Close and Liveable festival, as well as at various universities.

She was awarded the 2019 Gerald Kraak Prize for her nonfiction piece "Mothers and Men".

She was a staff writer at The Correspondent, working as the 'Othering Correspondent' until the digital publication shut down in January 2021.

OluTimehin is the co-founder of Square, a creative consultancy based in Lagos, Nigeria.
