= Of Women and Frogs =

2018 novel by Bisi Adjapon

- First edition cover
- Author: Bisi Adjapon
- Language: English
- Genre: Fiction
- Publisher: Farafina Books, HarperCollins
- Publication date: 29 September 2019
- Publication place: Ghana and Nigeria
- Pages: 416 (first edition)
- ISBN: 9789785572193

Of Women and Frogs is a 2018 novel by Nigerian-Ghanaian writer Bisi Adjapon. Of Women and Frogs was first published by Farafina Books in Nigeria, and in February 2020, HarperCollins acquired the world English-language publishing rights in the book, re-titled The Teller of Secrets for the US market.

== Plot ==
Of Women and Frogs is a novel about Esi, a Nigerian-Ghanaian teenager, which tells about some of the challenges girls in Ghana and Africa at large. As described by The Lagos Review, "The themes Adjapon examines in this amazing work include deceit, heartbreak, domestic violence, deaths, failure of leadership, military dictatorship and abuse of power."

== Awards and recognition ==
- The Top 10 Nigerian Books of 2019 by Channels Television
- "Five must-read books by Ghanaian writers" on Mail & Guardian, 3 July 2020
- Short story version was longlisted for The Caine Prize for African Writing in 2019
