= Eghosa Imasuen =

Nigerian writer

Eghosa Imasuen (born May 19, 1976) is a Nigerian writer and medical doctor. He is the author of To Saint Patrick and Fine Boys, published by Farafina Magazine. He is the founder of the Narrative Landscape Press.
