= The Tiny Things Are Heavier =

2025 novel by Esther Okonkwo

- Author: Esther Ifesinachi Okonkwo
- Genre: Fiction
- Publisher: Bloomsbury Publishing
- Publication date: June 24, 2025
- Pages: 288
- ISBN: 978-1-639-73411-5

The Tiny Things Are Heavier is the debut novel by Nigerian author Esther Ifesinachi Okonkwo. Published by Bloomsbury Publishing on June 24, 2025, the literary fiction novel explores themes of migration, mental health, familial obligation, love, and identity, primarily focusing on a Nigerian immigrant navigating life in America and the complicated pull of home. The novel has been compared to works by Chimamanda Ngozi Adichie.

== Plot summary ==
The novel follows Somkelechukwu (Sommy), a Nigerian woman who travels to the United States to pursue graduate studies in literature in Iowa. Her departure occurs just two weeks after her elder brother, Mezie, attempts suicide, leaving Sommy plagued by guilt and struggling with homesickness and a sense of alienation in her new life.

Sommy initially enters a relationship with her boisterous Nigerian roommate, Bayo. However, her life becomes more complicated when she begins to fall for Bryan, a biracial American writer whose Nigerian father abandoned his family shortly after his birth. Bound by their feelings of unbelonging and a shared, vague sense of Nigerian kinship, Sommy and Bryan grow close.

During a summer break, Sommy and Bryan travel to Lagos, Nigeria. Sommy hopes to reconcile with Mezie and confront the complexities of her family relationships, while Bryan seeks to connect with his estranged father. A shocking and unexpected event occurs during this trip, which throws their lives into disarray, strains Sommy's relationships, and forces her to confront her own identity and what she truly owes to her loved ones. The narrative explores the contrast between the American Midwest and the bustling city of Lagos, using migration as a lens to examine universal human struggles and the process of moving from young adulthood to maturity.
