= Narrative Landscape Press =

Nigerian publishing company

- Website type: Publishing
- Founded: June 2017; 9 years ago
- Headquarters: Lagos, Nigeria
- Founders: Eghosa Imasuen, Anwuli Ojogwu
- Website: http://www.narrativelandscape.com/

Narrative Landscape Press (founded June 2017) is an independent publishing services and publishing-logistics firm in Lagos, Nigeria, which serves self-publishing authors, small independent presses. It also manages the Olusegun Obasanjo Presidential Library publishing imprint.

== Founding and management ==
Founded in early 2017 by writers Eghosa Imasuen (author of To Saint Patrick and Fine Boys) and Anwuli Ojogwu, the outfit has been described as "a fruit of the wide ranging experiences of its two founders" with years of experience in writing and publishing.

The enterprise was set up to "facilitate the process of print production, shipping and delivery of books" and to "assist publishers, self-published authors, media owners, academics, and organisations to turn their books or other media projects into reality by taking on the hassles of printing and logistics on target and on budget." It is not a traditional publishing company yet but hopes to go into traditional publishing in January 2018.

Co-founder Eghosa Imasuen, a trained medical doctor, was formerly an editor at Kachifo Limited, publishers of Farafina Magazine, where he worked on the presidential memoirs of President Olusegun Obasanjo. Anwuli also had a stint at Farafina and other publishing outfits.

== Titles ==
Since its founding, the Press has released the following titles:

- Love Does Not Win Elections by Ayisha Osori
- Are You Not a Nigerian by Bayo Olupohunda
- Folktales are Forever by Efe Farinre
- The Pressure Cooker: Lessons from a Woman at Work by Nkiru Olumide-Ojo
