= The Danger of a Single Story =

2009 TED Talk delivered by Chimamanda Ngozi Adichie

The Danger of a Single Story is a TED Talk delivered by Chimamanda Ngozi Adichie in 2009. In the talk, she expressed her concern that accepting one version of a story perpetrates myths and stereotypes because it fails to recognise the complexities of human life and situations. She argued that under-representation of the layers that make up a person's identity or culture deprives them of their humanity.

== Sources ==
- Anasuya, Shreya Ila (20 June 2015). "Chimamanda Ngozi Adichie Speaks as Well as She Writes, Maybe Better". Scroll.in. Cambridge, Massachusetts. Archived from the original on 5 June 2023.
- Brooks, David (19 April 2016). "The Danger of a Single Story". The New York Times. Archived from the original on 15 May 2024.
- Wagner, Erica (3 November 2015). "Chimamanda Ngozi Adichie: 'I Wanted To Claim My Own Name'". British Vogue. London, UK. Archived from the original on 18 October 2023.
