= Love Does Not Win Elections =

2017 novel by Ayisha Osori

- First edition
- Author: Ayisha Osori
- Language: English
- Subject: Politics; Gender bias in Nigeria
- Genre: Political literature; Non-fiction
- Set in: Nigeria
- Publisher: Narrative Landscape Press
- Publication date: 2017
- Publication place: Nigeria
- Media type: Print (hardcover)

Love Does Not Win Elections is a political book by Nigerian author and lawyer Ayisha Osori. It was published in 2017 by Narrative Landscape Press.

== Development ==
In 2014 Osori contested the primaries for a seat in the National Assembly under the People's Democratic Party but lost. After she was defeated, she wrote the book as a documentary of her experience.

== Plot summary ==
Osori wrote mostly about the gender biased system in the Nigerian electoral system. The book provides insight into the role that money plays in Nigerian elections.

== Reception ==
It was listed as a must read on Nigerian politics by Daily Trust. Laura Seay writing for The Washington Post said "It's a sharp, witty and often infuriating narrative of how patronage politics, sexism and ethnicity can confound candidates."
