= James Nwoye Adichie =

Nigerian academic

- Born: 1 March 1932; Abba, Njikoka, Anambra State
- Died: 10 June 2020 (aged 88)
- Occupation: Professor of statistics at the University of Nigeria Nsukka
- Children: Chimamanda Ngozi Adichie

Chief James Nwoye Adichie (1 March 1932 – 10 June 2020) was a Nigerian academic who served as a first professor of statistics at the University of Nigeria Nsukka. He was the father of writer Chimamanda Ngozi Adichie.

== Life ==
Adichie was born on 1 March 1932 in Abba, located in Njikoka, Anambra State. Soon after his birth, he relocated to Awkuzu and later to Nimo, where he attended Nimo Primary School for his early education.

In 1957, he enrolled in the University College, Ibadan, to study mathematics, graduating in 1960. He then joined the research department at the Central Bank of Nigeria (CBN). After leaving the CBN, Adichie returned to academia as a mathematics instructor at the Nigerian College of Arts, Science and Technology in Enugu State and later became an assistant lecturer at the University of Nigeria, Nsukka. In September 1963, he departed Nigeria to pursue a PhD in statistics at the University of California, Berkeley, where he studied under Erich Leo Lehmann. He earned his doctorate in 1966, becoming the first Nigerian to receive a PhD in statistics from UC Berkeley. In 1976, he became the inaugural professor of statistics at the University of Nigeria and later served as its Deputy Vice Chancellor from 1980 to 1984, retiring in 1997.

Throughout his career, Adichie published articles in academic journals and magazines. His academic work included a fellowship at the University of Sheffield in England and a term as a visiting professor at San Diego State University in California, as well as serving as the first editor of the Journal of Statistical Association of Nigeria. On 2 May 2015, while returning to Abba from Nsukka, Adichie was kidnapped. According to reports from Pulse Nigeria, his daughter, Chimamanda Ngozi Adichie, explained in The New York Times that her presence was a factor in the abduction. He was released three days later after payment of a ransom.

== Legacy ==
Adichie was the "Odelora Abba", a Nigerian chieftaincy title. A member of the Nigerian National Advisory Council on Statistics, he was one of the figures who reorganised the Federal Office of Statistics that was later reformed to the National Bureau of Statistics.
