= Dream Count =

2025 novel by Chimamanda Ngozi Adichie

- Author: Chimamanda Ngozi Adichie
- Publisher: Alfred A. Knopf
- Publication date: 7 March 2025
- Pages: 416
- ISBN: 978-0-593-80272-4

Dream Count is a novel written by Nigerian writer Chimamanda Ngozi Adichie, published in 2025.

== Plot summary ==
The novel features four women whose stories are told in turn: Chiamaka, a Nigerian travel writer stranded in America during the pandemic, her friend Zikora who is a successful lawyer, her cousin Omelogor who works in finance before coming to study in the US, and Chiamaka's housekeeper, Kadiatou.

== Reception ==
In a review for the Associated Press, Helen Wieffering acknowledged Dream Count's "vibrant energy" and said it "succeeds because every page is suffused with empathy, and because Adichie’s voice is as forthright and clarifying as ever".
