= Farafina Magazine =

Defunct bio-monthly Nigerian magazine

Farafina
- Cover for the October 2006 issue
- Frequency: bi-monthly (2004–2009)
- Company: Kachifo Limited
- Country: Nigeria
- Based in: Lagos
- Language: English

Farafina Magazine was a bi-monthly Nigerian magazine published online from 2002, and in print from October 2005, until 2009 by Kachifo Limited. It was a general-interest African magazine that included non-fiction articles alongside fiction pieces and illustrations.

Guest editors for the magazine included several notable authors such as Chimamanda Ngozi Adichie, Laila Lalami, and Petina Gappah. It published work by writers such as Wole Soyinka, Segun Afolabi, and Jide Alakija.

The magazine was considered important in postcolonial literature for helping lay "the foundations of a pan-African literary network" alongside the Nairobi-based literary magazine Kwani?.
