= Dear Ijeawele, or A Feminist Manifesto in Fifteen Suggestions =

2017 book by Chimamanda Ngozi Adichie

- First edition
- Author: Chimamanda Ngozi Adichie
- Audio read by: January LaVoy
- Language: English
- Genre: Epistolary, feminism
- Published: 2017
- Publisher: Knopf Publishers
- Publication place: Nigeria
- Media type: Print, e-book, audiobook
- Pages: 80 pages (hardback)
- ISBN: 152473313X US hardback
- OCLC: 975594894

Dear Ijeawele, or A Feminist Manifesto in Fifteen Suggestions is an epistolary form manifesto written by Nigerian author Chimamanda Ngozi Adichie. Dear Ijeawele was posted on her official Facebook page on October 12, 2016, was subsequently adapted into a book, and published in print on March 7, 2017.

Before becoming a book, Dear Ijeawele was a personal e-mail written by Adichie in response to her friend, "Ijeawele", who had asked Adichie's advice on how to raise her daughter as a feminist. The result of this e-mail correspondence is the extended 62-page Dear Ijeawele manifesto, written in the form of a letter. While the manifesto was written to a female friend, the work's audience scope has been recognized to extend beyond only the mothers of daughters.

Dear Ijeawele is composed of fifteen suggestions on how to raise a feminist daughter, with references to Adichie and Ijeawele's shared Nigerian heritage and Igbo culture. Adichie was inspired to publicize the letter after becoming increasingly aware of what she recognized as ongoing gender inequality in her native Nigeria. Dear Ijeawele featured on NPR's list of "2017's Great Reads".

== Synopsis ==
Dear Ijeawele attempts to challenge the prejudices of gender roles and expectations. with the epistolary form used as a literary device to give the reader a personal and intimate connection with the manifesto. In language that is clear, direct, and simple, the manifesto aims to provide parents with the tools to combat situations of gender inequality when raising daughters. The issues covered range from domestic duties, such as cooking, to gendered baby clothes. The manifesto asserts that central to raising feminist daughters is the embracing of feminist ideals by mothers raising daughters. One piece of advice that Adichie gives is: "Ask for help. Expect to be helped...Domestic work and care-giving should be gender-neutral."

Adichie rejects the idea of Dear Ijeawele being intended as "a parenting book". Her manifesto references notable figure Hillary Clinton's title of "wife" on her Twitter account to exemplify claims of gender inequality. The overarching goal of the manifesto is gender equality.

=== The suggestions ===
Dear Ijeawele is prefaced by Adichie's "two 'Feminist Tools'", of which the first is:

your premise, the solid unbending belief that you start off with. What is your premise? Your feminist premise should be: I matter. I matter equally. Not 'if only.' Not 'as long as.' I matter equally. Full stop.

The fifteen suggestions of Dear Ijeawele begin, respectively, with the following prompts:

1. Be a full person.
2. Do it together.
3. Teach her that 'gender roles' is absolute nonsense.
4. Beware the danger of what I call Feminism Lite.
5. Teach Chizalum to read.
6. Teach her to question language.
7. Never speak of marriage as an achievement.
8. Teach her to reject likeability.
9. Give Chizalum a sense of identity.
10. Be deliberate about how you engage with her and her appearance.
11. Teach her to question our culture's selective use of biology as 'reasons' for social norms.
12. Talk to her about sex and start early.
13. Romance will happen so be on board.
14. In teaching her about oppression, be careful not to turn the oppressed into saints.
15. Teach her about difference.

== Reception ==
In a Guardian review of the work in its book format, Tessa Hadley said that "It would be difficult not to like this little book, which shines with all Chimamanda Ngozi Adichie's characteristic warmth and sanity and forthrightness" and that "Some of the suggestions feel like mountains of difficulty made simple: but then that's what manifestos are for." The Harvard Crimson wrote favorably about the book, stating that it "sets a standard for feminism".
