= Americanah =

2013 novel by Chimamanda Ngozi Adichie

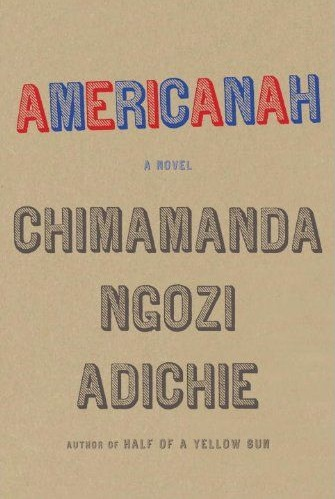
- Book cover, 2013
- Author: Chimamanda Ngozi Adichie
- Language: English
- Genre: Fiction
- Publisher: Alfred A. Knopf
- Publication date: 14 May 2013
- Publication place: Nigeria
- ISBN: 978-0-307-96212-6

Americanah is a 2013 novel by the Nigerian author Chimamanda Ngozi Adichie. It is Adichie's third novel and fourth book, and was published on 14 May 2013 by Alfred A. Knopf. The novel recounts the story of a young Nigerian woman, Ifemelu, who emigrates to the United States to attend university. Americanah won the National Book Critics Circle Award for Fiction in 2013 and was a commercial success upon publication.

== Plot summary ==
As teenagers in a Lagos secondary school, Ifemelu and Obinze fall in love. Nigeria at the time is under military dictatorship, and people are seeking to leave the country. Ifemelu departs for the United States to study. Through her experiences in relationships and studies, she chronicles her experience of race in American culture. Upon coming to America, Ifemelu discovered for the first time what it means to be a "Black Person". Obinze, son of a professor, had hoped to join her in the US but he is denied a visa after 9/11. He goes to London and, committing a crime, refuses to leave before his visa expires.

Years later, Obinze returns to Nigeria and becomes a wealthy man as a property developer in the newly democratic country. Ifemelu gains success in the United States, where she becomes known for her blog about race in America, entitled "Raceteenth or Various Observations About American Blacks (Those Formerly Known as Negroes) by a Non-American Black". When Ifemelu returns to Nigeria, the two consider the viability of reviving a relationship in light of their diverging experiences during their many years apart.

== Background ==
In her 2009 TED talk entitled "The Danger of a Single Story", the Nigerian author Chimamanda Ngozi Adichie argued for the understanding of the multiplicity of African experiences. After the publication of her second novel, Half of a Yellow Sun, Vogue classified Adichie as the first in a series of young African authors who write about their countries with Western audiences in mind. Adichie started writing fiction at Johns Hopkins University and later got a master's in African studies at Yale University.

Adichie said, when she was growing up: "everyone wanted to go to America. But I never wanted to until I realised it would be a way of escaping becoming a doctor". After a year of studying medicine, at 19 years old, Adichie dropped out and left Nigeria for the US to live with her sister in Brooklyn, and then moved to Philadelphia, where she studied. Adichie took four years to write the novel. The title "Americanah" is Lagosian slang for "Nigerians newly returned after a spell Stateside".

Americanah was translated into French by Anne Damour and published by Gallimard in 2015.

== Reception ==
=== Critical reviews ===
In her review for San Francisco Chronicle, Catherine Chung wrote: "Americanah is an exhilarating, mind-expanding pleasure of a read. It is a brilliant treatise on race, class and globalization, and also a deep, clear-eyed story about love—and how it can both demand and make possible the struggle to become our most authentic selves." Kristy Davis of Oprah Daily wrote that the novel is "an expansive, epic love story. It pulls no punches with regard to race, class and the high-risk, heart-tearing struggle for belonging in a fractured world", while NPR wrote that "Adichie weaves whole entries into the narrative, and these tart editorials add yet another dimension to Americanah, which is as capacious, absorbing and original a novel as you will read this year". Eugenia Williamson of The Boston Globe called the book "a cerebral and utterly transfixing epic, and said it "is superlative at making clear just how isolating it can be to live far away from home". Mike Peed wrote in The New York Times that the novel "holds the discomfiting realities of our times fearlessly before us ... [It is] A steady-handed dissection of the universal human experience".

In her review for The Washington Post, Emily Raboteau praised the author, writing: "Adichie is uniquely positioned to compare racial hierarchies in the United States to social striving in her native Nigeria. She does so in this new work with a ruthless honesty about the ugly and beautiful sides of both nations." The Dallas Morning News called Americanah "a bright, bold book with unforgettable swagger that proves it sometimes takes a newcomer to show Americans to ourselves". According to John Timpane of The Philadelphia Inquirer: "Americanah tackles the U.S. race complex with a directness and brio no U.S. writer of any color would risk", while Vogue and The Seattle Times called Americanah "that rare thing in contemporary literary fiction: a lush, big-hearted love story that also happens to be a piercingly funny social critique"; and "a near-flawless novel", respectively.

In a review for The Chicago Tribune, Laura Pearson called Americanah a "sprawling, ambitious and gorgeously written" novel that "covers race, identity, relationships, community, politics, privilege, language, hair, ethnocentrism, migration, intimacy, estrangement, blogging, books and Barack Obama. It covers three continents, spans decades, leaps gracefully, from chapter to chapter, to different cities and other lives."

=== Awards and nominations ===
Americanah won the 2013 National Book Critics Circle Award for Fiction. It was shortlisted for the Baileys Women's Prize for Fiction in 2014. It won the 2013 Heartland Award for Fiction by The Chicago Tribune.

In 2013, Americanah was rated as "one of the Best Books of the Year" by The New York Times, NPR, Chicago Tribune, The Washington Post, The Seattle Times, Entertainment Weekly, and Newsday. New York Times Book Review selected the novel as one of the 10 Best Books of 2013. In March 2017, Americanah won the "One Book, One New York" program by One City One Book. In 2024, it was ranked 27th in The New York Times' list of 100 best books of the 21st century.

== Legacy ==
By 2015, Americanah had sold more than 500,000 copies and had been translated into 25 languages. The novel remained on NPR's Paperback Best-Seller list for 78 weeks. The New York Times included it in its list of best books of 2013, and by 23 December 2013, it was at number 179 on Amazon's list of its 10,000 best-selling books.

=== Censorship ===
In 2022, Americanah was banned in the Clay County School District in Florida.

=== Adaptations ===
In 2014, it was announced David Oyelowo and Lupita Nyong'o would star in a film adaptation of Americanah that to be produced by Brad Pitt and his production company Plan B Entertainment. In 2018, Nyong'o told The Hollywood Reporter she was developing a television miniseries based on the book that she would produce and star in. It was announced on 13 September 2019 HBO Max would air the miniseries in ten episodes, with actor and playwright Danai Gurira as writer and showrunner. On October 15, 2020, it was reported the miniseries would not proceed due to scheduling conflicts.
