= Notes on Grief =

2021 memoir by Chimamanda Ngozi Adichie

- Author: Chimamanda Ngozi Adichie
- Language: English
- Genre: Non-fiction
- Publisher: Random House of Canada
- Publication date: 11 May 2021
- Publication place: Nigeria
- Media type: Print (Paperback)
- Pages: 80
- ISBN: 9781039001565

Notes on Grief is a 2021 memoir written by the Nigerian author Chimamanda Ngozi Adichie. Presented in 30 short sections, Notes on Grief was written following the death of her father James Nwoye Adichie in June 2020, during the early days of the COVID-19 pandemic, and is expanded from an essay first published in The New Yorker. As The New York Times notes: "What she narrates is not only father loss, but the ways Mr. Adichie endures in having made of her a writer."

== Reception ==
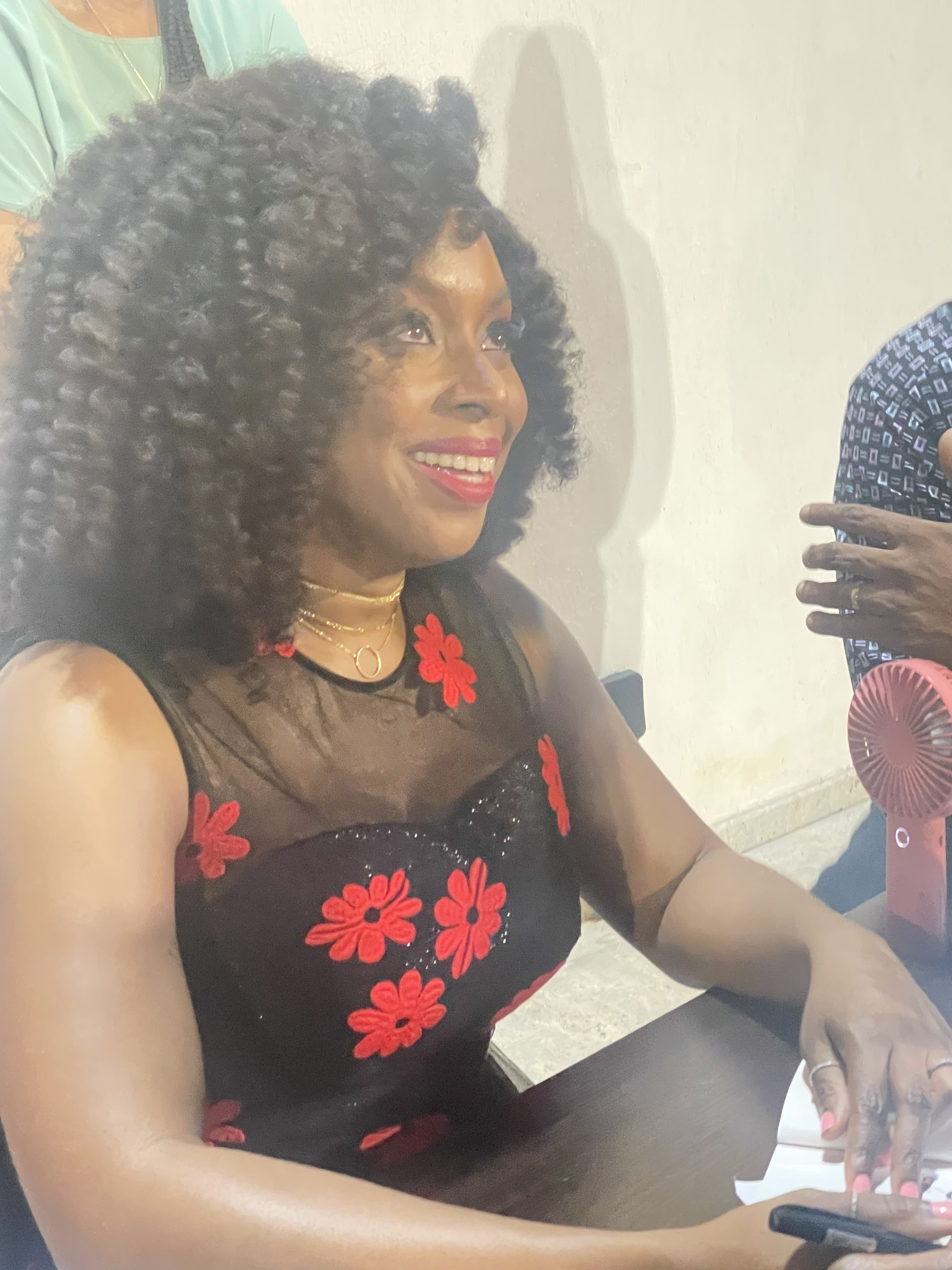
Adichie signing a copy of Notes on Grief

Reviewing Notes on Grief for NPR, Hope Wabuke said: "In poetic bursts of imagistic prose that mirror the fracturing of self after the death of a beloved parent, Adichie constructs a narrative of mourning — of haunting and of love." The Guardian review characterised it as "both emotional and austere, a work of dignity and of unravelling. Spare and yet spiritually nutritious". Ainehi Edoro in Brittle Paper observes: "In the book, grief is represented in a strikingly sensory language. ...Ultimately, the book is a portrait of her father."

Notes on Grief received a starred review from Kirkus Reviews, which concluded with the description: "An elegant, moving contribution to the literature of death and dying."
