= Chimamanda Ngozi Adichie =

Nigerian writer (born 1977)

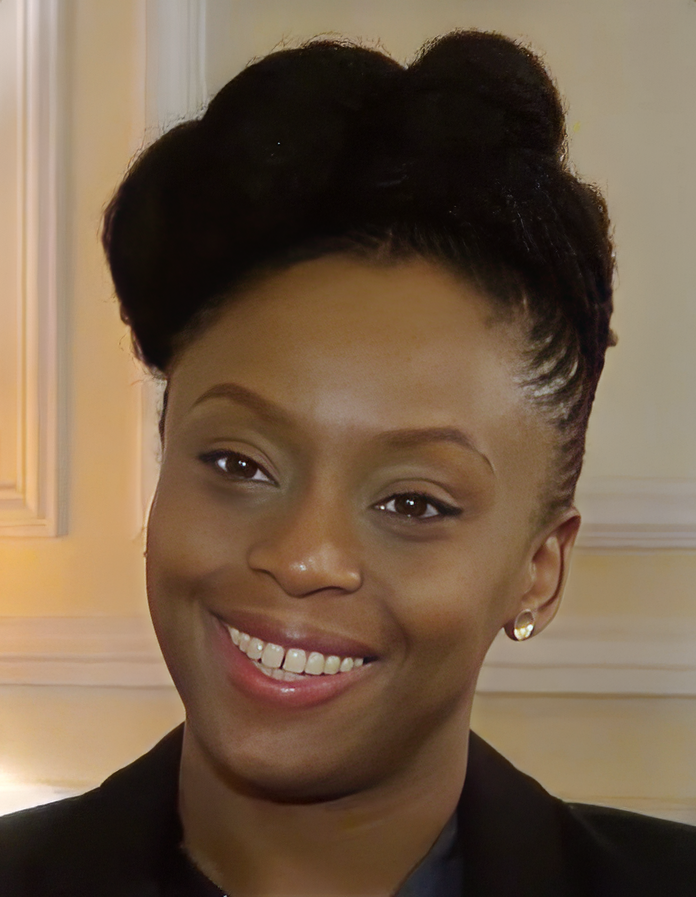
- Adichie in 2015
- Born: Grace Ngozi Adichie; 15 September 1977 (age 49); Enugu, Enugu State, Nigeria
- Other name: Amanda N. Adichie
- Education: University of Nigeria; Drexel University; Eastern Connecticut State University (BA); Johns Hopkins University (MA); Yale University (MA)
- Occupation: Writer
- Spouse: Ivara Esege (m. 2009)
- Children: 3
- Writing career
- Years active: since 2003
- Genres: Novel, short story, memoir, children's book
- Notable awards: Full list
- Website: www.chimamanda.com

Chimamanda Ngozi Adichie ( (Note: /ˌtʃɪməˈmɑːndə əŋˈɡoʊzi əˈdiːtʃi.eɪ/ (Note: CHI-mə-MAHN-də əng-GOH-zee ə-DEE-chee-ay Adichie's name has been pronounced a variety of ways in English. This transcription attempts to best approximate the Igbo pronunciation for English-speaking readers.)) born 15 September 1977) is a Nigerian writer, whose works include fiction, nonfiction, and lectures. She is widely recognised as a central figure in postcolonial feminist literature.

Born into an Igbo family in Enugu, Nigeria, Adichie was educated at the University of Nigeria in Nsukka, where she studied medicine for a year and half. She left Nigeria at the age of 19 to study in the United States at Drexel University in Philadelphia, Pennsylvania, and went on to study at Eastern Connecticut State University, Johns Hopkins University, and Yale University in the U.S.

Many of Adichie's novels are set in Nsukka, where she grew up. She started writing during her university education. She first wrote Decisions (1997), a poetry collection, followed by a play, For Love of Biafra (1998). She achieved early success with her debut novel, Purple Hibiscus. Adichie has written many works and has cited Chinua Achebe and Buchi Emecheta as inspirations. Her writing style juxtaposes Western and African influences, with particular influence from Igbo culture. Most of her works explore the themes of religion, immigration, gender and culture.

Adichie is a public speaker who has spoken at many commencement ceremonies, including at Williams College (2017), Harvard University (2018), and the American University (2019). She has also delivered Ted Talks, among them, "The Danger of a Single Story" (2009) and "We Should All Be Feminists" (2012). Part of the latter was featured by American singer Beyoncé in her song, as well as being featured on a T-shirt by Dior in 2016. Adichie's awards and honours include academic and literary prizes, fellowships, grants, honorary degrees, and other high recognition, such as a MacArthur Fellowship in 2008 and induction into the American Academy of Arts and Sciences in 2017.

== Early life and initial stage career ==
Adichie was born, with the English name Grace, on 15 September 1977 as the fifth out of six children. She was raised in Enugu, Nigeria, by parents of Igbo origin. Her father James Nwoye Adichie was from Abba in Anambra State while her mother and namesake Grace Odigwe was born in Umunnachi. Her father, who studied mathematics at University College, Ibadan, until his graduation in 1957, married Grace on 15 April 1963, and moved with her to Berkeley, California, to complete his PhD degree at the University of California. While in the United States, Adichie's parents had two daughters: ljeoma Rosemary and Uchenna. Her father returned to Nigeria and began working as a professor at the University of Nigeria, Nsukka in 1966. Her mother began her university studies in 1964, at Merritt College in Oakland, California, and then later earned a degree in sociology and anthropology from the University of Nigeria.

The Biafran War broke out in 1967 and Adichie's father started working for the Biafran government at the Biafran Manpower Directorate. Adichie lost her maternal and paternal grandfathers during the war. After Biafra ceased to exist in 1970, her father returned to the University of Nigeria, while her mother worked for the government at Enugu until 1973, before becoming an administration officer at the University of Nigeria, and later the first female registrar. Adichie stayed at the campus of the University of Nigeria, in a house previously occupied by Nigerian writer Chinua Achebe. Her siblings include Ijeoma Rosemary, Uchenna "Uche", Chukwunweike "Chuks", Okechukwu "Okey", and Kenechukwu "Kene".

As a child, Adichie read only English-language stories, especially by children's writer Enid Blyton. Adichie's juvenilia included stories with characters who were white and blue-eyed, modeled on British children she had read about. At the age of 10, she discovered African literature and read Things Fall Apart by Chinua Achebe, The African Child by Camara Laye, Weep Not, Child by Ngũgĩ wa Thiong'o, and The Joys of Motherhood by Buchi Emecheta. Adichie began to study her father's stories about Biafra when she was 13 years old. On visits to Abba, she saw houses that were destroyed and rusty bullets scattered on the ground. She would later incorporate these memories and her father's accounts into her novels.

At her Catholic confirmation, Adichie changed her English name from Grace to Amanda, under which name her first work was published. In her formal education, Adichie was taught in both Igbo and English. Although Igbo was not a popular subject, she continued taking courses in the language throughout high school. She completed her secondary education at the University of Nigeria Campus Secondary School, with top distinction in the West African Examinations Council (WAEC), and academic prizes. She was admitted to the University of Nigeria, where she studied medicine and pharmacy for a year and half. She was also the editor of The Compass, a student-run university magazine. In 1997, at the age of 19, Adichie published Decisions, a collection of poems, and later moved to the United States, to study communications at Drexel University in Philadelphia, Pennsylvania. In 1998, she wrote a play called For Love of Biafra, which was her initial exploration of the theme of war. These early works were written under the name Amanda N. Adichie.

Two years after moving to the United States, she transferred to Eastern Connecticut State University in Willimantic, Connecticut, living with her sister Ijeoma, who was a medical doctor there. In 2000, Adichie published her short story "My Mother, the Crazy African", which discusses the problems that arise when a person is facing two cultures that are complete opposites from each other. After finishing her undergraduate degree, she continued studying and simultaneously pursuing a writing career. While a senior at Eastern Connecticut, she wrote articles for the university paper Campus Lantern. She received her bachelor's degree summa cum laude with a major in political science and a minor in communications in 2001. She earned a master's degree in creative writing from Johns Hopkins University in 2003, and for the next two years was a Hodder Fellow at Princeton University, where she taught introductory fiction. She began studying at Yale University, and completed a second master's degree in African studies in 2008. Adichie received a MacArthur Fellowship that same year, plus other academic prizes, including the 2011–2012 Fellowship of the Radcliffe Institute for Advanced Study at Harvard University.

== Career ==
=== 2003: Literary debut and publication struggle ===
While studying in the US, Adichie started researching and writing her first novel, Purple Hibiscus. She sent her manuscript to publishing houses and literary agents, who either rejected it or requested that she change the setting from Africa to America, so as to make it more familiar to a broader range of readers. Eventually, Djana Pearson Morris, a literary agent working at Pearson Morris and Belt Literary Management, accepted the manuscript. Although the agent recognized that marketing would be challenging, since Adichie was Black but neither African-American nor Caribbean, she submitted it to publishers until it was eventually accepted and published by Algonquin Books, a small independent company, in 2003. In 2004, Fourth Estate published the novel in the United Kingdom, while Kachifo Limited published it in Nigeria. During those time, Adichie hired literary agent Sarah Chalfant of the Wylie Agency to represent her. Purple Hibiscus has been translated into more than forty languages.

=== 2006–2012: publication of Half of a Yellow Sun and The Thing Around Your Neck; public speaking success ===
After her first novel, Adichie began writing her second one Half of a Yellow Sun, on which she worked for four years. Because the novel expands on the Biafran conflict during the Nigerian Civil War, Adichie employed her father's memories of the Biafran War, as well as reading books, including Buchi Emecheta's 1982 novel Destination Biafra. The novel was first published in 2006 by Anchor Books, a trade-paperback imprint of Alfred A. Knopf, who also released the book later under its Vintage Canada label. It was published in France as L'autre moitié du soleil in 2008, by Éditions Gallimard.

While completing her Hodder and MacArthur fellowships in 2008, Adichie started compiling short stories that she had already published in magazines. Twelve of the stories were collected in her third book and first short-story collection, The Thing Around Your Neck, which was published by Knopf in 2009. In the same year, she delivered a TED Talk titled "The Danger of a Single Story".

On 15 March 2012, Adichie became the youngest person to deliver a Commonwealth Lecture. The presentation was given at the Guildhall in London, addressing the theme "Connecting Cultures". Also in 2012, she delivered a talk titled "We Should All Be Feminists" for TEDxEuston in London.

=== 2013–2019: Americanah and Dear Ijeawele, or A Feminist Manifesto in Fifteen Suggestions success and feminism ===
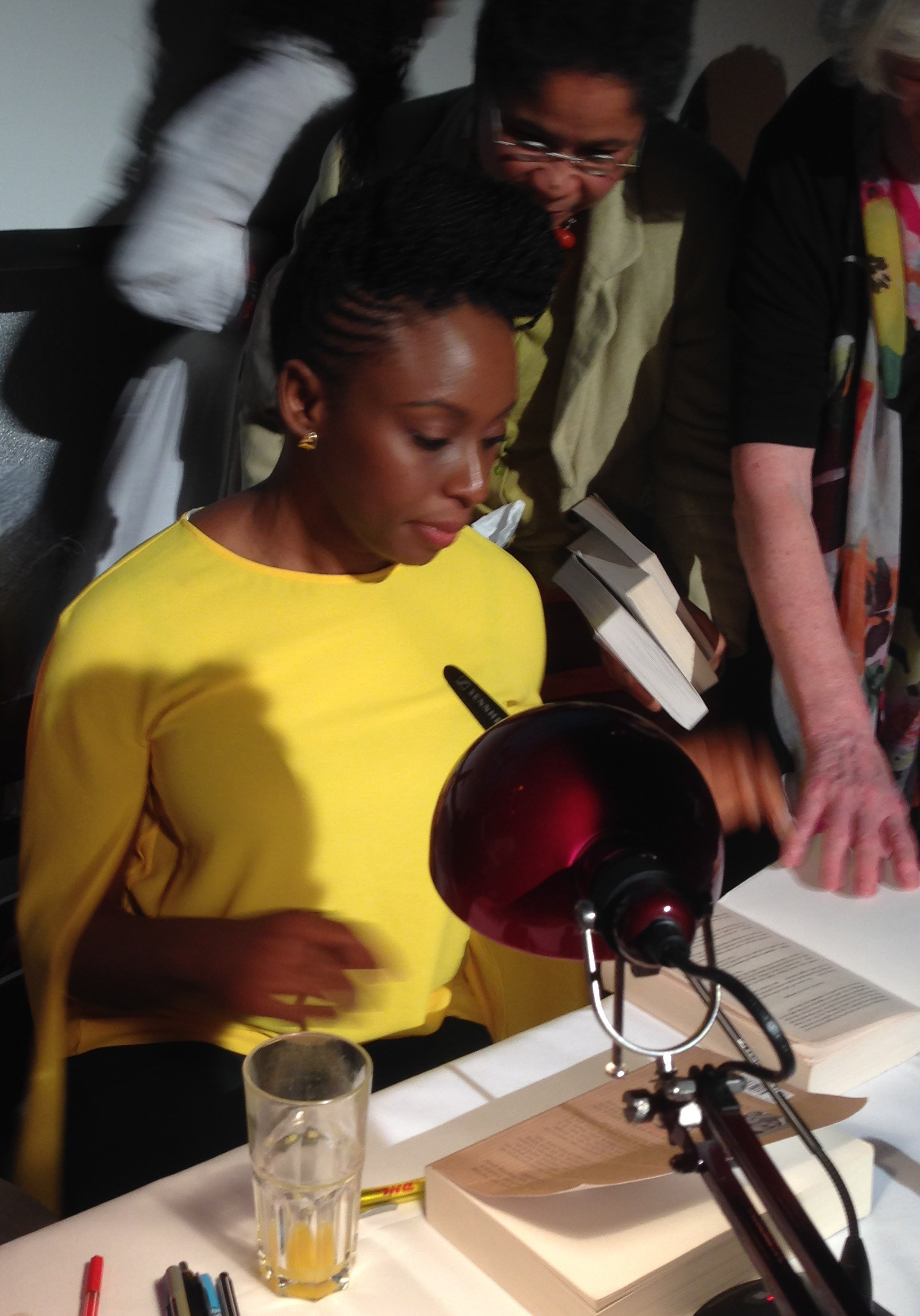
Adichie at the reading and signing of her work Americanah in Berlin, Germany (2014)

Adichie's third novel Americanah was published on 14 May 2013 by Alfred A. Knopf. It was published in France by Éditions Gallimard in 2015. She was a visiting writer at the University of Michigan–Flint in 2014. The Renowned African Writers/African and African Diaspora Artists Visit Series required her to engage with students and teachers from high schools and universities, patrons of the local public library, and the community at large in forums, workshops, and lectures that discussed Purple Hibiscus, Americanah, and her personal writing experiences. Clips from her talks "The Danger of a Single Story" and "We Should All Be Feminists" were aired at some of the events and discussed in the question-and-answer segment following her varied presentations.

In 2015, Adichie delivered a commencement address for Wellesley College. She co-curated the 2015 PEN World Voices Festival of International Literature in New York City, along with festival director Laszlo Jakab Orsos. She ended the festival with her "Arthur Miller Freedom to Write" lecture on censorship and opposition to injustices.

In 2015, Adichie wrote an email to a friend and later posted it on Facebook in 2016. Comments on the post convinced her to turn the post to a book, Dear Ijeawele, or A Feminist Manifesto in Fifteen Suggestions, which was published in 2017. In 2016, she was invited by the BBC to appear on Newsnight and give her thoughts on the 2016 election of Donald Trump. When she arrived at the studio, she was informed that the format would be a debate between her and R. Emmett Tyrrell, Jr., a Trump supporter and the editor-in-chief of The American Spectator, a conservative magazine. Tempted to walk out of the interview, she decided to continue because she wanted to discuss her views on how economic disenfranchisement had led to Trump's victory. The debate turned adversarial when Tyrrell said: "I do not respond emotionally like this lady," and then declared that "Trump hasn't been a racist". Adichie countered his statements, as an example citing Trump's statement that Judge Gonzalo P. Curiel could not be impartial in the case Low v. Trump University because of his Mexican heritage. After the debate, she wrote on her Facebook page that she felt ambushed by the BBC and that they had "sneakily [pitted her] against a Trump supporter" to create adversarial entertainment. In response, the BBC issued an apology for not informing her of the nature of the interview, but claimed that they had designed the programme to offer a balanced perspective.

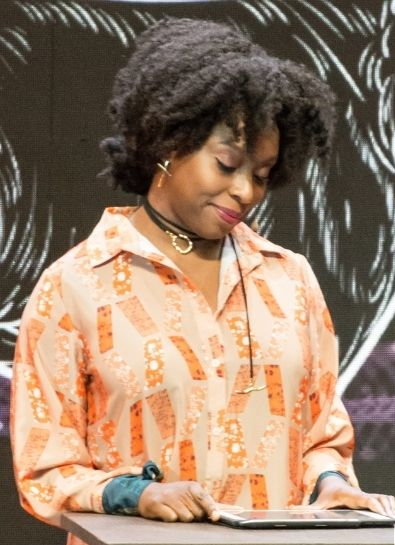
Adichie at the speaker's podium during the Congreso Futuro, Santiago, Chile, in 2020

Adichie delivered the second annual Eudora Welty Lecture on 8 November 2017 at the Lincoln Theatre in Washington, D.C. That year, she also spoke at the Foreign Affairs Symposium held at Johns Hopkins University on the fragility of optimism in the face of the current political climate. Adichie and Hillary Clinton delivered the 2018 PEN World Voices Festival, Arthur Miller Freedom to Write Lecture at Cooper Union in Manhattan. Although the speech was centered on feminism and censorship, Adichie's questioning of why Clinton's Twitter profile began with "wife" instead of her own accomplishments became the focus of media attention, prompting Clinton to change her Twitter bio. Later that year, she spoke at the Frankfurt Book Fair in Germany about breaking the cycles which silence women's voices. In 2019, as part of the Chancellor's Lecture Series, she gave the speech "Writer, Thinker, Feminist: Vignettes from Life" at Vanderbilt University's Langford Auditorium. The speech focused on her development as a storyteller, and her motives for addressing systemic inequalities to create a more inclusive world. Adichie has been the keynote speaker at numerous global conferences. In 2018, she spoke at the seventh annual International Igbo Conference. She delivered an address at the Hilton Humanitarian Symposium of the Conrad N. Hilton Foundation in 2019. She spoke on violence at the inaugural Gabriel García Márquez Lecture in Cartagena, Colombia in the same year. Adichie was the first African to speak at Yale University's Class Day, where she gave a lecture in 2019.

=== 2020–present: Children's book publication, career expansion ===
In 2020, Adichie published "Zikora", a stand-alone short story about sexism and single motherhood, and an essay titled "Notes on Grief" in The New Yorker, after her father's death. She expanded the essay into a book of the same name that was published by Fourth Estate the following year. In 2020, Adichie adapted and published We Should All Be Feminists in an edition for children, illustrated by Leire Salaberria. Translations of it were authorised for publication in Croatian, French, Korean, Portuguese, and Spanish. She gave a keynote address at the 2020 Congreso Futuro (Future Conference) in Santiago, Chile. She was the keynote speaker of the 2021 Reykjavik International Literature Festival held in the Háskólbíó cinema at the University of Iceland, and presented the talk "In Pursuit of Joy: On Storytelling, Feminism, and Changing My Mind". On 30 November 2022, Adichie delivered the first of the BBC's 2022 Reith Lectures, inspired by Franklin D. Roosevelt's "Four Freedoms" speech.

Adichie spent a year and a half working on her first children's book, Mama's Sleeping Scarf, which was written in 2019 and was published in 2023 by HarperCollins under the pseudonym Nwa Grace James. (Note: The pseudonym "Nwa Grace James was a dedication by Adichie to her parents, as Nwa means "child of" in Igbo.) Illustrations for the book were by Joelle Avelino, a Congolese-Angolan illustrator. In 2025, Adichie published her novel Dream Count, a novel about four African women whose lives intertwine as they face love, loss, and resilience across Nigeria and America. Following the release of the novel, she made a homecoming tour to Nigeria, with major events held in 27 June at Lagos; 3 July at Abuja, and in 5 July at Enugu. As part of her tour, Adichie served as a keynote speaker at the Things Fall Apart Festival.

== Style and themes ==
=== Writing styles ===
Adichie uses both Igbo and English in her works, with Igbo phrases shown in italics, followed by the English translation. She uses metaphors to trigger sensory experiences, for example, the arrival of a king to challenge colonial and religious leaders in Purple Hibiscus symbolises Palm Sunday. Her use of language referencing Achebe's Things Fall Apart invokes memories of his work to her readers. Similarly, the name of Kambili, a character in Purple Hibiscus, evokes "i biri ka m biri" ("Live and Let Live"), the title of a song by Igbo musician Oliver De Coque. To describe pre- and post-war conditions, Adichie moves from good to worse, as in Half of a Yellow Sun, where one of her characters begins by opening the refrigerator and sees oranges, beer and a "roasted shimmering chicken". By contrast, later in the novel, a character dies of starvation, and others are forced to eat powdered eggs and lizards. Adichie usually uses real places and historic figures to draw readers into her stories.

In developing characters, Adichie often exaggerates attitudes to compare the differences between traditional and western cultures. Her stories often point out failed cultures, particularly those which leave her characters in a limbo between bad options. At times, she creates a character as an oversimplified archetype of a particular aspect of cultural behaviour to create a foil for a more complex character.

==== Igbo tradition ====
Adichie gives her characters common names for an intended ethnicity, such as Mohammed for a Muslim character. For Igbo characters, she invents names that convey Igbo naming traditions and depict the character's traits, personality, and social connections. For example, in Half of a Yellow Sun, the character's name Ọlanna literally means "God's Gold", but Nwankwọ points out that ọla means precious and nna means father (which can be understood as either God the father or a parent). By shunning popular Igbo names, Adichie intentionally imbues her characters with multi-ethnic, gender-plural, global personas. She typically does not use English names for African characters but, when she does, it is a device to represent negative traits or behaviours.

Adichie draws on figures from Igbo oral tradition to present facts in the style of historical fiction. She breaks with tradition in a way that contrasts with traditional African literature, given that women writers were often absent from the Nigerian literary canon, and female characters were often overlooked or served as supporting material for male characters who were engaged in the socio-political and economic life of the community. Her style often focuses on strong women and adds a gendered perspective to topics previously explored by other authors, such as colonialism, religion, and power relationships.

Adichie often separates characters into social classes to illustrate social ambiguities and traditional hierarchies. By using narratives from characters of different segments of society, as she reiterates in her TED talk, "The Danger of a Single Story", she conveys the message that there is no single truth about the past. Adichie is encouraging her readers to recognise their own responsibility to one another, and the injustice that exists in the world. Nigerian scholar Stanley Ordu classifies Adichie's feminism as womanist because her analysis of patriarchal systems goes beyond sexist treatment of women and anti-male bias, looking instead at socio-economic, political and racial struggles women face to survive and cooperate with men. For example, in Purple Hibiscus, the character Auntie Ifeoma embodies a womanist view through making all family members to work as a team and with consensus, so that each person's talents are utilised to their highest potential.

In both her written works and public speaking, Adichie incorporates humour, and uses anecdotes, irony and satire to underscore a particular point of view. Adichie has increasingly developed a contemporary Pan-Africanist view of gender issues, becoming less interested in the way the West sees Africa and more interested in how Africa sees itself.

=== Themes ===
Adichie, in a 2011 conversation with Kenyan writer Binyavanga Wainaina, stated that the overriding theme of her works was love. Using the feminist argument "The personal is political", love in her works is typically expressed through cultural identity, personal identity and the human condition, and how social and political conflict impact all three. Adichie frequently explores the intersections of class, culture, gender, (post-)imperialism, power, race and religion. Struggle is a predominant theme throughout African literature, and her works follow that tradition by examining families, communities, and relationships. Her explorations go beyond political strife and the struggle for rights, and typically examine humanity. Many of her writings deal with the way her characters reconcile themselves with trauma in their lives and how they move from being silenced and voiceless to self-empowered and able to tell their own stories.

Adichie's works generally examine cultural identity, especially Igbo identity which celebrate the Igbo language and culture, and illustrate African patriotism, in general. Her writing is an intentional dialogue with the West, intent on reclaiming African dignity and humanity. A recurring theme in Adichie's works is the Biafran War. The war was a "defining moment" in the post-colonial history of Nigeria, and examining the conflict dramatises the way in which the country's identity was shaped. Half of a Yellow Sun, her major work on the war, highlights how policies, corruption, religious dogmatism and strife played into the expulsion of the Igbo population and then forced their reintegration into the nation. Both actions had consequences, and Adichie presents the war as an unhealed wound because of political leaders' reluctance to address the issues that sparked it.

The University of Nigeria, Nsukka reappears in Adichie's novels to illustrate the transformative nature of education in developing political consciousness, and symbolises the stimulation of Pan-African consciousness and a desire for independence in Half of a Yellow Sun. It appeared in both Purple Hibiscus and Americanah as the site of resistance to authoritarian rule through civil disobedience and dissent by students. The university teaches the colonial accounts of history and develops the means to contest its distortions through indigenous knowledge, by recognising that colonial literature tells only part of the story and minimises African contributions. Adichie illustrates this in Half of a Yellow Sun, when mathematics instructor Odenigbo, explains to his houseboy, Ugwu, that he will learn in school that the Niger River was discovered by a white man named Mungo Park, although the indigenous people had fished the river for generations. However, Odenigbo cautions Ugwu that, even though the story of Park's discovery is false, he must use the wrong answer or he will fail his exam.

Adichie's works about African diaspora consistently examine themes of belonging, adaptation and discrimination. This is often shown as an obsession to assimilate and is demonstrated by characters changing their names, a common theme in Adiche's short fiction, which serves to point out hypocrisy. By using the theme of immigration, she is able to develop dialogue on how her characters' perceptions and identity are changed by living abroad and encountering different cultural norms.

In Dear Ijeawele or A Feminist Manifesto in Fifteen Suggestions she evaluates themes of identity that recur in Purple Hibiscus, Half of a Yellow Sun, and The Thing Around Your Neck such as stereotypical perceptions of Black women's physical appearance, their hair and their objectification. Dear Ijeawele stresses the political importance of using African names, rejecting colorism, exercising freedom of expression in how they wear their hair (including rejecting patronising curiosity about it) and avoiding commodification, such as marriageability tests, which reduce a woman's worth to that of a prize, seeing only her value as a man's wife. Her women characters repeatedly resist being defined by stereotypes and embody a quest for women's empowerment.

Adichie's works often deal with inter-generational explorations of family units, allowing her to examine differing experiences of oppression and liberation. In both Purple Hibiscus and "The Headstrong Historian", Adichie examined these themes using the family as a miniature representation of violence. Female sexuality, both within patriarchal marriage relationships and outside of marriage, is a theme that Adichie typically uses to explore romantic complexities and boundaries. Her work discusses homosexuality in the context of marital affairs in stories such as "Transition to Glory", and taboo topics such as romantic feelings for clergy in Purple Hibiscus, as well as the seduction of a friend's boyfriend in "Light Skin". Miscarriage, motherhood and the struggles of womanhood are recurring themes in Adichie's works, and are often examined in relation to Christianity, patriarchy, and social expectation. For example, in the short story "Zikora", she deals with the interlocking biological, cultural and political aspects of becoming a mother and expectations placed upon women. The story examines the failure of contraception and an unexpected pregnancy, abandonment by her partner, single motherhood, social pressure and Zikora's identity crisis, and the various emotions she experiences about becoming a mother.

Recurrent themes are forgiveness and betrayal, as in Half of a Yellow Sun, when Olanna forgives her lover's infidelity, or Ifemelu's decision to separate from her boyfriend in Americanah. Adichie's examination of war shines a light on how both sides of any conflict commit atrocities and neither side is blameless for the unfolding violence. Her narrative demonstrates that knowledge and understanding of diverse classes and ethnic groups is necessary to create harmonious multi-ethnic communities. Other forms of violence are repeated themes in Purple Hibiscus, Half of a Yellow Sun and The Thing Around Your Neck; these themes symbolise the universality of power, or the impact and manifestation in society of its misuse.

== Views ==
=== Fashion ===
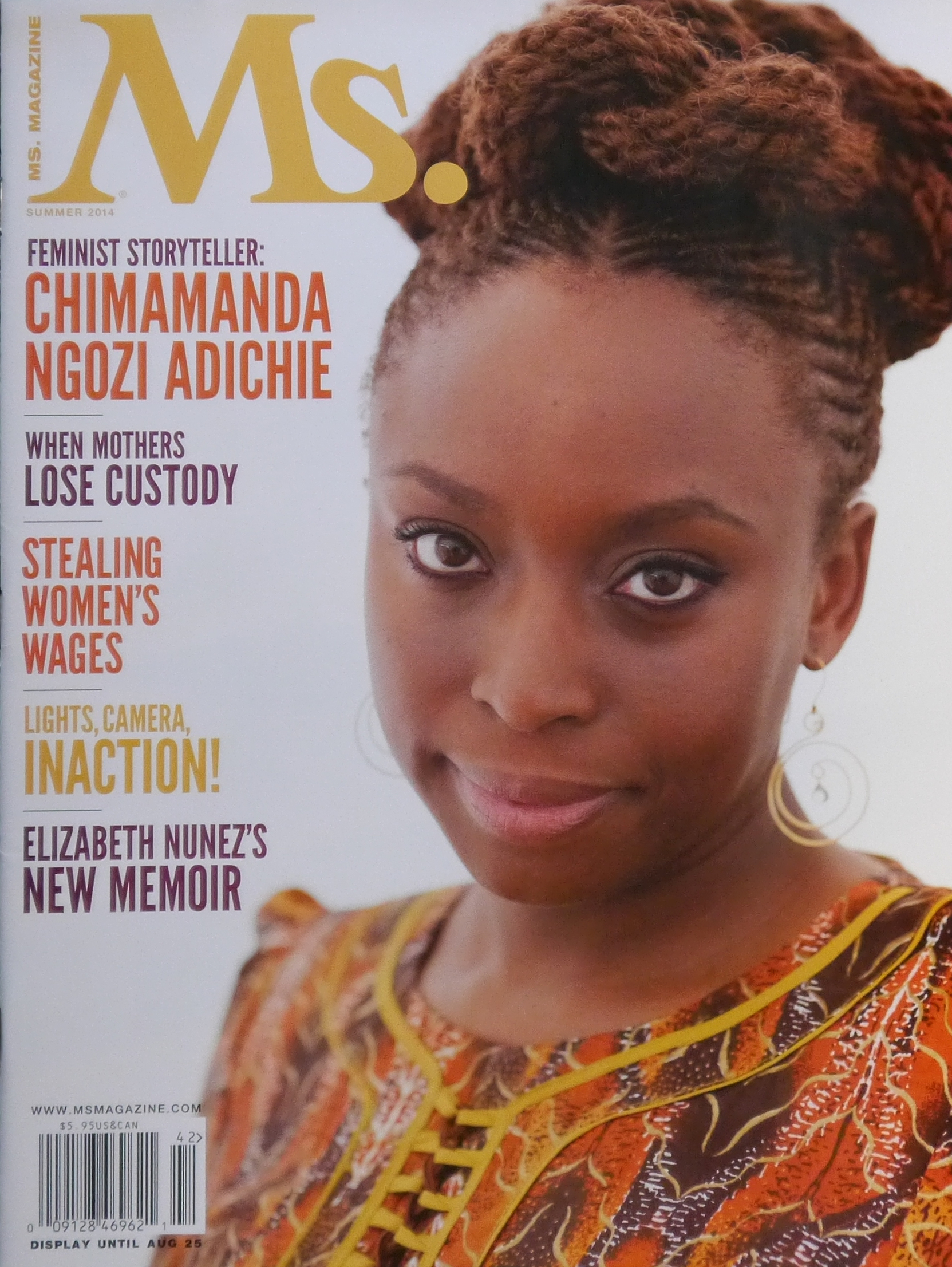
Adichie on the cover of Ms. in 2014

Adichie, in a 2014 article written for Elle, wrote that "women who wanted to be taken seriously were supposed to substantiate their seriousness with a studied indifference to appearance." According to her, the western concept contrasted with her Nigerian upbringing where one's attention to fashion and style correlates to the amount of prestige and respectability he/she will be given by society. She stated that people are judged the way they dress. Acknowledging the relationship between beauty, fashion, style and socio-political inequalities, Adichie became committed to promoting body positivity as a means to acquire agency.

Adichie was included on Vanity Fair's 2016 International Best-Dressed List, and cited Michelle Obama as her style idol. That year, Maria Grazia Chiuri, the first female creative director of French fashion company Dior, featured in her debut collection a T-shirt with the title of Adichie's TED talk, "We Should All Be Feminists". Adichie was surprised to learn that Dior had never had a woman rule its creative division and agreed to a collaboration with Chiuri, who invited her as an honoured guest to sit in the front-row of the company's spring runway show during the 2016 Paris Fashion Week. Scholar Matthew Lecznar stated that Adichie often challenges feminist stereotypes through references to fashion. He stated that allowing Dior to feature her text was a skillful way to use various media forms to not only deliver political messaging, but also to develop her image as a multi-faceted intellectual, literary and fashionable "transmedia phenomenon". She became the face of No.7, a makeup brand division of British drugstore retailer Boots. In her 2016 Facebook post Dear Ijeawele, or A Feminist Manifesto in Fifteen Suggestions, Adichie argued that minimising femininity and its expression through fashion and makeup is "part of a culture of sexism".

On 8 May 2017, Adichie announced her "Wear Nigerian" campaign on her Facebook page. She set up an Instagram account that her nieces Chisom and Amaka managed, and gained around 600,000 followers. According to Adichie, her goal was to help protect Nigeria's cultural heritage by showcasing the quality of craftsmanship and use of innovative hand-made techniques, materials and textiles being used by Nigerian designers. She won a Shorty Award in 2018 for the campaign, and in 2019 was selected as one of 15 women to appear on the cover of British Vogue in an issue guest-edited by Meghan, Duchess of Sussex. In a 2021 discussion at Düsseldorfer Schauspielhaus with the former Chancellor of Germany, Angela Merkel, and journalists Miriam Meckel and Léa Steinacker, Adichie said that she often uses fashion to educate people about diversity.

=== Religion ===
Although Adichie was raised as a Catholic, she considers her views, especially those on feminism, to sometimes conflict with her religion. As sectarian tensions in Nigeria arose between Christians and Muslims in 2012, she urged leaders to preach messages of peace and togetherness. Adichie stated that her relationship to Catholicism is complicated because she identifies culturally as Catholic, but feels that the Church's focus on money and guilt do not align with her values.

In a 2017 event at Georgetown University, she stated that differences in ideology between Catholic and Church Mission Society leaders caused divisions in Nigerian society during her childhood, and that she had left the church around the time of the inauguration of Pope Benedict XVI in 2005. She acknowledged that the teachings of Pope Francis, who was elected in 2013, and the birth of her daughter in 2016 drew her back to the Catholic faith and spurred her decision to raise her child as Catholic. By 2021, Adichie stated that she was a nominal Catholic and only attended Mass when she could find a progressive community focused on uplifting humanity. She clarified that "I think of myself as agnostic and questioning".

That year, her reflections on Pope Francis's encyclical Fratelli tutti were published in Italian in the 5 July edition of the Vatican's newspaper L'Osservatore Romano. In her 2021 article "Sognare come un'unica umanità" ("Dreaming as a Single Humanity"), Adichie recalled being berated at her mother's funeral for having criticised the Church's focus on money, but she also acknowledged that Catholic rituals gave her solace during her mourning.

=== Gay rights ===
Adichie is an activist and supporter of LGBT rights in Africa and has been vocal in her support for LGBT rights in Nigeria. When Nigeria passed an anti-homosexuality bill in 2014, she was among the Nigerian writers who objected the law, calling it unconstitutional, unjust and "a strange priority to a country with so many real problems". She stated that adults expressing affection for each other did not cause harm to society, but that the law would "lead to crimes of violence". Adichie was close friends with Kenyan writer Binyavanga Wainaina who publicly came out in 2014. Writer Bernard Dayo said that Adichie's eulogy to Wainaina in 2019 perfectly captured the spirit of the "bold LGBTQ activist [of] the African literary world where homosexuality is still treated as a fringe concept."

=== Transgender inclusion ===
Since 2017, Adichie has occasionally commented on transgender topics, with some remarks receiving criticism. In a 2017 Channel 4 interview, Adichie stated that the experiences of woman who "has lived as a man, with the privileges the world accords to men" are not the same experiences as "a woman who, from the beginning, has lived in the world as a woman". In a follow-up Facebook post, she wrote that transgender women and other women's experiences are different, and one could acknowledge those differences without invalidating or diminishing either group's lived experience. She stressed that cisgender girls are socialised in ways that damage their self-worth, which has a lasting impact throughout their lives, whereas trans women benefit from the advantages of male privilege, before transitioning. In response, Laverne Cox said that Chimamanda's claim did not reflect her own experience, sharing a series of tweets recounting her experiences growing up.

The issue emerged again in 2020 when Adichie said in an interview with The Guardian that she found J. K. Rowling's article on gender and sex "perfectly reasonable". The interview sparked a Twitter backlash from critics, which included a former graduate of one of Adichie's writing workshops, Akwaeke Emezi. In response, Adichie penned "It Is Obscene: A True Reflection in Three Parts" and posted it on her website in June 2021, criticising the use of social media to air out grievances. The following month, LGBT community students at the University of Cape Town, South Africa, boycotted her public lecture on their campus. Adichie stated in an interview with Otosirieze Obi-Young in September that she was "deeply hurt" by the backlash and that during the controversy, she had read anything she could find on trans topics to help clarify her understanding.

In late 2022, Adichie faced further criticism after another interview with The Guardian when she said, "So somebody who looks like my brother—he says, 'I'm a woman', and walks into the women's bathroom, and a woman goes, 'You're not supposed to be here', and she's transphobic?" The magazine PinkNews said that Adichie "remains insensitive" and that she was using "harmful rhetoric". Academic Cheryl Stobie said that Adichie supported an "exclusionary conceptualisation of gender". Researcher B. Camminga stated that Adichie's fame led to her comments on trans women being elevated and the voices of other African women, both transgender and cisgender, being silenced.

== Personal life ==
Adichie is Catholic. During her childhood, her family's parish was St. Paul's Catholic Church in Abba. She primarily lives in the US, where she has permanent resident status, but also maintains a home in Nigeria.

In 2009, she married Nigerian doctor Ivara Esege. Their daughter was born in 2016, and twin boys in 2024, as Adichie revealed in an interview with British newspaper The Guardian. According to her, the latter offspring were carried by a surrogate.

On 2 May 2015, Adichie's father was kidnapped and was released some days later. He died of kidney failure in 2020, during the COVID-19 pandemic. Her mother died in 2021.

On 7 January 2026, one of Adichie's twin sons, Nkanu Nnamdi, passed away at the age of 21 months following a brief illness and subsequent medical procedures in Lagos. Adichie publicly alleged medical negligence, including oxygen denial and sedation resulting in cardiac arrest, stating that her son "would be alive today if not for an incident at Euracare Hospital".

== Legacy ==
=== Influence ===
Larissa MacFarquhar of The New Yorker stated that Adichie is "regarded as one of the most vital and original novelists of her generation". Her works have been translated into more than 30 languages. Otosirieze Obi-Young pointed out in his cover story about Adichie for the Nigerian magazine Open Country Mag in September 2021, that "her novels ... broke down a wall in publishing. Purple Hibiscus proved that there was an international market for African realist fiction post-Achebe [and] Half of a Yellow Sun showed that that market could care about African histories". In an earlier article published in Brittle Paper, he stated that Half of a Yellow Sun's paperback release in 2006 sold 500,000 copies, the benchmark of commercial success for a book, by October 2009 in the UK alone. Her novel Americanah sold 500,000 copies in the US within two years of its 2013 release. As of 2022, "The Danger of a Single Story" had received more than 27 million views. As of 1 September 2023, the talk is one of the top 25 most viewed TED Talks of all time.

According to Lisa Allardice, a journalist writing for The Guardian, Adichie became the "poster girl for modern feminism after her 2012 TED Talk 'We Should All Be Feminists' went stratospheric and was distributed in book form to every 16-year-old in Sweden". Adichie has become "a global feminist icon" and a recognised "public thinker", as journalist Lauren Alix Brown observed. Parts of Adichie's TEDx Talk "We Should All Be Feminists" were sampled in the song "Flawless" by Beyoncé on 13 December 2013. Adichie was outspoken against critics who later questioned the singer's credentials as a feminist because she uses her sexuality to "pander to the male gaze". In defence of Beyoncé, Adichie said: "Whoever says they're feminist is bloody feminist."

Scholar Matthew Lecznar said that Adichie's stature as "one of most prominent writers and feminists of the age" allowed her to use her celebrity "to demonstrate the power of dress and empower people from diverse contexts to embrace [fashion] ... which has everything to do with the politics of identity". Academics Floriana Bernardi and Enrica Picarelli credited her support of the Nigerian fashion industry with helping put Nigeria "at the forefront" of the movement to use fashion as a globally-recognised political mechanism of empowerment. Toyin Falola, a professor of history, in an evaluation of scholarship in Nigeria, criticised the policy of elevating academic figures prematurely. He argued that scholarship, particularly in the humanities, should challenge policies and processes to strengthen the social contract between citizens and government. He suggested that the focus should shift from recognising scholars who merely influenced other scholars to acknowledging intellectuals who use their talents to benefit the state and serve as mentors to Nigerian youth. Adichie was among those he felt qualified as "intellectual heroes", who had "push[ed] forward the boundaries of social change".

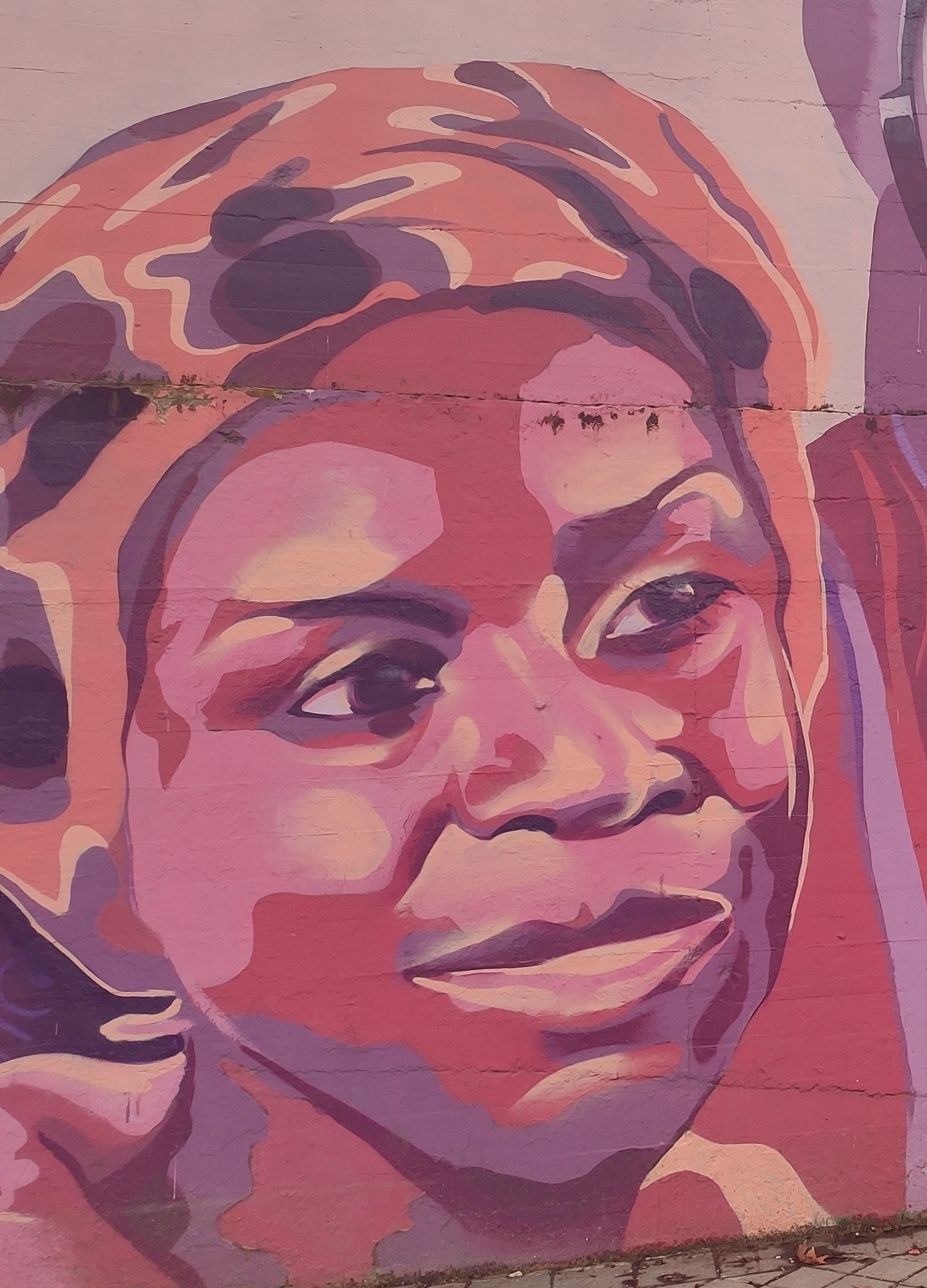
Adichie on the Concepción Feminist Mural in Madrid, Spain

Adichie's book Half of a Yellow Sun was adapted into a film of the same title directed by Biyi Bandele in 2013. In 2018, a painting of Adichie was included in a wall mural at the Municipal Sport Center in the Concepción barrio of Madrid, along with 14 other women. The 15 women were selected by members of the neighbourhood to give a visible representation of the role of women in history and to serve as a symbol of equality. The neighbourhood residents defeated a move by conservative politicians to remove the mural in 2021 through a petition drive of collected signatures.

Luke Ndidi Okolo, a lecturer a Nnamdi Azikiwe University said:

Adichie's novel treats clear and lofty subjects and themes. But the subjects and themes, however, are not new to African novels. The remarkable difference of excellence in Chimamanda Adichie's Purple Hibiscus is the stylistic variation—her choice of linguistic and literary features, and the pattern of application of the features in such a wondrous juxtaposition of characters' reasoning and thought.

Adichie's work has garnered significant critical acclaim and numerous awards. Book critics such as Daria Tunca wrote that Adichie's work is considerably relevant and stated that she was a major voice in the Third Generation of Nigerian writers, while Izuu Nwankwọ called her invented Igbo naming scheme as an "artform", which she has perfected in her works. He lauded her ability to insert Igbo language and meaning into an English-language text without disrupting the flow or distorting the storyline. In the judgement of Ernest Emenyonu, one of the most prominent scholars of Igbo literature, Adichie was "the leading and most engaging voice of her era" and he has described her as "Africa's preeminent storyteller". Toyin Falola, a professor of history, hailed her along other writers, as "intellectual heroes". Leslie Gray Streeter of The Independent said that Adichie's view on grief "puts a welcome, authentic voice to this most universal of emotions, which is also one of the most universally avoided." She has been widely recognised as "the literary daughter of Chinua Achebe". Jane Shilling of the Daily Telegraph called her "one who makes storytelling seem as easy as birdsong".

Adichie has gained wide praise for her speeches and lectures. Media and communications professor Erika M. Behrmann, who reviewed Adichie's TEDxEuston Talk, "We Should All Be Feminists" praised her as a "gifted storyteller", who was able to intimately connect with her audience. However, Behrmann criticised the lack of discussion in the talk on the intersectional aspects of peoples' identities and Adichie's reliance on binary terms (boy/girl, man/woman, male/female), which left "little room to imagine and explore how transgender and genderqueer" people contribute to or are impacted by feminism. Emenyonu said that her "talks, blogs, musings on social media, essays and commentaries, workshop mentoring for budding writers and lecture circuit discourses ... expand and define her mission as a writer". Scholar Grace Musila said Adiche's brand encompasses her reputation as a writer, public figure, and fashionista, which expanded her reach and the legitimacy of her ideas far beyond academic circles.

=== Critical reputation ===
Adichie received a MacArthur Fellowship in 2008, with her other academic awards including the 2011–2012 Fellowship of the Radcliffe Institute for Advanced Study at Harvard University. In 2002, she was shortlisted for the Caine Prize for African Writing for her story "You in America". She also won the BBC World Service Short Story Competition for "That Harmattan Morning", while her short story "The American Embassy" won the 2003 O. Henry Award and the David T. Wong International Short Story Prize from PEN International.

Her 2003 debut novel, Purple Hibiscus, was well received, earning positive reviews. The book sold well and was awarded the Commonwealth Writers' Prize for the Best Book (2005), Hurston/Wright Legacy Award, and was shortlisted for the Orange Prize for Fiction (2004). Half of a Yellow Sun (2006) garnered further acclaim, including winning the Orange Prize for Fiction in 2007, the International Nonino Prize (2009), and the Anisfield-Wolf Book Award. Adichie's story collection The Thing Around Your Neck was the runner-up to the Dayton Literary Peace Prize for 2010. One story from the book, "Ceiling", was included in The Best American Short Stories 2011. Americanah was listed among The New York Times "10 Best Books of 2013", and won the National Book Critics Circle Award (2014), and the One City One Book (2017). Her book Dear Ijeawele, translated into French as Chère Ijeawele, ou un manifeste pour une éducation féministe, won the Le Grand Prix de l'Héroïne Madame Figaro in the category of best non-fiction book in 2017.

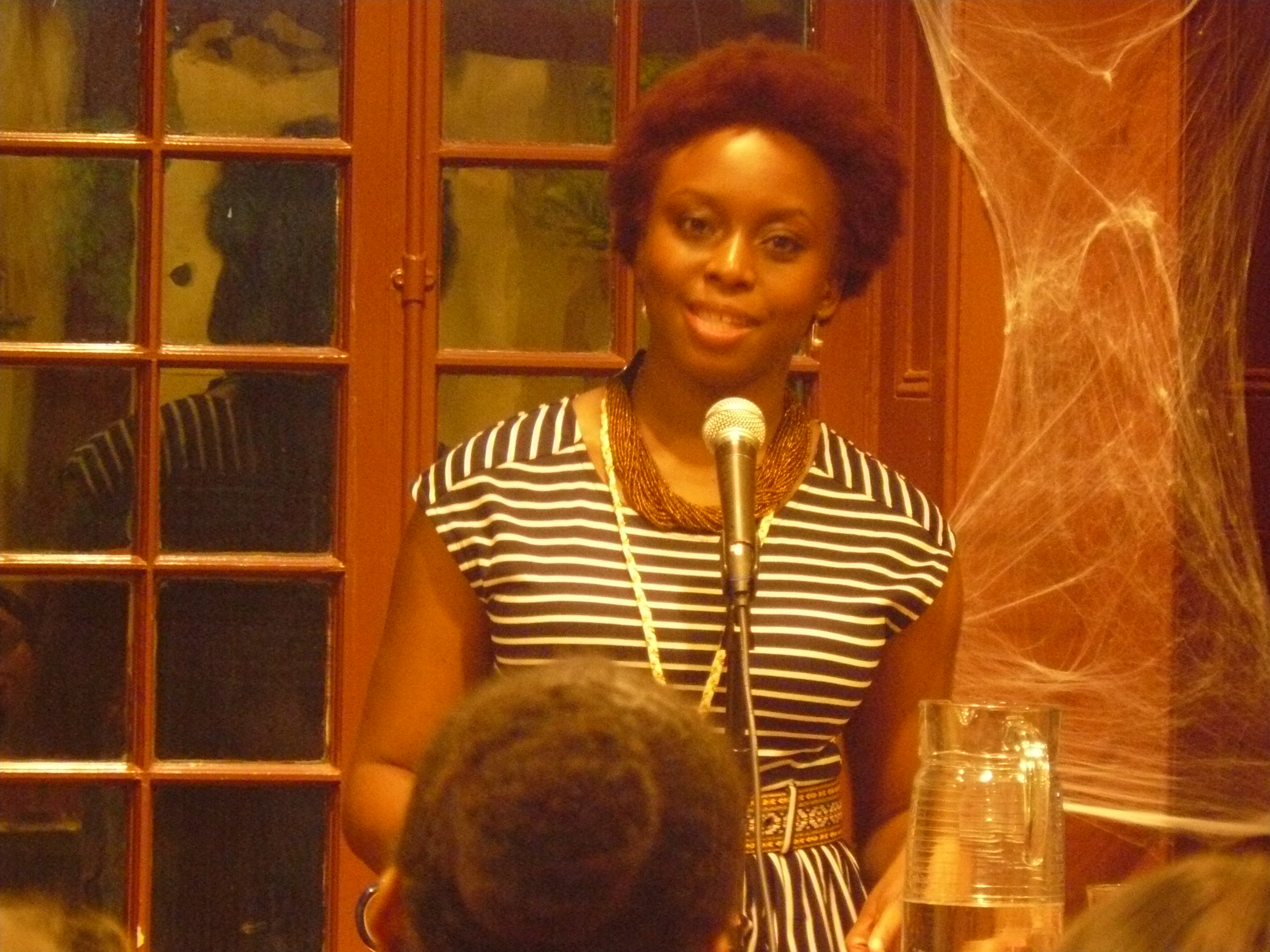
Adichie at an event related to her book The Thing Around Your Neck, 2010

Adichie was a finalist of the Andrew Carnegie Medal for Excellence in Fiction (2014). She won the Barnard Medal of Distinction (2016), and the W. E. B. Du Bois Medal (2022), the highest honour in the field of African and African American studies from Harvard University. She was listed in The New Yorker's "20 Under 40" authors in 2010, and in 2014 was selected for Africa39, a project initiated by the Hay Festival. She was named on the Time 100 list in 2015, and was on The Africa Report's list of the "100 Most Influential Africans" in 2019. In 2018, she was selected as the winner of the PEN Pinter Prize, which recognises writers whose body of literary work uncovers truth through critical analysis of life and society. The award recipient chooses the winner of the companion prize, the Pinter International Writer of Courage Award, for which Adichie named Waleed Abulkhair, a Saudi Arabian lawyer and human rights activist. The Women's Prize for Fiction, formerly known as the Orange Prize, selected 25 candidates for its Winner of Winners in honour of its 25th anniversary celebrations in 2020; Adichie's Half of a Yellow Sun won the award.

In 2017, Adichie was elected as one of 228 new members to be inducted into the 237th class of the American Academy of Arts and Sciences, making her the second Nigerian to be given the honour after Wole Soyinka. As of March 2022, Adichie had received 16 honorary degrees from universities President of Nigeria Muhammadu Buhari selected her as a recipient of the Order of the Federal Republic in 2022, but Adichie rejected the national distinction. On 30 December 2022, Adichie was honoured with the title of "Odeluwa", a chieftaincy position, by her hometown of Abba in Anambra State, making her the first woman to receive a chieftaincy title in Abba.

== Bibliography ==
=== Novels ===
- Adichie, Chimamanda Ngozi (2003). Purple Hibiscus (hardcover 1st ed.). London: Fourth Estate.
- —— (2006). Half of a Yellow Sun (hardcover 1st ed.). London: Fourth Estate. ISBN 978-1-4000-4416-0.
- —— (2013). Americanah (hardcover 1st ed.). New York: Alfred A. Knopf.
- —— (2025). Dream Count (hardcover 1st ed.). New York: Alfred A. Knopf. ISBN 978-0-593-80272-4.

=== Short story collections ===
- —— (2009). The Thing Around Your Neck (hardcover 1st ed.). New York: Alfred A. Knopf.

=== Memoirs ===
- —— (2021). Notes on Grief (hardcover 1st ed.). New York: Alfred A. Knopf.

=== Nonfiction books ===
- —— (2014). We Should All Be Feminists (paperback 1st ed.). New York: Anchor Books. ISBN 978-1-101-91176-1.
- —— (2017). Dear Ijeawele, or A Feminist Manifesto in Fifteen Suggestions (hardcover 1st ed.). New York: Alfred A. Knopf.
