= Purple Hibiscus =

2003 novel by Chimamanda Ngozi Adichie

- First edition cover
- Author: Chimamanda Ngozi Adichie
- Language: English, Igbo
- Genre: Bildungsroman
- Published: 30 October 2003
- Publisher: Algonquin Books
- Publication place: United States (1st ed), UK, Nigeria
- Pages: 306
- Awards: Hurston/Wright Legacy Award for Best Debut Fiction (2004); Commonwealth Writers' Prize for Best First Book (2005)
- OCLC: 373915632
- Followed by: Half of a Yellow Sun

Purple Hibiscus is the 2003 debut novel by the Nigerian writer Chimamanda Ngozi Adichie. It follows Kambili Achike, a 15-year-old Nigerian teenage girl who struggles in the shadow of her father, Eugene. Eugene is a successful businessman, a beloved philanthropist, and a devout Catholic, who nevertheless violently abuses his family. A post-colonial novel, it received positive reviews upon publication. The novel was published in the United States on 30 October 2003, by Algonquin Books. A year later, Fourth Estate published the book in the United Kingdom and in 2006, Kachifo Limited published it in Nigeria.

While the novel dealt with the serious issues of religious fanaticism and follows the colonial effect on Nigeria also depicted in Achebe's Things Fall Apart, the novel is renowned for its stylic and thematic structure; the author's interweaving of both Igbo and English, and scene description to convey characterizations and action, demonstrates her as one of the third generation of Nigerian writers. Kambili Achike, the narrator has been described as a shy teenager yet depicted the moral hero while Aunty Ifeoma was seen as the feministic voice. The literary critic and editor Otosirieze Obi-Young explains: "Given its prominence on school curricula, Purple Hibiscus is perhaps Adichie's most read book in Nigeria—and the most pirated." As Bildungsroman: the characters psychological and moral growth from childhood to adulthood changes, particularly as seen in Kambili and Jaja's tough life in Eugene's house and later freedom in Aunty Ifeoma's house, the primary themes of Purple Hibiscus involve family life, social interactions, interpersonal relationships, influences, leadership, betrayal and cruelty. Scholars have noted that Adichie also addresses issues of religious hypocrisy, pretence and the Christian life in a contemporary Nigerian and African society.

Reactions to the novel are widely positive. After publication, the novel won several awards including the 2004 Hurston/Wright Legacy Award for Best Debut Fiction and the Commonwealth Writers' Prize for Best First Book in 2005. In 2004, it was shortlisted for the Orange Prize for Fiction and longlisted for the Booker Prize. From 2011 to 2015, the West African Examination Council (WAEC) included the novel in her syllabus, along A Woman in Her Prime by Asare Konadu. Purple Hibiscus was Adichie's third published work after Decisions (1997) and For the Love of Biafra (1998); both were her early written works. Adichie continued exploring the themes of aftermath of the Nigerian Civil War and feminism in her other works.

== Plot summary ==
Kambili Achike is a fifteen-year-old Nigerian girl from a wealthy family in Enugu State. The family is dominated by her father Eugene, who is a devout Catholic and businessman. Eugene is both a religious zealot and a violent figure in the Achike household, subjecting his wife Beatrice, Kambili, and her brother Jaja to violent abuse. Kambili tells the story beginning with Jaja missing the holy communion at church. Both earlier had lived at the house of their aunt, Ifeoma, with her three children. The household offers a different view of what they faced in their father's house. It practices a completely different form of Catholicism, making for a happy, liberal place that encourages its members to be inquisitive, form their own opinions, and speak their minds. Kambili and Jaja become able to voice out their opinions. While at Aunty Ifeoma's house, Kambili also falls in love with a young priest, Father Amadi, which awakens her sense of sexuality.

Unable to cope with Eugene's continual violence any longer, Beatrice poisons him. Jaja takes the blame for the crime in order to save his mother, and gets locked in prison. Aunty Ifeoma and her family moves to America after she is unfairly dismissed from her job as a lecturer at the University of Nigeria in Nsukka. Purple Hibiscus ends almost three years after these events as Kambili becomes a young woman at eighteen. Her brother Jaja is about to be released from prison, hardened but not broken by his experience there. Their mother, Beatrice, has deteriorated psychologically to a great degree.

== Principal characters ==
- Kambili Achike: Kambili is the protagonist of Purple Hibiscus. She is a female character and the novel's narrator. A 15 year-old teenager from the Achike household: brother Jaja; mother, Beatrice; father, Eugene Achike, her childhood was surrounded by her father's strict religious belief- catholicism and violent physical abuse. Kambili has a shy personality following her struggle for academic excellence and need to be safe in her patriarchal home.
- Eugene Achike: Eugene is Kambili's father and a Catholic man. His father was a pagan. He was portrayed as an autonomous man who abuses his children, but also loves them. Alexie Lorca describes him as paradoxical.
- Aunty Ifeoma: Hore describes Aunty Ifeoma as a liberal academic. She is also a Catholic and the aunt of Kambili and Jaja.

== Major themes ==
Purple Hibiscus explores post-colonial Nigeria during a military coup d'état and examines the cultural conflicts between Christianity and Igbo traditions within the dynamics and generations of a family, touching on themes of class, gender, race, and violence. Robert Anderson defined theme as the central idea of a literary work and asserts that a theme does not have the same meaning as the subject of a work. Luke Okolo argues that the subject of Purple Hibiscus is the effect of colonialism in Nigeria. He summarises the themes of the novel as family life, social interactions, interpersonal relationships, influences, leadership, betrayal and cruelty, and feminism as was seen through the character Aunty Ifeoma. Aunty Ifeoma was depicted as beautiful and natural woman, yet, she struggles with the generalized "woe of women". In a conversation between her and Papa Nnukwu, who was regretting permitting Eugene to join the Christian missionaries, she asserts that the missionaries are not the reason of Eugene's hostile attitude towards him. While she argues of her also joining the missionaries, Papa Nnukwu countered her asserting that "she is a woman" and "doesn't count". Okolo disagreed with the view following the reasons that Aunty Ifeoma took care of Papa Nnukwu until his death; comforts Kambili and Jaja to freedom and also their mother, Sister Beatrice."

Adichie juxtaposes Papa's family with her sister, Aunty Ifoma's. For instance, there is a garden of hibiscus in Papa's house, which has turned red due to daily cut, but also, Aunty Ifoma maintains a garden of same flower, which has constantly retained its purple colour. Jaja took flower at Aunty Ifeoma's place and planted it at home, but despite daily watering, it eventually dies. Okolo wrote that the experience means Jaja's quest for freedom in the Achike household failed following the hostility of the environment; Kambili and Jaja took their household living as the normal way of life until they experienced a better one when they visited Aunty Ifeoma's family in Nsukka for holiday.

The theme of religion especially the portrayal of Papa's religious fanaticism is one of the central themes of the novel. Fanaticism is a deep religious view and belief often through violence. Papa grew up when the Christian missionaries arrived in British Nigeria. He is dogmatic in that he hates other religions. For instance, he refers to Pentecostal denomination as "mushroom churches" (a reference to the large number 'sprouting'); he stopped his father, Papa Nnukwu, from visiting him and his family since he is a non-Christian. Papa Nnukwu, who follows Odinani, also hates Christianity, especially Catholicism, because he believed that the Christian doctrine of the Trinity caused his son's unruly behavior towards him.

Adichie has been considered as the literary daughter of Chinua Achebe. As Achebe portrayed the white men, Adichie recaptures the same political unrest as a result of colonialism and the Nigerian government; it involves the removal and subsequent replacement of the Vice Chancellor of the University of Nigeria in Nsukka; the killing of government opposers and political activists especially Ade Coker, an editor of Standard newspaper, who was assassinated for writing and publishing a story about Nwankiti Ogechi, a girl who was kept mute by the government.

The opening chapter of Purple Hibiscus shows an instance of the narrative's "persistent corporeal" emphasis to the function of the body and its figuring; the importance of the body narrative is underscored by graphic descriptions of intimate physical violence by Eugene, and by the focus of Kambili's narration, which Sandwith described as "a focalizing perspective that gives insistent, uneasy, and concentrated attention to the attitudes and attributes of the human form". Sandwith argues that the analysis of body in the novel is in relation to an established corpus of work on the body as a powerful political and cultural signifier, hence Purple Hibiscus is analysed for its representation of postcolonial Nigeria and political critique. For instance, the novel is set in post-independence Nigeria but the action is centred in the household of Eugene, however, the political views and events that took place beyond the family scene are narrated through the limited perspective of the narrator hence resulting in a shadowy, unspecified sense of social upheaval in which political events are heard secondhand, either as news broadcasts or refracted through the lens of Papa's pious Christian democratic viewpoint.

=== Hypocrisy, colonialism and politics ===
Purple Hibiscus portrays many themes. Hypocrisy is one of the themes as shown through Eugene, who generously serves the society as a philanthropist, but also abuses his family. For example, he donates bags of rice to the church, schools and to widows, but could not provide a cup of rice to his father who he condemns as a pagan.

Usually my family would crowd around the radio when there was a coup...all you have to do is listen to the radio, and they tell you, there's a new head of state. And then I would hear about things happening. People were shot and killed, people who would speak out against all the injustices of the government.

— Chimamanda Ngozi Adichie

Political instability is displayed throughout the novel while citing its historical significance. The themes of culture and tradition are explained in the local setting of the novel, and Adichie's use of folklores in the novel. It also touches cultural clash, especially when Eugene tries not to indoctrinate his extended family into the Catholic religion. The theme of perfectionism is captured through Eugene's high expectations of his children to excel academically in school by taking first position after their exams. Tragedy is dominated with the themes of death and destruction. For example, the death and funeral ceremony of Papa Nnukwu; the poisoning and death of Eugene, and the disintegration of his family. The characters of Purple Hibiscus are affected by the political unrest in Nigeria including the ills done by the political leaders and government officials. Eugene's sister Aunty Ifeoma, the aunt of Kambili tells her that Eugene is a "colonial product".

Melissa Shew argued that like Kambili who saw the hypocrisy of her father's actions and sought a different kind of spirituality and way of being despite her family's relatively high social status, we may not be creatures we typically take ourselves to be.

=== Patriarchy ===
Kambili narrates the abuse of her brother and mother in the hands of their father Eugene. The privilege of valuing sons over daughters is made evident in the way that women are less valued in the family on the basis of their gender. For example when the Achike family travels to their hometown Abba, the village women gets jealous of Jaja because as a male he will inherit his father wealth. Mtenje writes that "unlike Kambili who will get married elsewhere, Jaja being a male will ensure that money is kept in the family."

Ifechelobi writes that a patriarchal society is a male dominated society, hence the household of Eugene reflects the saying in George Orwell's Animal Farm, "All Animals are equal but some are more equal." She writes that Adichie uses Purple Hibiscus to envision the wicked, tyrannical, and hypocritical life of Papa, whose rigid rules give no space for freedom, and his strict dominance of his family is an example of the patriarchal state of many African families. For instance, when he broke the figurine of Beatrice, he neither felt sorry nor apologised, and even after the wife realizes the breaking, she was the one who picked the broken pieces as her husband gave her no word; He uses domestic violence as a method in leading his actions such as maltreatment and beating of his wife- to an extent of causing her to miscarriage - and children, and even pouring hot water on them; he praises himself for abusing his household since he considers their default as sin without sin. He considers violence as a way of restraining them of their sins.

=== Religion ===
According to Voice of Nigeria, Adichie asserts that she wrote Purple Hibiscus to explore the role religion plays in Nigeria. Also a Roman Catholic, she explores issues of faith in the private and public spheres in the novel. The novel depicts the seven sacraments, especially Baptism, Confirmation and Holy Eucharist. The sacrament of the Holy Eucharist is shown in the Masses celebrated by Father Benedict, Father Amadi, and by the priest in Abba. The Sacrament of Confirmation is shown in an encounter between Father Amadi and Amaka when she wants to receive the Sacrament. Father Amadi asked Amaka to choose her Confirmation name from a rough paper, on which he has written. Amaka rejects the name even after she was told of not using the name after receiving the Sacrament. He wants her an English name but Amaka questioned him about other Igbo names, such as Chiamaka (God is beautiful), Chima (God knows best), and Chiebuka (God is the greatest), and asked whether they do not glorify God in the same way as English names, Paul, Peter, and Simon. She does not receive the sacrament.

When Amaefule explains the liturgical inculturation, he writes that it is both present and absent in the novel. On the absence, in a sense that the Catholic liturgy is not positively united with Igbo culture as was seen in Father Benedict, who Kambili narrates that he changed many things at St Agnes Parish, Enugu, amongst them, demanding that the Credo and Kyrie must be recited only in Latin and that Igbo was not acceptable except for offertory, which he considers native songs; hand clapping should be done at a minimum lest the Mass be compromised. Amaefule argues that that if his prohibitions exists before his arrival, then he is imposing both his will and caprices on the people; the imposition is symbolic of his lack of appreciation of the language, culture, and custom of the people, hence, he is one who regards the Igbo and subsequently African as both barbaric and pagan. Adichie addresses the complexity of both cultural traditions with her childhood teachings. In Ifeoma's house, Kambili and Jaja experience the idea that "one can practice both native rituals and still be Catholic."

On the present which relates to instances where Catholic liturgy is united positively to Igbo culture, otherwise called the presence of liturgical inculturation. For example, in the Eucharistic liturgy celebrated by Father Amadi at St Agnes Parish, there is often less serious participation by the congregation because they are used to singing in English, while he sang in Igbo. Also, when Father Amadi celebrated the Holy Mass at St. Peter's Chaplaincy in Nsukka, and after the "Our Father", he did not say "Offer to each other the sign of peace", but instead, he sang an Igbo hymn, and said "Ekene nke udo...ezigbo nwanne m nye m aka gi. Aunty Ifeoma and her household resides in Nsukka and worship in St. Peter's Church. Kambili narrates that while at Aunty Ifeoma's house, their morning and night prayers are always said along with Igbo songs, which usually follows hand clapping.

Amaefule agrees that before the Vatican II, the use of vernacular in the Holy Mass and sometimes in other sacraments is prohibited as Latin is regarded as the only language for worship and the liturgy. After the emergence of Vatican II, the use of vernacular was allowed. Unlike Father Benedict, who insists that only some, and not all parts of the Mass, could be conducted in the vernacular. Kambili also recount how Father Benedict banned the use of local perhaps Igbo songs in Mass, except during the offertory time; Amaefule analyzed that his allowance of Igbo songs was neither because he values it nor was convinced of its spiritual and theological contents, instead, it is because it captivates the congregation, and encourages collection of large money.

Lack of liturgical inculturation is depicted in Father Benedict's sermon, where he constantly illustrate Jesus Christ, the Pope, and Papa. Amaefule argues that it isn't bad bad but also not the best since there are several entities like things, realities, humans, and objects in an environment that may be fit to illustrate the gospel as Jesus did in his preaching.

=== Silence and voice ===
Vawter argued that Kambili's narration is her chance to speak, which she barely does in her early life as she is depicted as a shy girl. The novel explores the themes of language and silence. The characters speak English in formal settings and Igbo in informal settings; Eugene rarely speaks Igbo and encourages his children to do so. Throughout the plot, characters struggle with communication and freedom of speech, especially within the Achike household, hence, a novel of silence.

=== Feminism ===
Githire Njeri wrote that a common view between Adichie and her female predecessors is feminism. She argues that Adichie embraces feminism as a political stance, and her body of works offers a paradigmatic illustration of the concerns that have always informed other feminist writers.

== Background ==
Adichie was born in Nsukka, Enugu State, which was one of the settings of Purple Hibiscus. By the end of 2002, she had written two literary works;a poetry book, Decisions (1997); a play, For the Love of Biafra (1998), as well as many short stories, and other pieces. Her work has been translated into more than thirty languages and has appeared in many publications including The New Yorker and Granta. Adichie's Igbo heritage and the complexities of postcolonial Nigeria played a significant in Adichie's work and themes such as cultural identity, class and belonging, and historical memory. She has cited Nigerian authors such as Chinua Achebe and Buchi Emecheta as influences on her work.

Adichie was attending the Eastern Connecticut State University when she started writing Purple Hibiscus. According to her, she wrote it during a period of homesickness and set it in her childhood home of Nsukka. She sent her manuscript to many literary agents and one of them told her to use the "African material" as background for a continued story set in America. Another rejected instantly with "NO" on the query letter and sent it back. Literary agents either asked for the setting to be changed from Nigeria to America to attract familiar readers, or the manuscript was rejected instantly. Djana Pearson Morris, an agent at Pearson Morris and Belt Literary Management, accepted the manuscript. Since Adichie was Black, Morris cited challenging commercial sales and sent the manuscript to publishers.

During the summer of 2002, Antonia Fusco, an editor at Algonquin Books, received the manuscript and accepted it for publication. Elizabeth Scharlatt, the then publisher at Algonquin, also recounted difficult challenges of the book publication as Algonquin was not driven by market trends or shareholder pressures. Although they launch new debut novel every season and since there was a small list in that year, all energy would be in promoting Purple Hibiscus.

=== Setting ===
Purple Hibiscus is set in South Eastern part of Nigeria. It captures the socio-economic and political status of Nigeria during the military rule of General Ibrahim Babangida and Sani Abacha. Most of the events occur in Kambili's residence in Enugu and others took place in the University of Nigeria, Nsukka, where character Aunty Ifeoma was a lecturer.

== Style ==
Adichie displays a wit that enhances the originality and symbolic nature of Purple Hibiscus. Structured into four parts, the first part, "Breaking Gods: Palm Sunday", introduces the conflict on Palm Sunday between Jaja and Papa because Jaja missed the Holy Communion. It creates suspense for the next part entitled "Speaking With Our Spirits: Before Palm Sunday": it explores within the Achike household; the religious views of Eugene, also called Papa, and the abusive living and struggle of freedom faced by the narrator Kambili, her brother Jaja, and mother, Beatrice. The third part entitled "Pieces of Gods: After Palm Sunday" portrays a dividing family while the fourth part, "A Different Silence: the Present", focuses on the experience of Jaja, and the family struggle for freedom. Hilary Mantel wrote that the secret of Adichie's style is simplicity, rhythm and balance, and she writes a poet's sentences.

Another major stylistic effect of the novel is symbolism and characters naming. For instance, the hibiscus flower garden at Papa's compound which turns red, and is opposite of Aunty Ifeoma's which has always retained its purple colour, shows danger, oppression, insecurity, and death as seen in Achike's household, but the purple one shows freedom, love, freewill and happiness as seen in Aunty Ifeoma's house. Adichie invents names for her major characters by their roles or what she wants to educate her audience with. For example, "Papa" means the head of a family; "Eugene" is a foreign Christian name, which Adichie uses to portray him as a product of colonialism, hence, he philosophically supports colonial rule. Jaja is a name derived from the historic figure, Jaja of Opobo, a King known for resisting colonial rule and ensuring the security of his people. "Papa Nnukwu" literally means grandfather as well as a wise grateful and courageous man who represents an ideal Igbo man and subsequently African by extension. Aunty Ifeoma is an Igbo name that means favour and literally, good thing. Adichie's major style is language, and was clearly shown in Papa among other major characters; he does not like to speak only Igbo language, and often mixes both Igbo and English wrongly. For example, the use of syntactic grammars such as "Come and greet the wives of our umunna", "Nekene, see the boy that will inherit his father's riches", and "the girl is a ripe agbogho"; using "the girl is a ripe agbogho" as an example, Okolo argues that it doesn't have the exact interpretation as "The girl is ripe" or "The girl is a ripe lass". He argues that they don't have the same meaning in an African setting. "Agbogho" means a mature girl, often considered ready for marriage, but "ripe" doesn't have the exact nature of a "fully grown or mature woman". Adichie also uses proverbs. For instance, when Papa restrained the traditionalist Anikwenwa from visiting his house, Anikwenwa replied "Ifukwa gi! You are like a fly blindly following a corpse into the grave", which implies Papa is thoughtless. The setting of the novel is Enugu, Nsukka, and Abba, and the plot is clearly blended. Scene description enhances literary realism. While Okolo criticised Adichie's code switching; her linguistic interweaving of English and Igbo language citing its possible effect on the fluency and understanding of the novel especially by non-Igbo speakers, he praised her stylistic weaving as "excellent".

Christian churches in Nigeria and Africa has for some time, imported priests vestments from the West. Liturgical Inculturation challenges the Nigerian churches to start making such clothes locally, and when Kambili recounts Father Amadi's short red robe, which he wore on Pentecost Sunday at St. Agnes Parish, the reality of liturgical inculturation asks for patronage local centers that make the vestments. By patronizing them, Amaefule believes that the Church is directly creating job for the members, and helping to prevail the "foreign thing is more beautiful" mentality that is prevalent in Nigeria.

== Publication history ==
Purple Hibiscus was first published on 30 October 2003 in the United Kingdom by Algonquin Books. Fourth Estate later published the book in 2004 in the United Kingdom and in 2006, Kachifo Limited published it in Nigeria.

=== Select translations ===
- Finnish: Purppuranpunainen hibiskus. Translated by Kristiina Savikurki. Helsinki: Otava. 2010. ISBN 978-951-1-24187-4.

== Reception ==
=== Influence ===
Ibrahim Mahama created Purple Hibiscus, a textile installation named after the novel; the installation comprises 2000 square metres of handwoven cloth covering the Barbican's Lakeside Terrace.

=== Critical reception ===
Purple Hibiscus is a sensitive and intimate story that brings a reader the innocence and delicacy of childhood, the struggle of maturing into adulthood and the blurred lines between love and hatred. Chimamanda Adichie uses her captivating and mature style of writing to artfully endear character to readers in the intimacy of her plot twists and experiences. Her sense of irony is impeccable as she strays lightly into political waters, post-colonial rule and religions. —The New Times review of Purple Hibiscus, 7 June 2016.

Jason Cowley, literary editor of New Statesman, wrote that Purple Hibiscus is the best debut he had read since Arundhati Roy'sThe God of Small Things, and Yale University lecturer Bill Broun in reviewing it called Adichie "the 21st-century daughter of that other great Igbo novelist, Chinua Achebe." Kirkus Reviews praised Adichie for "creating a compelling narrative—and a surprising punch at end." Östgöta Correspondenten stated: "Purple Hibiscus is a painfully brutal yet wonderfully moving educational novel about getting up and walking." Again, it praised Adichie's writing, "Purple Hibiscus could be a tragic, depressing read at best, but Adichie is the kind of dizzying storyteller who manages to lure the reader further and further into the story, until you can no longer resist. She fills the novel with nuances and colors, scents and flavors, and with cautious hope." Journalist Hephzibah Anderson of The Guardian praises Adichie's focus, writing that it "remains fixed on her heroine, enabling her to express the political in acutely personal terms, telling an intoxicating story that is at once distinctively feminine, African and universal." Sue Arnold, in a review, praised the novel's audio narrator Adjoa Andoh's characterisation of the Kambili, whose confused love/hate relationship with her father underpins the story, is stunning. Also, Rachel Redford, writing for The Guardian reviewed the audio version, and wrote: "This is an intense story of many fearful conflicts, not least between traditional Igbo religion and Catholicism, and between silence and speaking out, highlighted by the skilful narration and enriched by judicious use of the Igbo language." Siasoco says the novel is "vivid, authoritative, and true to the experiences of a teenage girl in contemporary middle-class Nigeria". Roy Sandip wrote in the San Francisco Chronicle that the novel "is at once the portrait of a country and a family, of terrible choices."

In 2004, Purple Hibiscus was shortlisted for the Orange Prize for Fiction and the John Llewellyn Rhys Prize, and longlisted for the Booker Prize. It won the Best Books for Young Adults Award by the Young Adult Library Services Association. It was listed in 2004 by The Daily Telegraph as one of the year's best fiction and won the Hurston/Wright Legacy Award for the Best Debut Fiction. In 2005, it won the Commonwealth Writers' Prize for the Best First Book and the "One Maryland, One Book" Programme in 2017.

== Bibliography ==
- Okolo, Luke (2017). "Thematic and stylistic analysis of Chimamanda Adichie's Purple Hibiscus". Ezenwaohaeto.
- Amaefule, Adolphus Ekedimma (15 April 2021). "The Roman Catholic Church in Nigeria and Liturgical Inculturation in Chimamanda Adichie's Purple Hibiscus". Ecclesiology. 17 (1): 72–90. doi:10.1163/17455316-bja10002. ISSN 1744-1366.
- Ifechelobi, Jn (26 November 2014). "Feminism: Silence and Voicelessness as Tools of Patriarchy in Chimamanda Adichie's Purple Hibiscus". African Research Review. 8 (4). doi:10.4314/afrrev.v8i4.2. ISSN 2070-0083.
- Wallace, Cynthia R. (2012). "Chimamanda Ngozi Adichie's Purple Hibiscus and the Paradoxes of Postcolonial Redemption". Christianity & Literature. 61 (3): 465–483. doi:10.1177/014833311206100311. ISSN 0148-3331.
- Umezurike, Uchechukwu P. (2022). ""Omelora": Orthodox and Disciplinary Masculinities in Chimamanda Ngozi Adichie's Purple Hibiscus". Men and Masculinities. 25 (4): 566–580. doi:10.1177/1097184X211063498. ISSN 1097-184X.
- Mtenje, Asante Lucy (31 October 2017). "Patriarchy and socialization in Chimamanda Ngozi Adichie's Purple Hibiscus and Jamaica Kincaid's Lucy". Marang: Journal of Language and Literature. 27 (1). ISSN 1816-7659.
- Ifrah Shahbaz (30 June 2023). "The Psychological Impact of Domestic Violence on Teenage Development in Chimamanda Ngozi Adichie's Purple Hibiscus". Sir Syed Journal of Education & Social Research. 6 (2). Sir Syed College of Education: 107–114. doi:10.36902/sjesr-vol6-iss2-2023(107-114). ISSN 2706-6525.
- Tunca, Daria (25 March 2009). "Ideology in Chimamanda Ngozi Adichie's Purple Hibiscus (2003)" (PDF). English Text Construction. 2 (1): 121–131. doi:10.1075/etc.2.1.07tun. hdl:2268/16540. ISSN 1874-8767.
- Oseghale, Francis (2013). "African Novel as a Work of Social Critcism: A Study of Chimamanda Adichie's Purple Hibiscus". LWATI: A Journal of Contemporary Research. 10 (2). ISSN 1813-2227.
- Kurtz, J. (2011). "The Intertextual Imagination in Purple Hibiscus". Ariel-a Review of International English Literature. S2CID 161928925.
- Stobie, Cheryl (2010). "Dethroning the Infallible Father: Religion, Patriarchy and Politics in Chimamanda Ngozi Adichie's "Purple Hibiscus"". Literature and Theology. 24 (4). Oxford University Press: 421–435. doi:10.1093/litthe/frq051. ISSN 0269-1205. JSTOR 43664418.
- Tunca, Daria (7 December 2009). "An Ambiguous 'Freedom Song': Mind-Style in Chimamanda Ngozi Adichie's Purple Hibiscus". Postcolonial Text. 5 (1). ISSN 1705-9100.
- Nwokocha, Sandra (2019). "Subversive responses to oppression in Chimamanda Ngozi Adichie's Purple Hibiscus". The Journal of Commonwealth Literature. 54 (3): 367–383. doi:10.1177/0021989417720817. ISSN 0021-9894.
- Fwangyil, GA (22 June 2011). "A Reformist-Feminist Approach to Chimamanda Ngozi Adichie's <i>Purple Hibiscus</i>". African Research Review. 5 (3). African Journals Online (AJOL). doi:10.4314/afrrev.v5i3.67356. ISSN 2070-0083.
- Mabura, Lily G. N. (2008). "Breaking Gods: An African Postcolonial Gothic Reading of Chimamanda Ngozi Adichie's". Research in African Literatures. 39 (1). Indiana University Press: 203–222. doi:10.2979/RAL.2008.39.1.203. ISSN 0034-5210. JSTOR 20109568.
- Stobie, Cheryl (1 January 2012). Gendered Bodies in Chimamanda Ngozi Adichie's Purple Hibiscus. Brill. pp. 307–326. doi:10.1163/9789401207393_020. ISBN 978-90-420-3453-2.
- W, Christopher E. "Countries of the Mind: Space-Time Chronotopes in Adichie's Purple Hibiscus *". ProQuest.
- Ouma, Christopher E. W. (2009). "Childhood(s) in Purple Hibiscus". English Academy Review. 26 (2): 48–59. doi:10.1080/10131750903336064. ISSN 1013-1752.
- Umezurike, Uchechukwu P. (2022). ""Omelora": Orthodox and Disciplinary Masculinities in Chimamanda Ngozi Adichie's Purple Hibiscus". Men and Masculinities. 25 (4): 566–580. doi:10.1177/1097184X211063498. ISSN 1097-184X.
- M, Robert Chandran; Govindaraj, Dr. C. (2022). "Renovation of Kambili in Adichie's Purple Hibiscus". SSRN Electronic Journal. doi:10.2139/ssrn.4023406. ISSN 1556-5068.
- Njeri, Githire (2023). "Feminist Matters: The Politics of Eating in Chimamanda Ngozi Adichie's Purple Hibiscus". Contemporary Women's Writing. 17 (3).
- Shew, Melissa M. (19 November 2020). "Questions: The Heart of Philosophy". Philosophy for Girls. New York: Oxford University Press. doi:10.1093/oso/9780190072919.003.0005. ISBN 978-0-19-007291-9.
- Sandwith, Corinne (2016). "Frailties of the Flesh: Observing the Body in Chimamanda Ngozi Adichie's Purple Hibiscus" (PDF). Research in African Literatures. 47 (1): 95. doi:10.2979/reseafrilite.47.1.95. hdl:2263/61065.
