= Half of a Yellow Sun =

2006 novel by Chimamanda Ngozi Adichie

- First edition cover, 2006
- Author: Chimamanda Ngozi Adichie
- Language: English
- Genre: Bildungsroman
- Published: 1 January 2006
- Publisher: 4th Estate
- Publication place: United Kingdom
- ISBN: 9780007225347 (1st edn hardback)
- OCLC: 225851591
- Dewey Decimal: 823/.92
- LC Class: PR9387.9.A34354
- Preceded by: Purple Hibiscus

Half of a Yellow Sun is a 2006 novel by Nigerian writer Chimamanda Ngozi Adichie. Set in Nigeria in the 1960s, the story follows Ugwu, a teenage houseboy who has moved from his village to work in a university town; his master Odenigbo, a mathematics professor with revolutionary views; and Olanna, the beautiful daughter of a wealthy Nigerian man, with whom Odenigbo is in love. When the Nigerian Civil War (1967–1970) breaks out, their lives are thrown into chaos.

The novel explores the traumatic diasporic experience triggered by the war, highlighting the displacement and loss of identity faced by people in a postcolonial land. It criticizes the legacy of British colonization, emphasizing the tension between artificial national borders and the primacy of deep-seated ethnic identities such as those of the Igbo people.

Reactions to the novel upon publication were largely positive, with praise for the novel's characters and its depiction of the Biafran War. Half of a Yellow Sun won the 2007 Women's Prize for Fiction and in 2013 was adapted into a film of the same name, written by Biyi Bandele and produced by Gail Egan and Andrea Calderwood.

== Plot ==
The novel has a non-chronological structure, divided into four parts which alternate between the early and late 1960s.

In the university town of Nsukka, Ugwu, a thirteen-year-old village boy, begins work as a houseboy for Odenigbo, a radical mathematics professor. Odenigbo’s home is a hub where intellectuals gather to debate Africa’s post-colonial future. They are soon joined by Olanna, Odenigbo's beautiful and educated girlfriend who abandons her life of privilege in Lagos to be with him, and her twin sister Kainene, who runs their father's company. Kainene also has a boyfriend, Richard, an English writer who visits Nigeria to explore Igbo-Ukwu art.

Four years later, ethnic tensions between the Hausa and Igbo people escalate into violence. Following a series of massacres, including the murder of Olanna’s aunt and uncle, the southeast of Nigeria secedes to form the independent Republic of Biafra. Odenigbo, Olanna, their young daughter Baby, and Ugwu are forced to flee Nsukka, eventually settling in the refugee town of Umuahia. They experience severe food shortages, constant air raids by the Nigerian Air Force, and an environment of paranoia.

The story jumps back in time to before the war, revealing Odenigbo fathering a child with a village girl named Amala, a betrayal orchestrated by his mother. In a spur-of-the-moment act of retaliation, Olanna sleeps with Richard. However, following the counsel of her Aunty Ifeka, Olanna chooses to forgive Odenigbo and raises Amala’s child, Baby, as her own.

Returning to the war, as the Biafran state collapses, the characters seek refuge with Kainene, who runs the refugee camp in Umuahia. As supplies run low, Kainene crosses the front lines in search of aid. She never returns, even after the end of the war.

== Background ==
Half of a Yellow Sun is a reference to the symbol on the Biafran flag.

Half of a Yellow Sun is the second novel of Chimamanda Ngozi Adichie; her debut, Purple Hibiscus, was published in 2003. She wrote Half of a Yellow Sun in three years, taking the title from an emblem on the Biafran flag. In an afterword titled "The Story behind the Book", she noted:

I grew up in the shadow of Biafra. It was as if the war had somehow divided the memories of my family. My parents have always wanted me to know, I think, that what matters is not what they went through but that they survived. I was concerned about people who lived in Biafra, telling their story in a way that gave it dignity and that is true.

Adichie, who was born seven years after the Nigerian Civil War and loosely based the novel on political events of Nigeria in the 1960s, explained that writing Half of a Yellow Sun was a personal journey for her, recounting how she lost both her maternal and paternal grandfathers during the war. Although she did academic research while writing, Adichie used stories from her parents and relatives to form the "skeleton" of the novel. After the first draft, Adichie consciously changed the novel's focus from being about international politics and events into a character-driven story. In a 2013 interview, she told Ellah Allfrey that "I want people to read this book and come away thinking what it means to be human."

=== Publication ===
Half of a Yellow Sun was originally published in 2006 in the UK by 4th Estate (an imprint of HarperCollins) and in the US by Knopf/Anchor (an imprint of Penguin Random House). A Nigerian edition was published by Farafina Books. The novel was published in Czech by BBart in 2008.

== Themes ==
Multiple scholars have described the novel as a Bildungsroman, which shows the development of Ugwu during the war from a naive village boy to a chronicler of the Biafran story. Scholars note that Adichie narrates a love story that includes characters from the different regions and social classes of Nigeria, and describes how the war and encounters with refugees affected and changed them. The novel frames the Biafran War not merely as a historical event but as a deep, structural trauma.

=== Postcolonialism and diaspora ===
Scholars often examine the novel through the lens of postcolonial theory, focusing on Nigeria as a colonial project and the systems of domination lingering even after independence.

Susan Strehle argues that the subject of the novel is the cost of diasporic experience in postcolonial Nigeria. She writes that Adichie creates rich metaphors for the public history of Nigeria in her characters, which reflect the divided heritage of the postcolonial subjects; hence, she presents the various conditions faced by refugees and migrants during the Biafran War. The violation of the social contracts in Nigeria, including the genocide of Igbos, strips the characters of their status as citizens, thereby propelling them into the diaspora as permanent foreigners. This is clearly shown by their experiences during the war, which include losing their houses as well as their homeland, Biafra.

Adichie has been an émigré since she was nineteen, which gave her the experience used in her writing about the diaspora. Before Half of a Yellow Sun, she had written on themes of immigration and diaspora in her first novel, Purple Hibiscus. In the novel, educated Southerners, including Odenigbo, disagree with a nation that they perceive treats them as outsiders.

=== National and personal identity in postcolonial Africa ===
The novel places Nigeria as a historical nation created in Europe by colonial masters. It is illustrated through the conversations of the faculty members at the University of Nigeria, Nsukka, the books read by Ugwu, and the essays and letters written by Richard, which assert the British encouraged tribalism and racial hierarchy through supporting the northern tribe.

During a conversation on African identity among the Igbo and Yoruba faculty members in Nsukka, neither Odenigbo nor his colleague Lara Adebayo agree to being "Nigerian". While Lara supports Pan-Africanism, where she argues that "all Nigerians are one", Odenigbo instead argues for tribal primacy, stating that pan-Igbo identity existed before colonisation and the concept of Africa as one race was something "created by the Europeans to exploit Africans".

I am Nigerian because the white man created Nigeria and gave me that identity. I am black because the white man constructed black to be as different as possible from his white. But I was Igbo before the white man came.

— Odenigbo, in Half of a Yellow Sun

== Legacy ==
By the beginning of 2009, over half a million copies of the book had been sold in the UK alone, according to The Guardian; according to France 24, the same number were sold in the United States by January 2015. The Hindustan Times reported in 2013 that the book had sold 800,000 English copies and been translated into 35 languages.

=== Critical reception ===
Mary Brennan of The Seattle Times praised the novel's narrative, describing it as "a sweeping story that provides both a harrowing history lesson and an engagingly human narrative". Mary Fitzgerald, in The Guardian, says the novel "focuses on individuals' thoughts and emotions, the subtleties of human relationships and the psychological legacies of colonialism". Kate Kellaway wrote that "the novel is an immense achievement. The foreign becomes familiar, a distant war comes close, a particular story seems universal. Nothing is falling apart for Adichie: everything is coming together."

The New Yorker praised the novel's characters, writing that "the characters and landscape are vividly painted, and details are often used to heartbreaking effect"; a similar observation was made by Ny Tid, which added that "what really makes the novel is the vivid portrayals of characters". Siobhan Murphy wrote in Metro that "Adichie nurtures our relationship with these characters in clear yet intimate prose, tenderly shaping their loves, losses, successes and failings, so the traumas visited on them reverberate all the more strongly", while Merle Rubin of the Los Angeles Times wrote that Adichie "deftly chronicles the wrenching experiences of her characters" but suggests she "occasionally passes up some potentially rich opportunities to delve into other aspects of her characters’ minds".

English art critic Alastair Sooke, reviewing for The Daily Telegraph, expressed his disappointment that the novel was not nominated for the year's Booker Prize. He also commented that "if there is a flaw to the novel, it is that Adichie does not sufficiently differentiate between the voices of Ugwu, Olanna and Richard – even though a constant theme is the importance of language as a political tool. But over the course of the book the characters burrow into your marrow and mind, and you come to care for them deeply – something that is all too rare when reading some of the trickier contemporary novels".

Andrée Greene of the Boston Review wrote that Half of a Yellow Sun touches on the same themes as Purple Hibiscus. In a review for The Millions, Kevin Hartnett pointed out that the novel explores war and motherhood. Following the novel's theme of war, Maya Jaggi compared it to Pat Barker's Regeneration Trilogy and Helen Dunmore's depiction of the Siege of Leningrad in her novel The Siege. Janet Maslin said she appreciates the author's exploration of war, noting that Half of a Yellow Sun is not a conventional war story "any more than is A Farewell to Arms or For Whom the Bell Tolls ". According to Heather Thompson in The Telegraph, Adichie succeeds "in tackling the horrors of this war, imbuing her portrayal of three disparate characters – a woman, a boy and an English journalist – with warmth, wisdom and an acute insight into human nature".

Rob Nixon of The New York Times wrote that Half of a Yellow Sun "honors the memory of a war largely forgotten outside Nigeria, except as a synonym for famine", also praising Adichie for "using history to gain leverage on the present". Christina Patterson of The Independent wrote that "the novel is a gripping portrayal of the horrors of war: the upheaval, the hunger and the brutalising fear. It's also packed with memorable characters, from houseboys to the cocktail-drinking coteries of the super-rich."

Naomi Jackson of Chimurenga wrote that the novel "does what a great novel is meant to do. It engages, capturing the reader's attention so completely that while reading one asks not whether the stories we engage with are true, but what these truths—suspended in the world the author creates—have to say about our humanity, the lengths to which we will go for love or an ideal or revenge".

Edwina Preston wrote, "what is most impressive about Half of a Yellow Sun is Adichie's ability to take a culturally definitive moment, delineate its many complicated threads and re-weave them into compelling original fiction". Martin Rubin described the novel as "a profoundly humanistic work of literature that bears comparison with the best fiction Nigeria and, indeed, the entire African continent". In his review for Scroll.in, Zachary Bushnell, a lecturer at the University of Delhi, says that "the pages of Half of a Yellow Sun turn with enough grace and speed to true history".

Literary Review's William Brett wrote: "Adichie lets the suspicion of horror take root first, and then allows it to sink in gradually. This kind of subtlety makes reading her an extraordinary, unsettling but ultimately satisfying experience." Writing for The Guardian, Maya Jaggi called it "a landmark novel". Aïssatou Sidimé, in a review for San Antonio Express-News, referred to Adichie's writing as "alluring and revelatory, eloquent", while adding that "Adichie is quickly proving herself to be fearless in the tradition of the great African writers." Nigerian writer Chinua Achebe commented: "We do not usually associate wisdom with beginners, but here is a new writer endowed with the gift of ancient storytellers", and said that Adichie "is fearless, or she would not have taken on the intimidating horror of Nigeria's civil war". The New York Times had a more mixed review of the book, noting that "at times Adichie's writing is too straightforward, the novel's pace too slack" but also that "whenever she touches on her favorite themes — loyalty and betrayal — her prose thrums with life."

Africultures wrote that Adichie "has the art of storytelling" and that "the language is very fluid with Igbo and Pidgin expressions that blend naturally with English and translate the poetry of Nigerian culture". In a review for the novel's audiobook read by Zainab Jah, James Kidd praised Jah, noting that "she is every bit as good when shifting between characters, and mixing English with Igbo."

=== Awards ===
Half of a Yellow Sun won the 2007 Women's Prize for Fiction. The novel was on the New York Times's "100 Most Notable Books of the Year" list in 2008. On 21 September 2019, it was ranked by The Guardian as the 10th best book since 2000. On 5 November of the same year, it was chosen as one of the BBC's "100 Most Inspiring Novels". In November 2020, it was voted as the best book to have won the Women's Prize for Fiction in the prize's 25-year history. In 2022, Half of a Yellow Sun was included on the Big Jubilee Read list of 70 books by Commonwealth authors selected to celebrate the Platinum Jubilee of Elizabeth II.

=== Censorship ===
On 14 February 2022, Half of a Yellow Sun was banned in the Hudsonville Public Schools district in Michigan due to the book's sexual and violent imagery. It was also banned in the Clay County School District in Florida, Beaufort County School District in South Carolina, and Granite School District in Utah.

== Adaptation ==
The novel was adapted into a film of the same name in 2013, premiering at the Toronto International Film Festival. Written by playwright Biyi Bandele and produced by Gail Egan and Andrea Calderwood, the film was released worldwide in 2014, starring Chiwetel Ejiofor (as Odenigbo), Thandiwe Newton (as Olanna) and John Boyega (as Ugwu).

== Sources ==
- Strehle, Susan (2011). "Producing Exile: Diasporic Vision in Adichie's Half of a Yellow Sun". MFS Modern Fiction Studies. 57 (4): 650–672. doi:10.1353/mfs.2011.0086. ISSN 1080-658X.
