= Kachifo Limited =

Nigerian independent publishing company

- Founded: 2004; 22 years ago
- Founders: Muhtar Bakare
- Country of origin: Nigeria
- Headquarters location: Lagos, Nigeria
- Imprints: Farafina Books; Farafina Educational; Prestige Books
- Official website: www.kachifo.com

Kachifo Limited is an independent publishing house based in Lagos, Nigeria. It was founded in 2004 by Muhtar Bakare. Its imprints include Farafina Books, Farafina Educational, and Prestige Books. From 2004 to 2009, it published the influential Farafina Magazine.

Kachifo's work is notable in postcolonial literature for helping lay "the foundations of a pan-African literary network" alongside Cassava Republic Press and Nairobi-based publishers Kwani Trust. Several Nigerian authors who have later achieved international success either worked at Kachifo or were first published by Kachifo, including Oyinkan Braithwaite, Petina Gappah, and Bisi Adjapon.

== Farafina Books ==
Farafina Books is an imprint of Kachifo Limited that publishes literary and popular fiction, textbooks, coffee table, general interest and children's books.

Farafina published the Nigerian edition of Chimamanda Ngozi Adichie's Purple Hibiscus, the winner of the Commonwealth Writers' Prize, and her Half of a Yellow Sun, winner of the Orange Broadband Prize for Fiction. Other award recipients include Sefi Atta's 2006 Everything Good Will Come and Nnedi Okorafor's 2005 Zahrah the Windseeker, both winners of the Wole Soyinka Prize for Literature in Africa.

== Prestige Books ==
Prestige Books is a subsidy publishing imprint of Kachifo Limited.

== Farafina Magazine ==
Farafina Magazine was a general-interest magazine with each issue compiled by a guest editor. Editors have included the writers Uzodinma Iweala, Molara Wood, Okey Ndibe, and Petina Gappah. It has featured the works of Wole Soyinka, Segun Afolabi, Uche James-Iroha, Funmi Iyanda, Dinaw Mengestu, Barbara Murray, Chimamanda Ngozi Adichie, Jackee Budesta Batanda, Helon Habila, Tosin Oshinowo, Patrice Nganang, Jide Alakija, and Nnedi Okorafor.
