= Fourth-wave feminism in Spain =

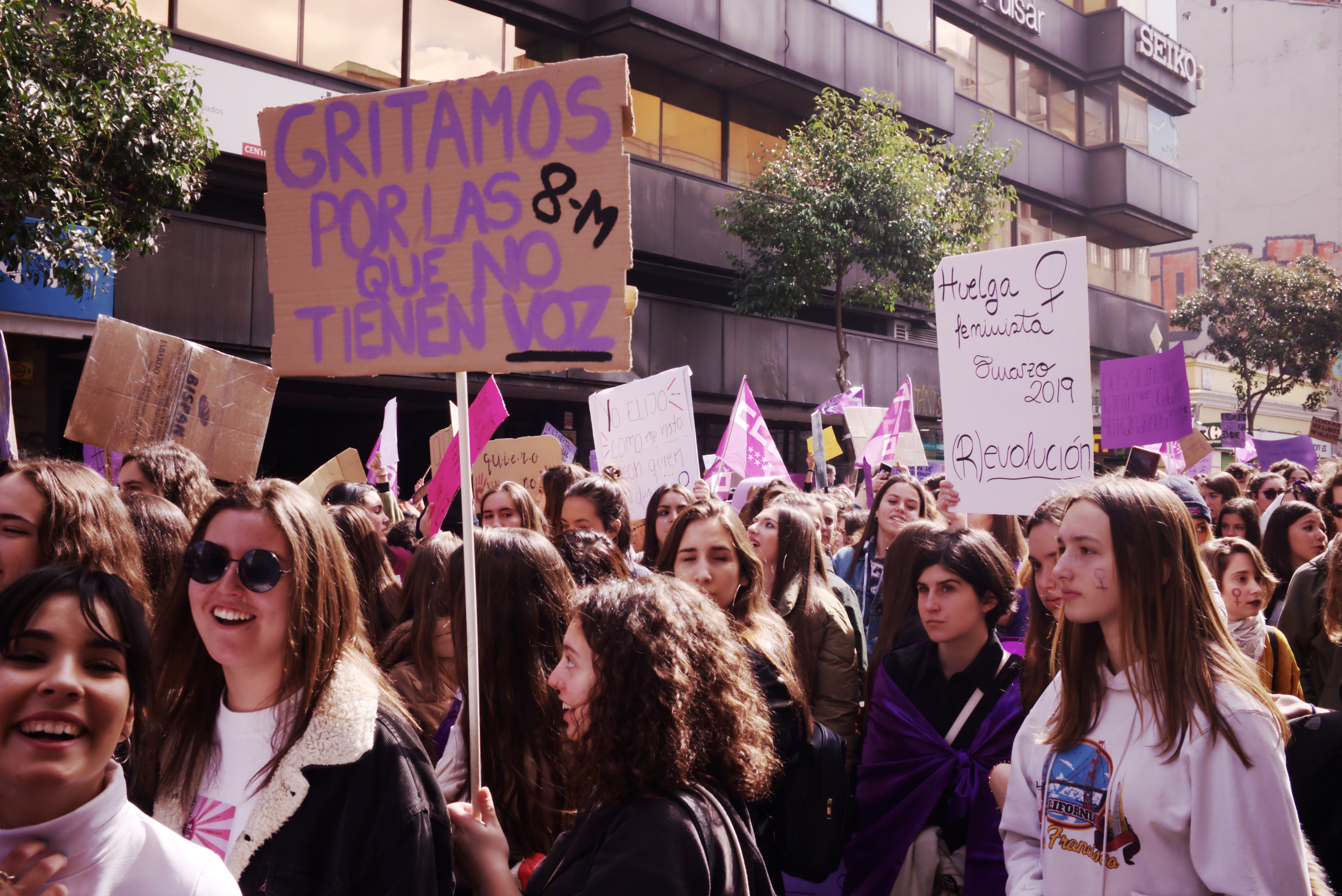
Demonstration on 8 March 2019 in Madrid, Spain. The sign reads: "We shout for those who have no voice".

Fourth-wave feminism in Spain is about digital participation in virtual spaces, encouraging debates and using collective force to enact change. It is about fighting patriarchal systems, denouncing violence against women, and discrimination and inequality faced by women. It is also about creating real and effective equality between women and men. It has several major themes, with the first and most important in a Spanish context being violence against women. Other themes include the abolition of prostitution, the condemnation of pornography, the support of legal abortion, the amplifying of women's voices, ensuring mothers and fathers both have access to parental leave, opposition to surrogacy (Spanish: vientres de alquiler), and wage and economic parity.

Major influences in this wave include Andrea Dworkin, Chilean feminist Andrea Franulic and works such as How to be a woman by Caitlin Moran, Room of One's Own by Virginia Woolf, The Second Sex by Simone de Beauvoir, We should all be feminists by Chimamanda Ngozi Adichie, and El diario violeta de Carlota by Gemma Lienas.

Fourth-wave Spanish feminism came out of a response to conservatism in the 1980s and a broader problem of feminists in Latin America and Europe succeeding in their goals, with feminism then largely coming under state control. These forces converged in the 1990s, as lipstick feminism, consumerist feminism and women started to make demands around gender and sexist violence in response to events like the murder of Ana Orantes in Granada on 17 December 1997. This led to media discussions around the portrayal of women and violence against women. Jokes about women being hit by boyfriends and husbands were no longer acceptable on television. This violence against women, coupled with female activists using the Internet to mobilize women to act, led to the fourth-wave advancing in Spain. In 2018, fourth-wave feminism began its peak in Spain as a result of a number of different factors, with women mobilized on a large scale to take to the streets. In 2019, issues important to fourth-wavers would be at the heart of many political conversations and a large part of the 2019 Spanish general elections.

There were a number of important events that helped spur this wave. This included the 2009 murder of Marta del Castillo, 2014 Tren de la Libertad, the first International Day for the Elimination of Violence against Women march in 2015, the murder of Diana Quer in 2016, the 2018 International Women's Workers Day general strike, and the 2018 La Manada rape case. Many of these events represented a first for Spanish feminist in that they represented the first period where women mobilized to protest against and condemn the institutional sexism of Spain's judiciary. Previous waves had focused on being allowed into the political sphere.

== Wave context ==
Much of the study of feminism uses Anglo-Saxon models of discourse. According to Italian academics like Rosi Braidotti, Gianna Pomata and Paola di Cor, this model can be problematic in the context of Mediterranean feminism as it ignores specific cultural baggage for women from the region. To compensate for this, Pomata suggests further elaboration of socio-historical context be given to properly situate this feminism in a broader global context. These models are also particularly problematic in a Spanish context as they fail to address the very nature of Francoism that sought to purge all female identity from society through forced assimilation legitimized by fear and violence. Internationally, comparisons can be difficult. Anglo-Saxon first-wave feminism is second-wave for Europeans and Latin American feminists. Second-wave American and British feminism is also third-wave for Europeans and Latin Americans.

Spanish feminism went through several waves in the Francoist period. Broadly speaking, they are first-wave feminism taking place from the mid-nineteenth century to 1965, second-wave feminism taking place from 1965 to 1975, and third-wave feminism taking place from 1975 to 2012. Fourth-wave feminism in Spain began in the mid-1990s. When resolving waves around the work of important Spanish speaking feminists discussing wave theory like Amelia Valcárcel, the Spanish fourth-wave may at times actually represent an international fifth wave, not a fourth one.

=== First-wave ===
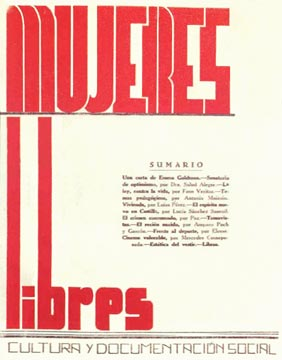
The first edition of Mujeres Libres, a magazine published by the organization of the same name. The organization would be an important first-wave Spanish feminist group during the Civil War.

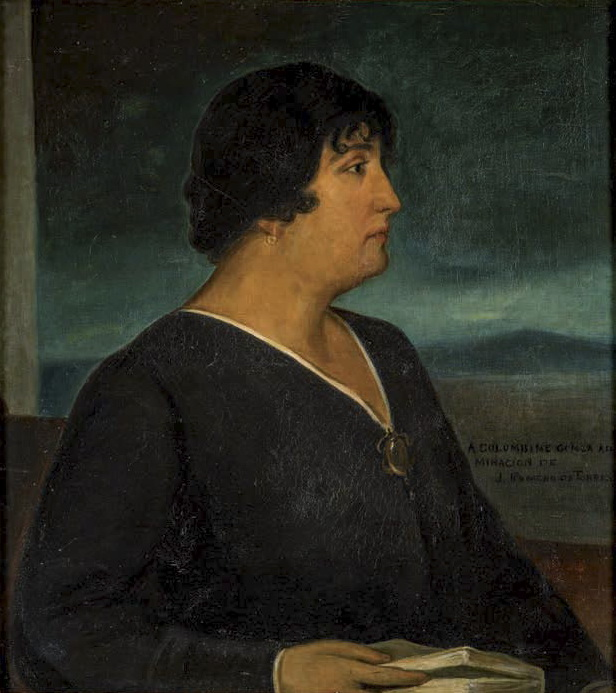
Portrait of Carmen de Burgos in 1917. Margarita Nelken, María Martínez Sierra, Carmen de Burgos and Rosalía de Castro were all important pre-Republic writers who influenced feminist thinking inside Spain.

First-wave Spanish feminism was about women assisting other women in improving their lives. Spanish first-wave feminism drew from eighteenth century with the Enlightenment and the French Revolution. Despite the revolutionary nature of the Second Spanish Republic and the Spanish Civil War as it related to the rights of women, neither resulted in a fundamental change in Spanish society's attitudes towards women. Patriarchy continued to play a huge role in the lives of Spanish women across both periods, and then into the Franco era. Following the end of the Spanish Civil War, many of Spain's leading feminists were forced into exile. Feminists in the Francoist period were largely divided by age and side of the Civil War they were affiliated with. The two primary age groups were those women born between 1910 and 1930, and those women born between 1930 and 1950. For Republican women born between 1910 and 1930, they often found themselves forced to submit in ways they had not had to previously and many of these feminists faced active persecution. Feminism and socialism continued to have a fraught relationship during the early Francoist period.

=== Second-wave ===
Second-wave Spanish feminism was about the struggle for the rights of women in the context of the dictatorship. PCE would start in 1965 to promote this movement with MDM, creating a feminist political orientation around building solidarity for women and assisting imprisoned political figures. MDM launched its movement in Madrid by establishing associations among the housewives of the Tetuán and Getafe in 1969. In 1972, Asociación Castellana de Amas de Casa y Consumidora was created to widen the group's ability to attract members. The 1960s in Spain saw a generational shift in Spanish feminist in response to other changes going on in Spanish society. This included greater contact with foreign ideas as a result of emigration and tourism, increased educational and employment opportunities for women and major economic reforms. Feminism in the late Franco period and early transition period was not unified. It had many different political dimensions. These varying movements all intersected in their belief that the need for greater equality for women in Spain and the need to defend the rights of women. Feminism moved from being out the individual to being about the collective. It was during this period that second-wave feminism came to Spain. Spanish second-wave feminists were mobilized in this wave around three primary issues: sexual harassment, sexual assault and prostitution. Women were repressed because they were viewed as interchangeable parts of a social contract focused around make desire. Fourth-wavers built on second-wave feminists by attempting to reclaim their bodies. This includes drawing on issues of the importance of beauty and sexual harassment. Fourth-wave feminists reclaim their bodies by insisting they will not tolerate art or entertainment that suggests women in high culture play secondary roles. This includes as being only objects of beauty or victims of rape, in roles that exult macho culture.

=== Third-wave ===
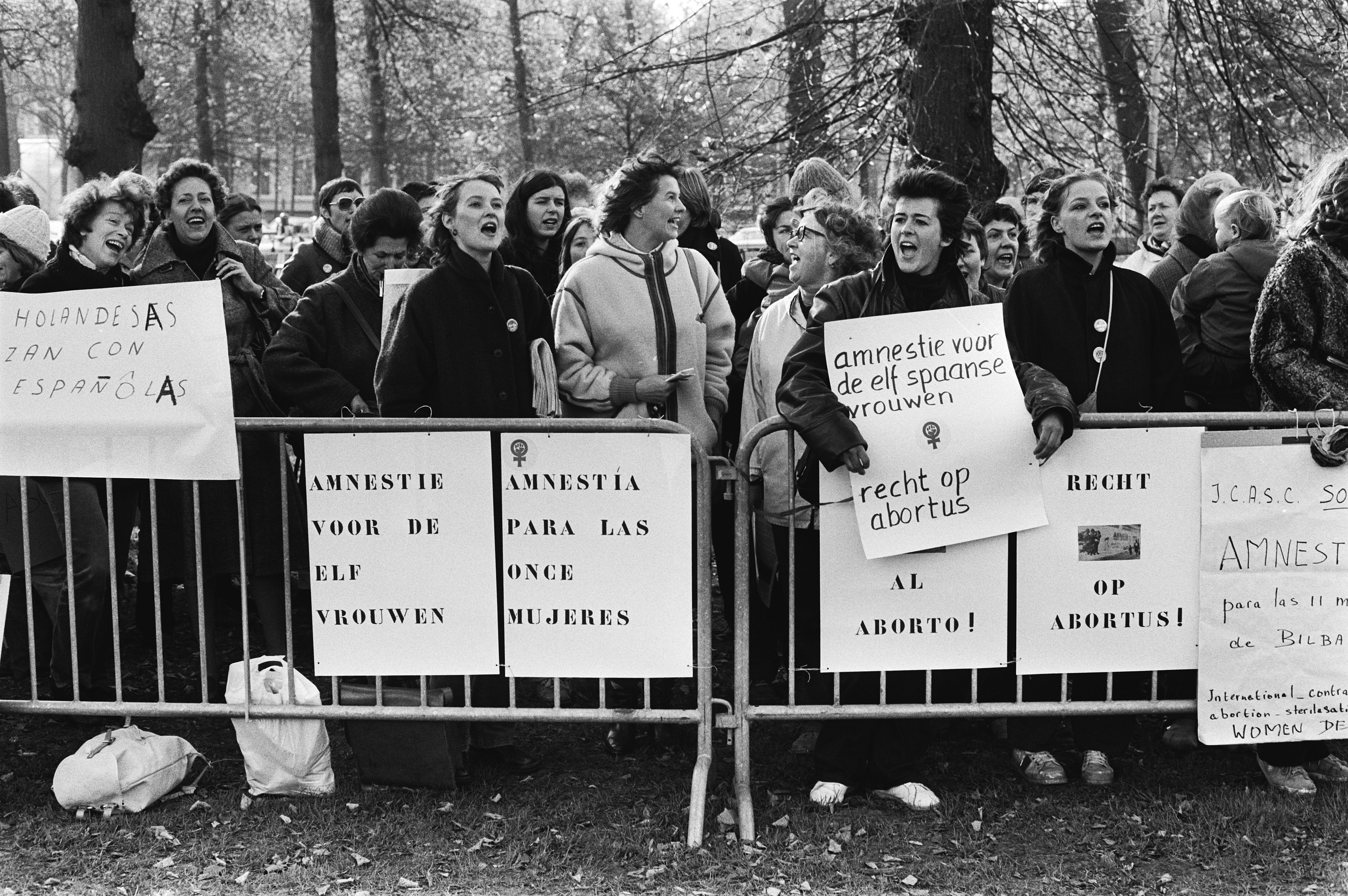
Demonstration of women in front of the Spanish embassy in The Hague against abortion processes in Spain in 1979. Women could be jailed in this period for having abortions.

Franco's death precipitated the start of the Spanish third-wave. Like many other western countries, this movement defined feminism as a social, political and cultural movement. Spanish third-wave feminism was the result of high-profile quarrels among leftist women and increasingly involvement of male dominated political organizations. This new wave of feminism was both similar and notably dissimilar to their American counterparts of the same name by being more explicitly socialist and politically focused on class in their orientation. Third-wave Spanish feminism focused on the autonomy of women in their ability to define their own priorities and strategies. The major organization in the wave's early history was Frente de Liberación de la Mujer, which was founded in 1976 in Madrid. Other third-wave feminist women founded Partido Feminist (PF) and Seminario Colectivo Feminista, an organization founded in 1976 as a result in a split inside PF. According to A. Valcárcel, "Without a recognizable feminist past, having suffered like the whole country the ablation of memory, we supplied ourselves with varied sources but it helped us a lot not to miss the very magnitude of the objectives we were facing." Third-wave feminism process wise was often about self-criticism. This process nearly destroyed feminism as a movement in Spain.

== Themes ==
Spanish feminist authors Pilar Aguilar, Luisa Posada, Rosa Cobo and Alicia Miyares all agree that Spanish feminism has moved into a fourth-wave. Fourth-wave Spanish feminism, existing since the 1990s, draws very specific roots to sexist and machismo violence enacted upon the bodies of women, and women's responses to this. Achieving equality is framed around ending such violence against women. Like every big feminist wave, this wave too faced massive patriarchal backlash.

Fourth-wave feminism is about digital participation in virtual spaces, encouraging debates and using collective force to enact change. Fourth-wave feminism is fragmented, and is not monolithic. This has forced the movement to be a space where feminists need to engage in dialogues with others and to acknowledge other points of view while everyone works towards overcoming patriarchal systems. Fourth-wave feminism posits that as rights are acquired, they need to be consolidated to ensure the state maintains protections needed by women and policies of equality around health, education and violence against women. Fourth-wave Spanish feminism draws from both equality feminism and institutional feminism. Fragmentation in the feminist movement leading into the start of the fourth-wave have led it to sometimes being called post-feminism or post-structuralist feminism.

Feminism is plural. Feminism has never been about a singular movement, singular ideology or being monolithic. Fourth-wave feminism encompasses many variants including ecofeminism, transfeminism, difference feminism, equality feminism, liberal feminism, radical feminism, libertarian feminism, Islamic feminism, Romani feminism, lesbian feminism and postcolonial feminism. It allows new points of views and different approaches to solving problems. Fourth-wave feminism, like other waves before it, is not about the existence of a single ideology or entity or collective. It is about drawing together in collective groups to work together towards a common goal of ending violence against women in order to free women to have the options to take the paths they desire; it is about mutual commitment to other women and about supporting other women.

Fourth-wave feminism is about fighting patriarchal systems, denouncing violence against women, and discrimination and inequality faced by women. It is about creating real and effective equality between women and men. It draws many young women into its ideology and actions. Fourth-wave feminism is about women re-drawing lines around their comfort and preferences when it comes to things being done to their bodies.

=== Violence against women ===
One of the most unifying elements of Spanish fourth-wave feminism is sexual violence. Sara Berbel says that patriarchy condones sexual violence against women, as a way of forcing women to go back to the home. Gender violence, macho violence and sexist violence are all used interchangeably among Spanish feminist to mean violence committed by men against their female partners, be they girlfriends, ex-girlfriends, wives or ex-wives. Fourth-wave feminists define machismo in a number of different ways. Feminist Alde! member Anabel Sanz defines it as, "feminism, rather than the opposite of machismo, is what opposes machismo." Journalist Irantzu Varela defines machismo as, "It is like saying 'neither freedom nor slavery', that is, putting in parallel a way of thinking and a struggle that claims that all people have the same rights and that they fight against all forms of oppression and discrimination, with an ideology that considers that men, just because they are, are superior and have the right to have privileges. "

The issue is important given the prevalence of such violence in Spanish society. A 2019 study found that 15.5% of all women from Aragon had been victims of sexual abuse, sexual assault or harassment. Of these 103,000 women from the region, most were under the age of 30. 45% of the incidents occurred at home, 20.3 at a woman's place of employment and 19% in public spaces. 38% of these acts were committed by a husband, boyfriend or partner, 17.7% by a co-worker, 16.5% by a friend or acquaintances, 15.2% by an unknown man and 10.2% by a father, stepfather or other immediate male family member. At the same time, 40% of men in Aragon think that such violence is rare or non-existent. In the case of sexual assault, 77.2% of women did not go to the authorities to report the crime. 88.6% of cases saw the aggressor not charged with the crime. Only 51.9% of Aragonese women received support from their friends or family after being sexually assaulted. Women do not report out of fear, fear of not being believed or fear of being exposed or of being question, out of a lack of confidence that the judicial system will treat them fairly or fear that the judicial system will attack them for reporting the crime.

In 2003, over 1,000 Spanish women were murdered by their partners. In 2004, 74 men were convicted of killing their female partners. In 2018, 47 men were convicted of killing their female partners.

Male voices are viewed as important in the fourth-wave. Sexual violence and sexual assault can only be reduced in Spain if men question traditional Spanish masculinity that says this is acceptable. Men's voices going silent is viewed by Spanish fourth-wavers as being silent accomplices. According to Federation of Progressive Women President Yolanda Besteiro, "Without men, we can not advance in equality; it is necessary for them to be involved so that women's lives are easier or not more complex because they are women." Journalist Irantzu Varela said, "the false allegations in terms of sexist violence are 0.0075% compared to 130,000 complaints". She went on to say, "in 2017, the General Council of the Judiciary could not show a single false report on gender violence, when, for example, in cases of robbery with violence they hover around 30%." Varela says the perception that this is a problem is a result of people "passing on all those false allegations that do not end in a final judgment, which is not sustained either logically or legally."

On 25 November 2018, large numbers of women took to the streets across Spain to protest against patriarchal violence.

=== Prostitution and abolitionism ===
Fourth-wave feminism also involves a rejection of prostitution. In Spain, the practice had grown much larger as a result of globalization and human trafficking. Philosopher Alicia Miyares says this has made the practice a new form of exploitation, treating women's bodies as commodities over which men have taken control. Defense of prostitution is viewed as a form of support for neoliberalism; fourth-wavers argue that these capitalists defenses of prostitution as free market forces in action ignore the reality that many women involved in prostitution lack the ability to make a free and personal choice to participate in the market as prostitutes.

=== Pornography ===
Fourth-wave feminism draws from second-wave ideologies and opposes pornography. PSOE deputy Ángeles Álvarez said, "If we do not allow the population to be poisoned with chemically toxic products, why do we allow them to be poisoned with toxic audiovisual contents?"

=== Abortion ===
The Council of Ministers announced a plan on 14 May 2009 to change Spain's abortion laws, allowing women to have abortions without a stated reason up until 14 weeks, and with the reason of fetal abnormalities or risk of physical or mental health of the mother up to week 22. The age of majority to make the decision to have an abortion was to be 16, and the law would make clear that no woman could be sent to prison for having an abortion. This was approved by the Plenary Congress on 17 December 2009 by a vote of 184 in favor and 158 opposed. It was then passed by the Spanish Senate on 24 February 2010, with 132 voting in favor, 126 voting against and 1 person abstaining. Following feminists success in modifying Spain's abortion laws in 2010, they were again met by a wall of patriarchal anger.

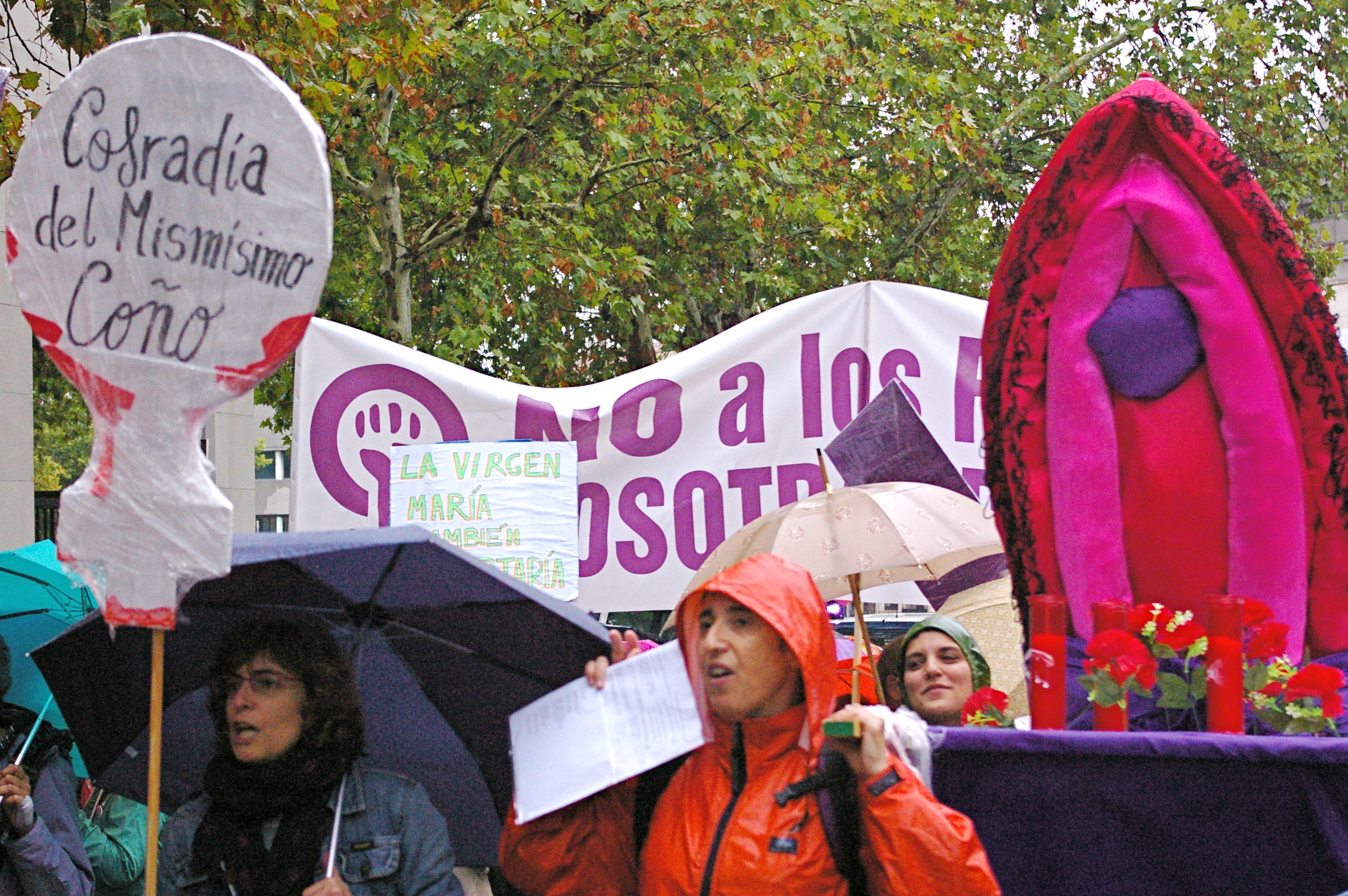
Protest for pro-choice in Madrid, Spain, 28 September 2012. "Deciding not a crime. Abortion Outside the criminal code."

In 2012, Spanish feminists celebrated for the first time the Global Day of Action for Access to Legal and Safe Abortion. The day had been created in Latin America during the 1990s. The demonstration took place against a backdrop of an expected announcement by Partido Popular Minister of Justice Alberto Ruiz-Gallardón announcing plans to introduce new, restrictive abortion measures that would set abortion legality back to a state prior to its legalization in 1985. Protests took place in Barcelona and Madrid. The Madrid demonstration was organized by Commission of Feminisms of 15-M, lasted two hours and involved marching from Puerta de Toledo to the Puerta del Sol. Event spokesperson Luisi Acevedo said of the event, "To the political and economic context that they have created, the Government also adds the ideological question that responds to the interests of ultraconservative parties and movements . They want to put us back in the role of the woman in charge, but we want to tell them that we are subjects with the capacity to decide about our life. [...] Abortion is not a crime, it is a right and it has to be outside the Criminal Code and within the public health network."

=== Women's voices ===
A particular concern of fourth-wave Spanish feminists is the credibility of women's voices. The assumed lack of credibility of women speaking out means that women are disadvantaged when reporting sexual harassment gender violence or sexual assault. This lack of credibility is viewed by fourth-wave feminists as endangering the lives of women; they are unable to turn to state institutions for protections. Women have been trying to amplify their own voices as part of this wave.

The judiciary frequently does not trust women's voices. According to Varela, this is because "they consider that we have to show that we have defended ourselves tooth and nail [or that] we even have to go with our heads under our arms to make us believe that we have been attacked."

=== Maternity and paternity ===
Spanish fourth-wave feminism has focused on the need for equal maternity and paternity rights. This is because parents having equal rights makes it easier to end cultural barriers that suggest women should remain in the home and take care of the children. It economically enables men the ability to be more involved in fatherhood from the start, either at birth or when they adopt a child.

Of Spain's judges and prosecutors, 90% who request a leave of absence are women.

=== Los vientres de alquiler (rented wombs) ===
In Spain, surrogacy is referred to as "vientres de alquiler" which literally translates to "rented wombs". The term surrogacy (Spanish: subrogación) is not used in feminist communities. Government documents range between using "rented wombs", "surrogate motherhood" and "gestation by substitution". Political leanings of the media impact their preferred usage, with ABC using Vientre de alquiler much more frequently and El Mundo instead using Gestación subrogada.

Fourth-wave Spanish feminists reject the concept of surrogacy. They see the practice as the capitalizing of female bodies for the benefit of men. They see it as supporting globalized poverty that is feminized, giving poor women in developing countries little choice but to use sell bodies for the benefit of the more affluent, making their bodies objects in a broader consumer culture. There is a rift between the gay male community in Spain and these feminists, with gay men supporting surrogacy so long as women are not compensated.

In April 2017, the Spanish feminist organization Stop Vientres de Alquiler was founded. Across its various presence on different social network, it has more than 10,000 followers. Their goal is to encourage the Spanish government to continue to ban womb renting, bring awareness around issues of violence promoted against women, girls and boys. They see the commercial and altruistic practice of womb renting as exalting of fatherhood while discarding the value of mothers. In September 2018, feminists succeeded in getting the American business Circle Surrogacy to cancel an event Hotel Sercotel Sorolla Palace in Valencia. Despite the cancellation, they marched in front of the hotel to bring awareness to the issue and how they did not think renting wombs should be acceptable in Spain.

The topic of rented wombs was a big one during the 2019 Spanish general elections. Ciudadanos became the biggest Spanish political party to support the practice, with the party's leader Albert Rivera claiming the practice was feminist. The party's candidate for mayor of Madrid Begoña Villacís said, "Everything that implies the absence of parents is feminist. I claim my autonomy. The State can not be my father and tell me what I can and can not do with my body. You can put caution, but not tell me what I can do. [...] One thing is as extreme as the other: those who tell you that you can not abort, as those who tell you that you can not gestate." PSOE spokesperson Purificación Causapié countered this, saying, "The effort of Albert Rivera to explain to us what is more or less feminist has an outdated smell of machismo." PSOE parliamentary spokesperson Adriana Lastra said, "Today, Rivera explains to us what feminism is, according to him."

=== Wage and economic parity ===
The Barcelona-based group 50a50 and the #Onsónlesdones initiative both were part of fourth-wave feminist movements to address issues around wage parity women face. They are comparable to Sheryl Sandberg's Lean In movement.

When men and women work the same job, they should earn the same pay. There is the potential for judicial oversight when this does not happen. In Spain, the gender wage gap is more a result of the feminization of some jobs, which consequently result in lower pay. UPV researcher Jule Goikoetxea gives the example of the male dominated mining industry to the female dominated cleaning industry, "This does not imply that, if a man works in cleaning, he earns more than a woman, but since it is a feminized sector, it turns out that the vast majority of the workers in this lower-paid sector are women." This situation does not exist by chance. At the same time, many jobs in Spain that are given to men are full-time positions within a company. Jobs given to women tend to be contracted out, with women getting less employment rights and lower pay as a result. Women are also likely to be offered more part-time contracts than men, which impacts their social security contributions and their ability to save for retirement.

A 2018 study found that during the previous year, the gender pay gap in Spain was 15%. 53.2% of members of the legal profession are women. Most do not gain positions of power within this system. No women was a member of the Consejo General del Poder Judicial (CGPJ) in 2017 or 2018, even though women make up more than half of Spain's population. This represents a broader problem, as Spain's constitution is celebrated for the rights Spanish women acquired but no women were involved in the process of writing the 1978 Spanish Constitution, nor were women consulted about what their needs and how they could be addressed in such an important legal document. As of 2019, Spanish women have also never been leaders of any of the major Spanish political parties.

== Influences ==
Andrea Dworkin has been a major influence on fourth-wave Spanish feminists, especially during the period of the late 1990s and early 2000s when many people had assumed feminism as a political movement in Spain was dead. In a 2000 interview, she said, "In feminism there seems to be no plan, no political organization. That has been the biggest gap between other feminists and me. I believe that the feminist movement is a political movement, and a political movement has objectives and strategy, and advances, and sometimes suffers defeats, but then it continues. A large number of women felt very good about discovering things they had not known before about the history and lives of women, but they were not prepared to strategically decide what we have to do, what we want and how we do it."

Spanish feminists were also influenced by the writings of Chilean feminist Andrea Franulic. In 2005, she said, "The official history of feminism is, fundamentally, a story that perpetuates the silence of autonomous thinking capacity in the history of women, and of feminism as a civilizing project; that is, it silences the possibility of a civilization other than the one in force."

Fourth-wave feminists draw inspiration from a number of historical and modern feminists texts. These include How to be a woman by Caitlin Moran, Room of One's Own by Virginia Woolf, The Second Sex by Simone de Beauvoir, We should all be feminists by Chimamanda Ngozi Adichie, King Kong Theory by Virginie Despentes and El diario violeta de Carlota by Lienas Gemma. We should all be feminists was translated into Spanish in 2016. Malala Yousafzai and Nawal El Saasawi are also popular authors among younger fourth-wave feminists in Spain.

== History ==
During the 1980s, conservative figures emerged around the globe that challenged gains women had made in the previous. This included figures such as Margaret Thatcher and Ronald Reagan. Their ideology would feed later ultraconservatives decades later including Marine Le Pen and Donald Trump, who accuse feminists of indoctrinating women with what they call gender ideology. At the same time, feminists in Latin America and Europe had also succeeded in some of their feminist goals, including the creation of state run institutions that explicitly promoted women's rights or where feminists decided to become involved in the government to enact feminist goals. While there was a lot of optimism surrounding the creation of these bodies, they also served to weaken feminist movements by having the state take over the implementation of feminist goals.

Spanish fourth-wave feminism started during the 1990s, as lipstick feminism and consumerist feminism was slowly starting to come to an end and as Spanish feminist were rejecting queer theory espoused by American academics. Fourth-wave Spanish feminism developed slowly, globally using the Internet as a mode of communication. This wave emerged from a new generation of women who had largely not been informed about previous waves through their education at high school, institutes and university. Knowledge about feminism was gained informally, and it developed a virtual academy where Spanish feminists learned that "the personal is political". Fourth-wave feminism emerged as a movement opposed to sexist violence, to masochist violence and to rape.

The movement traces its roots to the murder of Ana Orantes in Granada on 17 December 1997. She had dared to speak to the media about the abuse she suffered at the hands of her husband and was killed because of her speaking out, doing so on Canal Sur 13 days before she was burned to death by her abusive husband in her house. This early fourth-wave Spanish feminism was around using television and newspapers as the primary social network. Orantes' death took the topic of gender violence out of the privacy of women's home and brought it into a national context. Her death resulted in RTVE changing its policies on how the station reported on gender violence and sexist violence. Similar conversations took place at other television networks and media organizations across the country. Jokes about women being hit by boyfriends and husbands were no longer acceptable on television.

Journalists from El Mundo, El País and Infolibre would be among some of Spain's first participants in the nascent fourth-wave. From their positions in the media, they talked about a number of issues, mostly centered around sexist violence, both as a problem and its portrayal in the media. They later would go on to talk about Spain's gender parity pay problems and the glass ceiling for Spanish women. These journalists would also be the first ones to talk about taking activism to virtual spaces.

Early on, this new wave started rejecting academics like Judith Butler and other queer theorists, who during the late 1990s and early 2000s sought to erase women as political subjects by reframing everything as gender, by hiding the fact that aggressors against women were men and excusing men for their violence and oppression of women, of hiding the existing of lesbians, bisexuals, transsexual and asexual women as specific groups of oppressed people. Fourth-wave Spanish feminism is about reclaiming the word woman, and reclaiming the importance of the sexual and reproductive organs of women. Fourth-wave Spanish feminism is an explicit rejection of the individualistic theory espoused by queer theorists. Spanish fourth-wave feminism, borrowing heavily from socialist feminist, reject Butler's postmodern feminism that suppresses female identities and relies on academic theory over street activism. This was something Spanish fourth-wavers coming outside an academic institutional context shared with their Argentine sisters also going through a similar wave. The beginnings of this wave in this period were already taking place in Latin America, Poland and Argentina. Some of this global desire to act, particularly in a Polish context, came out of the World Conference on Women, 1995 in Beijing.

Over the next five years, coverage of the topic of violence against women would continue in the media. The Tani case, where a woman who was granted a pardon for a prison sentence in October 2000 as a result of her killing her abusive husband. This sparked a nationwide conversation about gender violence. Castilla-La Mancha President José Bono stepped into the discussion by suggesting the regional government should publish a list of all men convicted of killing their girlfriends and wives in order to further protect women. He continued to debate this issue in the media into January 2001.

Organic Law 1/2004 of Comprehensive Protection Measures against Gender Violence became the center of focus for many Spanish feminists in this early period, marking another important moment in this wave. Newly elected PSOE President José Luis Rodríguez Zapatero made passing the law one of his first legislative priorities. The law was passed unanimously in the Congreso de Diputados. Feminists faced severe blow back following the passage of the 2004 law by men who supported the patriarchal system that fostered such murders.

Another important law passed during this movement included the 2007 Law for effective equality of women and men. Some Spanish fourth-wavers began to reject Gay Pride events, believing they were just one more commodification of women's bodies, being used to market events for broader capitalist consumption while also serving to entrench patriarchy.

Social media would have an amplifying effect as the fourth-wave feminist movement began to grow. 2018 would be the year that fourth-wave feminism began its peak in Spain, Argentina and Brazil as a result of a number of different factors, with women mobilized on a large scale to take to the streets. Women's mobilization also challenged for the first time, the legitimacy of Spain's judiciary, whereas in previous waves the focus had been more on political leadership and acts of the legislature. The wave in Spain would also face a major challenge, including the emergence of Vox, a far right political party who won seats in Andalusia. Vox was opposed to and wanted to see it overturned. Mobilization by this wave would have the unintended impact of putting feminism at the front and center of the 2019 Spanish general elections, with feminists clashing with the male anti-feminism espoused by Vox. Ahead of the 2019 Spanish general elections, the far right Vox wanted to see Organic Law 1/2004 overturned. Right-wing Ciudadanos had held pretty much exactly the same position in 2015, but, following the fourth-wave feminist actions in 2018, had changed its own tune to support Organic Law 1/2004.

=== Marta del Castillo ===
17-year-old Seville resident Marta del Castillo disappeared on 24 January 2009. Her disappearance attracted national media attention. By 29 January, friends, classmates, neighbors and strangers had been mobilized on social media to solicit information to locate her and created montages to remember her. A video on the social network Tuenti received 10,000 visits within days. Police went into lock down, suggesting that the girl had left voluntarily. Women in Seville took to the streets following the murder of Marta del Castillo. On 31 January, a protest about del Castillo's disappearance was held in Seville with some 2,000 people attending. On 4 February 2009, the police say the girl did not voluntarily disappear. Three days later, on Saturday 7 February 2009, people again took to the streets. Their number increased by over a thousand to around 3,000. They demand that the government increase the number of police assigned to the case. Supporters paper the city with posters featuring del Castillo image. A week later, the police arrest her ex-boyfriend, 19-year-old Miguel Carcaño, who had confessed to murdering del Castillo during a fight by hitting her with an ashtray and then, with the help of a friend, dumping her body in the Guadalquivir River.

The next day, Carcaño's 14-year-old girlfriend, Rocío, appeared on television to talk about her own abusive relationship with the man. The following day, Prosecutor's Office decide to open proceedings against Rocío. They alleged that in explaining the abuse she experienced at the hands of Carcaño, the young girl caused "irreparable damage" to their case. On 18 February 2009, the chief prosecutor of Seville asked a judge to close the tribute page created on Tuenti. At the same time, Carcaño presence on Tuenti also disappears. People took to the streets again on 21 February 2009, this time asking the government to increase the sentence length for such murders. Three days later, the father of del Castillo went to Madrid to meet with Prime Minister José Luis Rodríguez Zapatero, asking him to pass legislation that would result gender violence related murders having a life sentence. Rodríguez Zapatero said he would study the topic, but rejected the idea of life sentences.

On 27 February 2009, the Audiovisual Council of Andalusia denounced media treatment of victims. They cited coverage specifically done by Telecinco and Antena 3. The next day, the petition created asking for life in prison for murder had attracted 50,000 signatures. In early March, del Castillo's parents say that the on-line montages featuring their daughter play an important role in ensuring that the memory of his daughter is not erased. Also in early March, the Senate, as a result of the new Minister of Justice Francisco Caamaño's decision, ruled out any changes to Spain's criminal code to make life in prison a potential sentence for murder. Carcaño started to change dramatically.

On 24 January 2012, demonstrations are held in more than 40 Spanish cities and in Munich, Germany. They celebrate the sentence of 20 years in prison for Carcaño, a sentence which was then appealed. On 24 January 2019, 4,000 people again took to the streets of Seville in memory of Marta del Castillo, ten years after her disappearance. People came from several cities and autonomous communities in Spain, some who were families of women who had also been victimized in similar ways. During the protest, del Castillo's family demanded that the trial of the accused be repeated. Partido Popular Minister of the Interior and former mayor of Seville Juan Ignacio Zoido was among those taking place in the march. Vox spokesman in the Andalusian Parliament Francisco Serrano also participated. Sandra Palo's mother María del Mar Bermúdez also participated in the march.

=== Tren de la Libertad ===
The Freedom Train
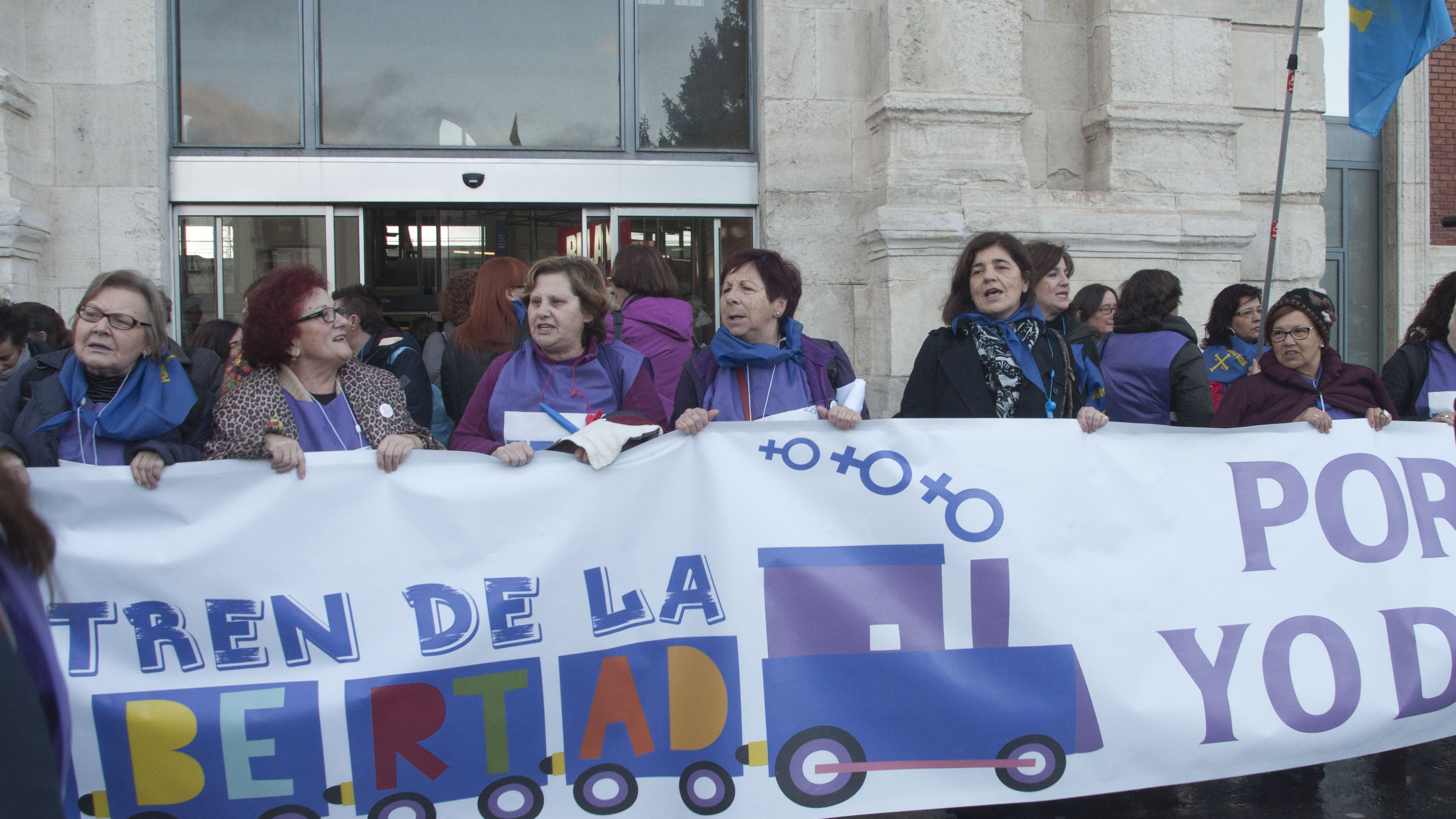
- "Tren de la libertad" in Valladolid
- Native name: El tren de la libertad
- English name: Liberty Train
- Date: February 1, 2014
- Duration: 1 day
- Venue: Atocha train station, Congreso de los Diputados
- Location: Gijón and Madrid; 40°24′57″N 3°41′48″W
- Cause: abortion rights
- Organised by: Tertulia Feminista Les Comadres, Mujeres por la Igualdad de Barredos

Reading of the manifesto "Because I decide" in the Assembly of the Train of Freedom on 1 February 2014

Women took to the streets to protest the announcement by Partido Popular's Minister of Justice Alberto Ruiz-Gallardón of his intention to change Spain's abortion laws. Gallardón's proposal would have limited women's freedom to obtain a legal abortion. The proposed changes would have allowed abortion only in cases involving pregnancy as a result of rape or when the physical or mental health of the mother was in danger. It would have done away with the part of the law that allowed women to have abortion for any reason in the first fourteen weeks of her pregnancy. Opponents to the law believed the existing law gave women autonomy and freedom of conscience. They characterized Gallardón's proposed modifications as "cynical" and "malevolent".

The Tren de la Libertad was a feminist initiative. Organizers included the Asturian feminist organization, Les Comadres. The actual train itself left from Gijón on 31 January 2014 arrived in Madrid on 1 February 2014 at 12am in Atocha. From there, protesters went to the Congreso de Diputados. The initiative was so popular among Spanish feminists that one train was not enough, and women had to seek alternative transport options to the protest. Many men and women came out to protest in Madrid and other cities in Spain to protest these proposed changes. This included convoys from Asturias, Andalusia, the Canary Islands, Catalonia, the Valencian Community, Castilla-La Mancha, Extremadura, Galicia, Murcia, the Basque Country and France. On social media, opponents to the changed used the hashtag #mibomboesmio. In taking to the streets, some women were beaten by the police, who reacted with violence to their protests against the law.

A manifesto by feminist philosopher and Les Comadres Feminist Tertulia member Alicia Miyares published by the collective sponsoring the train said in part, "Motherhood is protected in the following way: with information, with education, with health for all, and can access regulated training, employment, the economy, fair wages and decent jobs and positions of responsibility." Les Comrades spokesperson Begoña Piñero said of the planned march, "Women are free and we are ready to decide when we want to be a mother."

Gallardón's proposed changes turned into a political disaster for Partido Popular. Three years of debate aimed at appeasing conservatives within its ranks led to no actual changes in the law, while serving to energize both Spain's center and left aligned political parties. Prime Minister Mariano Rajoy eventually asked for and received Gallardón's resignation. Rajoy had miscalculated by allowing Gallardón to lead these efforts, choosing him over Minister of Health and Equality Ana Mato. Some within Partido Popular would later hint that Rajoy had set up Gallardón to fail in order to insure his own leadership would not be challenged by taking out a potential contender.

=== 7N (International Day for the Elimination of Violence against Women) ===
On 7 November 2015, Madrid hosted the first ever protest in the country against sexist violence. In 2018, women in forty different cities participated in marches against gender violence. The march saw women demand the abolition of prostitution that punishes the woman, and demanded that surrogacy not be made legal as it was little more than making wombs available for rent. The march took inspiration from the 8-M protest earlier in the year, and reminded people that 44 women had been killed by their partners so far that year. Protesters included young women, student groups, unions, pensioners and members of feminist collectives. Dressed in purple, women protested in Barcelona, Seville, Santiago, Zaragoza, Madrid, Bilbao, Mérida, Badajoz, Cáceres, Logroño, Las Palmas, Tenerife and Mallorca. In Madrid, protesters demanded the government live up to the promises of 2018 Pact Against Gender Violence that had been promised by the PSOE led government of Pedro Sanchez. They also demanded the Istanbul Convention (European agreement on gender violence) and the recommendations of the CEDAW (Convention on the Elimination of All Forms of Discrimination against Women) be implemented. Protesters condemned judicial sentences, with many chanting slogans or having signs in support of the La Manada victim. Surrogacy was also condemned the same way, with women saying, "the children are not bought, my belly is not rented." Forum of Madrid against Violence, President Lourdes Hernández explained some of the issues being protested, saying, "We have taken for the first time the issue that our body is not commodified, we do not want rent bellies, prostitution or pornography." Protester Marta Albarrán said, "We are against the existence of the women's market, prostitution. We are not a piece of meat that can be bought." Secretary of Equality of UGT Madrid Ana Sánchez said during the protest, "40 years ago, a Constitution was passed that in article 14 says that we are the same as men and it is a lie: men kill us, abuse us, commodify our bodies, sell our bellies. At work, being more prepared than men, we have it worse, worse contracts, lower wages." Lesbian feminists and Romani feminists were also attending the protest, insuring that their issues were not being erased. 12,000 women participated in the march in Seville. More than 2,000 women protested in Mallorca.

=== Diana Quer ===
Diana Quer was an 18-year-old from Madrid, visiting A Pobra do Caramiñal and attending the town's festival on 22 August 2016. On her way back to where she was staying with her family, she got lost and her mother reported her missing right away. Shortly after the news of her disappearance was released, feminists took again to the streets and went to the media to denounce the machismo nature of the alleged crime.

A protest took place in Madrid on 7 April 2018, starting at the Puerta del Sol at 11:00 AM, which from there went to Cibeles and then on to the Congreso de los Diputados. It was promoted by the sister of Diana Quer, Valeria Quer, who said, "I need your support, we are going to do it together. Because, from one day to the next my sister was murdered and as it happened to me, it can happen to anyone. Let's fight for a safer society. I need you." Valeria Quer would later join other protests, including in La Manada case, in support of judicial justice for victims of machismo and sexist violence.

Feminists in 2019 were fighting to see murders with victims like that of Diana Quer being counted by the state as gender violence; her murder was not counted as the man who committed it was a stranger. Feminists were highly critical of the media coverage of Diana Quer's murder, citing instances where the media focused more on the dress Quer wore, her behavior towards men in her life and her parents' divorce instead of on the brutal and gendered nature of her murder.

=== 8 de Marzo (International Women's Workers Day) ===
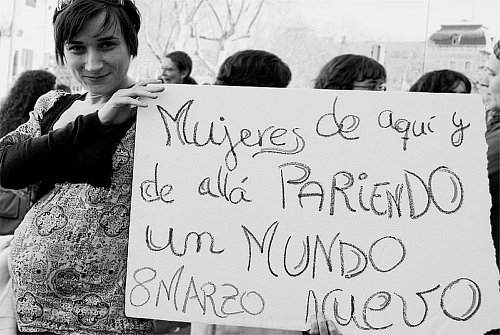
Feminist demonstrator at a protest in Madrid, Spain, 8 March 2009. International Women's Day.

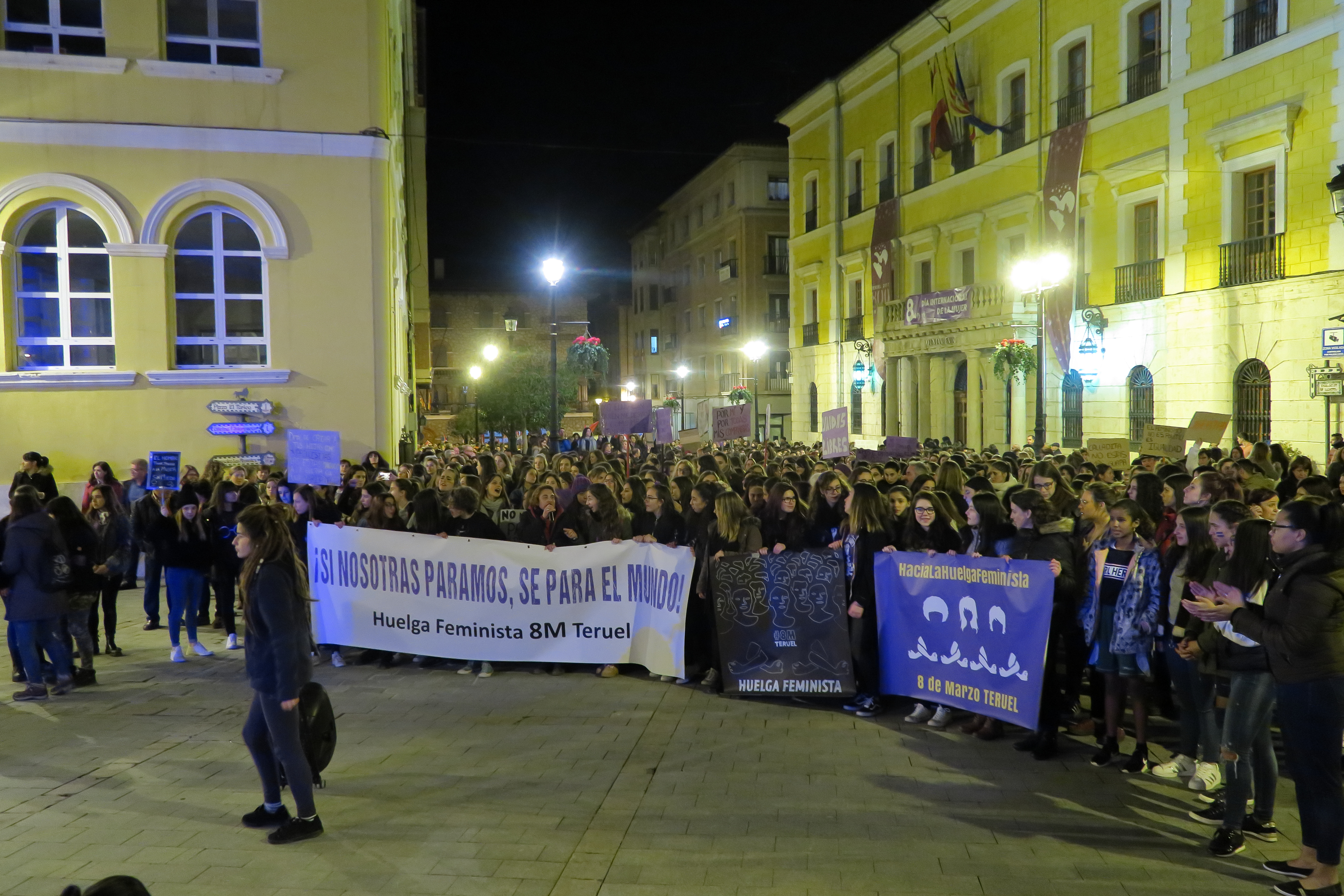
Día Internacional de la Mujer 2018. Protest in Teruel.

The fourth-wave became visible as a broader social movement because of 8 de Marzo, International Women's Day. The marches of International Women's Day have parallel internationally with things like the January 2017 Women's March in Washington DC against Donald Trump. According to Juana Gallego, co-director of the Observatori per la Igualtat (UAB), 8-M is an important tool to avoiding the fragmentation that defines the fourth-wave. It is an opportunity for all feminists to come together. The movement generally does not welcome men into their marches. This is because, according to Feminist Alde! member Anabel Sanz, "We do not need them to manifest ourselves. [...] we need them to share care, to confront everyday macho attitudes, to renounce their privileges." Political philosopher Jule Goikoetxea further explains, "it is necessary that there are non-mixed spaces", where "women, in this case, can empower themselves and organize themselves to become a subject political, as men are already." Ladies, Wine & Design coordinator Nerea Gómez explains, "Men who want to be feminists do not need to be given a space in feminism. They already have space in society and they can make it feminist." Gómez goes on to say, "it does not make sense for privileged sex to tell the subject sex how to free itself".

8 March 2018 marked an important milestone in Spanish fourth-wave feminism, even before the day itself occurred. Women across the whole of Spain went into public spaces and claimed them. While it did not effect immediate change, the day marked an important start of a slow process of change in Spanish society. #DíaInternacionalDeLaMujer is one of the primary hashtags used on the name. #AnaOrantes is another hashtags used by women on this day to draw attention to gender violence in Spain. Work stoppages have historically been an important tool for feminists. Fourth-wavers like Yolanda Besteiro look to examples such as the 1975 Iceland women's sit-down strike for inspiration. That strike demonstrated that women not working made their work visible. The goal of the 8-M strike was similar, to show that without women, the world stops.

On 8 March 2019, Spanish women held their second general strike as part of International Women's Day events. Women's actions in Spain in 2019 put them on the front page of not just Spanish newspapers, but newspapers and television programs around the world.

=== La Manada ===
Spanish feminist Marisa Soleto gives a presentation about sentencing for La Manada

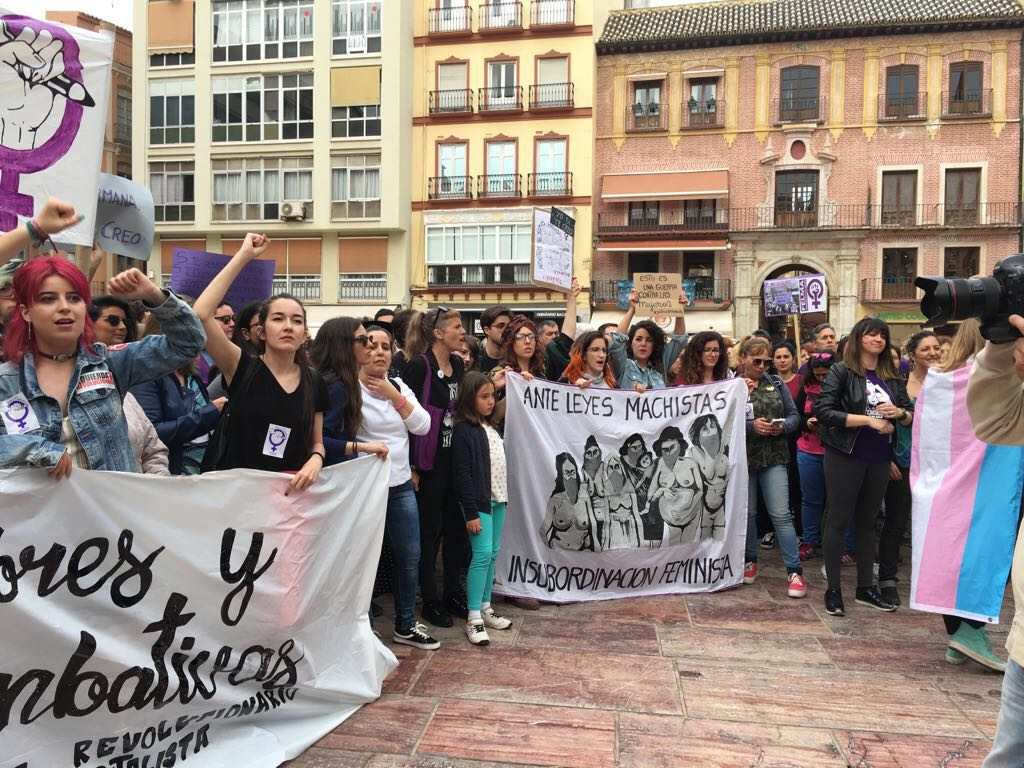
Plaza de la Constitución in Málaga with women protesting the sentencing of "La Manada"

La Manada (the wolf pack in English) was one of the most important events in Spanish fourth-wave feminism. #Yositecreo came out of this movement. It represented one of the highest crests of the wave, and took place in an international context alongside discussions like #metoo, #TimesUp and women's stories about Harvey Weinstein. They also intersect with broad Hispanic feminism and Argentina's #Miracomonosponemos. Feminist anger had been building in Spain over the treatment of women and sexist violence for a long time.

The La Manada case refers to an act where a group of men were accused of sexually abusing and raping a young woman from Madrid during San Fermin in Pamplona. The judiciary did not condemn the actions of the aggressors in the La Manada case as sexual assault, charging them instead with a much lighter sexual abuse offense. Despite a woman being violated multiple times by multiple men in a group, one judge had a different narrative upon which he built his own truth. In stating the men should be released as innocent, the judge said that he saw a woman who had sex with five men as doing nothing more than engaging in "sexual acts in an atmosphere of revelry and rejoicing." The judicial ruling on the case was published on 26 April 2018.

Several marches took place in Madrid to condemn the judiciary's handling of the case. They tended to follow a similar route of starting in Puerta del Sol, collecting people and then heading down Gran Vía towards the Ministry of Justice building on Calle San Bernardo.

Protests against La Manada took place in April 2018. One took place in front of the Ministry of Justice, with women chanting "out of court chauvinists" and condemning the patriarchal nature of the court ruling. The protest was organized by Sindicato de Estudiantes, and coincided with a student strike. Sindicato de Estudiantes spokesperson Ana García said during the protest, "The message has been very clear, and that is that the youth has mobilized against the patriarchal injustice that is the sentence of 'The Pack' and that the fight against machismo is not in Parliament or in the institutions but in the mobilization of thousands of women and young people." Valeria Quer held a sign that said, "My sister is not here because she is a victim of macho violence."

=== Judicial protests ===
One of the things that make this wave unique among feminist waves in Spain was that it represented the first time that women had mobilized to protest against and condemn the institutional sexism of Spain's judiciary. Previous waves had focused on being allowed into the political sphere. Feminists believed that many rulings by the courts had undermined their legitimacy as it related to the ability to protect women subjected to violence enacted upon them by men.

The social pressure brought by feminists against the judiciary resulted in 750 Spanish magistrates filing a complaint with the Consultative Council of European Judges. They felt the attitude in Spain, following the court's decision on the La Manada case, had led to a climate where they felt like they could be subject to public lynchings and where judicial independence was under threat.

== Social networks ==
Fourth-wave feminism utilizes a number of digital platforms including YouTube, Twitter, Instagram, Facebook and personal blogs. It was also utilized information technology. Social media plays a key role in awakening feminist interest and activism in Spain. A problem in fourth-wave feminism is the easy ability for feminists to engage in slacktivism. Collaboration and confronting the hypocrisy of individualistic feminism are important for negating slacktivism in Spain.

=== Twitter ===
Use of specific tags is viewed as important by the movements as it facilitates communication between activists. According to Isabel Mastrodoménico, hashtags are a "massive disembarkation is allowing us to know the mechanisms to start the change. [...] It is very important to make clear that they are joint communication mechanisms that have robbed us, you recognize yourself in the other person and you manifest together. Tags: Class consciousness exists until you erase it, gender awareness did not exist directly." Podemos Deputy Ángela Rodríguez explains the importance of hashtags as part of feminist institutions, "Among other things, because many times we live them as women in the first person, I have published tweets with all those hashtags without going any further." She goes on to say they help in setting legislative priorities, It is inevitable, we have as an absolute priority to finish our law of sexual liberties and against sexual violence, because much of what these hashtags speak is about impunity in these cases. [...] We celebrate the turn that in recent years has achieved the politicization of many women in the first person through networks and feminism, this is a revolution, a fifth feminist wave that has its first impulse in these hashtags and in Spain."

Popular Spanish feminist hashtags
Hashtag	Hashtag is about
#1000Motivos	International Working Women's Day strike.
#8DiasDeRevoltaFeminista	International Working Women's Day strike.
#8DiasDeRevuelta	International Working Women's Day strike.
#8M	International Working Women's Day.
#8M2019	2019 International Working Women's Day.
#8MhuelgaFeminista	Preparation for the International Working Women's Day general strike.
#AnaOrantes	Commemoration of the murder of Ana Orantes in December 1977 at the hands of her ex-husband.
#BastaDeFeminicidios	Denouncing sexist violence, specifically sexist murders of women.
#BastaDeViolencia	Denouncing sexist violence.
#BastaYa	Denounces sexist violence and demanding that it end.
#CifraDeLaVergüenza	The number of women murdered by sexist violence
#Cuéntalo	Tag to identify women who were working together to fight sexual assault and sexist violence. Promoted by Cristina Fallarás.
#DiaInternacionalDeLaMujer	International Working Women's Day.
#DianaQuer	Amplifying conversation about the case of Diana Quer and El Chicle, the kidnapping and murder of the young woman.
#ElChicle	Amplifying conversation about the case of Diana Quer and El Chicle, the kidnapping and murder of the young woman.
#Feminicidio	Murders of women as a result of sexist violence.
#Feminismo	General feminist related hashtag referencing feminism in many aspects.
#FolgaFeminista	International Working Women's Day strike in Galicia.
#GrebaFeminista	International Working Women's Day strike in the Basque Country.
#grebafeministarantz	International Working Women's Day strike in the Basque Country.
#HaciaLaHuelgaFeminista	Preparation for the International Working Women's Day general strike.
#HaySalida	Message of hope for victims of sexist violence.
#hermanayotecreo	Message to say people believed the woman who said she was raped by La Manada.
#HuelgaFeminista8M	Preparation for the International Working Women's Day general strike.
#LaManadaAndaSuelta	Message to say people believed the woman who said she was raped by La Manada.
#LasEstudiantesParamos	Preparation for the students' International Working Women's Day general strike.
#LasFeministasQueremos	Tag to identify women who were working together to fight sexual assault and sexist violence. Promoted by Isabel Mastrodoménico.
#M8GrebaFeminista	International Working Women's Day strike.
#MarchaDeMujeres	International Working Women's Day protests.
#mibomboesmio	Used to express opposition to Spain's new proposed abortion laws in 2014.
#MiVelloMisNormas	Stop pressure on women to cut trim their body hair. Promoted by Amatista.
#MujeresEnLucha	Acts of protest around International Working Women's Day.
#NiUnaMás	Denounces sexist violence and demanding that it end.
#NiUnaMenos	Global initiative to denounce sexist violence. Extended globally.
#NoEsNo	Response to judicial ruling in the La Manada case. No means no.
#NosotrasParamos	Preparation for the International Working Women's Day general strike.
#NosotrasParamos	Preparation for the women's only, non-mixed International Working Women's Day general strike.
#NoViolenciaContraLaMujer	Denouncing sexist violence.
#PorEllas	Support for women murdered by sexist violence
#SeAcabó	(Also #ShaAcabat, #Acabouse) Response to sexism and violence against the Spain women's national football team
#STOPMutilación	Campaign against female mutilation.
#TodosSomosEllas	Support for victims of sexist violence.
#VagaFeminista	Coordinating the assembly for the International Working Women's Day strike in Barcelona.
#ViolenciaDeGénero	Generally everything related to gender violence and sexism.
#VivasNosQueremos	Global initiative to denounce sexist violence. Extended globally.
#YoSiTeCreo	Response to judicial ruling in the La Manada case. I believe you.

==== Hashtag statistics ====
In just eight days, the #Cuéntalo tag was used 3.5 million times. This compares to 17.5 million uses of #MeToo over the course of a year.

Total tweets using selected hashtags by Spanish feminists on Twitter
Week	Hashtag	Tweets
7–14 December 2017	#NiUnaMenos	10232
7–14 December 2017	#AnaOrantes	2303
7–14 December 2017	#NoViolenciaContraLaMujer	160
14–21 December 2017	#NiUnaMenos	4255
14–21 December 2017	#CifraDeLaVergüenza	490
14–21 December 2017	#PorEllas	1158
28 December 2018 - 4 January 2018	#NiUnaMenos	6938
28 December 2018 - 4 January 2018	#BastaYa	3278
28 December 2018 - 4 January 2018	#NiUnaMás	5619
4–11 January 2018	#NiUnaMenos	9783
4–11 January 2018	#DianaQuer	8205
4–11 January 2018	#ElChicle	766
11–18 January 2018	#NiUnaMenos	7767
11–18 January 2018	#Feminismo	6097
11–18 January 2018	#ViolenciaDeGénero	3703
18–25 January 2018	#NiUnaMenos	9087
18–25 January 2018	#Feminicidios	1492
18–25 January 2018	#NiUnaMás	2868
25 January 2018 - 1 February 2018	#NiUnaMenos	9155
25 January 2018 - 1 February 2018	#MarchaDeMujeres	46
25 January 2018 - 1 February 2018	#MujeresEnLucha	37
1–8 February 2018	#NiUnaMenos	20970
1–8 February 2018	#BastaDeFeminicidios	5
1–8 February 2018	#BastaDeViolencia	597
8–15 February 2018	#NiUnaMenos	8626
8–15 February 2018	#TodosSomosEllas	1580
8–15 February 2018	#HaySalida	1269
15–22 February 2018	#NiUnaMenos	14146
15–22 February 2018	#HaciaLaHuelgaFeminista	10242
15–22 February 2018	#NosotrasParamos	4538
22 February - 1 March 2018	#NiUnaMenos	9595
22 February - 1 March 2018	#8MhuelgaFeminista	9218
1–8 March 2018	#NiUnaMenos	14845
1–8 March 2018	#HuelgaFeminista8M	4622
1–8 March 2018	#LasEstudiantesParamos8M	653
8–15 March 2018	#NiUnaMenos	34886
8–15 March 2018	#NosotrasParamos	26907
8–15 March 2018	#DiaInternacionalDeLaMujer	17672
