= María Julia Alcoba =

Uruguayan trade unionist and activist (born 1938)

- Alcoba in 2023
- Born: María Julia Alcoba Rossano; 7 November 1938 (age 87); Montevideo, Uruguay
- Occupations: Trade unionist, activist
- Political party: Socialist Party of Uruguay
- Children: 3

María Julia Alcoba Rossano is a Uruguayan trade unionist and activist.

== Biography ==
María Julia Alcoba Rossano was born in the Cerro neighborhood of Montevideo, Uruguay on 7 November 1938. She was the youngest of four sisters, and her parents were a laundress and a unionized dockworker. At age 12, she left school to work as a domestic worker. She began working at a textile factory when she was 13, inspired by older sisters. Soon after starting her job, she and her coworkers, largely other child laborers, launched a strike. During strike negotiations, the factory owner pointed a revolver at the strikers and closed the factory. She found a job at another textile factory and joined the Unión Obrera Textil (transl. Textile Workers' Union). She joined the Socialist Party at age 18, and later became a member of its Trade Union Commission.

In the 1950s, she co-founded the Congreso Obrero Textil (transl. Textile Workers' Congress) and joined the plenary of the Comisión Pro Central Única de Trabajadores (transl. Pro-United Workers' Federation Commission). Alcoba married in 1960; eventually having three children with her husband. She was an active organizer in the 1973 Uruguayan general strike.

In 1974, she exiled to Haedo, Argentina with her three children. In Haedo, she completed primary school and began secondary school, before she was forced into exile in Spain in March 1977. In Spain, she was active in the solidarity movement against the Uruguayan Dictatorship and in the feminist movement against gender-related violence. She also organized to legalize contraception and abortion in Spain. She served on the Barcelona committee of the Convención Nacional de Trabajadores (transl. National Workers' Convention, CNT) in exile and was active in the Comisión de Mujeres Catalanas (transl. Catalan Women's Commission). In Spain, she worked as a domestic worker and bookseller before obtaining a job as a health agent at the L'Hospitalet de Llobregat City Hall.

Alcoba returned to Montevideo, Uruguay in 1985. She obtained a degree in social psychology in 1992. In Montevideo, she co-founded the Instituto Mujer y Sociedad (transl. Institute for Women and Society). She authored Las mujeres, ¿dónde estaban? (transl. Where were the women?), a nonfiction collection on the history of women in the Uruguayan labor movement which was published in October 2014. An expanded reprint of the book was released in 2021.

As of 2026, she remains active in the labor movement.

== Bibliography ==
- Alcoba Rossano, María Julia (2014). Las mujeres, ¿dónde estaban? [Where were the women?]. Primero de Mayo, Universidad de la República.
