= Alicia Miyares Fernández =

Spanish researcher and activist (born 1963)

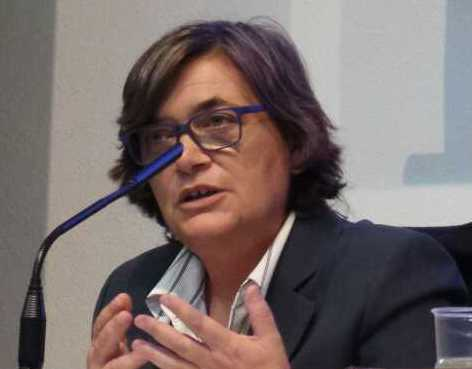
- Born: 30 April 1963 (age 63); Arriondas, Parres, Asturias. Spain
- Citizenship: Spain
- Education: Doctor of Philosophy; University of Oviedo
- Occupations: Philosopher; Writer; Professor
- Website: http://www.aliciamiyares.com/

Alicia Miyares Fernández (born 30 April 1963) is a Spanish philosopher, feminist, researcher, and women's rights activists. She has served as the spokesperson for several feminist organizations including anti-womb renting (Spanish: alquiler de vientres) No Somos Vasijas and Recav. She has been involved with the efforts to keep abortion legal, writing the manifesto for the 2014 Tren de la Libertad. Miyares Fernández was active in advocating feminist causes ahead of the 2019 Spanish general elections.

Miyares did her Philosophy Doctorate at the University of Oviedo on the presence of women in the Spanish government's elected roles. She is the head of the Philosophy Department and a professor at the Instituto Humanejos de Parla in Madrid. She has won several prizes for her work.

== Feminism and women's rights activism ==
Miyares Fernández is a Spanish philosopher, feminist, researcher, and women's rights activists. She is the president of No Somos Vasijas, an anti-womb renting feminist organization, which she helped found in 2015.

Miyares Fernández espouses a feminist philosophy that says, "the time for good words has ended." She has said, "Equality and Democracy should almost be the same thing, democracy without equality would not be real." She has also said "Spanish feminism is abolitionist". Her feminist beliefs include that women's bodies are not consumerist properties. Miyares Fernández has argued that the Spanish educational system has served to undermine women's rights by delaying equality.

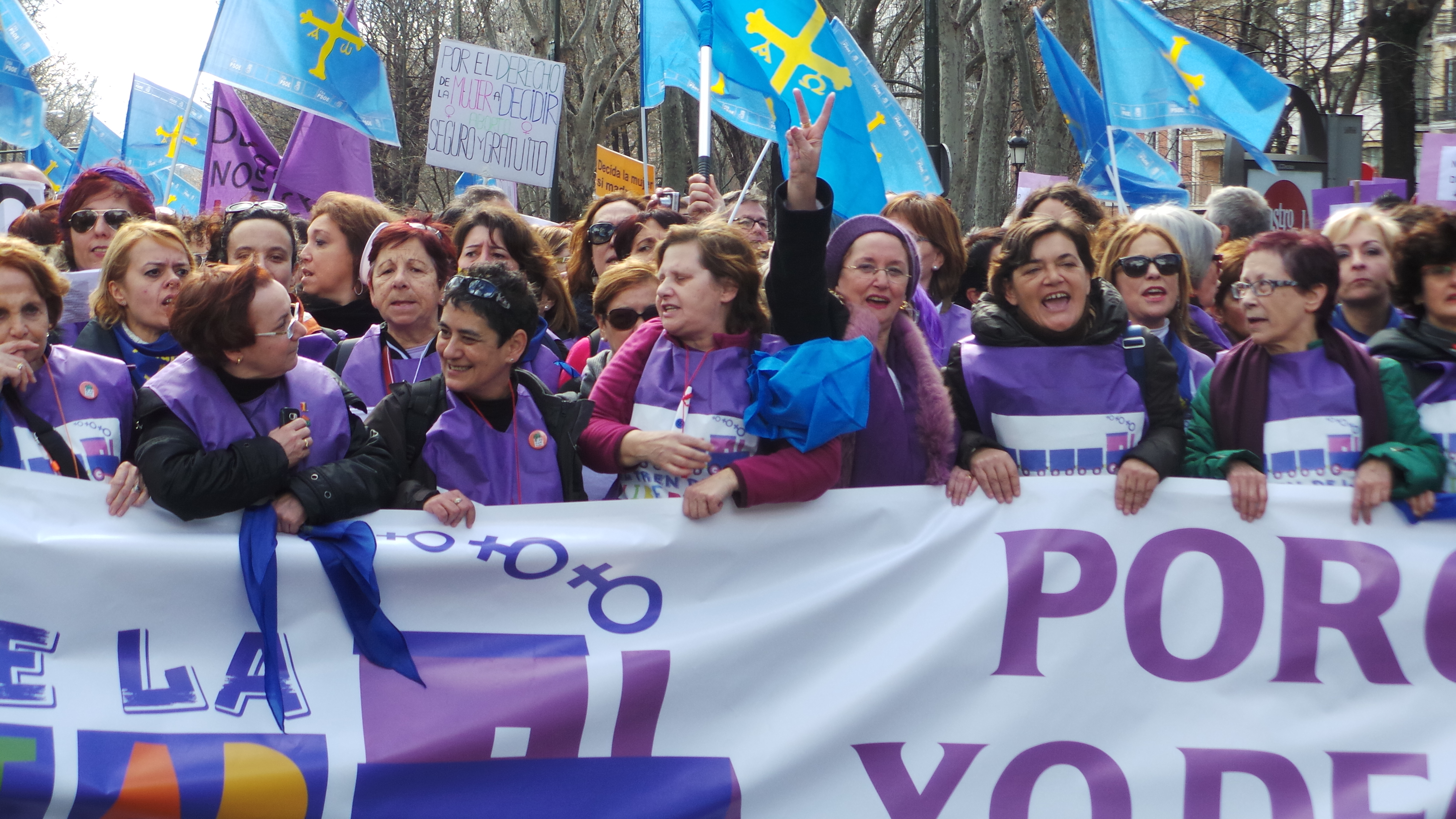
Alicia Miyares in the "El Tren de la Libertad" protest on 1 February 2014.

Miyares Fernández wrote the manifesto for the 2014 Tren de la Libertad. Her manifesto represented a milestone moment for Spanish feminism.

Fundación Atenea organized a conference about gender and inclusion in November 2016. Speakers included Alicia Miyares, Carlos Molina, María Pazos, María del Mar García Calvente, Soledad Muruaga, Lina Gálvez, Octavio Salazar, Beatriz Ranea and Pilar Foronda. In 2017, she participated in a debate about womb renting in Spain and was quoted by El País as saying, "I think one of the strongest desires of people is to be parents. There are real life dramas: women who do not have a uterus, who have suffered cancer, or the case of homosexual couples ... How can I not understand that frustration? But you can not put your desires above rights. The body is the limit of what can be bought and sold." (Spanish: Creo que uno de los deseos más fuertes de las personas es ser padres. Hay verdaderos dramas vitales: mujeres que no tienen útero, que han sufrido cáncer, o el caso de parejas homosexuales... ¿Cómo no voy a entender esa frustración? Pero no se pueden poner los deseos por encima de los derechos. El cuerpo es el límite de lo que se puede comprar y vender.)

In July 2018, Miyares Fernández participated in the 15th Feminist School Rosario de Acuña in Gijón. She talked about sexual harassment that women faced at the conferencing, saying, "I think that today they are not equivalent." When a woman says to one, "handsome!", She may be describing a physical reality That man is very handsome, when a man prays in that sense, he's saying something else, it's: 'If I want to, I appropriate your body.'" (Spanish: Creo que a día de hoy no son equivalentes. Cuando una mujer dice a uno, '¡guapo!', puede que esté describiendo una realidad física, ese hombre es muy guapo. Cuando un varón piropea en ese sentido, está diciendo algo más, es: 'si yo quiero, me apropio de tu cuerpo) In September 2018, thirty Spanish families were stuck in Kyiv, unable to repatriate children they had had using womb rental. As the spokesperson for No Somos Vasijas, Miyares Fernández spoke out against their efforts to return with these children, claiming that these families were attempting to commit a legal fraud.

In November 2018, Miyares Fernández participated in Vulnerable Maternities Day in Valencia. She participated as a spokesperson for No Somos Vasijas and Recav.

Ahead of the 2019 Spanish general elections, Miyares Fernández was very vocal about anti-womb renting (Spanish: vientres de alquiler) . On 9 April 2019, Miyares Fernández was part of a group of Spanish feminist women who published their prostitution abolitionist and anti-womb renting manifesto for feminist goals they wanted to see appear on party manifestos ahead of the 2019 general elections. That afternoon, attended the VI Jornadas Clara Campoamor de Fuenlabrada to further explain her feminist agenda ahead of the 2019 general elections.

== Education and career ==
Miyares Fernández did her Philosophy Doctorate at the University of Oviedo on the presence of women in the Spanish government's elected roles. Her thesis showed that quotes were good for ensuring that women are represented in Parliament, even among right leaning parties. As of 2012, she is the head of the Philosophy Department and a professor at the Instituto Humanejos de Parla in Madrid. Her research interests are around the repercussion of social, political and moral aspects of nineteenth century feminism and political philosophy.

The University of the Balearic Islands scheduled some conferences as part of their 2018 Summer University of Gender Studies. Miyares Fernández gave a presentation on fourth-wave feminism during the Summer University. She was scheduled to participate again in 2019.

Miyares Fernández has served as the Cabinet of the Ministry of Education and Culture for the Government of Asturias. She has also served as the technical adviser of the Equality Unit "Woman and Science" of the Ministry of Education and Science.

== Personal ==
Miyares Fernández was born in Les Arriondes in 1963.

== Prizes ==
- 2016: Prize Comadre de Oro especial, otorgado por la Tertulia Feminista Les Comadres.
- 2016: PrizeEscola de Pensament feminista "Amelia Valcárcel"
- 2018: Premio Feminista de Honor en la XXI Edición de los Premios Mujeres Progresistas 2018, otorgado por la Federación de Mujeres Progresistas.
