= Circle Surrogacy =

US-based surrogacy and egg donation agency

- Industry: Surrogacy, Third-party reproduction
- Founded: 1995
- Founder: John Weltman
- Headquarters: Boston, Massachusetts, United States
- Number of locations: 5
- Area served: Over 70 countries
- Parent: NorthStar Fertility Partners
- Website: circlesurrogacy.com

Circle Surrogacy is a US-based surrogacy agency headquartered in Boston, Massachusetts. Circle Surrogacy claims to carry an audited success rate for intended parents having a baby at 99.2%.

== History ==
Circle Surrogacy was founded in 1995 in Boston, Massachusetts. Prior to establishing the agency, founder John Weltman and his husband had children through surrogacy.

Circle Surrogacy's first baby was born to a heterosexual couple from Massachusetts. Circle Surrogacy provides services to both intended parents and surrogates, touting various financing options, support for international parents in over 70 countries, and a careful vetting and matching process, in which surrogate applicants participate in screenings with a social worker and complete psychological testing. In 2010, Circle moved its headquarters to the current location in downtown Boston. More recently, the agency has opened regional offices in several U.S. cities, including Washington, D.C., New York and the San Francisco Bay Area, as well as their first international office in London. As of 2019, Circle states that it has facilitated the birth of over 2000 babies via surrogacy and egg donation.

== Surrogacy services ==
Circle Surrogacy provides services for intended parents and gestational carriers from the application and screening process through post-birth. Circle Surrogacy also provides in-house legal and escrow services for its intended parent clients as part of the surrogacy programs the company provides. Pursuant to the Standards of Ethical Conduct for SEEDS Member Agencies, surrogacy agencies are advised to escrow client funds internally only in "limited circumstances," including, without limitation, that "[t]he Agency fully and conspicuously discloses the possible conflict to all Participants." The Academy of Adoption & Assisted Reproduction Attorneys has issued guidance that "[t]he use of a formal, independent escrow service is strongly recommended."

== Egg donation services ==
Beginning in 1995, Circle Surrogacy began to help people find egg donors for pure egg donation.

== Surrogacy.com ==
Circle launched Surrogacy.com on November 14, 2023, a community "for surrogates, by surrogates," and as information about the surrogacy process. Surrogacy.com recruits and matches prospective surrogates with surrogacy agencies. Surrogacy.com's parent company, Northstar Fertility Partners, owns and operates two surrogacy agencies, Circle Surrogacy and Growing Generations, and also operates a surrogate, egg, and sperm donor match making service, Donor Concierge. Surrogacy.com operates a member-only community for new surrogates, experienced surrogates, and their loved ones to share stories, advice, and ask and answer questions about surrogacy.

== Industry scope and historical review ==
Surrogacy is an arrangement, often supported by a legal agreement, whereby a woman agrees to bear a child for another person or persons, who will become the child's parent after birth. The surrogacy industry originally started as early as 1978, when the first baby was successfully conceived through an IVF transfer.

In 1980, an establishment for a “compensated-surrogacy” was concluded, reporting a successful transition, outlining an agreement between the two parties (traditional surrogate and the intended parents) rewarding a total of $10,000 to successfully carry and deliver a baby for the intended couples/parents.

Technological advancements led to increased surrogacy methodologies. The number of surrogacy agencies increased, providing surrogacy services for both females and males, regardless of their sexual preferences or orientation.

== See also ==
- Surrogacy
- Egg donation
- Surrogate marriage
- Sexual surrogate
- Surrogacy laws by country
- Third-party reproduction
