= El tren de la libertad =

Spanish social movement

The Freedom Train
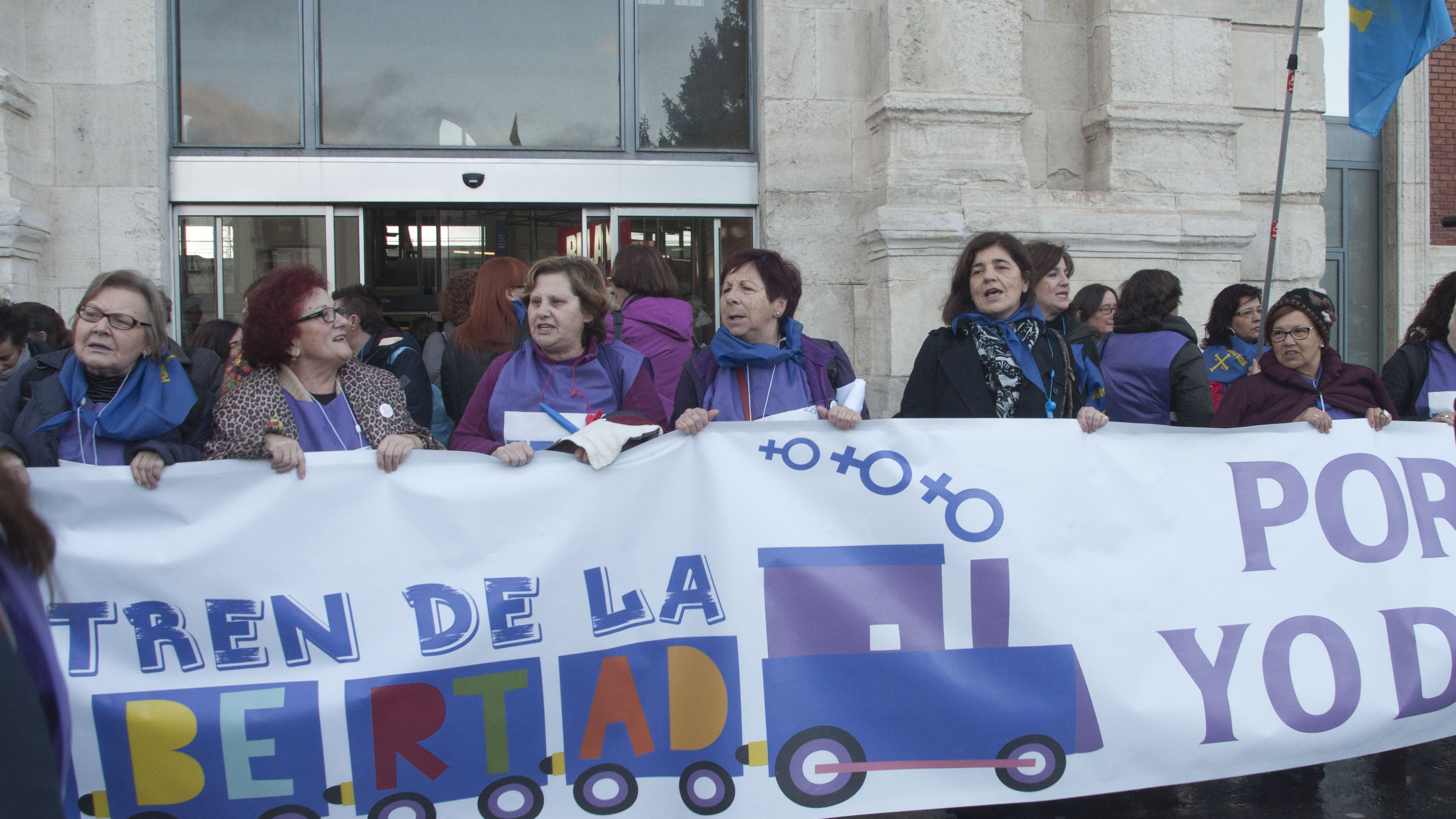
- "Tren de la libertad" in Valladolid
- Native name: El tren de la libertad
- English name: the freedom train
- Date: February 1, 2014
- Location: Madrid

El tren de la libertad (The Freedom Train in English) is a movement in defense of the sexual and reproductive rights of women. In late 2013, the conservative-led Spanish government proposed dramatically restricting access to abortion in the country.

== History ==
In 2010, the socialist government led by José Luis Rodríguez Zapatero reformed the Law of Abortion originally passed by the Congress of Deputies on December 19, 2009, which decriminalized abortion during the first fourteen weeks. The law was passed on July 5, 2010, replacing the Ley Orgánica 9/1985. The conservative Partido Popular filed an appeal with the Supreme Court in June 2010, and included the modification of the law as part of their 2011 electoral platform.

On February 1, 2014, the group hosted a massive demonstration in Madrid calling for the withdrawal of the preliminary draft of the abortion law presented by Justice Minister Alberto Ruíz Gallardón and demanding his resignation, as well as defending the existing law, which had been in use since 2010. The protest was an initiative that emerged in Asturias from the Feminist Tertulia Les Comadres and the organization Women for Equality of Barredos. It was joined by numerous women's organizations, feminist organizations, and entities involved in the fight for sexual and reproductive rights throughout Spain, which chartered trains and buses to bring participants to the central event of the Madrid Summit. The event was also supported by opposition parties and unions. The demonstration began at Paseo del Prado and traveled all the way to the Congress of Deputies, where a group of feminist representatives presented the manifesto "Because I decide" — written by Alicia Miyares, a respected philosopher and feminist writer, and detailing the demands of the marchers - to the Registration of the Congress in the name of the President of the Government, the Congress, the Minister of Health, Ana Mato, and the Minister of Justice, Alberto Ruiz Gallardón.

Tens of thousands of people participated in the mobilization of the Freedom Train. At the time it was considered the largest feminist protest in the history of Spain, a distinction it held until 2015.

Supporters of the effort also staged demonstrations in several European capitals (Edinburgh, Rome, Paris, Luxembourg) and Latin American (Buenos Aires).

The protest's growth and development was recorded in the documentary es:Yo decido. El tren de la libertad (in English: My Choice. The Freedom Train,I Decide: The Train of Freedom,Because it's my choice. The Freedom Train).Over 80 filmmakers and professionals from the audiovisual world participated in the project, including Gracia Querejeta, Ángeles González-Sinde, Mabel Lozano, Icíar Bollaín, Isabel Coixet, Georgina Cisquella and Virginia Yagüe.

As a consequence of The Freedom Train movement, the Spanish government had to abandon plans to tighten abortion law, ending months of speculation and prompting Alberto Ruiz-Gallardón, the justice minister and architect of the abortion proposal, to resign, charged with enacting some of the toughest legislation on the issue in Europe.

== "Because it's my choice" ==
"Because it's my choice" ("Porque yo decido" in Spanish) is a text written by feminist philosopher Alicia Miyares, given to Congress and dedicated to Prime Minister Mariano Rajoy, Minister of Justice Alberto Ruiz Gallardón, as well as Minister of Health Ana Mato.

== Protest march development ==
The route of the march was from Asturias to Madrid, and the people joined it from different Spain cities: Andalucia, Canarias, Catalonia, Valencian Community, Castilla-La Mancha, Extremadura, Galicia, Murcia and Pais Vasco. In the afternoon, they organized an assembly, where different delegation representatives attended the movement.

Several Europeans cities joined the march, including Paris, Rome, London, Luxembourg and Edinburgh. In Latin America, the participation of Buenos Aires was important.
