= Surrogate marriage =

The phrase "surrogate marriage" may refer to marriage as the result of widow inheritance or "woman-to-woman marriage" among certain African communities where a woman is infertile and her family substitutes another woman to bear children for her. In Igbo culture of Nigeria, a practice known as "woman-to-woman marriage" allows a woman to marry another woman and become a "female-husband." This is a recognized social and cultural institution, primarily used to address the cultural significance of male children to carry on lineage continuity when a family lacks an heir.

The practice is rooted in the cultural context of inheritance and social dynamics. In that marriage, the emphasis is not on the same-sex romantic relationships between the women involved but rather on the role of the bride as a child-bearer for the female-husband's lineage. Woman-to-woman marriage allows women, who may be childless or have reached the end of their childbearing age, to fulfill their obligation to produce offspring for their family. Historically, woman-to-woman marriage evolved within the Igbo society as a means of addressing various factors, including the importance of children, patterns of inheritance, and economic considerations. The inheritance structure is such that children are primarily recognized through their cultural father, the female-husband who pays the bride price, rather than a biological father. This belief influences the concept of lineage and ownership within the marriage arrangement. Scholars have conducted extensive research on surrogate marriage, exploring its motivations, evolution, and contemporary significance. The practice has been documented among various African communities, and studies estimate that a significant percentage of African married women may be involved in woman-to-woman marriages.

However, this practice has sparked debates and confusion, particularly when viewed through the lens of Western cultural norms and perspectives on marriage. Scholars have examined the dynamics of woman-to-woman marriage, its motivations, and the complex power relationships inherent within this form of union. Additionally, it has been noted that the practice persists, in part, due to its relevance to inheritance, wealth, and economic considerations in the societies where it is practiced. In her insightful book, Daniela Bandelli provides a comprehensive exploration of surrogacy by examining it from a multitude of angles, including social, political, cultural, and medical perspectives. Drawing from an extensive review of existing literature and original fieldwork, Bandelli's work aims to equip readers with a nuanced understanding of the complex and evolving landscape of surrogacy.

The book delves into various dimensions of surrogacy, presenting an enlightening chapter that outlines key aspects of the surrogacy process, its transnational market, and the medical risks associated with surrogate pregnancies. Moreover, Bandelli's analysis extends to the crucial role of women's movements in shaping public discourse and policy development concerning sexuality, procreation, and bioethics. Unlike conventional marriages that typically center on romantic love and companionship, woman-to-woman marriages prioritize the production of offspring, particularly male children, as a fundamental objective. The surrogate wife plays a critical role in this arrangement, contributing to the lineage by bearing children for the female-husband's family. The practice challenges traditional notions of marriage, family, and parenthood, emphasizing the importance of lineage and inheritance.

== Woman-to-woman Marriages in the Zulu Culture ==
Woman-to-woman marriages exist in other African cultures, such as the Zulu culture.

The root of the arrangement is the belief that marriage is an arrangement for the continuity of life. Where the life of the family or clan cannot be continued due to infertility or death, the family of the wife can substitute a female to bear children for the husband on behalf of the wife.

== See also ==
- Levirate marriage
- Widow inheritance
- Sororate marriage
- The Handmaid's Tale
