= Murder of Ana Orantes =

Victim of Spanish gender violence

Ana Orantes
- Born: Ana Orantes Ruiz; February 6, 1937; Granada, Spain
- Died: December 17, 1997 (aged 60); Cúllar Vega, Spain
- Cause of death: Femicide
- Occupation: Housewife
- Spouse: José Parejo Avivar
- Children: 7

Ana Orantes Ruiz (February 6, 1937 – December 17, 1997) was a Spanish woman who was a victim of gender violence. After her testimony was shown on a television program, she was killed by her ex-husband, José Parejo Avivar, on December 17, 1997 at age 60. Her death provoked a national reckoning about gender violence, and as a consequence, legal protections against gender and domestic violence were added to the Criminal Code of Spain.

Parejo began abusing Orantes soon after they married, and the behavior intensified over the course of the next 40 years. Although she tried to escape and report her husband to the police, there were no laws to protect victims of domestic violence in Spain, nor in much of the rest of Europe. After years of trying, a divorce was finally granted in 1996.

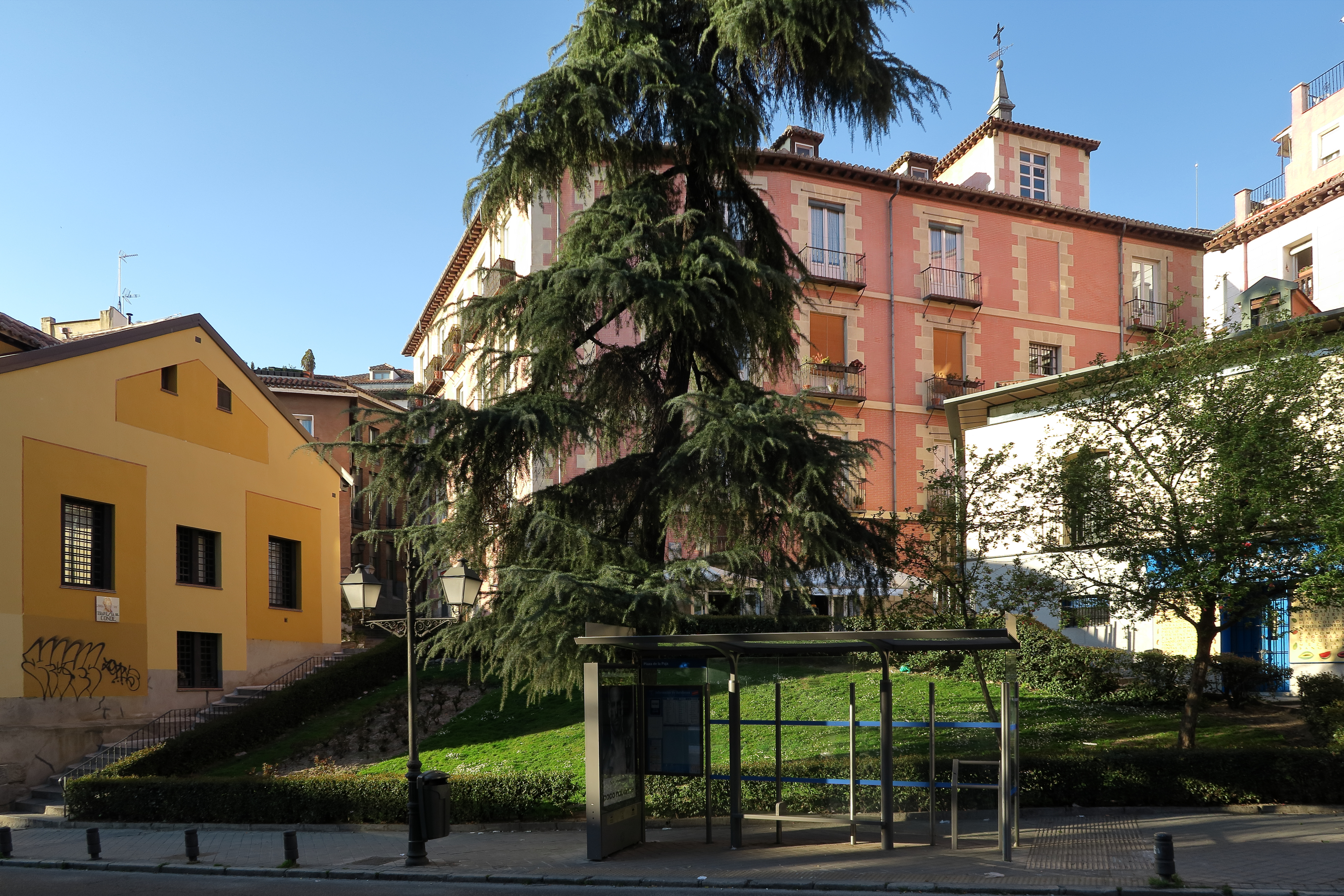
Garden of Ana Orantes in Madrid

On December 4, 1997, a year after the divorce, she appeared on the television program De Tarde en Tarde and described the violence and sexual abuse she and her children suffered over the course of her 40-year marriage. Instances of his physical and emotional abuse included punishing her if another man looked at her, isolating her from her family, forbidding her from attending the weddings of her siblings, inappropriately touching their young daughters and countless near-death beatings. She described how she went to the police dozens of times and attempted to obtain a divorce when it became legal in 1981, with no success. When one was finally granted in 1996, she was forced to continue occupying the same house as her husband.

Thirteen days after her interview, Orantes was found dead, murdered by her ex-husband, who had beaten her, tied her to a chair, and burned her alive. The gruesome nature of her murder, especially in such close proximity to her emotionally powerful interview, outraged the country and led to rallies across Spain to call for the protection of domestic violence victims. The conservative government dismissed these rallies, describing what happened to Orantes as an "isolated" event. To challenge this assertion, associations began documenting evidence and statistics about the prevalence of domestic violence. In 2004, Prime Minister José Luis Rodriguez Zapatero introduced Spain's first laws addressing domestic and gender violence. In the 2020s, the far-right Vox party has since increasingly pushed for the elimination of these laws, arguing they have no actual impact over domestic violence and the fact that punishment depends on the identity of the perpetrator rather than the nature of the crime.

Parejo was sentenced to 17 years in prison for the murder of his ex-wife. However, seven years after the murder, on November 17, 2004, José Parejo died at the Hospital Ruiz de Alda, in Granada, after suffering a heart attack in prison.

Orantes was the fifty-ninth identified victim of domestic abuse-related murder in Spain in 1997.

Orantes's sons also claimed to have been abused by Parejo.
