= Abortion in Francoist Spain and the transition period =

Abortion in Francoist Spain and the transition period was illegal. Francoists opposed abortion because it interfered with Spanish population growth. Abortion was only briefly legal in Spain in this period in Catalonia in the final days of the Spanish Civil War.

Abortion was formally made a crime against the state by Franco in January 1941, with criminal sentences, fines, and loss of rights for women, medical professionals who performed abortions, and pharmacists who provided drugs to facilitate abortions. The state made huge efforts to keep women ignorant about birth control and abortion. But many women still had abortions. Starting in the mid-1960s, feminists took up the cause of abortion rights. By the 1970s, women were going to England, Wales, the Netherlands, and North Africa for abortions.

Following the death of Franco in 1975, more serious discussions about legalizing abortion began to take place. The PSOE (PSOE) and the Communist Party of Spain (PCE) both tried to legalize abortion and divorce in the first draft of the 1978 Spanish Constitution. While a compromise related to divorce was reached, the Union of the Democratic Centre (UCD) and the People's Coalition both opposed it, and were able to insert language into the constitution that undermined future potential abortion rights. Abortion reform was finally passed in 1983, but did not become legal until 1985 as a result of constitutional objections by the Partido Popular (PP), or People's Party. The PP, along with anti-abortion activists, would continue to try to hinder legal abortion in Spain.

== Spanish abortion ideology ==
Hispanic eugenics and pronatalism were viewed as key components of addressing the decline in the Spanish birth rate and the need for an increased population size to serve the needs of the Spanish state during the Francoist period. Policies around this eugenics program involved bans on abortion, infanticide, contraception and information around contraception. This practice was started as policy during the Dictatorship of Primo de Rivera, discontinued by the Second Republic and then picked up again as a national level policy by Francoists. Anything that was viewed by the state as interfering with women's reproduction activities and increasing the size of the Spanish population were viewed as being in opposition to the state. All activities that stopped this were soon defined by the regime as crimes.

Eugenics in Spain in the late 1930s and through to the 1940s was not based on race, but instead on people's political alignment with the regime. Ricardo Campos stated, "The racial question during the Franco era is complex." He explained that "despite the similarities of the Franco regime with the Italian and German fascism and the interest that the eugenics provoked, the strong Catholicism of the regime prevented its defense of the eugenic policies that were practiced in Nazi Germany." He added: "It was very difficult to racialize the Spanish population biologically because of the mixture that had been produced historically." Vallejo-Nágera in his 1937 work, Eugenics of the Hispanicity and Regeneration of the Race defined Hispanicness around spirituality and religion. The goal was the "strengthening psychologically" of the phenotype. Because Catholicism was opposed to negative eugenics, the only way to fight the degradation was through repression of abortion, euthanasia and contraception.

Anarchist ideas about abortion in the early Francoist period were informed by opinions exemplified by Director of General Health and Social Assistance of the Generalitat of Catalonia Félix Martí Ibáñez during the Civil War, with a policy called "Eugenics Reform" that included support of abortion by removing it as a clandestine practice. Their policies also included support of working-class women, by attempting to give them economic relief so that elective abortions were not needed. During the Civil War, the only women's anti-fascist group to support the legalization of abortion was the Workers' Party of Marxist Unification (POUM). Mujeres Libres never mentioned abortion or contraception. Support of policies in favor of legalization were consequently largely made by leftist men. Women did not see abortion as part of a policy of women's liberation. Catalonia was the only area of Spain where abortion was legal, and this occurred only after the start of the war.

Doctors in Francoist Spain had two roles: to be moral protectors of Spanish reproduction and to provide science-based medical services. This put male doctors in charge of women's birth control. When medical doctors in the Second Republic and early Francoist period defended birth control, it was on the eugenics ground that it protected the health of both women and children, especially as it related to the spread of genetic disease and the spread of tuberculosis and sexually transmitted diseases.

== History of abortion ==
=== Francoist period (1939–1975) ===
On 24 January 1941, abortion was formally made a crime against the state by Franco. It had already been a crime based on the Código Penal de 1932. Doctors who performed abortions could be given prison sentences of between 6 years and 1 day to 14 years and 8 months, along with fines from 2,500 to 50,000 pesetas. Doctors lost their professional qualifications for 10 to 20 years. Pharmacists, or anyone in their employ, who gave any substance or medicine that were considered abortive could face the loss of their professional qualifications for 5 to 10 years, and fines of between 1,000 and 25,000 pesetas. Any doctor, midwife, or other medical practitioner who observed an abortion was required by law to report it to the authorities. Failure to do so would result in a fine. At the same time, any sale of materials used for the purpose of contraception or promoting their usage could lead to prison sentence from 1 month and 1 day to 2 months. Sex education was also banned, with punishments attached for teaching it. The criminal code was modified in the Código Penal de 1944, with an addition of criminal punishment for third parties giving a woman an abortion without her consent or unintentionally causing an abortion when being violent towards a pregnant woman. Both offenses resulted in minor prison terms.

The Franco government found an ally in their anti-abortion beliefs and practices in the Roman Catholic Church. Those within the Catholic Church wrote in support of the law, including Father Jaime Pujiula, Professor of the Colegio Máximo de San Ignacio de Sarriá and a member of the Royal Academy of Sciences of Madrid and the Barcelona Academy of Medicine. He stated: "The fruit that is lost criminally would perhaps be the most robust man, the healthiest, the most intelligent to contribute to society or to renew it or define new directions... It is also an attack on the population, on society, and on eugenics; not only the women having abortions, but the perverse midwives and doctors conspiring with them to perpetrate the crime for the vile spirit of profit, are responsible before God, before society, and before eugenics."

Women could, and did, go to prison for having abortions. During the 1940s in Almería, 9% of women in prison were convicted because they had abortions, had committed infanticide, or abandoned their children. This compared to 20.45% who were in prison for sexual offenses that mostly included prostitution, and 4.9% who were in prison for crimes against authority. The remaining prisoners were there for other offenses, like coercion, crimes against religion, possession of arms, or having a false identity.

As it was forbidden to discuss abortion in society, women were intentionally kept ignorant. Abortion, like women's sexuality, could only be discussed in a medical setting by male doctors. It could not be discussed in newspapers. During the 1940s in Aragon, there were almost no public references to abortion. The few references that did address it employed euphemisms. One example was in an article by Pedro Galán Bergua in Heraldo de Aragón on 1 January 1942: "The evil is not in those who marry, but in married couples who are happy to reduce their offspring and employ methods condemned by God and the country." Sources from newspapers from the 1940s controlled by the state or enjoying religious, medical, or legislative support give an impression that all women accepted the imposition of the state around the topic of abortion and the need to maintain the size of the population. Despite this, one estimate in 1943 by Matemólogo de la Sanidad Nacional Angel Clavero Núñez estimated one abortion for every three live births, concluding that 125,000 illegal abortions were performed every year. Abortions were generally only detected when a woman had a resulting health complication.

Working-class women who wanted abortions in the 1940s faced several burdens. In 1942, the average seamstress made 6.74 pesetas a day. The average female agricultural worker made 7.08 pesetas a day. This, coupled with the absence of an employed male partner, made it very difficult for them to hire midwives to help them with an abortion, as they were paid between 40 and 525 pesetas to attend births, and probably cost the same for performing abortions. Poor women with few options sometimes sought abortion by having someone hit them in the stomach. For the very desperate, they would give infants to the nuns or practice infanticide.

Between 1940 and 1950, 44 abortions were reported in the province of Zaragoza. Of these, 29 involved single women or widows. Judicial documents indicate many single women and widows had abortions to avoid the disgrace of having a child outside of marriage. Prostitution was quite common in Zaragoza in the 1940s, and was tolerated by the local government. Despite this, prostitutes were often charged with the "corruption of minors", and with having abortions, most of whom were minors themselves. Prostitutes were also the biggest population likely to be charged with engaging in birth control methods. Married women who had abortions tended to do so to limit the number of children that were in their family. Women in Zaragoza who were found guilty of having abortions tapped into a network to get assistance, with 38 of 44 cases involving help from other women, including mothers, sisters, neighbors, and friends. These women provided information, contacted the midwife, or went with the woman to the midwife. The abortions were performed using things like knitting needles, parsley stems, vaginal irritants, physical trauma, probes, mustard baths, or ingesting substances. Most of these methods were passed on to women via an oral tradition. Where their municipality could be identified, 21 came from the city of Zaragoza, while 15 came from more rural areas. This was despite efforts by the authorities to make it look as if the rural areas were more ideologically in agreement with it. In Luna, 10 women were found guilty of having abortions, in an extreme case of what appeared to be a coordinated effort to hide the existence of an under-age prostitution ring. Most of the girls were unable to sign their own names when brought in by the Guardia Civil.

As midwives appeared to be frequently involved in sharing knowledge about abortion and contraceptives, and in performing abortions, the male-led scientific community in Spain tried to marginalize these women. Professionalization in medicine would help to further relegate the importance of midwives in Spain. Further attempts to dislodge midwives from the birthing process included accusing them of witchcraft and quackery, trying to make them appear unscientific. This was all part of a medical and eugenic science-driven effort to reduce the number of abortions in Spain.

For women who had abortions in the 1940s, they did not appear to do so out of any conscious effort to subvert the regime's ideological position around the role of women; rather, these women were trying to protect themselves, their families, and their economic well-being by taking the only step available to them in the face of an unwanted pregnancy.

With the Código Penal de 1963, a new penal code was established in Spain, but the abortion laws were for the most part repeated verbatim from the 1941 version. There were minor modifications covering matters such as the fines given to doctors for conducting abortions, and for pharmacists who provided drugs to assist women having abortions. The Código Penal of 1973 is a copy-and-paste version of that from 1963.

Because abortion was illegal in Spain, during the 1970s, Spanish women who could afford to do so went to London to get abortions. In 1974, 2,863 Spanish women had abortions in London, and in 1975, there were 4,230. In the a four-month period in 1976, 2,726 Spanish women went to London for abortions. In 1979, there were 16,433; in 1981, 22,000. Between 1974 and 1988, 195,993 Spanish women traveled to England and Wales to get an abortion. Women also went to the Netherlands in this period to have abortions. France was not an option, as, at the time, it required women who had abortions to be French residents and have resided in the country for at least three months. Women then needed to wait a week to "reflect" before they could get an abortion. In addition, an unknown number of women went to North Africa and Portugal for abortions. During the mid-1970s, the Catholic Church preached that no physical barrier should be present during sex, and that even post-coital washes were problematic, as they interfered with the primary goal of sex being conception. The Catholic Church taught the only acceptable reproductive control methods were abstinence and the rhythm method. The Church tried to combat any efforts to change this practice.

Ahead of the "Year of the Woman", the government created eight commissions to investigate the status of Spanish women. The government used the findings of these commissions to produce two reports that were published in 1975. They were La situación de la mujer en España, and Memoria del Año Internacional de la Mujer. Among the findings were that the number of lesbians was increasing as a result of a number of factors, including "physical or congenital defects", the "affective traumas and unsatisfied desires", families being unable to prevent women's conversation, "Contagion and mimicry", and "... the lack of relationship with men as a consequence of an excessively rigid education, the existence of institutions that by their very nature eliminate these relationships: prisons, hospitals, psychiatric, religious communities, etc. ..., the media, tourism, alcohol, drugs, and the desire to search for new sensations, prostitution, and vice". To tackle the problem of the growing lesbian population, the government commission proposed solutions like "early diagnoses and medical treatments and psychotherapeutics that [corrected] possible somatic defects", creating a sex education program and the promotion of the idea that both genders can peacefully co-exist. In their reports, single motherhood was identified as a problem, though they noted it was in decline, which they attributed, in part, to the use of the pill and other contraceptives, and to women having abortions in other countries where the practice was legal.

=== Democratic transition period (1975–1986) ===
In the 1970s and 1980s, feminists were the only major group calling on the government to address the need for women to have access to abortion services. They played a critical role in changing public perception around abortion.

As a European Christian Democratic party, UCD opposed the legalization of divorce and abortion, believing in what they saw as "the preservation of the family". At the same time, PSOE and UCD supported legalization. Most of the independents in 1976-1977 were right wing, with the primary exception of Suárez who supported the legalization of divorce. Ahead of the 1977 elections, UCD did not put forth a coherent party policy on major social issues of the day in order to try to broaden their appeal among Spanish voters, who had largely been apolitical as a result of regime constraints on political activity. Their

primary goal in the 1977 elections was to create a break with the past and the dictatorship via reform. The Cortes of 1977 had to try to find a way to cope with the demands of the newly liberated left, who wanted to see reforms such as the legalization of abortion and divorce, while the Catholic Church opposed both. The last time the state had been in conflict with the Church was in 1931, with the founding of the Second Republic and no one wanted to see renewed political violence. In the first draft of the constitution, both PSOE and PCE supported the legalization of abortion and divorce. UCD supported the legalization of divorce, but at a later date, but opposed the legalization of abortion. Allianz Popular opposed the legalization of both abortion and divorce. A compromise was reached on divorce that would see the issue addressed in later legislation through the text of Article 32.2 which said, "the law will regulate the forms of matrimony... [and] the causes of separation and dissolution." No agreement could be reached over abortion, and Article 15 had the ambiguous text "todos tienan derecho a la vida" (all should have the right to life) at the insistence of UCD and Coalición Popular so the door could be left open to make abortion illegal. One of the reasons UCD went into decline after the 1977 elections was the party was forced to take positions on major issues of the day, including divorce, abortion and the use of public money for private schools.

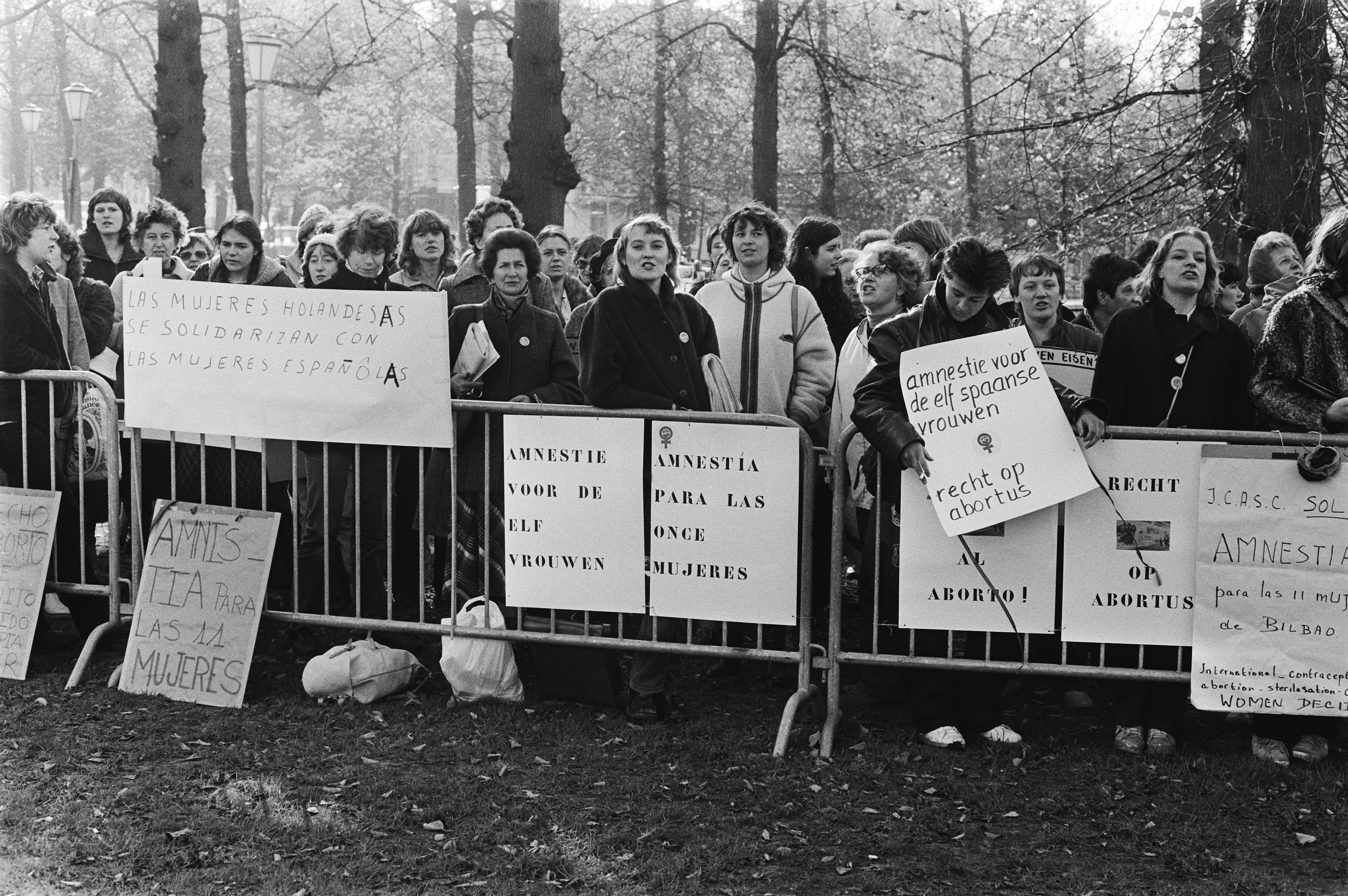
Dutch women in The Hague in 1979 demanding amnesty for the Bilbao women

The year 1979 was pivotal for abortion rights with the Bilbao Trial (Spanish: Juicio de Bilbao). It involved ten women and one man who were prosecuted for performing abortions. The prosecutors announced their intention to seek prison terms of more than 100 years. While trial was originally announced on 26 October 1979, as a result of several suspensions it was not held until 1982. It absolved nine of the women involved. A man who induced the abortions and a woman who performed them were found guilty. The ruling was appealed, but the appeal was suspended several times before being heard at the end of 1983. It resulted in four women being acquitted, while six women and the man were given prison sentences. In the end, those seven would eventually be pardoned by the state. Six of the women involved had serious health problems that would have made their pregnancies risky to their lives. The court later found that the therapeutic interventions to terminate their pregnancies were justified. A protest was held outside Barcelona's Palau de la Generalitat in 1982 in support of the Bilbao eleven. By that point, they had been in prison for six years. At least one woman had been denounced by her ex-husband. In addition to prison terms, prosecutors were seeking to strip the accused of their right to vote. At the protest in Barcelona, the police violently attacked protesters, inflicting head wounds on several of the women. An amnesty petition for the Bilbao 11 was signed by over 1,300 women, including politicians, singers, artists and journalists who all affirmed that they had also had abortions. All but those who performed the abortions were pardoned in 1982. As a consequence of the Bilbao cases, the Government stopped attempts to prosecute women who had illegal abortions.

In 1981, the Comisión Pro Derecho al aborto de Madrid produced a 39-page document detailing statistical information about abortion in Spain based on data from the Centro de Mujeres de Vallecas. It found that of the 820 women who had abortions, 68% were married, 3% were widowed and 29% were single. Of the 600 women on whom data were available, they found that 86.9% had their abortion before 12 weeks, that 72% had gone abroad despite limited financial resources to secure an abortion, and that 45.69% had an abortion for economic reasons.

Abortion remained illegal, eleven women being convicted of having abortions in 1982. One of these eleven received a prison sentence of ten years. The law did not change until 1985, when medically induced abortions were allowed if a mother's life was at risk, if the pregnancy was a result of rape (within the first 12 weeks), or if the fetus had a deformity (within the first 22 weeks). Criminal penalties still applied if abortions were provided outside these constraints, including one to three years imprisonment for doctors along with loss of license, and six months to a year in prison or a fine for women. 58,000 abortions would take place in Spain between 1987 and 1989.

PSOE introduced regulations to legalize abortion in 1983 through an amendment to Spain's penal code. Abortion was finally made legal by Congress later that year by a vote of 186 to 50, but did not enter into force until July 1985 as Coalición Popular (now Partido Popular) challenged its constitutionality. The decriminalization of abortion was allowed for three reasons. The first was that it was ethical in the case of rape, the second that it could be necessary to save the life of the mother, and the third was eugenic, in that it allowed abortion in case of fetal malformation. The three conditions allowing abortion were criticized, especially on the grounds of mental health of the mother as abortion opponents believed in practice it allowed abortion on demand, even though women were required by law to have a psychiatrist testify to their mental health issues before the procedure could be performed. Other countries were legalizing abortion at the same time. Italy made abortion legal in May 1981 as a result of a referendum, while in Portugal, abortion was legalized by the Parliament in November 1982.

Marí Carmen
La Mari Carmen quiere abortar
La Mari Carmen busca un hospital
A Mari Carmen le dicen que no
Ay Mari Carmen, tienes un marrón.

Mari Carmen, Mari Carmen
no te dejan decidir
lo que haces con tu cuerpo
ni cómo quieres vivir.
Marí Carmen
Mari Carmen wants to abort
Mari Carmen looks for a hospital
Mari Carmen is told that no
Ay Mari Carmen, you have a huge problem.

Mari Carmen, Mari Carmen
they do not let you decide
what you do with your body
nor how you want to live.

The abortion rate for Spanish women seeking the procedure abroad fell in 1984, the year before abortion was legalized. This was likely a result of an increased number of illegal abortions taking place in Spain in newly opened women's health clinics. In 1985, shortly before abortion became legal, Mari Carmen Talavera died in Madrid as the result of an illegal abortion. Her death led to several feminist and pro-legalized abortion chants.

Anti-abortion activists made it difficult for non-governmental family planning clinics to offer and perform legal abortions, as they harassed medical staff. The government also continued to occasionally prosecute medical professionals who performed abortions. Public universities often refused to teach medical students how to perform an abortion.

In 1985, Partido Popular tabled a proposed law that would have allowed doctors to express moral objections to performing abortions, even in cases when an abortion would have been legal. This law did not pass. Starting in 1986, health care centers that performed abortions were required to provide the Government with data regarding the total numbers of abortions they performed and demographic details of women seeking abortions. This was coupled with a law that required women to have two doctors sign off on the procedure before abortions could be performed.

Women from Gibraltar and Andorra would eventually come to Spain for abortions, as the procedure remained illegal and punishable with prison terms well into the 2000s.

== Statistics ==
Total abortions among Spanish women that took place in Spain, England and Wales, and the Netherlands
1974-1995	Spain		England and Wales		The Netherlands		Total		ref
Years	Number of abortions	Rate per 1000 reproductive aged women	Number	Rate	Number	Rate	Number	Rate	ref
1974	-	-	2,978	0.4	-	-	2,978	0.4	
1975	-	-	4,393	0.59	-	-	4,393	0.59	
1976	-	-	6,397	0.85	-	-	6,397	0.85	
1977	-	-	10,187	1.35	-	-	10,187	135	
1978	-	-	14,015	1.85	-	-	14,015	1.85	
1979	-	-	17,061	2.23	-	-	17,061	2.23	
1980	-	-	18,342	238	2,000	0.26	20,342	2.64	
1981	_	-	20,454	2.65	4,000	0.52	24,454	3.17	
1982	-	-	21,415	2.75	4,300	0.55	25,715	3.31	
1983	-	-	22,002	2.8	5,800	0.74	27,802	3.55	
1984	-	-	20,060	2.54	7,300	0.93	27,360	3.47	
1985	-	-	17,688	2.22	6,344	0.8	24,032	3.02	
1986	-	-	11,935	1.44	4,581	0.55	16,516	1.99	
1987	16,766	1.99	5,878	0.7	2,524	0.3	25,168	2.99	
1988	26,069	3.07	3,188	37	1,406	0.17	30,663	3.61	
1989	30,552	3.56	1,332	0.15	572	0.07	32,456	3.77	
1990	37,231	4.3	886	0.1	313	0.04	38,430	4.43	
1991	41,910	4.79	604	0.07	229	0.03	42,743	4.88	
1992	44,962	5.11	464	0.05	134	0.02	45,360	5.17	
1993	45,305	5.13	317	0.04	47	0.01	45,869	5.18	
1994	47,832	5.37	127	0.01	30	0	47,989	5.39	
1995	49,387	5.53	86	0.01	242	0.03	49,715	5.56	
total	340,214	-	199,809	-	39,822	-	579,845	-	
