= List of works by Chimamanda Ngozi Adichie =

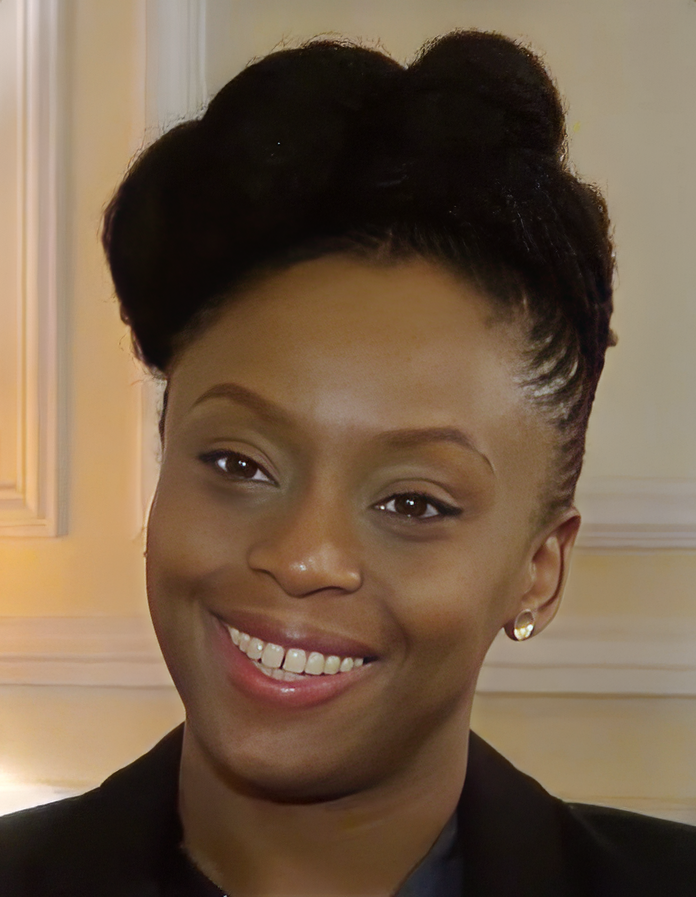
Chimamanda Ngozi Adichie is widely considered the 21st century successor of Nigerian writer Chinua Achebe, and one of the most esteemed writers of postcolonial feminist literature.

Chimamanda Ngozi Adichie (born 15 September 1977) is a Nigerian writer who won the 2007 Women's Prize for Fiction. She is best known for her novels, poems and short stories, which are often set in Nsukka, Enugu State, Nigeria, where she was raised.

By the age of 13, Adichie had started analysing stories by her father James Nwoye Adichie, including ones about Biafra. At 20, she made her debut as a published writer with the 1997 poetry collection Decisions, followed by a play, For the Love of Biafra, in 1998. She gained critical recognition with the release of her first novel Purple Hibiscus, published in the United States on 30 October 2003 by Algonquin Books. It took Adichie four years to research and write her second novel, Half of a Yellow Sun, published in 2006. She wrote Americanah, her third novel published in 2013 and Dream Count, her fourth novel published in 2025. She also wrote Mama's Sleeping Scarf, her first children's picture book published in 2023.

Adichie is a prolific writer of short stories, many of which were compiled in her collection The Thing Around Your Neck, published in 2009. She has written two book-length essays We Should All Be Feminists and Dear Ijeawele, or A Feminist Manifesto in Fifteen Suggestions. She has also written several short essays on topics ranging from postcolonialism to feminism.

Among the many accolades that Adichie has earned for her works are the National Book Critics Circle Award, MacArthur Fellowship, and induction into the American Academy of Arts and Sciences.

== Books ==
Play

- For Love of Biafra (1998). Ibadan: Spectrum Books, ISBN 978-9780290320

Novels

- Purple Hibiscus (2003). Chapel Hill: Algonquin Books; London: 4th Estate, 2004; Lagos: Farafina Books, 2004, ISBN 978-1616202415
- Half of a Yellow Sun (2006). London: 4th Estate; Lagos: Farafina Books; New York: Alfred A. Knopf, 2007, ISBN 978-1400044160
- Americanah (2013). London: 4th Estate; New York: Alfred A. Knopf; Lagos: Farafina Books, ISBN 978-0307455925
- Dream Count (2025). London: 4th Estate; New York: Random House, ISBN 978-0593802724

Book-length essays

- We Should All Be Feminists (2014). New York: Vintage Books; London: 4th Estate, ISBN 978-0008115272
- Dear Ijeawele, or A Feminist Manifesto in Fifteen Suggestions (2017). London: 4th Estate; New York: Alfred A. Knopf, ISBN 978-1524733131
- Notes on Grief (2021). London: 4th Estate; New York: Alfred A. Knopf, ISBN 978-0593320808

Children's book

- Mama's Sleeping Scarf (2023). New York: Alfred A. Knopf; London: HarperCollins Children's Books, ISBN 978-0593535578

Anthology

- Editor, The Best Short Stories 2021: The O. Henry Prize Winners (2021). New York: Anchor Books, ISBN 978-0593311257

== Poetry ==
Poetry collections

- Decisions (1997). London: Minerva Press, ISBN 978-1861064226

Poems

- "Sheer Beauty". Prime People
- "We dream" (September 1998). Poetry, pp. 3–9
- "Visiting Nigeria" (June 2001). Poetry
- "My Grandmother's Funeral" (2001). Allegheny Review, pp. 42–43

== Short fiction ==
Short story collection

- The Thing Around Your Neck (2009). London: 4th Estate; New York: Alfred A. Knopf; Lagos: Farafina Books, ISBN 978-0307455918

Short stories (ebook format)

- The Shivering (2016). Vintage Shorts, ISBN 978-0525431893
- Zikora (2020). Amazon Original Stories, ISBN 978-1542029612
- The Visit (2021). Amazon Original Stories, ISBN 978-1542032728

Short stories in journals and anthologies

- "You in America" (2001). Zoetrope: All-Story
- "The Scarf" (2002). Wasafiri, pp. 26–30
- "The American Embassy" (2002). Prism International, pp. 22–29
- "Half of a Yellow Sun" (2002). Literary Potpourri; published in 2003 in Zoetrope: All-Story, pp. 10–17; published in 2004 in The Best American Nonrequired Reading, edited by Dave Eggers, pp. 1–17; published in French as "Pâle était le soleil" (15 July 2004). Courrier International; published in Italian as "Mezzo sole giallo" (30 December 2004). Internazionale
- "My Mother, the Crazy African". In Posse Review: Multi-Ethnic Anthology; published in One World: A Global Anthology of Short Stories (2009), edited by Chris Brazier, pp. 53–60
- "New Husband" (2003). The Iowa Review, pp. 53–66; published in The Thing around Your Neck (2009), pp. 22–42
- "Women Here Drive Buses", in Proverbs for the People: Contemporary African-American Fiction, edited by Tracy Price-Thompson and TaRessa Stovall, pp. 1–7
- "Light Skin" (2003). Calyx, pp. 49–63
- "Transition to Glory" (30 September 2003). One Story; published in African Love Stories: An Anthology (2006), edited by Ama Ata Aidoo, pp. 34–49; published in All the Good Things around Us: An Anthology of African Short Stories (2016), edited by Ivor Agyeman-Duah
- "Lagos, Lagos" in Discovering Home: A selection of writings from the 2002 Caine Prize for African Writing (2003), edited by Binyavanga Wainaina, pp. 76–86
- "The Thing around Your Neck" (2004). Prospect, pp. 64–68
- "Recaptured Spirits" (2004). Notre Dame Review, pp. 47–58
- "A Private Experience" (2004). Virginia Quarterly Review, pp. 170–179
- "You in America" (2006); published in This Is Not Chick Lit by Elizabeth Merrick, pp. 3–13; published in Ms., pp. 64–70; published in The Thing around Your Neck (2009), pp. 115–127
- "The Scarf" (28 December 2008). The Observer, pp. 18; published in The Thing around Your Neck (2009), pp. 43–56; published in An African Quilt: 24 Modern African Stories (2013), edited by Barbara H. Solomon and W. Reginald Rampone Jr., pp. 27–39
- "The Grief of Strangers" (2004). Granta, pp. 65–81
- "Ghosts" (2004). Zoetrope: All Story, pp. 38–43; published in The Thing around Your Neck (2009), pp. 57–73
- "Do Butterflies Eat Ashes?" (2005). Fiction, pp. 3–17
- "The Master" (2005). Granta, pp. 17–41
- "Tomorrow is Too Far" (2006). Prospect, pp. 56–63; published in The Thing Around Your Neck (2009), pp. 187–197
- "The Time Story" (2006). Per Contra
- "Jumping Monkey Hill" (2006). Granta, pp. 161–176; published in The Thing around Your Neck (2009), pp. 95–114; published in The High Flier and Other Stories (2011), edited by Jairus Omuteche ISBN 978-9966258045
- "Cell One" (29 January 2007). The New Yorker, pp. 72–77; published in Best African American Fiction: 2009 (2009), edited by Gerald Early and E. Lynn Harris, pp. 61–73; published in The Thing Around Your Neck (2009), pp. 3–21
- "On Monday Last Week" (2007). Granta, pp. 31–48; published in The Thing around Your Neck (2009), pp. 74–94
- "My American Jon" (27 August 2007), in Binyavanga Wainaina: Me, My Writing and African Writers by Binyavanga Wainaina; published in Conjunctions, pp. 231–240; published in 2009 in The Mechanics' Institute Review, pp. 27–37; published in African Sexualities: A Reader (2011), edited by Sylvia Tamale, pp. 288–294
- "A Tampered Destiny" (29 December 2007). Financial Times
- "Emeka" in Four Letter Word: New Love Letters (2007), edited by Joshua Knelman and Rosalind Porter
- "Hair" (10 November 2007). The Guardian; published in 2008 in Ms., pp. 66–70
- "The Headstrong Historian" (23 June 2008). The New Yorker, pp. 68–75; published in The PEN/O. Henry Prize stories 2010 (2010), edited by Laura Furman; published in The Thing Around Your Neck (2009), pp. 198–218; published in Best African American fiction 2010 (2010), edited by Gerald Early and Nikki Giovanni, pp. 27–41; published in Who Knows Tomorrow, edited by Udo Kittelmann, Chika Okeke-Agulu and Britta Schmit; published in The Norton Anthology of World Literature (2018), edited by Martin Puchner
- "Chinasa" (27 January 2009). The Guardian; published in New Internationalist on 1 July 2009
- "Do" in Anonthology (2009)
- "Sola" (30 August 2009). The Sunday Times, pp. 60; published in Freedom: Short Stories Celebrating the Universal Declaration of Human Rights (2009), ISBN 978-0307588838
- "Quality Street" (1 February 2010). Guernica; published in New Statesman from 5–18 April 2010, pp. 36–39
- "Ceiling" (2010). Granta, pp. 65–80
- "Birdsong" (20 September 2010). The New Yorker, pp. 96–103; published in 20 Under 40: Stories (2010), edited by Deborah Treisman, pp. 1–19; published in Literature: A Portable Anthology, edited by Janet Gardner, pp. 434–445
- "The Arrangers of Marriage" in The Granta Book of the African Short Story (2011), edited by Helon Habila, pp. 1–17
- "New Husband" (2009), published in The Thing Around Your Neck, pp. 167–186
- "Checking Out" (18 March 2013). The New Yorker, pp. 66–73
- "Ofodile" (21 December 2013). The Guardian, pp. 46
- "The miraculous deliverance of Oga Jona" (18 July 2014). Scoop
- "The Shivering", published in The Thing Around Your Neck (2009), pp. 142–166; published in Africa: New Writing from Africa South of the Sahara (2014), edited by Ellah Wakatama Allfrey
- "Olikoye" (2015). Matter
- "Apollo" (13 April 2015). The New Yorker, pp. 64–69
- "The Arrangements" (3 July 2016). The New York Times
- "How Did You Feel About It?" (2017). Harper's Bazaar
- "Details" (2017). McSweeney's Quarterly, pp. 23–28
- "Janelle Asked to the Bedroom" (20 October 2017). The New York Times; published in Camouflage: Best of Contemporary Writing from Nigeria (2021), edited by Nduka Otiono and Diego Odoh Okenyodo, ISBN 978-9788033677
- "Chuka" (14–24 February 2025). The New Yorker

Essays published in newspapers, journals and magazines

- "Heart is where the Home was" (2003). Topic Magazine
- "Chasing American" (21 September 2004). Farafina
- "On sex, we are just buffoons: my response" (15 August 2004). Vanguard
- "The Line of No Return" (29 November 2004). The New York Times, p. A21; published as "The line of no return at the embassy" (30 November 2004). International Herald Tribune, p. 6
- "Nsukka in the eyes of a novelist" (3 January 2005). The Guardian; published in the P.S. section of Harper Perennial edition of Purple Hibiscus (2005), pp. 9–14
- "Blinded by God's business" (19 February 2005). The Guardian
- "Diary" (4 July 2005). New Statesman, p. 10
- "Blissful Sloth" (2005). Johns Hopkins Magazine
- "A Nigerian Book Tour in Australia" (2006). Farafina, pp. 3–5
- "Life During Wartime: Sierra Leone, 1997" (12 June 2006). The New Yorker, pp. 72–73
- "Buildings fall down, pensions aren't paid, politicians are murdered, riots are in the air ... and yet I love Nigeria" (8 August 2006). The Guardian, p. 5
- "The little boy who talked of magic" (19 August 2006). Time
- "Truth and Lies" (16 September 2006). The Guardian, p. 22
- "My college roommate expected me to be a she-Tarzan" (2006). Jane, pp. 126–127
- "Our Africa Lenses" (13 November 2006). The Washington Post, p. A21; published as "Adopting Africans not the answer" (14 November 2006). Newsday, p. 51; published in a shorter version as "My Africa lens clearly sees charity in sharp relief" (19 November 2006). St. Petersburg Times, p. 1
- "In the Shadow of Biafra" in the P.S. section of the Harper Perennial edition of Half of a Yellow Sun (2007), pp. 9–12
- "Shall I Live, Or Shall I Blog-Blah-Blah?" (1 April 2007). Hartford Courant
- "An der Klimafront: Schwarze Weihnachten" (11 April 2007). Neue Zürcher Zeitung
- "The exemplary chronicler of an African tragedy" (13 June 2007). The Guardian
- "The Writing Life" (17 June 2007). The Washington Post, p. 11
- "Kitchen Talk: Peppers" (2007). Brick, pp. 49–52
- "Real Food" (10 September 2007). The New Yorker, p. 92; published in Best African American Essays: 2009 (2009), edited by Debra Dickerson and Gerald Early, pp. 20–22
- "Operation" (2007). Granta, pp. 31–37; published as "To My One Love" (2008), in Utne Reader, pp. 84–86
- "An African Education in No Sweetness Here" (18 January 2008). NPR
- "Sex in the City" (2 February 2008). The Guardian, p. 3
- "Guest Editor's Note" (March–April 2008). Farafina, p. 3
- "Nigeria's immorality is about hypocrisy, not miniskirts" (2 April 2008). The Guardian, p. 32; published in The Hindu on 4 April 2008, p. 11; published in Leadership on 7 April 2008; published as "In Nigeria, miniskirts are a maximum issue" (4 April 2008). The Age
- "The Colour of an Awkward Conversation" (8 June 2008). The Washington Post, p. 7; published as "The color of an awkward conversation about race" (15 June 2008). The Dallas Morning News; published in Black in America: A Broadview Topics Reader (2018), edited by Jessica Edwards ISBN 978-1554814282
- "As a child, I thought my father invincible. I also thought him remote" (15 June 2008). The Observer
- "African Authenticity and the Biafran Experience" (2008). Transition Magazine, pp. 42–53
- "Strangely Personal" (2008). PEN America, pp. 34–37; published in Curse of the Black Gold: 50 Years of Oil in the Niger Delta (2008), edited by Michael Watts
- "Diary: The writer of Half of a Yellow Sun on the sour mood in Lagos, a reborn US and juicy plums" (28 March 2009). Times, p. 2; published as "Diary: the writer of Half a Yellow Sun on the joys of water for non-swimmers" (28 March 2009). Times
- "Diary" (11 July 2009). Financial Times, p. 2
- "My hero: Muhtar Bakare" (19 September 2009). The Guardian, p. 5
- "The Police, Our Friends" (30 September 2009). NEXT
- "Why do South Africans hate Nigerians?" (5 October 2009). The Guardian, p. 2
- "Father Chinedu" (2009). PEN America, pp. 91–93
- "Everywhere, moisture is greedily sucked up" (18 December 2009). The Guardian, p. 25; published as "The man who rediscovered Africa" (24 January 2010). Salon.com
- "What I see in the mirror" (23 January 2010). The Guardian Weekend, p. 43
- "Letter from Lagos" (2010). McSweeney's Quarterly, p. 1
- "Blood, oil and the banality of greed" (4 April 2010). NEXT
- "A new Nigerian-ness is infusing the nation" (10 May 2010). The Globe and Mail, p. 17
- "My favourite dress" (8 June 2010). The Guardian, p. 7
- "World Cup 2010: Nigeria, Ghana, Ivory Coast, Cameroon and South Africa – my boys" (11 June 2010). The Guardian, p. 2
- "Rereading: To Kill a Mockingbird by Harper Lee" (10 July 2010). The Guardian, p. 4; published as "Exposing America's social fault lines" (18 July 2010). Sunday Star-Times, p. 7
- "The Role of Literature in Modern Africa" (2010). New African, p. 96
- "A Street of Puzzles" (5 December 2010). The New York Times, p. 9; published as "Windows on the World" (26 December 2010). The Observer; published in Windows on the World: Fifty Writers, Fifty Views (2014) by Matteo Pericoli, pp. 16–18 ISBN 978-1101617113
- "Women of the Decade" (10 December 2010). Financial Times
- "A Nigerian revolution" (17 March 2011). The Guardian, p. 38
- "The Year's Biggest He Said, She Said" (26 December 2011 – 2 January 2012). Newsweek, pp. 42–43; published as "DSK Vs. The Maid: Who Would the Jury Have Believed?" (19 December 2011). The Daily Beast
- "No More Superpower?" (24 June 2011). The New York Times
- "Why Are You Here?" (15 January 2012). Guernica
- "A Country's Frustration, Fueled Overnight" (17 January 2012). The New York Times, p. 23
- "To Instruct and Delight: A Case For Realist Literature" (15 March 2012). The Commonwealth Foundation
- "My Uncle Mai" (19 May 2012). Financial Times, p. 26
- "Things Left Unsaid: review of There Was a Country: A Personal History of Biafra by Chinua Achebe (2012). London Review of Books, pp. 32–33
- "Chinua Achebe at 82: We Remember Differently" (23 November 2012). Premium Times; published in Chinua Achebe: Tributes and Reflections (2014), edited by Nana Ayebia Clarke and James Currey, pp. 90–96; published as "Awo Versus Achebe – We Remember Differently" (24 November 2012). Vanguard
- "Facts are stranger than fiction" (20 April 2013). The Guardian, p. 15; published as "Truth is no stranger to fiction" (10 May 2013). Mail & Guardian
- "The baby who never made it to Atlanta" (8 December 2013). The New York Times, p. 9; published as "A flight diversion" (6 December 2013). The New York Times
- "We have lost a star" (19 January 2014). Premium Times
- "Why can't he just be like everyone else?" (18 February 2014). The Scoop; republished on 19 February 2014 in NewswireNGR and The Daily Times
- "Why can't a smart woman love fashion?" (20 February 2014). Elle
- "Hiding From Our Past" (1 May 2014). The New Yorker
- "The President I Want" (4 May 2014). Scoop
- "Nigeria's brutal past haunts the present" (31 May 2014). The Daily Telegraph
- "I decided to call myself a Happy Feminist" (18 October 2014). The Guardian , p. 2
- "Lights out in Nigeria" (1 February 2015). The New York Times, p. 4
- "Democracy, Deferred" (10 February 2015). The Atlantic
- "On The Oba Of Lagos" (10 April 2015). Olisa.tv
- "Raised Catholic" (14 October 2015). The Atlantic
- "Why Chimamanda Ngozi Adichie Considers Her Sister a Firm Cushion at Her Back" (2016). Vanity Fair
- "Dear Ijeawele, or a Feminist Manifesto in Fifteen Suggestions" (12 October 2016). Facebook
- "To the First Lady, With Love" (17 October 2016). T: The New York Times Style Magazine
- "Nigeria's Failed Promises" (19 October 2016). The New York Times, p. 14
- "What Hillary Clinton's Fans Love About Her" (3 November 2016). The Atlantic
- "Now Is the Time to Talk About What We Are Actually Talking About" (2 December 2016). The New Yorker
- "Rereading Albert Speer's Inside the Third Reich" (1 August 2017). The New Yorker
- "Thank you for your patience" (2017). McSweeney's Quarterly
- "My Fashion Nationalism" (20 October 2017). Financial Times
- "Two Stories on Malaria" (25 April 2018). Evening Standard
- "The Carnage of the Cameroons" (16 September 2018). The New York Times, p. 10
- "Chimamanda Ngozi Adichie On Her Most Cherished Childhood Memories" (2018). British Vogue
- "Is There Anything Else I Can Help You with Today?" (28 January 2019). The Paris Review
- "Still Becoming: At Home in Lagos with Chimamanda Ngozi Adichie" (29 April 2019). Esquire; published in Of This Our Country: Acclaimed Nigerian Writers on the Home, Identity, and Culture They Know (2021), pp. 61–71
- "Shut Up and Write" (11–17 January 2019). New Statesman, pp. 38–43
- "Lean on me" (5 April 2020). Facebook
- "A prizewinning novelist, a bad concussion and loss of memory during the coronavirus pandemic" (7 August 2020). The Washington Post
- "Notes on Grief" (10 September 2020). The New Yorker
- "The address President Buhari could have given" (23 October 2020). The Nigerian Guardian
- "Nigeria is murdering its citizens" (25 October 2020). The New York Times, p. 2
- "Legacy of Hope: review of A Promised Land by Barack Obama" (29 November 2020). The New York Times, p. 1
- "Dreaming As a Single Family: A Reflection on the Holy Father's Encyclicals" (9 July 2021). L'Osservatore Romano , p. 8
- "Why "Literary Lion Wole Soyinka Is My Inspiration" (26 September 2021). Times
- "What hat das Recht, den anderen auszustellen?" (29 September 2021). Die Zeit, p. 57
- "I Have Never Been So Proud of My Fellow Nigerians" (28 February 2023). The New York Times
- "My Country Is in a Fragile Place" (28 February 2023). The New York Times; published on 9 March 2023 by Time Africa
- "Nigeria's Hollow Democracy" (6 April 2023). The Atlantic
- "How I Became Black in America" (12 May 2023). The Atlantic
- "Preface to Pope Francis" (2023), published in Hands off Africa! by Pope Francis
- "The Story of My First Love" (13 February 2025). Vogue

== Lectures and speeches ==
- "Allow Hope but Also Fear" (14 June 2009). Kalamazoo: Commencement Speech; published in The World Is Waiting for You: Graduation Speeches to Live By from Activists, Writers, and Visionaries (2015), edited by Tara Grove and Isabel Ostrer, pp. 91–98
- "The Danger of a Single Story" (2009)
- "To Instruct and Delight: A Case for Realist Literature" (2012)
- "We Should All Be Feminists" (2012)
- Eastern Connecticut State University Commencement Address (2015)
- Wellesley College Commencement Address (2015)
- Williams College Commencement Address (2017)

== Adaptations ==
- Quality Street (2011) by Maya Krishna Rao
- Half of a Yellow Sun, 2013 film directed by Biyi Bandele
- "Flawless", 2013 song by Beyoncé, includes excerpts from the talk "We Should All Be Feminists"
