= David Hundeyin =

Nigerian journalist, author

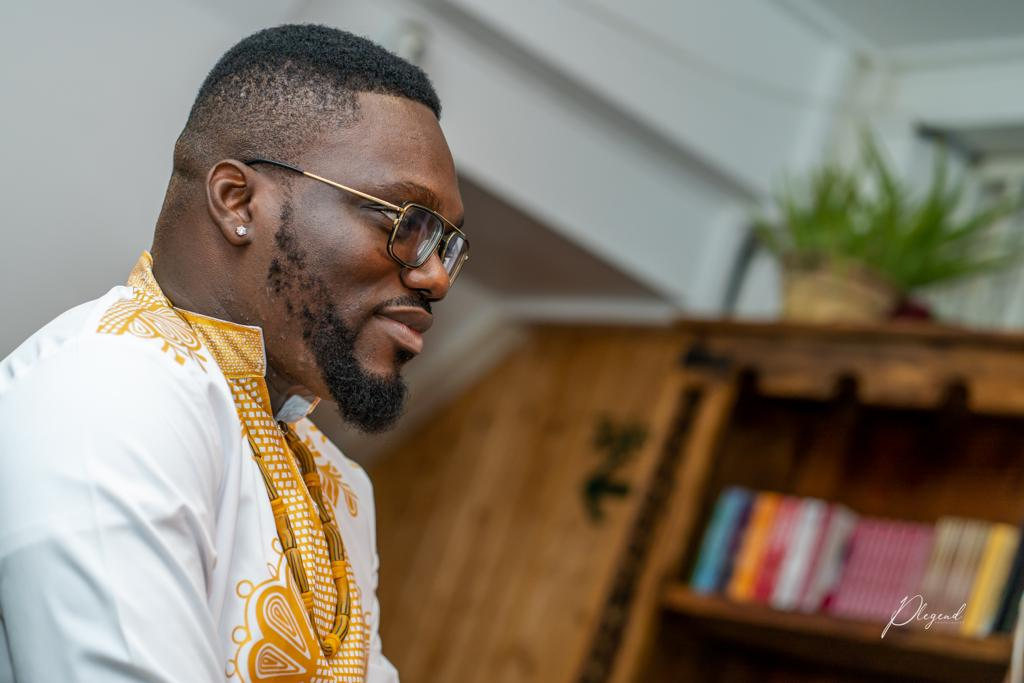
- Education: Igbinedion University; University of Hull
- Occupations: Journalist; Author
- Website: davidhundeyin.com

David Hundeyin is a Nigerian journalist and author. He founded West Africa Weekly, a Substack newsletter.

== Early life ==
Hundeyin initially studied mass communications at Igbinedion University before going overseas to study creative writing at the University of Hull and graduating in 2011. After working several jobs, including a contract position at KPMG, he returned home to Nigeria in 2013.

From 2017 to 2018, he was a writer for The Other News, Nigeria's first prime-time political-satire show, aired on Channels Television.

== Career ==
Hundeyin is an investigative journalist. His reporting style, at times open-sourced, has won him multiple awards but also earned him criticism. Chimamanda Ngozi Adichie has called him a "brilliant" investigative journalist. Omole Ibukun of Africa Is a Country wrote that Hundeyin "takes people's anger, turns it into dramatic battles, mixes in some contradictory political commitments, and then profits from the public watching it unfold".

=== NewswireNGR ===
In 2020, he wrote an article for NewswireNGR about Globacom and the work conditions and treatment of their Indian expatriate workers. After the story was published, the workers received their owed pay. Indian Prime Minister Narendra Modi wrote Hundeyin a letter of appreciation for his journalism.

He also wrote an investigative report about the potential human rights violations coming out of a proposed infectious diseases bill in Nigeria's house of representatives addressing the COVID-19 lockdown. This article won Hundeyin a People Journalism Prize for Africa.

In 2021, Hundeyin wrote about the rape and death of a 26-year-old woman. The article and several tweets by Hundeyin alleged that the suspect used a hotel owned by the wife of Nigerian politician Godswill Akpabio. Akpabio demanded a retraction from Hundeyin because he believed the publication gave the impression that he and his wife were complicit in the crime and threatened a lawsuit.

=== West Africa Weekly ===
Hundeyin received a grant from Substack Local to start the newsletter, West Africa Weekly, on its platform in 2021. He attributed this publishing change to the creative and editorial freedom it afforded him. He accused Globacom, a telecom company, of throttling access to the NewswireNGR site after his report came out and said that the website would always get cyberattacks after he writes a story. His newsletter would be delivered to his subscribers directly through email instead.

In 2022, Hundeyin published investigative articles on Nigerian presidential candidate Bola Tinubu, tech start-up Flutterwave, and the BBC's West Africa operations. The reports initiated intense social media conversations between Hundeyin and the subjects of his articles or their supporters. In an article about BBC's Sex for Grades documentary, Hundeyin had accused its director, Charlie Northcutt, of having an inappropriate sexual relationship with its reporter, Kiki Mordi. Northcutt sued Hundeyin for libel at the Royal Courts of Justice and obtained a default judgment for £95,000 in October 2024.

In April 2023, Hundeyin published Nigeria president-elect Tinubu's Guinean passport on Twitter which questioned his eligibility to become president. Hundeyin's Twitter account was locked for violating Twitter's policy on personal identifying information.

== James Currey Fellowship ==
In 2022, Hundeyin was announced as The Distinguished James Currey Fellow for 2023 as an academic visitor to the Centre of African Studies at The University of Cambridge after signing a publishing deal with the founder of the program, Onyeka Nwelue. In March 2023, Hundeyin was dismissed from Cambridge after an investigation into his conduct with Nwelue during his book launch at Oxford University. While Nwelue was accused of misrepresenting himself as an Oxford University professor, even though he was an unpaid academic visitor, Hundeyin was accused by attendees of the event of making misogynistic and sexist comments. On Twitter, he presented his fellowship as being awarded by Cambridge University, even though he was just an academic visitor under Nwelue's now discredited fellowship scheme. Hundeyin later accused Oxford professor Miles Larmer and Kaduna State Governor Nasir el-Rufai, an advisor to Oxford's African Studies Centre, of being behind the accusations and development.

== Personal life ==
After participating in the #EndSARS protest, Hundeyin left Nigeria in 2020 when multiple threats were made against him. He was granted asylum and refugee status in Ghana in 2022.

In September 2024, the Nigeria Police Force named Hundeyin as an accomplice of a whistleblower who was accused of leaking classified documents through the X account, @PIDOMNigeria. Hundeyin said his naming was an attempt to discredit his refugee status.

Hundeyin is a supporter of Peter Obi, who ran against Tinubu in the 2023 presidential election.

== Awards and recognition ==
- Royal Commonwealth Society "Write Around The World", Class B (14–15 years old) third prize (2006)
- People Journalism Prize for Africa, 2020
- GRC & Anti-Financial Crime Reporter of the Year (2021)
- James Currey Fellowship (2023)
- Association of Nigerian Authors Sir Chukwuemeka Sam Nwelue Non-Fiction Prize for Breaking Point (2025)
