= Death of Monic Karungi =

2022 death of a Ugandan influencer in the UAE

Monic Karungi (known online as Mona Kizz; 1997/1998 – May 2022) was a Ugandan social media personality who died after falling from a high-rise building in Dubai, United Arab Emirates. Dubai authorities classified her death as a suicide. Her case later gained significant public attention when it was cited in relation to the DubaiPortaPotty controversy and investigated by BBC Africa Eye as a potential case of human trafficking.

== Background ==
Karungi was a 24-year-old Ugandan national known on Instagram for her fashion and lifestyle content under the username "Mona Kizz." She had traveled to Dubai in early 2022, reportedly to seek modeling and promotional work.

== Death ==
In May 2022, a video circulated on social media showing a woman falling from a high-rise building in Dubai. Ugandan media later identified the woman as Monic Karungi. The authorities in the United Arab Emirates confirmed her death and officially recorded it as a suicide. No official evidence suggesting homicide or the involvement of a third party was released.

== BBC Africa Eye investigation ==
In 2025, BBC Africa Eye released a documentary titled Death in Dubai: #DubaiPortaPotty, produced by journalist Runako Celina. The documentary investigated potential links between Karungi's death and human-trafficking networks operating between Uganda and the UAE. As part of the BBC's World of Secrets series, the film used undercover reporting and interviews with survivors to examine recruitment practices targeting young East African women.

The investigation drew parallels to the 2021 death of another Ugandan woman, Kayla Birungi, in Dubai. It identified Charles "Abbey" Mwesigwa, a former London bus driver, as an alleged recruiter for these networks, and Umar Bashir as an individual accused of assisting women with forged travel documents. Both men denied the allegations, and as of 2025, no legal proceedings had been initiated against them.

== Reactions ==
The BBC documentary renewed public and advocacy group attention on labour migration and human trafficking from East Africa to Gulf states. In Uganda, organizations called for tighter regulation of recruitment agencies, better pre-departure awareness training for potential migrants, and stronger collaboration with Emirati authorities. Human rights groups urged international bodies like Interpol to assist in investigating regional trafficking networks.

While Karungi's death remains officially classified as a suicide with no judicial findings linking it directly to human trafficking, the documentary contributed to a broader public discussion about the vulnerabilities faced by migrant women working abroad.

== See also ==
- Human trafficking in the United Arab Emirates
