= Adejuwon Soyinka =

Nigerian journalist

- Education: law degree, Bachelor of Arts
- Occupation: Journalist

Adejuwon Soyinka is a Nigerian journalist.

== Education ==
Soyinka studied journalism at Nigerian Institute of Journalism, obtaining formal certifications in 1999. He obtained a law diploma in 2000 and a Bachelor of Arts in history and international relations in 2005 at Lagos State University.

== Journalism and governmental advisor ==
Before around 2015, Soyinka was Deputy General Editor of Tell Magazine, a member of its editorial board, and an editor of Tell's online version.

From around 2015 to June 2017, Soyinka was a media advisor to Ogun State governor Ibikunle Amosun.

In June 2017, Soyinka joined the BBC, where he and Ruona J. Meyer were investigative journalists for BBC Africa Eye. Their first documentary for the program, Sweet Sweet Codeine, involved secret filming of the way that the Nigerian pharmaceutical industry distributed codeine, a prescription-only opiate, via cough syrup. The documentary had a rapid impact, with a government ban being imposed the following day on producing or importing codeine cough syrup, a recall of 21 million bottles of the syrup, and arrests of key suspects.

As of August 2024, Soyinka was the West African Regional Editor of The Conversation Africa.

== Legal case ==
On 25 August 2024, the Nigerian State Security Service (SSS) detained Soyinka in response to a request from an unnamed government agency. Soyinka was released on bail after six hours in detention. The Conversation Africa described the arrest as harassment that would have a chilling effect on journalism and academia.
