= Onyeka Nwelue =

Nigerian filmmaker and author (born 1988)

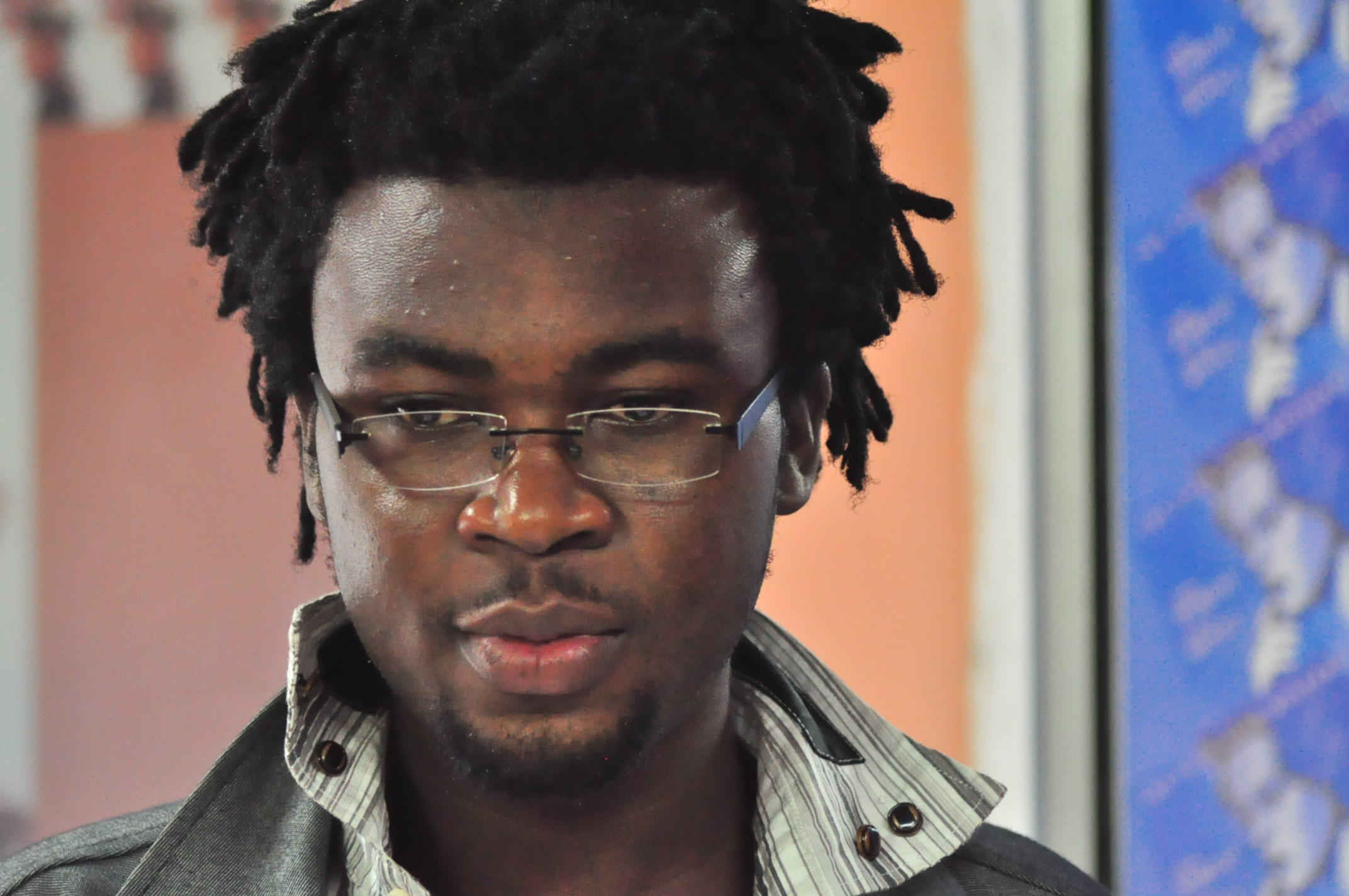
- Nwelue in 2011
- Born: Onyekachukwu George Nwelue; 31 January 1988 (age 38); Ezeoke Nsu, Imo State, Nigeria
- Occupations: Novelist; filmmaker; editor; poet
- Writing career
- Period: 2000–present

Onyeka Nwelue (born 31 January 1988) is a Nigerian author, filmmaker, publisher, and talk-show host. He has written over 40 books, including The Strangers of Braamfontein, which won a Crime Fiction Lovers Award and was described by Wole Soyinka as "raunchy". His book, Hip-Hop Is Only for Children, won Non-Fiction Writer of the Year at the 2015 Nigerian Writers Awards. He adapted his novella Island of Happiness into the Igbo-language film, Agwaetiti Obiụtọ. The film won Best Feature Film by a Director at the 2018 Newark International Film Festival and was nominated for Best First Feature Film by a Director at the Ousmane Sembene Award. The film received a nomination for Best Film in an African Language at the 2018 Africa Movie Academy Awards. Nwelue was involved in controversy over misrepresenting himself as a professor at the University of Oxford and University of Cambridge, and has gained notice for controversial views.

== Early life ==
Nwelue was born in Ezeoke Nsu, Imo State, Nigeria, son of Chukwuemeka Samuel Nwelue (1945–2022), who ran a motel and was a record shop owner, having been formerly employed at a construction company as a cashier and wages supervisor; he was later involved in local community politics. Nwelue's mother Catherine, née Ona, was a social scientist. He began writing and painting in primary school and led school drama and debating societies. He attended Umunohu Primary School and Mount Olives Seminary.

He studied Sociology and Anthropology at the University of Nigeria, Nsukka, but did not take a degree through "personal choice", before earning a scholarship to study Film Directing at the Prague Film School in the Czech Republic. Despite his connection with academic institutions, by his own admission Nwelue has no degree, calling it a "personal choice"; he took a diploma in scriptwriting from the Academy of Film & TV, India in 2013.

== Career ==
=== Writing and publishing ===
Nwelue has authored at least twenty-two books, twenty of which have been self-published or published through companies owned by him; the majority received no critical, nor public, attention.

Nwelue’s debut novel The Abyssinian Boy (2009) gained critical attention in Nigeria and India. His later works include Hip-Hop is Only for Children (Creative Non-Fiction Book of the Year, 2015), The Beginning of Everything Colourful, The Lagos Cuban Jazz Club, and The Nigerian Mafia series. In 2018, the Association of Nigerian Authors shortlisted The Beginning of Everything Colourful and The Lagos Cuban Jazz Club for their Annual Fiction Prize and Annual Poetry Prize respectively. In 2021, Nwelue was again shortlisted in both the categories, respectively for The Strangers of Braamfontein and An Angel on the Piano. His latest work titled The Nigerian Mafia: Mumbai is the first in a ten-book series set across ten countries.

In 2026, he published the novel Kito, a crime thriller chronicling murder and abuse. It's set to be adapted in 2027 by Nigerian screenwriter and director Collins C. Okoh.

=== Film and television ===
Nwelue's documentary House of Nwapa was shortlisted in the Best Documentary category at the 2017 Africa Movie Academy Awards. The next year, Nwelue adapted his novella Island of Happiness into an Igbo film, Agwaetiti Obiụtọ, which was shortlisted in the Best First Feature Film and Best Film in an African Language categories at the 2018 Africa Movie Academy Awards. He directed The Distant Light and documentaries on social themes including sex work (A Night with the Angels).

He also hosts The Onyeka Nwelue Show, a talk show featuring African creatives.

=== Teaching and scholarships ===
Nwelue has been a Visiting Research Fellow at Ohio University, a Visiting Assistant Professor at Manipur University, and a Visiting Lecturer of African Studies at the University of Hong Kong. He previously served as Research Associate at the University of Johannesburg. Nwelue does not hold any academic qualifications as he dropped out of University of Nigeria, Nsukka before the completion of his Bachelor degree.

=== James Currey Society ===
In 2021, Nwelue established the James Currey Society, an organization promoting research and recognition of British publisher James Currey. The Society organizes lectures, fellowships and awards, including the James Currey Prize for African Literature, first awarded in 2021 to Ani Kayode Somtochukwu.

=== Misrepresentation of academic position ===
Nwelue was an Academic Visitor at the African Studies Centre at the University of Oxford from 2021 until 2023. During this span, he claimed to be a professor at both Oxford and the University of Cambridge, even using their logos to market a range of commercial events; he also falsely claimed to be a Research Associate at SOAS University of London.

SOAS rejected Nwelue's claims outright, while both Oxford and Cambridge launched their respective investigations, upon which Nwelue's association was terminated for "persistent unacceptable breaches of its terms". It was clarified by both the universities that Academic Visitorship was not even a form of employment — neither the university remunerated Nwelue nor he had any responsibilities to the university. Journalists note that he was charged with £9000 by Cambridge for holding the position.

=== James Currey Fellowship ===
Nwelue also instituted a James Currey Fellowship, sometime in 2022, supposedly to sponsor African authors who wish to attend both Oxford and Cambridge; he claimed the fellowship to have been set up in collaboration with the University of Oxford. The fellowship awarded the James Currey Prize for African Literature to the best unpublished work of fiction in English from African authors eithers living in Africa or the diaspora.

The university denied any involvement with the fellowship. It was later reported to have been set up to benefit Nwelue's financial associates. Its two recipients were David Hundeyin, who had signed a book deal with Nwelue's publishing house a month before the conferral, and Mitterand Okorie, who had co-founded a literary agency with Nwelue and published multiple books with his publishing house including Nwelue's biography.

=== Views ===
During his time at Oxford, Nwelue posted racist, classist, and misogynistic content on Twitter, including about China being filthy and overpopulated, Arabs having a flair for slavery, Eastern Europe producing only pickpockets and scammers, poor people being of "no value", and African women who use wigs and makeup coming across as "masquerades". Nwelue apologized and described his tweets as "a social experiment to get feedback for an [upcoming] book."

In January 2023, he held a book launch by Nigerian blogger David Hundeyin, where students alleged both of them to have mocked the prevalence of sexual harassment in journalistic circles and suggested that women slept their way to the top.

=== Allegations of retracted AI-generated articles ===
In a September 2025 Washington Post investigation, Nwelue was linked to a series of retracted articles published at Business Insider and Wired under the name “Margaux Blanchard,” who used an address associated with a number of Nwelue's businesses. The articles all bore hallmarks of generative AI, including references to fictitious locations. When reached for comment, Nwelue told The Post in an email: "I haven't written any article for any platform. I am too busy. Don't mention my name in your stupid article." He responded to another duped editor with an expletive.

=== Allegations of scam and grift ===
In September 2026, an X (formerly Twitter) user accused him of obtaining money from him for a Japanese visa, which he believes has turned out to be a fraud. In the same post, another user questioned how Wole Soyinka would react to the allegation, given that Nwelue had claimed that his Japanese residency was obtained through the Nobel laureate. Lola Shoneyin, an author and daughter-in-law to Soyinka responded to the tweet, claiming that, based on inquiries, Soyinka had never written or signed a letter recommending him.

== Bibliography ==
- Kito (2026)

== Awards and recognition ==
  - Creative Non-Fiction Book of the Year — Nigerian Writers’ Awards (2015)
  - TM Aluko Prize for First Book — Abuja Writers’ Forum
  - Best Feature Film by a Director — Newark International Film Festival (2018)
  - ANA Prose Fiction Prize nomination — The Beginning of Everything Colourful (2018)
  - ANA Poetry Prize nomination — The Lagos Cuban Jazz Club (2018)

== See also ==
- List of Nigerian film producers
