= Foundation for Investigative Journalism =

Investigative journalism organisation

Foundation for Investigative Journalism (FIJ) is a Nigerian investigative journalism organization founded by Fisayo Soyombo in June 2020. FIJ reports on social justice, human rights abuse, and corruption in Nigeria. FIJ's online newspaper began operations on Wednesday, January. 20, 2021 with the publication of the extrajudicial killing of End SARS protesters at the Lekki tollgate area on October 20, 2020.

Published investigations by the FIJ have led to refunds by the police on extortion, refunds to customers by airlines and banks, and actions by the Nigerian Immigration Service.

== Detention of FIJ journalists ==
On December 13, 2021, Fisayo Soyombo was detained at the headquarters of the Nigeria Police Force (NPF) in Abuja in connection to a story published by FIJ about a police camp project approved in 2018 and scheduled to be completed in 14 weeks. FIJ reported that the then Commissioner of Police in charge of budget and finance approved more than N1billion for police transit camps projects in Benue, Bauchi, Plateau, Katsina, and Kano State. The report stated that after a visit to the project locations, little had been done three years later. He was released few hours later.

On August 31, 2023, Damilola Ayeni, a Nigerian journalist and editor of the FIJ was arrested and falsely tagged a Jihadist by the police in Benin Republic while he was investigating a story around the Pendjari National Park. 800,000 CFA was demanded for his release. He was released on September 9 after public outcry.

Similarly, on instruction of the Inspector-General of Police (IGP) Kayode Egbetokun, men of the NPF National Cybercrime Center (NCCC) abducted Daniel Ojukwu, a reporter with the FIJ. The police detained Daniel at the State Criminal Investigation Department (SCID) from May 1 to May 5, 2024, before transferring him to a cell in Abuja where he stayed until May 10. They denied him access to a lawyer and his family, and only released him after some media pressure.

== Investigations ==
S/N	Title	Date of Publication	URL
•	ARROWS OF GOD: One of Nigeria's Biggest Orphanages Is Trading Babies for Cash	August 10, 2023	
•	Undercover as a Smuggler	February 21, 2024	
•	UNDERCOVER: With N45,000, I Got Valid Police Character Certificate for Kirikiri Prison Inmate	July 17, 2024	

== Awards ==
- Google News Initiative Challenge

== See also ==
- 2020 Lekki shooting
- Our Impact
- Investigations
