= Fisayo Soyombo =

Nigerian Journalist

- Born: Olufisayo Babatunde Soyombo; October 27; Abeokuta, Ogun State, Nigeria
- Education: University of Ibadan (BSc)
- Occupation: Investigative journalist
- Years active: 2009–Present
- Organization: Foundation for Investigative Journalism (FIJ)
- Known for: Reporting
- Website: Fisayo Soyombo on X; https://fisayosoyombo.com/

Fisayo Soyombo (born October 27), is a Nigerian investigative journalist and founder of the Foundation for Investigative Journalism (FIJ). He was a former editor at The Cable. He is best known, among other things, for being the Nigerian undercover journalist who spent five days in a police cell as a suspect and eight as an inmate in Ikoyi Prison — to track corruption in Nigeria's criminal justice system, after which the authorities contemplated arresting him. He was also the journalist who drove the equivalent of a stolen vehicle from Abuja to Lagos, passing through a whopping 86 checkpoints in a journey of over 1,600 km that lasted a cumulative 28hours 17minutes.

== Early life and education ==
Soyombo, a native of Ago-Iwoye, Ogun State, was born in Abeokuta, the capital of the state, where he studied at Lawson's Childcare Nursery and Primary School, Labso Nursery and Primary School, and African Church Grammar School, Ita-Iyalode, Owu.

He spent a year at the Federal University of Agriculture, Alabata, Abeokuta (FUNAAB) in 2003, before proceeding to the University of Ibadan in 2004 to study agriculture, eventually graduating with a B. Agric. in Animal Science.

== Career ==
In his first year at the University of Ibadan, Soyombo became active in the campus press, joining both Mellanby Hall Press organization (MHPO) and the Union of Campus Journalists (UCJ). The UCJ was then led by Kola Tubosun as president. After winning five awards — two from UCJ, two from Mellamby Hall Press and one from Indy Hall Press, one of MHPO's biggest rivals — he was selected by the UCJ to intern at The Guardian, a Nigerian newspaper, at the end of the session.

At The Guardian, he was placed on the Sunday desk under the editorship of Jahman Anikulapo, with whom he would later develop a mentee-mentor relationship. In recent years, Soyombo has publicly cited Anikulapo several times as the first of his two mentors and "probably the biggest influence on my journalism career".

Soyombo had two more internship spells with The Guardian – in 2006 and 2009 – and also underwent his national youth service, for which he credits Mr. Anikulapo and Mr. Martins Oloja, the then Abuja bureau chief, with the paper.

At the end of the one-year service in February 2011 and with no permanent employment available at The Guardian, Soyombo very reluctantly left the paper for Content Watch, a pro-local content oil and gas magazine founded by Taijo Wonukabe, led by Taiwo Obe. From Content Watch, Soyombo moved to Jobmag, a human resource magazine briefly published by The JobMag Centre, and from there he joined The Will, from where he joined the defunct Flair Nigeria.

In April 2014, he joined The Cable, initially arriving as the founding news and feature editor before earning promotion within a month to become the founding editor. After leaving The Cable in January 2017, he joined the International Centre for Investigative Reporting (ICIR) as the editor, from where he joined Sahara Reporters as managing editor between May 2018 and June 2019. Although The Cable announced at its launch that it would be "strong in business and politics", Soyombo introduced investigative reporting to the platform, beginning with his December 2015 investigation into corruption at Nigeria's biggest seaport.

=== TheCable (April 2014 – January 2017) ===
Soyombo started as TheCable's first editor in April 2014. During this period, he disguised as a clearing agent to reveal the decay in the Nigerian Customs Service.

By the end of 2017, he left his position as the editor and started freelancing. However, he continued publishing his work on TheCable website.

He did an undercover report titled "With N46,000 bribe, I drove a 'stolen' car from Abuja to Lagos, and back!" published in May 2018 on the newspaper's website. Soyombo reported that over two days, he drove an equivalent of a stolen vehicle from Nigeria's capital, Abuja, to Lagos without being apprehended by the police, despite passing 86 checkpoints.

In 2019, he went undercover to reveal the rampant corruption in Nigeria's justice system, focusing on the police and the prison service. Soyombo spent days at the Pedro Police Station, Shomolu, Lagos, under the cover name "Ojo Olajumoke". He also spent eight days at the Ikoyi Prison in Lagos.

The Guardian then reported that there were plans by the Nigerian security forces to arrest Soyombo, forcing him to go into hiding for some time. The Nigerian Correctional Service (NCS) immediately denied making any attempt to arrest him.

This led to the birth of the Twitter hashtag #KeepFisayoSafe where journalists and other Nigerians demanded his protection from harm.

=== ICIR (2017–2018) ===
Soyombo had a short editorial stint at the International Centre for Investigative Reporting (ICIR). He did the investigative report titled "Filth, stench, bribery, corruption at Nigerian mortuaries and cemeteries" which revealed the poor state and corruption in mortuaries in the country.

=== Sahara Reporters (2018–2019) ===
In May 2018, Soyombo was announced as the managing editor of the online newspaper, Sahara Reporters. He left the newspaper after a year to continue working as a freelance investigative reporter.

=== Foundation for Investigative Journalism (FIJ) (2020–present) ===
In 2020, Soyombo founded the not-for-profit investigative journalism organisation FIJ.

=== Investigative works ===
In July 2019, one month after leaving SaharaReporters, Soyombo went under cover, spending two weeks in detention — five days in a police cell and eight as an inmate in Ikoyi Prison — to track corruption in Nigeria's criminal justice system. To experience the workings of the system in its raw state, Soyombo — adopting the pseudonym Ojo Olajumoke — feigned an offence for which he was arrested and detained in police custody, arraigned in court and eventually remanded in prison.

When the story was published in October, the government mulled arresting him — until Twitter campaign #KeepFisayoSafe forced back their hands.

The following month, Soyombo went under cover again, this time spending 10 days as a patient at the Federal Neuropsychiatric Hospital, Yaba, Lagos, colloquially known as 'Yaba Left'.

In January and February 2021, he published 'Portraits of Blood', the only attempt by any journalist to list the casualty toll from the bullets unleashed by the Army on protesters at the Lekki Toll Plaza on October 20, 2020.

His most impactful investigation till date is the five-part series 'Forgotten Soldiers', a hard-won exploration of the soldiers who got injured fighting Boko Haram on the battlefield but were abandoned by the Army and the government. After the story, Johnson Nwibani, a soldier who whose leg was amputated after he was shot by Boko Haram and had been begging the Army for a prosthesis for 44 months, eventually got a befitting prosthesis. Also, a number of soldiers who lost their hearing on the battlefield received hearing aids and were discharged from the hospital. Soyombo identifies the gifting of a befitting prosthesis to Nwibani as the "most fulfilling moment" of his journalism career.

== Major works ==
Fisayo Soyombo's notable investigative works
SN	Title	Date of Publication	Publisher	URL
1	Filth, stench, bribery, corruption at Nigerian mortuaries and cemeteries	June 5, 2017	ICIR	
2	With N46,000 bribe, I drove a 'stolen' car from Abuja to Lagos, and back!	May 31, 2018	TheCable	
3	Bribery, bail for sale... Lagos police station where innocent civilians are held and criminals are recycled	October 14, 2019	TheCable	
4	Bed-space corruption, terrible food, well-fed rats... Many things not right at 'Yaba Left'	June 22, 2020	TheCable	
5	PORTRAITS OF BLOOD (II): Names, photos, videos – how Lekki #EndSARS protesters were shot	January 26, 2021	TheCable	
6	ARROWS OF GOD: One of Nigeria's Biggest Orphanages Is Trading Babies for Cash	August 10, 2023	FIJ	[6]

== Controversy ==
On Thursday, June 18, 2020, Soyombo wrote on his verified Twitter account @fisayosoyombo that former Oyo State Governor, Abiola Ajimobi, had died. However, Ajimobi's family quickly debunked the claim, stating that the former governor was still on life support. Soyombo came under fire for refusing to recant tweets, instead he tweeted an update that his "trusted source insists the former governor is gone even though he still has not been disconnected from life support".

== Awards and recognition ==
In 2009, he made the longlist of the World Bank Annual Global Youth Essay Contest. In April 2022, Soyombo was named as a 2022 Fellow of the Reuters Institute for the Study of Journalism at the University of Oxford, United Kingdom where he will undertake research on "the rise of a willing army against the truth — the practice of drowning out a genuine work of journalism with coordinated media campaigns that confuse unsuspecting members of the public, consequently leaving the authenticity of the story in tatters".

Year	Award	Category	Result	Story
2021	One World Media Awards	International Journalist of the Year	Finalist	Portraits of Blood
2021	Karpoor Chandra Kulish International Award for Excellence in Journalism	Main	Honourable Mention	Undercover Investigation on Nigeria's Criminal Justice System
2020	Fetisov Journalism Award	Outstanding Investigation	Second Prize	Undercover Investigation on Nigeria's Criminal Justice System
2020	Kurt Schork Awards in International Journalism	Local Reporter	Winner	Undercover Investigation on Nigeria's Criminal Justice System
2020	West Africa Media Excellence Award	Investigative Reporting	Winner	Undercover Investigation on Nigeria's Criminal Justice System
2020	WJP Anthony Lewis Prize for Exceptional Rule of Law Journalism	Prize for Journalism	Honourable Mention	Undercover Investigation on Nigeria's Criminal Justice System
2020	One World Media Awards	International Journalist of the Year	Finalist	Undercover Investigation on Nigeria's Criminal Justice System
2020	People Journalism Prize for Africa	Main Award	Winner	Undercover Investigation on Nigeria's Criminal Justice System
2019	Diamond Award for Media Excellence (DAME)	Investigative Reporter of the Year	Winner	REPORTER'S DIARY: With N46,000 bribe, I drove a 'stolen' car from Abuja to Lagos, and back!
2017	Wole Soyinka Award for Investigative Reporting	Online	Winner	UNDERCOVER: In Borno, children are dying at IDP camps, foodstuffs are 'disappearing' at SEMA store
2016	African Media Initiative awards	Maritime Economy	Winner	Undercover Investigation: Nigeria's Customs of Corruption, Bribery and Forgery
2016	Wole Soyinka Award for Investigative Reporting	Online	Second Runner-Up	Undercover Investigation: Nigeria's Customs of Corruption, Bribery and Forgery
2016	Wole Soyinka Award for Investigative Reporting	Online	Winner	Forgotten Soldiers
	Wole Soyinka Award for Investigative Reporting	(The Nigerian Investigative Journalist of the Year)	Winner	Forgotten Soldiers
	Diamond Award for Media Excellence (DAME)	Investigative Reporter of the Year	2nd Runner-up	Undercover Investigation: Nigeria's Customs of Corruption, Bribery and Forgery
	Free Press Awards	Hans Verploeg Newcomer of the Year	Winner	Forgotten Soldiers
	PricewaterhouseCoopers (PwC) Journalism Excellence Awards	Journalist of the Year (Business and Economy Reporting)	Winner	Undercover Investigation: Nigeria's Customs of Corruption, Bribery and Forgery
