= Runako Celina =

British-Grenadian investigative journalist and documentary filmmaker

Runako Celina is a British-Grenadian and Jamaican investigative journalist and documentary filmmaker. She is known for reporting and producing BBC investigations, notably Racism for Sale (2022), a BBC Africa Eye documentary about a Chinese video-making industry exploiting African children, and Death in Dubai (2025), a BBC Eye and BBC World Service investigation into the death of Ugandan woman Monic Karungi and the exploitation of Ugandan women in Dubai.

== Career ==
Celina lived in China for seven years before returning to the United Kingdom in 2020. While in China, she co-founded Black Livity China, a media platform documenting the experiences of Africans and people of African descent in China and in relation to China.

In 2021, Celina graduated from City, University of London with an MA in Investigative Journalism and joined BBC Africa Eye.

In 2022, Celina and Malawian journalist Henry Mhango reported Racism for Sale for BBC Africa Eye. The documentary investigated personalised videos filmed in Malawi and circulated on Chinese social media, including videos in which African children were made to repeat racist phrases in Mandarin.

In 2025, Celina reported and produced Death in Dubai, a BBC Eye and BBC World Service investigation released as both a documentary and a season of the podcast World of Secrets.

== Accolades ==
Year	Award	Category	Show	Result	Ref.
2022	BBC News Awards	Rising Star	Racism For Sale	Nominated	
2023	One World Media	New Voice Award	Racism For Sale	Won	
2023	Grierson Awards	Best Documentary Presenter	Racism For Sale	Nominated	
2025	Edinburgh TV Awards	Visionary Live Pitch		Won	
2026	Amnesty Media Awards	Radio & Podcasts	World Of Secrets: Death In Dubai	Nominated	
2026	Royal Television Society Television Journalism Awards	Best Current Affairs programme	World Of Secrets: Death In Dubai	Won	
2026	Gracie Awards	Audio Podcast - News/Investigative	World Of Secrets: Death In Dubai	Won	
