= People Journalism Prize for Africa =

- Current: 2020 PJPA
- Awarded for: Public service journalism
- Country: Nigeria
- Presented by: Gatefield
- Reward: $3000
- First award: 2020

The People Journalism Prize for Africa (PJPA) is a public service journalism award that recognizes outstanding journalists and citizen reporters in Africa, whose work have resulted in positive change and impact in the society. PJPA was created in 2020 with an inaugural endowment of US $3000 from the founders, Gatefield, a sub-saharan Africa based public strategy and media group. The inaugural edition of the award was received by investigative journalists, Kiki Mordi and Fisayo Soyombo in February 2020.

== Inaugural event ==
The 2019 PJPA award was held in Abuja on February 20, 2020, World Social Justice Day, in line with the vision of the initiative, which is to defend social justice through promoting independent journalism and free media. The award ceremony had a lineup of speakers including the country heads of the UN Women, Open Society Initiative for West Africa among others. The UN took advantage of the event to advocate for the passage of the sexual harassment bill, while the first joint winner, Fisayo, announced the donation of his funds to a non-profit that champions criminal justice reforms. During the event, a social justice advocate, Segun Awosanya, was presented with the 2019 People Champion award.

== Judges ==
The winners of the PJPA award are judged by the following persons who serve on the board of the Gatefield Impact Foundation.

- Adewunmi Emoruwa, Lead Strategist at Gatefield
- Eromo Egbejule, award-winning journalist and Africa Editor, OZY.com
- Mercy Abang, an award-winning journalist
- Saadatu Hamu Aliyu, Curator at the World Economic Forums Abuja Global Shapers Hub

=== Recipients ===
Year	Recipient	Award Category
2021	Daneel Knoetze	People Journalist for Africa 2021
2021	Lucy Kassa	People Journalist for Informed Commentary 2021
2021	Debo Adedayo (Mr Macaroni)	People Newsmaker for Social Justice 2021
2020	Hopewell Chin'ono	People Journalist for Africa 2020
2020	David Hundeyin	People Journalist for Informed Commentary 2020
2020	Feminist Coalition	People Newsmaker for Social Justice 2020
2019	Fisayo Soyombo	People Journalist for Africa 2019
2019	Kiki Mordi	People Journalist for Africa 2019
