= Zikora =

2020 short story by Chimamanda Ngozi Adichie

- Short story by Chimamanda Ngozi Adichie
- Language: English
- Genre: Fiction

Publication
- Publication date: 27 October 2020
- Pages: 39

Chronology
"The Arrangements"	"Chuka"

"Zikora" is a short story (2020) written by Chimamanda Ngozi Adichie, Nigerian author of various other literary works, including Purple Hibiscus, Half of a Yellow Sun, and Americanah. "Zikora" is an engaging story about a woman who reflects on the current state of her life as she is about to have a baby without a spouse.

== Synopsis ==
"Zikora" is set in Washington D.C, United States of America, and features a 39-year-old Nigerian woman who works as a lawyer there. She is dating Kwame, a Ghanaian, who is also a lawyer and seems to be her perfect match, until she becomes pregnant and he decides to abandon her.

The story captures the thoughts of Zikora, who is in her final stages before giving birth, as she reflects on her cousin Mmiliaku in Nigeria, who is pregnant and already has five children, her mother who was left by her father to live with his second family, and the failure of a relationship she had back in college.

== Character ==
- Zikora is the major character.
- Kwame is Zikora's Partner.
- Mmiliaku is Zikora's Cousin.
