= Ruona J. Meyer =

Nigerian investigative journalist

- Born: Benin city
- Citizenship: Nigerian
- Education: BSc microbiology
- Alma mater: University of Nigeria
- Occupation: Investigative journalist

Ruona J. Meyer (1982), formerly called Ruona Agbroko and Ruona Agbroko-Meyer is a Nigerian investigative journalist. She was named Investigative Journalist of 2013 in Nigeria. Her work has been featured on the BBC, 234Next, Financial Times, Reuters, Daily Trust, This Day, and others. She is the first Nigerian journalist to be nominated for an International Emmy Award.

== Education and career ==
Meyer was born in Benin City, Nigeria in 1982, one of five children of Rachel and Godwin Agbroko. Godwin, a Nigerian journalist in Nigeria, was assassinated on December 22, 2006. He had, before his death, won awards for his work, including the PEN/Barbara Goldsmith Freedom to Write Award in 1997.

Meyer completed a postgraduate degree from Wits University in South Africa, from where she finished with a distinction. At the time, she also blogged for the journalism department. She had her undergraduate degree in microbiology from the University of Lagos, Nigeria. She is currently a PhD student at De Montfort University in Leicester (DMU).

Meyer's first byline was for the This Day newspaper in Lagos on June 12, 2003. From there, she has worked with journalists like Simon Kolawole, Paul Ibe, Ijeoma Nwogwugwu, Kadaria Ahmed, and Dele Olojede, who ran the now-defunct 234Next newspaper.

== Major works and awards ==
- Sweet, Sweet Codeine (2018) for BBC Africa Eye, Nigeria.
- Shale gas stirs ecology fears in S.Africa's Karoo (April, 2011) for Reuters
- On the street features for Battabox.

In early August 2019, Meyer was announced as a nominee for the 47th International Emmy Awards 2019 for her work on Sweet, Sweet Codeine, a documentary on drug abuse in Nigeria, created for the BBC Africa Eye. It was Nigeria's first-ever nomination for the award. Meyer was nominated under the Current Affairs & News Award.

Other awards include:

- One World Media Awards Winner– TV Documentary Award (June 2019)
- BBC NEWS Awards Winner – Investigation of The Year (June 2019)
- Royal Television Society Awards Nominee – Current Affairs International (Feb 2019)
- British Journalism Awards Nominee, - Global Investigation of the Year (Dec 2018)
- Nigerian Investigative Journalist of the Year, Wole Soyinka Centre (Dec. 2013)
- Financial Times Editorial Intern, Pearson Diversity Internship (July 2012)
- Winner, Thomson Reuters’ FitzGerald Prize (January 2010)
- Winner, ‘Nigeria's Young Journalist of the Year, The Future Awards (Feb 2010)
