= Sex trafficking in Dubai =

Sex trafficking in Dubai is an ongoing problem in Dubai. It began in the 20th century as the city grew into a global business hub with many migrant workers. Despite strict laws against prostitution, the city’s environment has allowed illegal activities to continue. New investigations have revealed new trafficking networks exploiting weak and vulnerable women migrants. The extent of sex trafficking had become a widespread phenomena that it caused media trends such as #Dubaiportapotty.

== Background ==
In the late 1900s, sex trafficking became more of a problem in the UAE, as its economy grew fast, depending on more foreign workers, who moved to the country. Women from Africa, Central Asia, Southeast Asia, and Eastern Europe were promised real working opportunities, but many of them were tricked by criminal groups, and were exploited. Recent investigations, the latest being a BBC report from September 2025, revealed trafficking rings, tricking young women, mainly from Uganda and Nigeria, to move to Dubai, with fake job offers. Once they arrive, they do not find real jobs but are forced by threats, violence, passport seizure and fake debts, to work as sex slaves.

== Modus operandi ==
The sex trafficking networks have a very simple operation method. Most sex traffickers are not Emiratis, they are foreigners or natives from the victims' own countries. They often promise real job opportunities to lure the women. But according to victims, they then use serious mental and physical abuse, including forced debts that could reach up to $10,000–$15,000, which forced women into prostitution just to pay off the fabricated debts. Death threats, and even torture, were also part of the operations method.

== Notable cases ==
=== 2025 BBC investigation ===
In September 2025 the BBC published its investigation about the Dubai sex trade ring, that identified Charles Mwesigwa as one of the main leaders, who targeted women from Uganda, promising false jobs in Dubai. According to the BBC, reports show women are forced into prostitution and degrading acts, including so-called “Dubai porta potty” parties, also know under to go in the media under Hashtag #Dubaiportapotty. An undercover investigation found these operations run in areas like Jumeirah Village Circle, where traffickers sell women to wealthy clients and hide using fake names and social media accounts.

=== 2023 Christy Gold (Christiana Jacob Uadiale) network ===
In 2023 an investigation conducted by ICIJ–Reuters, exposed a sex network, led by Christy Gold. As it turned out her real name was Christiana Jacob Uadiale. The network tricked women, mainly from Nigeria, to move to Dubai, as they were promised good jobs. But once they arrived in Dubai, they were forced into prostitution, under threats of false debt reaching up to $15,000. The women lived under constant fear of violence, threats, abuse and torture, as victims described. In early 2025 Christy Gold was arrested in Nigeria, following international investigations that exposed her role in exploiting hundreds of women.

=== Case of Maria Kovalchuk (Ukrainian model) ===
Maria Kovalchuk is a 20 year old Ukrainian model and OnlyFans creator, that in March 2025 was first reported missing for 10 days, then found with severe injuries that included a broken spine and broken arms and legs. According to her version, she was invited to a party where rich Russian men at the party hurt her badly. But according to Dubai police she fell from the building. As of 2025, after several surgeries she is in a wheelchair, Ukrainian police have an ongoing human trafficking investigation, as the case is still open.

== Legal status ==
Prostitution is against the law in the UAE, and it carries punishments such as fines, jail time, and deportation. despite the strict law, reports show that sex work and trafficking have been continuously going on for years in secret, especially in Dubai’s luxury clubs, hotels, and nightlife spots.

== Law response ==
The UAE government collaborates with foreign law enforcement agencies, INTERPOL, and anti-trafficking NGOs to strengthen prevention measures and facilitate the extradition of traffickers. Dedicated hotlines and a special police unit in Dubai provide victims with reporting channels, though effectiveness remains limited due to fears of retribution and potential criminal penalties for immigration related offenses. Recent international investigations and coordinated crackdowns have led to the worldwide arrests of more than 150 traffickers, with Dubai serving both as a transit point and a major destination for sexual exploitation. In July 2025, large-scale international operations safeguarded thousands of victims and dismantled trafficking networks, including ringleaders linked to operations in the UAE. Authorities in Dubai have also carried out investigations and, in some cases, extradited suspects to their countries to stand trial, including high-profile cases tied to organized crimes beyond sex trafficking.

== Protection and Prevention ==
According to the U.S. Department of State’s 2025 Trafficking in Persons Report, Dubai has established both protection and prevention measures for victims of sex trafficking such as dedicated shelters. The Dubai Foundation for Women and Children (DFWAC) provides housing and support for female and child victims of sex trafficking and abuse. The support includes include medical care, legal assistance, education programs, healthcare, reintegration support, counseling, and vocational training. In addition, the DFWAC maintains a hotline for reporting trafficking cases.

== See also ==
- Prostitution in the United Arab Emirates
- Human trafficking in the United Arab Emirates
- Human rights in United Arab Emirates
