= The Headstrong Historian =

2008 short story by Chimamanda Ngozi Adichie

- Short story by Chimamanda Ngozi Adichie
- Country: Nigeria
- Language: English

Publication
- Published in: The New Yorker; The Thing Around Your Neck
- Publisher: Fourth Estate (UK); Knopf (US)
- Media type: Print
- Publication date: 16 June 2008; April 2009 (reprint)

"The Headstrong Historian" is a short story by Nigerian author Chimamanda Ngozi Adichie. It was first published in The New Yorker on 16 June 2008, and later as one of the twelve stories in The Thing Around Your Neck in 2009. It won the O. Henry Prize in 2010. The short story portrays a woman named Nwamgba as the protagonist. She seeks justice against her late husband's family and cousin over the murder as well as confiscation of her inheritance. It explores themes commonly used by Adichie, including culture, feminism, and social identity.

Chinua Achebe's Things Fall Apart has been speculated by critics as the hypotext of the short story. Meanwhile, some critics have disputed the statement adding some similarities while stating the narratives of both doesn't relay easily.

== Background ==
Chimamanda Ngozi Adichie was born in 1977 after the colonial rule of Nigeria. Although she started writing at age 15, her literary career began in 2003 with the publication of Purple Hibiscus. She went on to publish her second novel Half of a Yellow Sun in 2006. During those period, she wrote many articles for many periodicals and magazines as well as short stories, poems, and essays. It was during those period that she wrote "The Headstrong Historian" in a 2008 issue of The New Yorker. In an interview with Renee Shea for Kenyon Review, Adichie stated that she publishes in The New Yorker not only because they pay well, but also because they have high prestige. She published her first story "Cell One" in the magazine before the second one "The Headstrong Historian". She also stated that she "did not think [The Headstrong Historian] was at all New Yorker material, so when my agent said she'd sent it there, I thought, why?"

Adichie's work often explores themes of race, identity, marriage and gender, culture, and politics among others. They are particularly developed in the context of postcolonial Africa. She has also cited influence from authors of post-colonial literature like Chinua Achebe and Buchi Emecheta. During an interview, she was asked of her character Obierika who she wrote about her later life from Achebe's Things Fall Apart. She cited her inspiration from Achebe's work stating "I just took the name. It's a name I quite like. It means heart . . .obviously, though, reading it in Achebe's work was the beginning of loving the name". In 2009, she wrote her first short story collection The Thing Around Your Neck, which contained 12 short stories (of which many have been published in a periodical or magazine). Among the twelve stories was "The Headstrong Historian", a reprint of the 2008 edition. Most of Adichie's story in the collection were set in the US, but when asked if all were set in the US, she said "No, most are set in the US except for "Cell One" and "The Headstrong Historian".

== Sources ==
Many critics have speculated that the "Headstrong Historian" is a continuation of Achebe's Things Fall Apart. They called it the hypotext. According to some scholars, Adichie has always cited Achebe as an influence to her literary career, and she has demonstrated it also including by starting the first chapter of her novel Purple Hibiscus with "things started falling apart" (a cutoff from Achebe's novel title). Susan VanZanten has disputed the statement asserting that the short story is "neither an adaption nor an appropriation". However she writes that the short story tells the same general historical narrative as Achebe's novel, a story of traditional Igbo culture through of a central protagonist over the influence of European missionaries and British colonial officials. She argues that:

1. Both occurs in the same time and space but follows different characters and events. She claims "The Headstrong Historian" moves beyond the narrative time of Things Fall Apart to tell subsequent events, hence rounding out Achebe's novel in both the present and the future.

2. Although both follows same Igbo political structure as well as cultural depictions, the short story uses a female protagonist called Nwamgba, instead of Achebe's male Okonkwo.

Adichie follows Achebe's method of positioning fictional characters as the torchbearers of social identity. Scholars David Mikailu and Brendan Wattenberg claims cosmopolitan temporality as one of the major themes of the short story. The term cosmopolitan temporality is analysed with Achebe's assertion that the colonial depiction of both Africa and Africans is "a deliberate invention to facilitate two gigantic historical events: the Atlantic slave trade and the European colonisation of Africa". Hence the theme lives with the character Grace, who like Adichie born in 1977, didn't witness this Achebe's assertion, but as a "headstrong historian" rewrites the history with memory while keeping the original assertion.

In a review, David Mikailu and Brendan Wattenberg wrote that in Adichie's The Thing Around Your Neck, "The Headstrong Historian" "evokes the wide canvas of a historical narrative in a masterfully concise form".

== Sources ==
- VanZanten, Susan (2015). ""The Headstrong Historian": Writing with Things Fall Apart". Research in African Literatures. 46 (2): 85. doi:10.2979/reseafrilite.46.2.85.
- Mikailu, David; Wattenberg, Brendan (2015-09-25). "My Name Will Not Be Lost: Cosmopolitan Temporality and Reclaimed History in Chimamanda Ngozi Adichie's "The Headstrong Historian"". African Studies Quarterly. 15 (4): 45–58. ISSN 2152-2448.
- Doherty, Brian (2014). "Writing Back with a Difference: Chimamanda Ngozi Adichie's "The Headstrong Historian" as a Response to Chinua Achebe's". Matatu. 45 (1): 187–201. doi:10.1163/9789401211093_012. ISSN 0932-9714.
