= Kiki Mordi =

Nigerian journalist and media personality

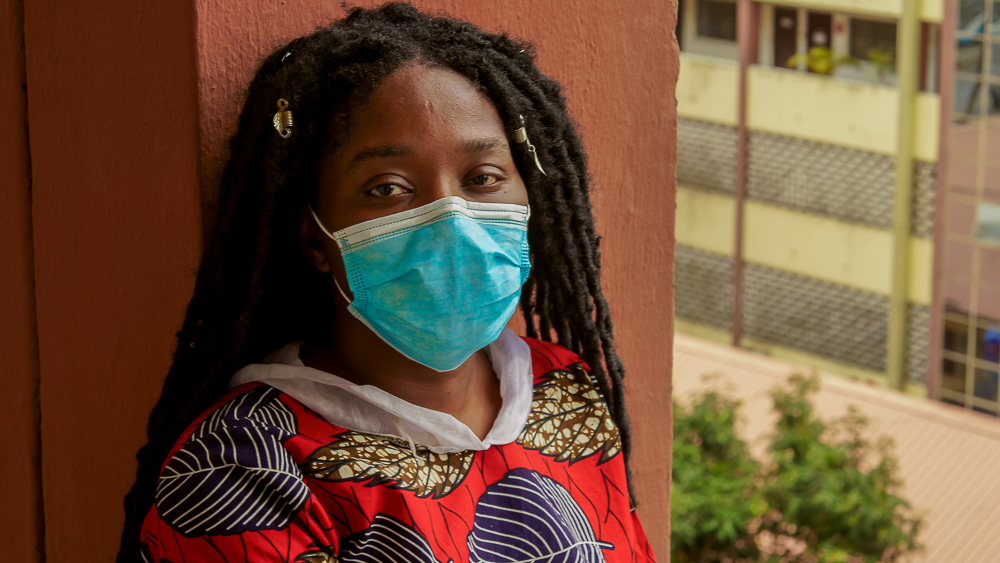
- Born: Nkiru Mordi
- Occupations: Investigative journalist, filmmaker
- Awards: 2020 International Emmy Awards Current Affairs & News,2019 People Journalism Prize For Africa Prize for Journalism,
- Website: Official website

Nkiru "Kiki" Mordi is a Nigerian investigative journalist, filmmaker, writer and entrepreneur. She dropped out of school because she was harassed by a lecturer in her school. This ordeal was what led her to shoot the Sex for Grades video with the BBC Africa Eye. The documentary exposed the depth of sexual harassment among Nigerians and Ghanaian lecturers. In 2016, she won the award of Outstanding Radio Program Presenter (South-South) at the Nigerian Broadcasters Merit Awards.

== Career ==
Mordi is a Nigerian investigative journalist and on-air personality. She is known for the 2019 BBC Africa Eye program Sex for Grades documentary that amplified the voices of victims of sexual assault in tertiary institutions in Nigeria and Ghana. In 2017, Mordi started an online petition to stop the extortion and exploitation of youths by the Nigeria policemen. She launched this petition after her ordeal with some Nigerian policemen who invaded her home, arrested her and boyfriend and accused them of being cultists and obstructing justice. In October 2019, Mordi and her team at the BBC Africa Eye released the 13-minute Sex for Grades documentary.

She also produced a documentary film Life at the Bay in Lagos, Nigeria. The film tells the story of the inhabitants of Tarkwa Bay and the survival and struggles of their women. The film was later selected by Real Time International Film Festival. It was also to show at the 2019 Africa International Film Festival. In 2020, she was listed as one of the Most Influential Young Africans alongside Alex Iwobi, Adekunle Gold, Falz, Adetola Nola, among others.

== 2019 Sex for Grades documentary ==
On 7 October 2019, Mordi and her team at the BBC Africa Eye released a 13-minute documentary exposing sexual harassment of students by lecturers in University of Lagos and University of Ghana. Dr. Boniface Igbeneghu of University of Lagos, Dr. Ransford Gyampo and Dr. Paul Kwame Butakor of University of Ghana were the lecturers implicated in a viral video that came with the exposé. Igbeneghu is a senior lecturer in the faculty of arts, University of Lagos and a pastor of the Foursquare Gospel Church in Nigeria. Gyampo is an associate professor of Political Science at the University of Ghana and Butakor is a lecturer at the College of Education in the University of Ghana. Mordi, who was disguised as a 17-year-old admission seeker in the video, stated that it took she and her team nine months to complete the investigation. After the exposé, Gyampo threatened to sue the BBC. Due to the documentary, University of Lagos suspended Igbeneghu and Foursquare Gospel Church asked him to step down from the pulpit. A "Cold Room" caught in the video where lecturers sexually harass students was shut down by the University of Lagos. Nigerian musician, Adekunle Gold and wife, Simi, hailed Mordi for her Sex for Grades documentary. A former vice president of Nigeria, Atiku Abubakar and a former senate president of Nigeria, Bukola Saraki, called on the Nigerian government to take immediate action against sexual harassment in Nigerian universities. In an interview with Sahara Reporters, Mordi revealed that she has received subtle threats since concluding the investigation.

On 8 October 2019, Mordi and her team at the BBC Africa Eye released a full hour long documentary that featured more lecturers that are guilty of sexually harassing students and led to the suspension of Dr Samuel Oladipo, a lecturer at the Department of Economics, University of Lagos.

On 9 October 2019, the Nigerian senate heeded the call of Nigerians and re-introduced the anti-sexual harassment bill and was read on the floor of the senate.

On 9 July 2020, the Nigerian Senate passed the anti-sexual harassment bill, while proposing up to 14 years jail term for offenders.

== Awards and nominations ==
Year	Award	Category	Result	Recipient
2020	International Emmy Awards Current Affairs & News	Current Affairs	Nominated	BBC Africa Eye: Sex for Grades
2019	People Journalism Prize For Africa	Prize for Journalism	Won	Herself
2019	The Future Awards Africa	Prize for Journalism	Nominated	Herself
2016	Scream All-Youth Awards	On-air Personality of the Year (Female)	Nominated	Herself
2016	Nigerian Broadcasters Merit Awards	Outstanding Radio Program Presenter (South-South)	Won	Herself
2015	Nigerian Broadcasters Merit Awards	The Most Promising Young Presenter (TV/Radio)	Nominated	Herself

== See also ==
- List of Nigerian media personalities
- List of Nigerian human rights activists
