= Human trafficking in the United Arab Emirates =

The United Arab Emirates ratified the 2000 UN TIP Protocol in January 2009.

In 2017 the United Arab Emirates was a destination country for men and women who are mostly trafficked for labor and prostitution. The U.S. State Department's Office to Monitor and Combat Trafficking in Persons placed the country in "Tier 2" in 2017 and 2023.

== The situation ==
Women from India, Sri Lanka, Bangladesh, Indonesia, Ethiopia, Eritrea, Sudan, Pakistan, and the Philippines travel willingly to the U.A.E. and Arab states of the Persian Gulf to work as domestic servants, but some subsequently face conditions of involuntary servitude such as excessive work hours without pay, unlawful withholding of passports, restrictions on movement, non-payment of wages, and physical or sexual abuse at the hands of their employers.

Ansar Burney Welfare Trust reported in 2001 about thousands of young boys being trafficked from Pakistan and other impoverished, generally Muslim countries, to the UAE. Ansar further claimed that there the boys would be subjected to working as camel jockeys, underfed, crash diets to reduce weight and less pay.

Similarly, men from India, Sri Lanka, Bangladesh, and Pakistan are drawn to the U.A.E. to work in the construction industry, but are often subjected to similar conditions of coercive labor and to debt bondage as they work to pay off recruitment costs sometimes exceeding the equivalent of two years’ wages.

Many countries, especially the home countries of laborers, have turned a blind eye due to the economic wealth exported from the U.A.E. to the home countries because without the flow of income their economic position would be troubled.

== Government efforts ==
In 2008 the government increased prosecutions, convictions, and sentences for sex trafficking offenders; trained law enforcement officers on anti-trafficking methods; opened a shelter for victims of trafficking; and continued its efforts to support former child camel jockeys and reached agreements to provide compensation to them. Nonetheless, the U.A.E. did not aggressively prosecute or punish acts of trafficking for forced labor, since the rule of wasta over law despite potential of a widespread problem among domestic and low skilled foreign workers. The only rule is "show that the government is fighting against trafficking" but they are organizing everything to make the traffic work.

== Prosecution (2008) ==
The U.A.E. government made progress in prosecuting acts of sex trafficking over the last year, but showed limited efforts to punish forced labor. The U.A.E. prohibits all forms of trafficking through Federal Law No. 51, which prescribes penalties ranging from one year to life imprisonment. Prescribed penalties under this law are sufficiently stringent and commensurate with those for other grave crimes, such as rape. The U.A.E.’s labor law, however, does not sufficiently protect workers in domestic service, making them vulnerable to forced labor. During this reporting period, the U.A.E. prosecuted and convicted 15 individuals for sex trafficking; their sentences ranged from nine months’ to 10 years’ imprisonment. The U.A.E. government also reported investigating an additional seven trafficking suspects and filing charges against six others for sex trafficking. Nonetheless, criminal law enforcement efforts against trafficking for forced labor remain severely inadequate; despite continuing reports of widespread and prevalent conditions of labor exploitation, the government referred only one recruitment agent for prosecution, but reported no convictions or punishments for such crimes. To improve their capacity and technical skills, the government trained law enforcement officers, prosecutors, and judges on anti-trafficking investigation and prosecution techniques. The government also hired over 200 new labor inspectors, bringing the total to approximately 425 inspectors to enforce labor laws; these inspectors went through three-month training courses in labor law and other key skills in identifying and addressing labor violations, including trafficking-related offenses.

== Protection (2008) ==
During the reporting period, the Government of the U.A.E. made noticeable, but uneven, efforts to protect victims of trafficking. In July, Dubai authorities opened a government shelter for victims of abuse, including victims of trafficking. Between October 2007 and March 2008, this shelter provided rehabilitation services to 28 trafficking victims. Government officials and NGOs may refer victims to this shelter. Although the government trained law enforcement officers on victim sensitivity, the U.A.E. continues to lack a formal and comprehensive procedure to proactively identify victims of trafficking among vulnerable populations, such as foreign women detained and charged for prostitution violations and those arrested for immigration violations. As a result, some victims of trafficking who do not identify themselves to authorities are detained and automatically deported for unlawful acts as a result of being trafficked. Women who formally identify themselves as trafficking victims may access government-provided temporary housing in hotels, counseling, medical care, and repatriation aid in Dubai. Until the opening of the government shelter, the Dubai government also referred self-identified victims to an NGO-sponsored shelter. Because the U.A.E. does not offer victims long-term legal alternatives to removal to source countries where they may face retribution, however, many victims are reluctant to report being trafficked. Officers in police stations reportedly encourage victims to assist in trafficking investigations, but many victims still fear arrest, deportation, or retribution from their traffickers. Importantly, victims who agree to testify against their traffickers receive incentives that encourage them to stay in the U.A.E. and cooperate, such as shelter and alternative employment pending a trial. In practice, government authorities continue to interpret the anti-trafficking law to exclude some who have been forced into commercial sexual exploitation or labor. For instance, victims who willingly come to the U.A.E. with the intent of entering into prostitution may be treated as criminals and deported regardless of any victimization that may occur after their arrival. Similarly, the U.A.E. generally does not recognize males forced into labor as trafficking victims, particularly if they are over the age of 18 and entered the country voluntarily. As such, victims of forced labor who run away from their sponsors may be arrested and automatically deported for immigration violations. In addition protection for males who have been forced into labor is rare as their family, friends, and general society expects them to be inept enough to overcome challenges.

== Prevention (2008) ==
The U.A.E. has made efforts to prevent trafficking this year. To address the issue of non-payment of wages, which contributes to the debt bondage of some workers, the Ministry of Labor announced in October 2007 that salaries of foreign workers must be paid through an electronic system that can be monitored; this nascent system is increasing, but is not yet uniform. To support child camel jockeys and prevent re-trafficking, the U.A.E. committed approximately $8 million to UNICEF to aid repatriated camel jockeys; separately, the U.A.E. signed Memoranda of Understanding with Pakistan, Bangladesh, Sudan, and Mauritania to establish claims facilities to compensate former child camel jockeys for their injuries. The Emirati government provided $15 million in financial assistance to a global UN conference on trafficking. The government did not make significant efforts to raise public awareness of trafficking issues domestically, such as among Emirati employers of foreign workers. Similarly, the government did not initiate a significant public awareness campaign to reduce the demand for commercial sex acts. Dubai authorities shut down two nightclubs notorious for prostitution of foreign nationals. The government did not institute an awareness program targeted for nationals traveling to known child sex tourism destinations abroad. .

== See also ==
- Human rights in the United Arab Emirates
- Slavery in the United Arab Emirates
- Sex trafficking in Dubai
