= We Should All Be Feminists (talk) =

2012 Ted Talk by Chimamanda Ngozi Adichie

"We Should All Be Feminists" is a 2012 TED Talk delivered by Chimamanda Ngozi Adichie. It was part of TEDxEuston in London, UK. The talk was later turned into a book-length essay of the same name. According to Adichie, she accepted an invitation to speak in London in 2012, at TEDxEuston, because a series of talks focusing on African affairs was being organised by her brother Chuks, who worked in the technology and information development department there, and she wanted to help him. In the talk, Adichie stressed the importance of reclaiming the word "feminist" to combat the negative connotations previously associated with it. She said that feminism should be about exploring the intersections of oppression, such as how class, race, gender and sexuality influence equal opportunities and human rights, causing global gender gaps in education, pay and power.

== Sources ==
- Anasuya, Shreya Ila (20 June 2015). "Chimamanda Ngozi Adichie Speaks as Well as She Writes, Maybe Better". Scroll.in. Cambridge, Massachusetts. Archived from the original on 5 June 2023.
- Behrmann, Erika M. (July 2017). "Book and Media Reviews: Adichie, Chimamanda Ngozi. 'We Should All Be Feminists', TEDxEuston Talk". Women's Studies in Communication. 40 (3). Abingdon-on-Thames, Oxfordshire: Routledge: 315–316. doi:10.1080/07491409.2017.1334456. ISSN 0749-1409. OCLC 7082968906. – via Taylor & Francis (subscription required)
- Wagner, Erica (3 November 2015). "Chimamanda Ngozi Adichie: 'I Wanted To Claim My Own Name'". British Vogue. London, UK. Archived from the original on 18 October 2023.
