= Mama's Sleeping Scarf =

2023 children book by Chimamanda Ngozi Adichie

- First edition
- Author: Chimamanda Ngozi Adichie
- Illustrator: Joelle Avelino
- Genre: Children's literature
- Publisher: HarperCollins Children's Books, Knopf
- Publication date: 5 September 2023
- Media type: Print and digital: Hardcover; e-Book; Audiobook
- Pages: 32
- ISBN: 9780008550073 (HarperCollins edition)

Mama's Sleeping Scarf is a 2023 children's picture book written by Nigerian writer Chimamanda Ngozi Adichie under the pseudonym Nwa Grace-James (Note: This translates to "the child of Grace James" which is a tribute to her mother.) and illustrated by Congolese-Angolan illustrator Joelle Avelino. The narrative centers on Chino, a young child who finds solace in her mother's scarf while awaiting her return.

The story unfolds as Chino, longing for her mother's presence, is comforted by the familiar scent and feel of her mother's sleeping scarf. Throughout the day, Chino engages in various activities with her grandparents and father, with the scarf serving as a source of reassurance and warmth. The book's illustrations, praised for their vibrant and fantastical backgrounds, complement the tale's tender and relatable narrative.

Adichie's decision to write a children's book was driven by a desire to document the memories of her daughter, with the character of Chino based on her.

Published as part of a three-book deal with HarperCollins Children's Books in the UK and Knopf in the US, Mama's Sleeping Scarf has been released in various formats, including hardcover, eBook, and audiobook, with a Spanish edition also available. The book's reception has been mixed, with some critics desiring more adventure and substance, while others have found it to be a cozy and lively read.

== Plot ==
The story follows Chino, a young child who longs for the warmth of her mother who had left early in the morning. Chino finds her mother's scarf, which pacifies her. She then spends the day with her grandparents and father until her mother returns in the evening.

Throughout the day, Chino engages in various activities with her grandparents and father, with the scarf serving as a source of reassurance and warmth.

== Writing and publication ==
Chimamanda Ngozi Adichie wanted to write a children book but was hesitant and was worried that "she would have somebody die" as she thought that her creativity was "too dark". Adichie chose to use a different pen name, Nwa Grace-James, which translates to "child of Grace James" and is a tribute to her mother. Adichie did this to create a separate entity and would act as her pen name for future children's books. Adichie finally conceived the idea to write a children's book to document the memories of her child but started writing when her child was four years old; Adichie then left the book for two more years and resumed writing after the death of her own father. The first two drafts of the book was canceled by Adichie because it bored her daughter who the main character—Chino—was based on.

According to Adichie, several artists' illustration samples were sent to her. She felt that Joelle Avelino—a Congolese-Angolan who grew up in the United Kingdom—captured African life.

The book was published on 5 September 2023 as the first part of a three-book deal with HarperCollins Children's Books in the UK and Knopf in the US. Mama's Sleeping Scarf was published in hardcover and eBook formats and as audio-book by Penguin Random House.

The Spanish edition, El pañuelo de mamá, was published in February 2024.

Following the publication, Adichie held a book launch with the theme "Christmas Magic with Chimamanda" in Lagos, Nigeria, to celebrate her first children's book.

== Reception ==
Kirkus Reviews praised the "bright, fantastical backgrounds with repeating circular patterns" while noting that the book "is a cozy read-aloud to help little ones wind down before a nap or bed." While Publishers Weekly called a "straightforward yet lively telling". In a mixed review, Chinelo Eze of The Guardian reviewed "[i]t would have been nice to see more adventure and substance in some of the scenes" before concluding it is "a treasure for mothers looking for the perfect bonding moments with their daughters, and it is a tale that is not so unfamiliar for a child."

It was listed on Publishers Weekly's "New and Noteworthy Children's and YA Books" of September 2023, The Guardian's "Children's and Teens Best New Picture Books and Novels", and The Independent's "5 New Books To Read This Week" where it received a 7/10 rating.
