= A Private Experience =

2008 short story by Chimamanda Ngozi Adichie

"A Private Experience" is a 2008 short story by Chimamanda Ngozi Adichie. It was first published in The Guardian.

== Sources ==
- Gale, C. (2018). "A Study Guide for Chimamanda Ngozi Adichie's ""A Private Experience""". Short Stories for Students. Gale, Cengage Learning. ISBN 978-0-02-866550-4.
