= We Should All Be Feminists =

2014 book by Chimamanda Ngozi Adichie

- Cover of Fourth Estate edition
- Author: Chimamanda Ngozi Adichie
- Language: English
- Genre: Essay
- Publisher: Fourth Estate
- Publication date: 2014
- Publication place: United Kingdom
- Media type: Print (paperback)
- Pages: 64
- ISBN: 978-0008115272
- Followed by: Dear Ijeawele, or A Feminist Manifesto in Fifteen Suggestions

We Should All Be Feminists is a book-length essay by the Nigerian author Chimamanda Ngozi Adichie. First published in 2014 by Fourth Estate, it offers a definition of feminism for the 21st century.

The book was adapted from Adichie's 2012 TEDx talk of the same name, delivered at TEDxEuston in London, which has been viewed more than eight million times.

== Content ==
We Should All Be Feminists includes anecdotes and analyses about what it means to be a feminist. Early in the book, Adichie recalls the first time she was called a feminist (before she knew what the word meant). She was conversing with a much-admired male friend and when he used the word to describe her, she was confused as she realized it was not a compliment: "I could tell from his tone—the same tone with which a person would say, 'You're a supporter of terrorism.'" She goes on to argue that "feminist" isn't an insult, but rather a label that should be embraced by everyone. She writes that while feminism advocates for equity between men and women in all aspects of life, the fiercest opponents of women's liberation believe that feminism is a social movement aimed at reversing gender roles and making men inferior.

The book questions long-held beliefs and gender stereotypes that perpetuate inequality between men and women. Adichie highlights the need for a cultural shift to attain gender equality and outlines the ways in which people can contribute to this shift. She claims that we should all be feminists not only as a commitment to women's liberation, but as a way of encouraging men to engage in conversations with women on sexuality, appearance, roles, and success.

Adichie writes that feminism does not deny biological differences between male and female. Instead, it champions the rights of women, seeks to reduce sexism by creating equal chances for men and women, and tackles the injustices that stifle people's will to exceed societal expectations. In her view, becoming a feminist normalizes women's success, and enables men to strive to accomplish more.

Participating in Adichie's vision of feminism paves the way for a prosperous and all-inclusive future society. Thus, empowering women does not take away opportunities from men. Teaching the community to accord equal respect to women creates a conducive environment for success. Therefore, encouraging people to become feminists turns their minds away from cultural and social constructs that limit their understanding of gender on sexuality and roles, and allows men and women to become who they want to be without restrictions. The book is critical of the way masculinity is constructed, suggesting that society as a whole must change if we are to achieve equality.

== Adaptations ==
Audio from Adichie's TED talk was included in Beyoncé's 2013 song "Flawless". Adichie was credited with a featured role on the track. She has largely remained silent about Beyoncé's use of her speech, but in a 2016 interview in the Dutch newspaper De Volkskrant, she acknowledged that Beyoncé reached many people who might otherwise never have heard the word "feminism". Adichie added:

Still, her type of feminism is not mine, as it is the kind that, at the same time, gives quite a lot of space to the necessity of men. I think men are lovely, but I don't think that women should relate everything they do to men: did he hurt me, do I forgive him, did he put a ring on my finger? We women are so conditioned to relate everything to men. Put a group of women together and the conversation will eventually be about men. Put a group of men together and they will not talk about women at all, they will just talk about their own stuff. We women should spend about 20 percent of our time on men, because it's fun, but otherwise we should also be talking about our own stuff.

== Reception ==
In The Telegraph, Rupert Hawksley said of We Should All Be Feminists: "it just might be the most important book you read all year." The Independent selected it as a book of the year, for it "would be the book I'd press into the hands of girls and boys, as an inspiration for a future 'world of happier men and happier women who are truer to themselves'." In The Progressive magazine, Julia Burke praised Adichie's "great gift of distilling concepts that could otherwise be too academic, too heady, into what feels like a line your wise older sister just uttered while fixing her hair."

In December 2015, the Swedish Women's Lobby and publisher Albert Bonniers revealed that the book would be distributed to every 16-year-old high school student in Sweden, with the intention that it will "work as a stepping stone for a discussion about gender equality and feminism". The effort is supported by the UN Association of Sweden, the Swedish Trade Union Confederation, the Order of the Teaspoon, Unizon and Gertrud Åström. They "hope that teachers will integrate We Should All Be Feminists into their teaching, and will be distributing discussion guidelines to help".

In September 2016, designer Maria Grazia Chiuri, the first female creative director in the 70-year history of the fashion house Dior, at her premiere show for the brand featured a T-shirt bearing the statement: "We Should All Be Feminists".

Adichie's book is excerpted in Margaret Busby's 2019 anthology New Daughters of Africa.

== See also ==
- "We Should All Be Feminists" – 2012 TED Talk.
