= Apollo (short story) =

2015 short story by Chimamanda Ngozi Adichie

Apollo is a 2015 short story by Chimamanda Ngozi Adichie. It was first published in The New Yorker.

== Sources ==
- Edoro, Ainehi (7 April 2015). "Adichie's Dreamy Little Story About Bruce Lee and Apollo". Brittle Paper.
- Adichie, Chimamanda Ngozi (2015-04-06). ""Apollo"". The New Yorker. ISSN 0028-792X.
- Adams, John (2015-04-07). "Chimamanda Ngozi Adichie on "Apollo"". The John Adams Institute.
