= Ezeoke Nsu =

Ezeoke Nsu is a village in Imo State, Nigeria. A hilly town thought to have evolved in the 16th century, the earliest record of its history was in 1869, when Christian missionaries first visited the town. The headquarters of Anglican Diocese of Okigwe South is situated in the village.
