= Jamal Osman (journalist) =

Somali-born British journalist

Jamal Osman جمال عثمان
- Born: Jamal Muhumed Osman; 1970s Kismayo, Somali Democratic Republic
- Occupations: Journalist, broadcast reporter

Jamal Osman (Somali: Jamaal Cismaan, Arabic: جمال عثمان) is a Somali-born British journalist, filmmaker and broadcast reporter. He has produced and reported for Channel 4, The Guardian and Al-Jazeera English, and specializes on stories pertaining to Africa.

== Awards ==
- RTS Independent Award 2012
- One World Media Award 2012, Journalist of the Year
- Amnesty International Media Awards 2010, Gaby Rado Memorial Award
- Foreign Press Association Awards 2009, News Story of the Year
- Kingston University News Reporter of the Year 2009
- Royal Television Society Award 2010, RTS Independent Award
- Amnesty International Media Awards 2009, shortlisted
- Rory Peck Impact Award 2009
