= BBC Africa Eye =

BBC World Service investigative division

- Motto: Nothing stays hidden forever.
- Area: Worldwide
- Owner: BBC
- Parent: BBC World Service
- Established: 2018
- Official website: Official website
- Language: English, Hausa, Swahili and French

BBC Africa Eye is an investigative branch of the BBC World Service. It has a network of local and investigative journalists and researchers working across Africa and produces a bi-weekly TV and online investigations series broadcast in English, Hausa, Swahili and French. The series focuses on topics that are of interest and concern to young and underserved audience and aims to strengthen and encourage investigative journalism across Africa.

BBC Africa Eye has produced over 100 investigative journalism documentaries in countries such as Nigeria, Kenya, Ghana, Cameroon, Uganda, Ethiopia, Tanzania and South Africa which have won dozens of awards. Productions range from ten minutes to nearly an hour, and include in-depth undercover investigations as well as open-source journalistic investigations. BBC Africa Eye's coverage has been credited with restoring Nigerian audience's faith in Western media. However, researchers have questioned how far the documentaries constitute a departure from typical Western media coverage of Africa.

== History ==
Africa Eye was established April 2018 as part of the largest expansion of the BBC World Service since the 1940s. Nisha Kapur, Commissioning Editor for TV said: "Africa Eye will promote the culture of investigative journalism across Africa and strengthen the skills of African investigative journalists. All of the programmes will be based on in-depth reporting that holds power to account. They will tackle topics that are of intense interest and concern to audiences in Africa. These reports will be produced in a fresh and contemporary style that resonates with young audiences."

The series' first documentary was a co-production between Africa Eye and BBC Pidgin, titled Sweet Sweet Codeine. The documentary followed Nigerian journalists Ruona Meyer and Adejuwon Soyinka's undercover investigation, which revealed widespread abuse of a prescription cough medicine laced with an opioid drug, codeine. Less than 24 hours after the documentary was released, the Nigerian government banned the import and manufacture of codeine-based syrup. The film was nominated for an International Emmy and won the One World Media TV Documentary Award 2019.

=== Notable open-source coverage ===
Analysis of footage from June 2018 exposed Cameroon's Rapid Intervention Brigade soldiers burning civilian houses down in the Southwest Region, a region where journalists have been systematically denied access in an effort to prevent coverage of the Anglophone Crisis.

BBC Africa Eye used more than 300 videos shot on protestors' phone at the Khartoum massacre on 3 June 2019 in Sudan to report on the killing of over 100 people. The documentary, Sudan's Livestream Massacre, exposed Mohamed Hamdan Dagalo, who previously ran the notorious government-backed Janjaweed militias, as ordering the massacre.

During the Libyan civil war, the BBC Africa Eye and BBC Arabic Documentaries revealed that a drone operated by the United Arab Emirates (UAE) killed 26 young cadets at a military academy in Tripoli, on 4 January. Most of the cadets were teenagers and none of them were armed. The Chinese-made drone Wing Loong II fired Blue Arrow 7 missile, which was operated from UAE-run Al-Khadim Libyan air base. In February, these drones stationed in Libya were moved to an air base near Siwa in the western Egyptian desert. Subsequently, The Guardian probed and discovered the blatant violation of UN arms embargo by the UAE and Turkey on 7 October 2020.

In April, 2021, BBC Africa Eye, in collaboration with Bellingcat and Newsy confirmed the authenticity of footage of the Mahbere Dego massacres in Tigray, evidence in the war crimes in the Tigray War.

=== Reception ===
==== Sweet Sweet Codeine ====
Sweet Sweet Codeine (premiered April 30, 2018) was BBC Africa Eye's first documentary. It revealed widespread abuse of a prescription cough medicine laced with an opioid drug, codeine. The Nigerial government had previously estimated more than three million bottles of codeine syrup were being consumed every day in just two states. These syrups can cause organ failure if overused. The Nigerian government banned the import and manufacture of codeine-based syrup within 24-hours of the documentary's premier. Later, the Nigerian federal government recalled more than 2.4 million bottles of codeine cough syrup from the market and the National Agency for Food and Drug Administration and Control raided four pharmaceutical companies, dozens of dealers were arrested, and the Nigerian Drug Law Enforcement Agency allocated resources to prevent smuggling.

Following the release of the documentary, the Pharmacy Council of Ghana launched an investigation into the abuse of codeine and another painkiller, Tramadol, and in June 2018, as part of the country's National Medicines Policy review, Health Minister Kwaku Agyemang-Manu banned all production and importation of codeine syrup.

A 2021 UN report on pharmaceutical opioids trafficking in West Africa found the bans which followed the airing of Sweet Sweet Codeine curbed both the demand and availability of codeine-based medications. However, the United Nations Office on Drugs and Crimes noted that the bans sometimes lacked administrative support, accompanying enforcement measures and were weakened by ineffective border controls. Additionally, while the significant increase of syrup prices detered many users, it also made smuggling of codeine medications more lucrative.

Sweet Sweet Codeine was the first time a Nigerian film and a BBC World Service production was nominated for an Emmy.

==== Other productions ====
Ghanaian investigative journalist Anas Aremeyaw Anas went undercover his investigative film Number 12, a version of which premiered in June, 2018 under the title Betraying The Game as part BBC Africa Eye, who provided technical support for the investigation and secured the right to show it to a global audience. Ghanaian President of the Football Association, Kwesi Nyantakyi, was forced to resign following the documentary.

Rehab Nightmare (premiered July 29, 2018) documented Islamic rehab centres in Nairobi, Kenya where patients are routinely tortured, abused and beaten. One of the institutions featured in the documentary, the Darushifa Rehabilitation Centre in Nairobi's Eastleigh, was closed within days of the documentary's premiere. Kenyan authorities shut down two other illegal centres and arrested their staff following the release of the documentary. In 2022, the Kenyan Directorate of Criminal Investigations said it had partnered with the United States embassy in Nairobi, Immigration Services and the Office of the Directorate of Public Prosecution to contain illegal operations of rehabilitation centres.

In partnership with Amnesty International, Bellingcat and independent analysts on Twitter, Anatomy of a Killing (premiered September 23, 2018) was an open source investigation which exposed the people behind the execution of four civilians (two women and two children) from a viral video. The perpetrators were part of the Cameroonian army, and the three of the individuals who pulled the triggers were ultimately identified. Seven Cameroonian soldiers were tried, five convicted and four jailed for ten years for the murder of the four civilians. The production won a Peabody Award.

In Sex for Grades (premiered October 8, 2019) Nigerian investigative journalist Kiki Mordi exposed lecturers sexually harassing students in University of Lagos and University of Ghana. Dr. Samuel Oladipo and Dr. Boniface Igbeneghu of University of Lagos, Dr. Ransford Gyampo and Dr. Paul Kwame Butakor of University of Ghana were the lecturers implicated in a viral video that came with the exposé. After the exposé, Gyampo threatened to sue the BBC. Due to the documentary, University of Lagos suspended Igbeneghu and Foursquare Gospel Church asked him to step down from the pulpit. Oladipo was also suspended following the release of the documentary. A "Cold Room" caught in the video where lecturers sexually harass students was shut down by the University of Lagos. Immediately after the release of the documentary, the Nigerian senate re-introduced the anti-sexual harassment bill and was read on the floor of the senate. On 9 July 2020, the Nigerian Senate passed the anti-sexual harassment bill, while proposing up to 14 years jail term for offenders. Nigerian universities have increasingly instituted sexual harassment policies, however, the effectiveness of these policies have been questioned by scholars who note the lack of deep engagement by universities with questions of gender inequality. The documentary was nominated for an international Emmy.

The Baby Stealers (premiered November 15, 2020) revealed government and private hospitals were complicit in the theft and trafficking of babies, taken from their mothers without consent. The investigation also revealed alleged corruption at Mama Lucy Kibaki, a public hospital in Nairobi. In the wake of the BBC Africa Eye story, police chief Hillary Mutyambai ordered an investigation into hospitals, as well as children's homes in the Kenyan capital. Kenyan authorities arrested people allegedly running a child-trafficking syndicate. At least two of the people involved in trafficking infants have been convicted as of 2023. The Baby Stealers was the first time a Kenyan production was nominated for an international Emmy.

== Notable productions ==
Release date	Title	Director	Reporter(s)	Synopsis	Run time
Apr 30, 2018	Sweet Sweet Codeine: Nigeria's Cough Syrup Crisis	Charlie Northcott	Ruona Meyer; Adejuwon Soyinka		52:54
Jun 19, 2018	My Stolen Childhood: Understanding West Africa's Trokosi System	Paul Myles; Joe Jewell	Brigitte Sossou Perenyi		25:41
Jul 15, 2018	My Neighbour The Rapist	Steve Allen	Golden Mtika		42:58
Jun 25, 2018	Cameroon Burning: The Unseen War				9:43
Jul 29, 2018	Rehab Nightmare: Drugs, Chains And Canes	Seamus Mirodan	Jamal Osman		25:55
Aug 13, 2018	Human Harvest	Darius Bazargan	Anas Aremeyaw Anas		25:21
Sep 9, 2018	Hunting Down Gangsters with Kenya's Ahmed Rashid		Jamal Osman		27:49
Sep 23, 2018	Anatomy of a Killing				11:26
Dec 3, 2018	Kamwe Kamwe: Inside Burundi's Killing Machine	Charlotte Attwood; Maud Jullien			22:59
Feb 6, 2019	Betraying The Game: Anas Aremeyaw Anas Investigates Football In Africa	Clive Patterson	Anas Aremeyaw Anas		51:05
May 7, 2019	Meet the Night Runners	Seamus Mirodan	Tom Odula		50:47
May 19, 2019	The Hidden Lives Of 'Housegirls'	Elizabeth C. Jones	Nancy Kacungira	.	27:50
Jun 17, 2019	Stealing from the Sick	Alexander Houghton	Solomon Serwanjja		52:34
Jul 1, 2019	Inside Nigeria's Kidnap Crisis		Kunle Falayi		
Jul 12, 2019	Sudan's Livestream Massacre		Benjamin Strick		18:01
Oct 7, 2019	Sex For Grades: Undercover Inside Nigerian And Ghanaian Universities	Charlie Northcott	Kiki Mordi		53:51
Nov 3, 2019	Silicon Valley's Online Slave Market	Jess Kelly			51:00
Dec 16, 2019	Imported For My Body: The African Women Trafficked To India For Sex	Nyasha Kadandara			51:47
Mar 9, 2020	The Trees That Bleed: How Rosewood is Smuggled From Senegal into Gambia	Charlotte Attwood	Umaru Fofana		45:41
Jun 29, 2020	Corona Quacks: Exposing Fake Coronavirus Cures in Ghana	Charlie Northcott	Anas Aremeyaw Anas		27:56
Aug 27, 2020	Libya's 'Game of Drones'		Poline Tchoubar		18:38
Nov 15, 2020	The Baby Stealers	Peter Murimi	Njeri Mwangi		51:30
Jan 24, 2021	Kenya's 'Spy Queen': Private Detective, Jane Mugo	Charlie Northcott	Sharon Machira		27:30
Feb 7, 2021	Lady P and the Sex Work Sisterhood	Tyson Conteh	Tyson Conteh		51:55
May 16, 2021	Nigeria's Ordinary President		Peter Nkanga		26:51
May 30, 2021	Three Killings in Kampala				30:07
Jun 14, 2021	We Make It Or We Die				27:07
Dec 12, 2021	Black Axe: Nigeria's Mafia Cult	Charlie Northcott	Peter Macjob		52:10
Jan 23, 2022	Kenya's Hidden Epidemic	Elijah Kanyi; Dickon Le Marchant	Tom Odula		26:32
Mar 20, 2022	Kenya's Killer Roads	Kassim Mohamed	Richard Chacha		28:00
Jun 13, 2022	Racism for Sale	Chiara Francavilla	Runako Celina; Henry Mhango		49:05
Feb 20, 2023	Sex for Work: The True Cost of Our Tea	Seamus Mirodan	Tom Odula		49:45
Oct 1, 2023	Predators on the Pitch: Inside Africa's Biggest Football Scandal	Suzanne Vanhooymissen	Khadidiatou Cissé		28:04
Nov 26, 2023	Breaking the Silence: Abortion Rights in Kenya	Zoe Flood	Linda Ngari		44:37
Jan 8, 2024	Disciples: The Cult of TB Joshua	Charlie Northcott; Helen Spooner			51:56
Apr 28, 2025	Blood Parliament	Bertram Hill	Runako Celina		37:10
Sep 15, 2025	Death In Dubai: #DubaiPortaPotty	Jamie Welham	Runako Celina		1:04:00
