= NewswireNGR =

Nigeria online news agency

- Telling Under-Reported Stories.
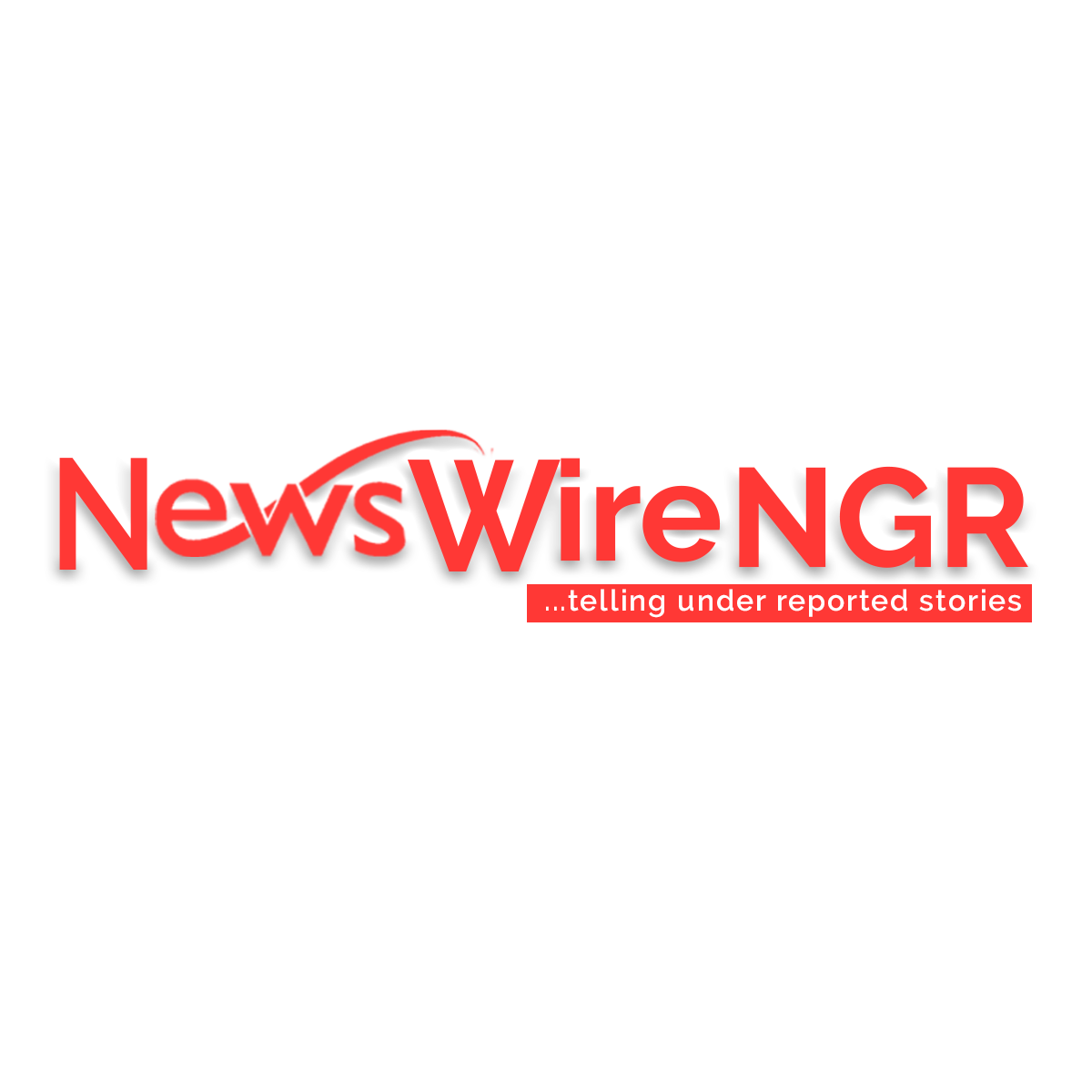
- Type: News agency
- Format: Online
- Founded: 2013
- Language: English
- Headquarters: Lagos, Nigeria
- Website: newswirengr.com

NewsWireNGR is an independent newsroom that reports underreported or mostly ignored stories by mainstream media organisations in Nigeria and Africa. The all women led newsroom was founded in 2013, the remote team, drives conversational journalism that leads to and not limited to high level policy actions by government but influences change and drives social movements in the country.

== Audience reach and impact ==
NewsWireNGR journalism has prompted investigations into misconduct at the Abuja Environmental and Protection Board, shrinking civic and media spaces in Nigeria, the Nigerian Railway Corporation, the Nigerian Ministry of Humanitarian Affairs and its disbursements of COVID-19 intervention funds to mention a few, leading to changes in government policies across the country.

== Funding ==
The platform has previously been supported by the Google News Initiative and the Open Society Initiative for West Africa (OSIWA).

== See also ==
- Corruption in Nigeria
- Media in Nigeria
