= The Arrangements (short story) =

2016 short story by Chimamanda Ngozi Adichie

"The Arrangements" is a 2016 short story by Chimamanda Ngozi Adichie.

== Sources ==
- "An Analysis of Adichie's "The Arrangements"". Brittle Paper. 8 July 2016.
- Garber, Megan (28 June 2016). "The Trump Campaign Just Became Literature". The Atlantic.
- Flood, Alison (29 June 2016). "Chimamanda Ngozi Adichie writes story about Donald Trump's wife Melania". the Guardian.
- Adichie, Chimamanda Ngozi (28 June 2016). "'The Arrangements': A Work of Fiction". The New York Times.
