= Kaduna Book and Arts Festival =

Literary festival in Kaduna State, Nigeria

- Status: Active
- Genre: Arts festival, Book festival
- Frequency: Annually
- Venue: Gusau Institute, Kaduna
- Locations: Kaduna, Kaduna State
- Country: Nigeria
- Inaugurated: 2017
- Organizer: Book Buzz Foundation/Kaduna State Government/Gusau Institute
- Website: www.kabafest.org

Kaduna Book and Arts Festival, also known as KABAFEST, is an annual literary, cultural, and art event in Kaduna State, Nigeria that took place for the first time in July, 2017. It was organized by Book Buzz Foundation, who also organizes the annual Aké Arts and Book Festival, in collaboration with the Kaduna State Government and the Gusau Institute. It was also the first book festival that occurs annually in northern Nigeria.

== Founding ==
There is a perception about Northern Nigeria as a place that is too conservative for books and literature. KABAFEST was conceived - an initiative of the Kaduna State Government, as a way to address that misconception. Of that founding, Lola Shoneyin of Book Buzz says through the festival, she "aim to create new and exciting opportunities for social and cultural interaction, the celebration and promotion of creatives in the Northern region of Nigeria and foster tolerance and understanding through dialogues about books, culture, the arts and society."

== The first edition ==
The first edition of KABAFEST was held at the Gusau Institute in Kaduna State and had five booklogues or conversations, presence of authors, panel discussions, two film screenings, an art exhibition with four Northern Nigerian artists, food- tasting, and a magical poetry performance. It featured over 50 writers, artists, actors, poets and performers from around the world. It was headlined by Sudanese author and first winner of the Caine Prize, Leila Aboulela.

Other writers and artists present included Abdulbasit Abubakar, Abdullah Musa Dona, Abubakar Adam Ibrahim, Aisha Umar, Aminu Alan Waka, Andrew Walker, Auwalu Anwar, Audee T. Giwa, Balaraba Ramat Yakubu, Carmen McCain, Chika Jones, Chitra Nagarajan, Dami Ajayi, E. E Sule, Edify Yakusak, Efe Paul Azino, Fatima A. Umar, Hadiza Isma El-Rufai, Hafsah A. Matazu, Sanusi Lamido Sanusi, Hafsat Ahmad Abdulwaheed, Hauwa Evelyn Shekarau, Ibrahim Bello-Kano, Ishaya Bako, Jamila Umar Tanko, Jerry Buhari, Joseph Hayab, Kadaria Ahmed, Kaltume B. Gana, Kenneth Gyang, Kinna Likimani, Kola Tubosun, Leila Aboulela, Mariam S. Oyawoye, Maryam Bobi, Maryam Awaisu, Maryam Bukar Hassan, Methuselah Jeremiah, Nur'din Busari, Nura Garba, Odafe Atogun, Pearl Osibu, Rahama Sadau, Rahma Abdulmajid Sharif, Richard Ali, Saddiq Dzukogi, Samira Haruna Sanusi, Segun Adeniyi, Saudatu S. Mahdi, Temie Giwa-Tubosun, Titilope Sonuga, Toni Kan, Usman Bugaje, Wana Udobang, Williams Chechet, Zaynab Alkali, Razinat Talatu Mohammed, Abubakar Othman, Jeremiah Gyang.

The festival also featured the screening of two films: Ishaya Bako's Henna and Kenneth Gyang's Blood and Henna. It also had "booklogues", panel discussions, poetry, art exhibition, and a fiction workshop.

== Right to Write ==
A highlight of the festival was the unveiling of the memorandum of understanding, of 'Right to Write Project', a literacy project between the European Union, and a French cultural organisation, Africultures. The aim of the project is "to propagate massive literary and digital projects in five states in the North – Kaduna, Katsina, Borno, Adamawa and Bauchi." The project is worth EUR 3 million.

== Hausa Language Prize/Residency ==
Another highlight of the festival was the announcement of a five hundred thousand naira Prize for Hausa Literature, and a residency for writers writing in the language.

== Annual event ==
The festival was declared an annual event by the governor of Kaduna State, Mallam Nasir el-Rufai.
