= Wreaths for a Wayfarer =

2021 poem collection

Wreaths for a Wayfarer: An Anthology in Honour of Pius Adesanmi
- Cover for the North American edition
- Editors: Uche Umez; Nduka Otiono
- Cover artist: Victor Ehikhamenor; Ochi Ogbuaku
- Language: English
- Subject: Tribute
- Genre: Elegy poetry
- Published: 2020
- Publisher: Daraja Press, Narrative Landscape Press
- Publication place: Canada, Nigeria
- Media type: Print (paperback), e-Book
- Pages: 328
- ISBN: 9781988832333

Wreaths for a Wayfarer: An Anthology in Honour of Pius Adesanmi is a 2020 collection of poems edited by Uche Peter Umez and Nduka Otiono in honour of Pius Adesanmi (1972–2019). It was published by Daraja Press in North America and Narrative Landscape Press in Nigeria.

== Development ==
Adesanmi died on 10 March 2019, when Ethiopian Airlines Flight 302 from Addis Ababa to Nairobi crashed shortly after take-off. He was on his way to an African Union conference.

Following his death, a call was submission was made open which 267 poems from poets around the world. The collection was in reference to the first book The Wayfarer and Other Poems published by Adesanmi in 2001.

In 2020, The anthology was edited by Nduka Otiono and Uche Peter Umezurike and published by Jarada Press in Canada and Narrative Landscape Press in January.

== Content ==
The anthology had an introit by Niyi Osundare, an introduction by Nduka Otiono and a foreword by Odia Ofeimun. The book is divided into four parts in total.

=== Part I. Wayfarer ===
- "Scabha or The Sliding Door Operator" — Sihle Ntuli
- "When an Iroko Falls" — Iquo DianaAbasi
- "How to Survive War in Nigeria" — Iquo DianaAbasi
- "I Wet the Earth, I Sing You Wreaths…" — Fareed Agyakwah
- "Harvest IV" — Funmi Aluko
- "Wayfarer" — Funmi Aluko
- "The Wayfarer" — Saudat Salawudeen
- "End of Forever" — Saudat Salawudeen
- "Muse of Homecoming" — Justus K. S. Makokha
- "Encore" — Agatha Agema
- "Now that I know young birds die in flight" — Segun Michael Olabode
- "The Water-Pot is Broke" — Susan Bukky Badeji
- "From absence, memory and farther" — Obemata
- "Umbilicals" — Tijah Bolton-Akpan
- "The Pilgrim Unbound" — Clara Ijeoma Osuji
- "Eclipsed at Noon" — Abdulaziz Abdulaziz
- "To the Daughters" — Abdulaziz Abdulaziz
- "The Traveler" — Abiodun Bello
- "For the Wayfarer" — Chifwanti Zulu
- "The Acts of Brother" — 'Bunmi Ogungbe
- "Backing His Daughter: For Pius, on Facebook" — Jane Bryce
- "Avoiding Sunlight" — Unoma Azuah
- "Akáṣọléri (Mourners)" — Kola Tubosun
- "Last Tweets" — Kọ́lá Túbọ̀sún
- "Farewell, Wayfarer" — Oyinkansade Fabikun
- "Solitaire" — Kafilat Oloyede
- "How to Keep the Wake for a Shooting Star" — Chuma Nwokolo
- "Eagle" — Uzo Odonwodo
- "In Memoriam" — Uzo Odonwodo
- "Can You Do This Thing?" — Sarah Katz-Lavigne
- "Lights" — John Chizoba Vincent
- "The Meteorite" — Omowumi Olabode Steven Ekundayo
- "Black Box" — Ian Keteku
- "Paramour of the Pen" — Abraham Tor
- "Flying Coffin" — James Onyebụchi Nnaji
- "Looking for the Dead" — James Onyebụchi Nnaji
- "The Eagle Perched" — Moses Ogunleye
- "A Pius Flight" — Kennedy Emetulu
- "Kwanza for Pius" — Ifesinachi Nwadike
- "Dream-mare" — Nidhal Chami
- "A Walk in the Graveyard" — Chimeziri C. Ogbedeto
- "Payo" — Biko Agozino
- "Iku" — Peter Olamakinde Olapegba
- "He left" — Amatoritsero Ede
- "Spousal Loss" — Peter Olamakinde Olapegba
- "The Face of My Savior is the Ordinary Moment" —Gloria Nwizu
- "Denouement" — Gloria Nwizu
- "A Conversation between Two Young Cousins" — Ethel Ngozi Okeke
- "Sunday Flight" — Emman Usman Shehu
- "Departure" — Ivor Agyeman-Duah
- "The Count" — Uthpala Dishani Senaratne
- "Rude Shock" — Olajide Salawu
- "Saturday 12:56" — Ludwidzi M. K. Mainza
- "Daughter" — Ludwidzi M. K. Mainza
- "Tough Love" — Nnorom Azuonye
- "In the Midst of it All, I am…" — Anushya Ramakrishna
- "Haiku" – Ai-Ku
- "Immortality" — Adesanya Adewale Adeshina
- "He Rose" — Adesanya Adewale Adeshina
- "A Singing Bird" — Adesanya Adewale Adeshina
- "Arrivant" — Akua Lezli Hope
- "EarthWork Sestina" — Akua Lezli Hope
- "Animalia, Chordata, Mammalia, Proboscidea" — Akua Lezli Hope
- "Poem of Relief: When Your Sadness is Alive" — Kennedy Hussein Aliu
- "If I Seek" — Kennedy Hussein Aliu
- "When You Ask me About my Teacher" — Kennedy Hussein Aliu and Leyda Jocelyn Estrada Arellano
- "The Eagle is not the Quills and Talons" — Olumide Olaniyan
- "Without a farewell" — Nduka Otiono
- "After the Funeral" — Nduka Otiono
- "Fugitives from the Violence of Truth" — Efe Paul Azino
- "Just but a Journey" — Sam Dennis Otieno

=== Part II. Requiems ===
- "Elegy for Pius" — Helon Habila
- "This Exodus Has Birthed a Song" — Echezonachukwu Nduka
- "Where to find you: a requiem" — Echezonachukwu Nduka
- "Blown" — Richard Inya
- "Words melt in his mouth" — Peter Midgley
- "Requiem for the Fallen / Mogaka o ole" — Lebogang Disele
- "To Our Hero: Rest in Peace" — Lebogang Disele
- "What Shall We Do to Death?" — Winlade Israel
- "A Star Just Fell "— Winlade Israel
- "Requiem" — Peter Akinlabi
- "Requiem for Pius" — Rasaq Malik
- "Wayfarer" — Rasaq Malik Gbolahan
- "Twirling the Beads of Grief…" — Tade Aina
- "Say me Rebellion" — Kingsley L. Madueke
- "When this Calabash Breaks" — Kingsley L. Madueke
- "Requiem for the Wayfarer" — Adesina Ajala
- "Song of Sorrow" — Soji Cole
- "Planting Season" — Anote Ajeluorou
- "For Our Departed Bard" — Maria Ajima
- "Memory of Tear" — Joshua Agbo
- "Why?" — Margaret Wairimu Waweru
- "Letter to Dad" — Margaret Wairimu Waweru
- "Missing Voices" — Ugochukwu P. Nwafor
- "Tears on Canvas" — Wesley Macheso
- "Nausea" — Wesley Macheso
- "This Easter" — Wesley Macheso
- "When I Am Gone" — Maryam Ali Ali
- "Nothing Has Changed" — Maryam Ali Ali
- "Protest" — Ejiofor Ugwu
- "Our Voice is Gone" — Janet James Ibukun
- "Agadaga Iroko / Giant Iroko" — Sunny Iyke U. Okeigwe
- "This Poetry" — James Tar Tsaaior
- "The Passing of Pius" — Uzor Maxim Uzoatu
- "Light Dims to Shine Forever" — Akachi Adimora-Ezeigbo
- "You Bled Africa!" — Mitterand Okorie
- "To the Muse of Isanlu: A Salute" — 'BioDun J. Ogundayo
- "You remain with us" — Nkateko Masinga
- "A Bit of Narcissism" — Okwudili Nebeolisa
- "Bereavement" — Okwudili Nebeolisa
- "Dirge for the Departed" — Koye-Ladele Mofehintoluwa
- "If Only" — Femi Abidogun
- "Falling Birds" — Yusuff Abdulbasit
- "Immortality" — Yusuff Abdulbasit
- "Harvest of Deaths" — Yemi Atanda
- "The Horse and the Tortoise" — Yemi Atanda
- "The Chorus Is Death" — Ubaka Ogbogu
- "Breaking Bread" — Obiwu
- "Still They Hunt for Emmett Till" — Obiwu
- "On wisdom's wings" — Jumoke Verissimo

=== Part III. Homecoming ===
- "The Indent (For Pius)" — Uche Nduka
- "When the sun sets" — Adejumo Uthman Ajibola
- "Aridunun Akowe" — Dahunsi Ayobami
- "Pius: Myth, Mystic, Mystery" — Tenibegi Karounwi
- "Returning the Light as Wreath" — Ndubuisi Martins
- "Naija is a Badly-Behaved Poem" — Ndubuisi Martins
- "Confessions of a Gypsy" — Richard Kayode O. James
- "When the Pious Die" — Uchenna-Franklin Ekweremadu
- "Song of the Pilgrim" — Obinna Chukwudi Ibezim
- "Pius, the Seed" — Celina O. Aju-Ameh
- "Cloud Coffin" — Tola Ijalusi
- "Letter to My Father" — Ololade Akinlabi Ige
- "I Journey Quietly Home" — Martin Ijir
- "Hopeful People" — Ndaba Siban
- "Explaining My Depression to You" — Yusuf Taslemat Taiwo
- "The Broken Quill" — Nathanael Tanko Noah
- "We do not know how to carry this pain" — Edaki Timothy. O
- "Stars, Out" — S. Su'eddie Vershima Agema
- "Converging Skies and Shadows" — S. Su'eddie Vershima Agema
- "Will You?" — Biodun Bamgboye
- "Farewell" — Maryam Gatawa
- "Transit to Kenya" — Anthony Enyone Ohiemi
- "Abiku Agba" — Usman Oladipo Akanbi
- "Evening Bird" — Bayowa Ayomide Micheal
- "Withered Green" — Augustine Ogechukwu Nwulia
- "Home Call…047" — Onuchi Mark Onoruoiza
- "Outshining the Stars" — Onuchi Mark Onoruoiza
- "The Eagle Has Fallen" — Manasseh Gowk
- "Farewell" — Manasseh Gowk
- "Death" — Khalid Imam
- "The Flood" — Khalid Imam
- "Blue Skies" — Yejide Kilanko
- "This Very Goodbye" — Nseabasi S. J. King
- "The Deserted Road or Elegy for Pius Adesanmi" — Daniel Olaoluwa Whyte
- "What My Father Said on His Death Bed" — Gbenga Adesina
- "Wayfarer" — James Yeku
- "One Meets Two" — James Yeku
- "First Goodbye" — D. M. Aderibigbe
- "Monster" — Afam Akeh
- "Where you are now" — Raphael d'Abdon
- "When the Curtains Fall" — Uche Peter Umezurike

=== Part IV. A Selection from Pius Adesanmi's The Wayfarer and Other Poems ===
- "The Wayfarer" — Pius Adesanmi
- "Ah, Prometheus!" — Pius Adesanmi
- "Odia Ofeimun: The Brooms Take Flight" — Pius Adesanmi
- "To the Unfathomable One" — Pius Adesanmi
- "Message from Aso Rock to a Poet in Exile" — Pius Adesanmi
- "Entries" — Pius Adesanmi
