= Aké Arts and Book Festival =

Annual literary event in Nigeria

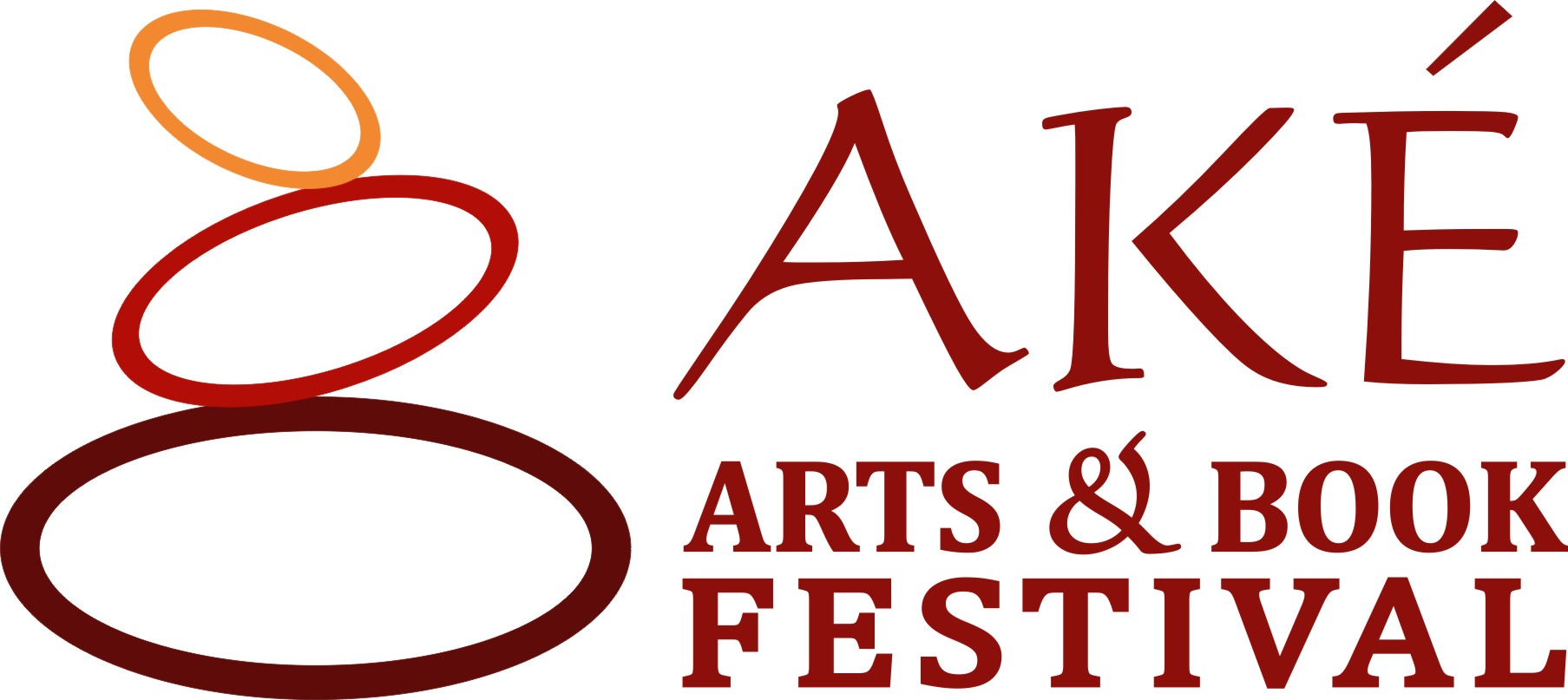
- Status: Active
- Genre: Arts festival, book festival
- Frequency: Annually
- Venue: Cultural Centre, Kuto
- Locations: Abeokuta, Ogun State
- Country: Nigeria
- Inaugurated: 2013; 13 years ago
- Organizer: Book Buzz Foundation/Lola Shoneyin
- Website: www.akefestival.org

The Aké Arts and Book Festival is a literary and artistic event held annually in Nigeria. It was founded in 2013 by Lola Shoneyin, a Nigerian writer and poet, in Abeokuta. It features new and established writers from across the world, and its primary focus has been to promote, develop, and celebrate the creativity of African writers, poets, and artists. The Aké Arts and Book Festival has been described as the African continent's biggest annual gathering of literary writers, editors, critics, and readers. The festival has an official website and a dedicated magazine, known as the Aké Review.

== Founding of the festival ==
Lola Shoneyin founded the festival because, according to her, she "wanted a place where intellectuals and thinkers can come together and talk about African issues on African soil".

The festival is named after Aké, a town in Abeokuta, Ogun State, where Africa's first Nobel Laureate in Literature, Wole Soyinka, was born in 1934.

== First edition (2013) ==
The first edition of the festival was held at the Cultural Centre in Kuto, Abeokuta, 19–24 November 2013. The theme of the festival was "The Shadow of Memory". One of its major highlights was an event where four Nigerians under the age of 21 had the opportunity to quiz the Nobel Laureate Wole Soyinka on his life.

== Second edition (2014) ==
The second edition of the festival was held from 18 November to 22 November 2014. The theme was "Bridges and Pathways". The festival was held at the Cultural Centre in Kuto, Abeokuta. It was organized in collaboration with the Ogun State Government, Access Bank, Etisalat Nigeria, and Annoying Logo. The programme featured nine book chats with authors including Yejide Kilanko, Bernardine Evaristo, Okey Ndibe, Nnedi Okorafor, Chude Jideonwo, and many others.

== Third edition (2015) ==
The 2015 festival, themed "Engaging the Fringe", was held between 17 November and 21 November of that year, and had more than 80 writers, visual and performing artistes, researchers, and scholars from around the world in attendance. The official opening ceremony was held on 18 November 2016, and featured speeches from the Executive Governor of Ogun State Ibikunle Amosun, European Union Ambassador to Nigeria and ECOWAS Michel Arrion, as well as Baji Nyam of Marine Platforms.

The festival was headlined by the poet Niyi Osundare, who was also on the cover of that year's edition of the Aké Review. Other notable writers at the festival included Helon Habila, Binyavanga Wainaina, Mona Elthahawy, Chris Abani, Véronique Tadjo, Pierre Cherruau, E. C. Osondu, Taiye Selasi, Novuyo Rosa Tshuma, and Nnedi Okorafor.

The edition featured exhibitions of photographs titled Margins and Marginalisation by Andrew Esiebo and Shadows and Dreams by Tyna Adebowale. Hear Word, a play directed by Ifeoma Fafunwa, was also performed at the event.

== Fourth edition (2016) ==
The theme of the 2016 edition, held 15–19 November, was "Beneath this Skin". The festival was headlined by the Kenyan writer Ngũgĩ wa Thiong'o.

It featured several art exhibitions, including Cultural Dysmorphia by Ayobola Kekere-Ekun and Bits of Borno by Fatima Abubakar. It also featured a play, Iyalode of Eti, adapted for the stage by Debo Oluwatuminu and directed by Moji Kareem and Femi Elufowoju Jr. The play was inspired by John Webster's masterpiece The Duchess of Malfi. There was also a musical concert with Brymo, Adunni Nefretiti, and Falana performing on stage at the event.

The Festival Film was Hissène Habré, A Chadian Tragedy by Mahamat-Saleh Haroun. The screening was followed by an interview with Clément Abaifouta, president of the Chadian Victim's Association, which fought to bring Hissène Habré to justice. Abaifouta was arrested in 1985 by Habre's notorious political police force, which suspected him of having links to the opposition of the president.

== Fifth edition (2017) ==
The theme of the 2017 edition, held 14–18 November 2017, was "This F-Word". The headliner was the Ghanaian novelist and poet Ama Ata Aidoo. This edition featured several events, including the launch of Saraba magazine's inaugural print issue and the presentation of prizes for the Nommo Awards.

== Sixth edition (2018) ==
The theme of the 2018 edition was "Fantastical Futures", which focused on events and conversations on the ideal future of Africa. For the first time since 2013, Ake Festival was held in Lagos, 25–28 October 2018, at the Radisson Blu Hotel, Ikeja. The 2018 Festival celebrated Africa's art in photography and art exhibitions of young African artists like Abdulkareem Baba, Eloghosa Osunde, Isma'il Shomala, and Roye Okupe.

== Seventh edition (2019) ==
The seventh edition was themed "Black Bodies and Grey Matter". It featured about 120 guests, over 500 attendees, seventeen panel discussions, twelve book chats, one art exhibition, Eat The Book, and the launch of Waterbirds on the Lakeshore, an African young adult anthology by the Goethe-Institut (published by Ouida Books).

== Eighth edition (2020) ==
The eighth edition of the festival, themed "African Time", took place in Lagos, 22–25 October 2020, and was held online due to the COVID-19 pandemic. The festival featured Wana Udobong, a Nigerian poet, and included performances from talented poets from South Africa, Nigeria, Ghana, Senegal, Jamaica, the United Kingdom, Uganda, Senegal, Sudan, Kenya, and Algeria. The poets in attendance at the 2020 edition include Jubir Malick, Vanessa Kissule, Titilope Sonuga, D'bi Young Anitafrika, Samira Negrouche, Ndukwe Onuoha, Sitawa Nawahe, Yomi Sode, Poetra Asantawa, Vangile Gantsho, Afura Kan, and Ola Elhassan.

During the festival, a documentary was shown in honor of Maryse Condé, titled The Wondrous Life of Maryse Condé. Condé is the author of numerous novels and a distinguished academic; she retired from Columbia University as a professor of French language. She also taught at the University of California, Berkeley, and UCLA. There was also panel discussion centered around the responsibility of the media to tackle disinformation. The panel was chaired by Yinka Adegoke, and its members were Yemisi Akinbobola, Wale Lawal, and Chude Jideonwo, who spoke on "The Media and Their Duty to Africa's Youth".

== Ninth edition (2021) ==
The theme of the ninth festival was "Generational Discordance" and took place 28–30 October 2021. The 2021 festival was held virtually. Its panel discussions focused on African crime writing, conspiracy theories and healthcare, and disability rights, with the latter moderated by Nancy Adimora. Some of the book conversations were Formation: The Making of Nigeria from Jihad to Amalgamation by Fola Fagbule and Feyi Fawehinmi; Butter Honey Pig Bread by Francesca Ekwuyasi; Born in Blackness by New York Times columnist Howard W. French, When the Sky is Ready The Stars Will Appear by E.C. Osondu and The Sex Lives of African Women by Nana Dorkoa Sekyiamah; and The Teller of Secrets by Bisi Adjapon.

== Tenth edition (2022) ==
The tenth edition of the Ake Arts and Book Festival was held in Lagos as a celebration of art and culture, featuring prominent writers and other distinguished guests. It included authors such as Abdulrazak Gurnah, Aiwanose Odafen, Nana Darkoa Sekyiamah, Chimeka Garricks, Toni Kan, Nnedi Okorafor, Francesca Ekwuyasi, Jennifer Nansubuga Makumbi, Tendai Huchu, and others. The festival's theme was "Homecoming" and it was sponsored by Sterling Bank and the Book Buzz Foundation.

The festival was held from 24 to 26 November 2022. It featured book chats, panel discussions, readings, workshops, roundtable discussions, performances, and stage plays. The first day was headlined by Véronique Tadjo, while the second day began with a panel discussion titled "Sauuti: The Making of a Shared World of African Science Fiction." The third and final day concluded with additional panel discussions and other activities.

== Eleventh edition (2023) ==
The theme for the eleventh edition was "Blood Ties," focusing on family dynamics, relationships, loss, and unity. The festival was held at the BON Hotel Ikeja Residence in GRA, Lagos. For its eleventh edition, the festival partnered with Sterling Bank and Laminate. In 2023, it was reported that more than 1,000 writers, poets, musicians, actors, filmmakers, artists, and thinkers had participated in the festival since its inception.

The festival featured authors including Petina Gappah, Wole Talabi, Bolu Babalola, Bisi Adjapon, Abubakar Adam Ibrahim, Irene Muchemi-Ndiritu, and others. The program included the Africa Rights Forum, panel discussions, film screenings, the Palmwine & Poetry Night, concerts, and other events.

== Twelfth edition (2024) ==
The festival edition was held in Lagos from 20 to 23 November, with the theme “Finding Freedom.” It featured writers and guests from Nigeria, Ghana, Côte d’Ivoire, South Africa, Uganda, Kenya, the United Kingdom, Colombia, the United States, and several other countries. Participating writers included Wole Soyinka, Jennifer Nansubuga Makumbi, Abi Daré, Ainehi Edoro, Ayọ̀wánfẹ́ Odafen, Karen Attiah, Nnedi Okorafor, and many others. The press conference was held at Ouida Bookstore.

The year's edition featured 24 events, including panel discussions, book chats, a comedy show, a book quiz, film screenings, and poetry performances. Its theme reflected ongoing struggles in Palestine, the Democratic Republic of the Congo, Ukraine, and other parts of the world.

== Thirteenth edition (2025) ==
In 2025, the theme of the Ake Arts and Book Festival was "Reclaiming Truth." The festival was held from 20 to 22 November 2025 and was headlined by Bernardine Evaristo. It featured prominent guests, including Tunde Onakoya, Tolu Ogunlesi, Colombe Schneck, Myroslav Laiuk, Fatima Bala, and others.

The three-day festival featured a range of literary activities and was held in partnership with Sterling Bank, the Lagos State Government, and the Open Society Foundations. It brought together a diverse range of creatives, including authors, poets, filmmakers, musicians, artists, storytellers, thinkers, and many others.

== Fourteenth edition (2026) ==
The fourteenth edition of the Ake Arts and Book Festival is scheduled to be held in Lagos from 19 to 21 November 2026. The edition will continue to be organized by the Book Buzz Foundation, a non-profit organization founded by Lola Shoneyin.

== The Aké Review ==
The Aké Review is the official publication of the festival. It is published in three official languages: English, Yorùbá, and French.

The 2014 Review was co-edited by Oyebade Dosunmu and Lola Shoneyin.

The 2015 Review was co-edited by Kola Tubosun and Kolade Arogundade. Each edition features a series of 10 questions answered by Aké Festival guests. In addition, the publication has interviews, short fiction, poetry, photography, and art. In the 2015 edition of the Aké Review, there was an in-depth interview with the poet and teacher Niyi Osundare, who also appeared on the cover, as well as an interview with the 2015 Caine Prize-winner Namwali Serpell.

The 2016 Review was edited by Molara Wood. Its cover featured the famous Kenyan writer Ngũgĩ was Thiong'o, who was also a headliner at the festival. It included interviews with Ngugi (conducted by Mọlara Wood), Mahamat Saleh Haroun, and Odafe Atogun (both conducted by Lola Shoneyin).

The 2017 Review was edited by Molara Wood, with the headliner of that year's event Ama Ata Aidoo on the cover. It included three interviews: Diane Awerbuck interviewed by Geoff Ryman, Ama Ata Aidoo interviewed by Molara Wood, and Ayobami Adebayo interviewed by Kola Tubosun. There was also an uncredited interview with Jude Kelly, artistic director of London's Southbank Centre and a founder of the Women of the World Festival (WOW).

The 2018 Review was edited by Molara Wood, and featured that year's festival headliner Nuruddin Farah on the cover.

The 2019 Review, edited by Molara Wood, had Tsitsi Dangarembga on the cover. It also included an interview with Tsitsi Dangarembga who was the headliner that year.
