= Yagba East =

- LGA
- Interactive map of Yagba East
- Location in Nigeria
- Coordinates: 8°10′N 5°42′E
- Country: Nigeria
- State: Kogi State
- Headquarter: Isanlu

Government
  - Local Government Chairman: Dare Joshua Venza

Area
  - Total: 1,396 km^{2} (539 sq mi)

Population (2006 census)
  - Total: 140,150
  - Density: 100.4/km^{2} (260.0/sq mi)
- Time zone: UTC+1 (WAT)
- 3-digit postal code prefix: 262
- ISO 3166 code: NG.KO.YE

Yagba East is a Local Government Area in Kogi State, Nigeria. Its headquarters is in the town of Isanlu on the A123 highway, and is populated mainly by the Yagba/ekiti people.

It had an area of 1,396 km^{2} and a population of 140,150 during the 2006 census. By 2016, the population grew to 199,300.

The postal code of the area is 262102.

== Climate condition ==
Yagba East, like nearby Yagba West, is in the tropical savanna climate belt — warm year-round with a lengthy rainy season from about April to October and a dry, relatively dustier Harmattan season from November to March. Seasonal rainfall is concentrated in the mid-rainy months and humidity rises markedly during that period.

== Notable people ==
- Pius Adesanmi
- Grace Oyelude
- HRH Oba Moses Babatunde Etombi
- Karim Sunday Steve
- Jimoh Musa
- Leke Abejide
- Jide Omokore
- Juwon Lawal, founder of Crestal Group

== Town and Villages in Yagba East ==
- Iddo
- Idofin
- Ijowa
- Ilafin
- Irunda
- Isanlu-Itedo
- Isanlu-Makutu
- Isanlu-Mopo
- Iye
- Lofin
- Odogbe
- Agi
- Aginmi-Isale
- Aginmi-Oke
- Aiyede
- Aiyegunde-Oke
- Aiyegunle-Okeagi
- Alu
- Ejuku
- Ife-Olukotun
- Igbagun
- Igbo-Ero
- Ilai
- Imela
- Isao
- Jege
- Odo-Amu
- Okeagi
- Oranre
- Ponyan
- Takete- Isao
- Source -
