= ISAV =

ISAV may refer to:

- Salmon isavirus
- Institut Supérieur Agro-Vétérinaire, now the Faculty of Agronomic and Veterinary Science at Loyola University of Congo

== See also ==
- Isau (disambiguation)
- Esau, the Biblical figure
