= Kekere =

Kekere is both a given name and a surname. Notable people with the name include:

- Kekere Moukailou (born 1992), Ivorian footballer
- Eletu Kekere, Yoruba monarch
- Ayobola Kekere-Ekun, Nigerian artist
- Kudirat Kekere-Ekun (born 1958), Nigerian jurist
