= Isau =

Isau may refer to:

- Iranian Students Association in the United States (ISAU)
- Longan, in some places locally known as isau, a fruit-producing tree
- Ralf Isau, German writer
- Saka Isau, Nigerian lawyer and politician

== See also ==
- Isao, a Japanese name
- Esau, a Biblical figure
