= Iquo DianaAbasi =

Nigerian author, storyteller, performance poet, social activist and editor.

Iquo DianaAbasi is a Nigerian writer, creative writer, and performance poet, author of Symphony of Becoming and a number of other collections. She was longlisted for the Nigeria Prize for Literature in 2022 for her work Coming Undone as Stitches Tighten. She has also been shortlisted for the Wole Soyinka Prize for Literature and Association of Nigerian Authors Poetry Prize.

== Bio ==
DianaAbasi was born in Uyo, the capital of Akwa Ibom state. She has lived in Lagos since she was four. She has an MFA in creative writing from the University of Alabama Her work spans poetry on the page and public performances inspired by her Ibibio roots. She has also released a poetry album. She has performed at the Lagos International Poetry Festival, Ake Arts and Book Festival, Lagos Black Heritage Festival, The Macmillan Literary night, among others.

Her latest work Èfọ́ Rírò & Other Stories is a collection of stories described as a work “about a range of characters: frustrated women, errant spouses, vanished spouses, callous lovers, village gossips, unlikely knights in shining armour, corporate executives, medical doctors, and a lesson teacher who is taught a less he will never forget.” Chuma Nwokolo calls the work "...seasoned tales, with punchlines to surprise even the jaded."

== Collections ==
- Ẹ̀fọ́ Rírò & Other Stories (fiction) -- 2020
- Coming Undone as Stitches Tighten (Poetry) -- 2022
- Beyond the Staccato, a poetry album—2022
- Symphony of Becoming (poetry) -- 2013
