= Efe Paul Azino =

Nigerian writer

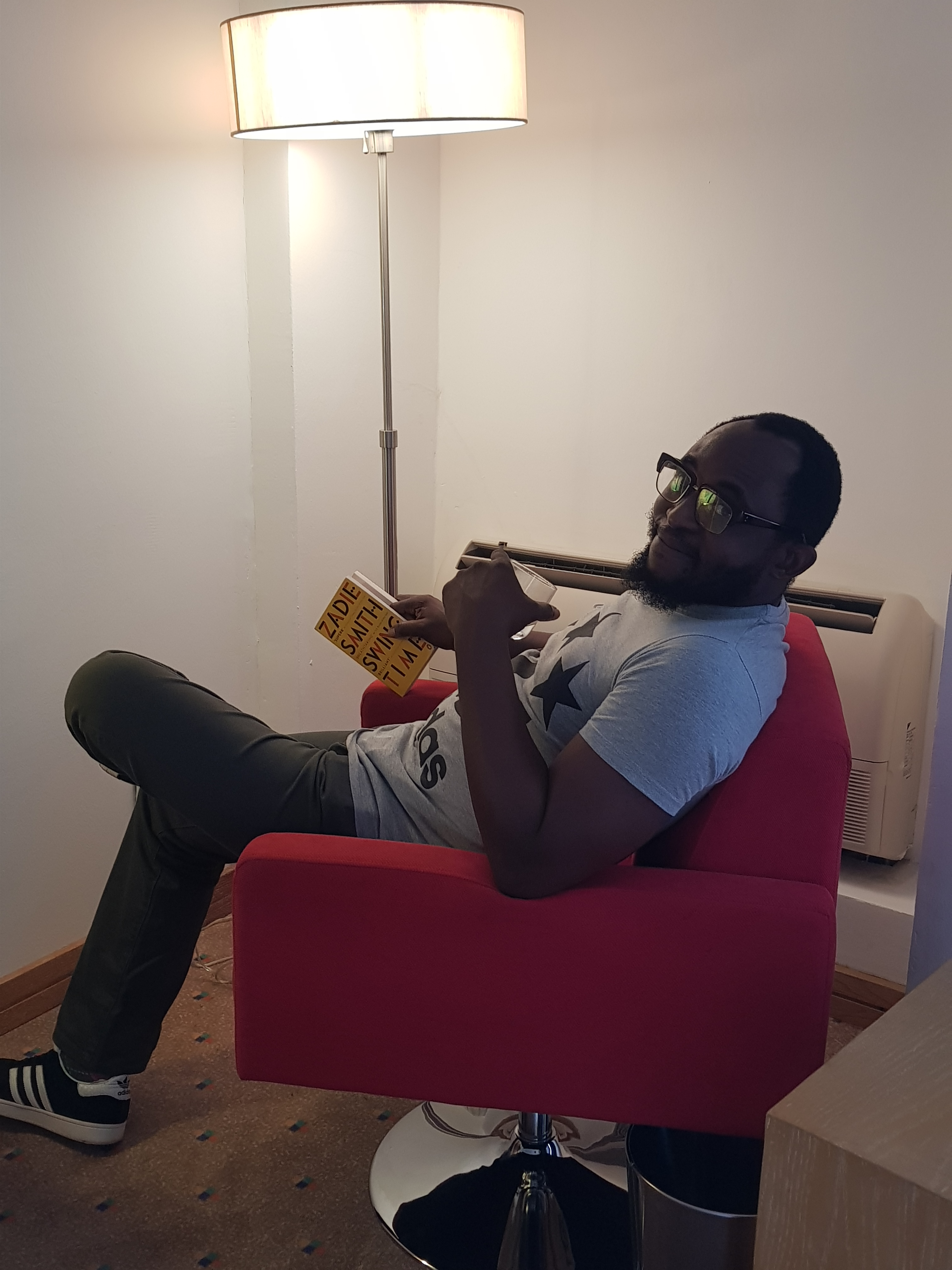
- Born: Lagos State, Nigeria
- Education: Lagos State University
- Occupations: Writer, poet, performer
- Employer: Creative Africa
- Organization: Lagos Poetry Festival

Efe Paul Azino born in Lagos is a Nigerian writer, performance artist and poet, regarded "as one of Nigeria's leading performance poets." He has also been regarded as one who has "played a pivotal part in lifting the words from the page and giving them life" in the Nigerian spoken word performance space.

He is the founder and director of the Lagos International Poetry Festival, and the director of poetry at the annual Lagos Book and Art Festival.

== Biography and work history ==
Azino was born in Lagos, Nigeria. He has featured in a number of local and international poetry events like Aké Arts and Book Festival, Kaduna Book and Arts Festival, Lagos Book and Art Festival, Johannesburg Arts Festival, Lights Camera Africa Film Festival, the Berlin Poetry Festival, Spier International Poetry Festival Cape Town, Taipei Poetry Festival, and The British Council Festival, Lagos. He is a fellow of the Osiwa Poetry Residency.

He is the producer of the spoken word poetry theater production Finding Home, a production that "explores the question of identity, displacement and African international migration".

His poems have been translated into Afrikaans, French, German, and Mandarin.

In 2015, he published his first collection of poetry titled For Broken Men Who Cross Often, published by Farafina Books. His second poetry collection, The Tragedy of Falling with Laughter Stuck in Your Throat, was published in 2019.

In 2017 Azino was named as one of "the most powerful young persons under the age of 40 who are getting things done in the culture space" by YNaija magazine.

== Lagos International Poetry Festival ==
In 2015, Azino founded the Lagos International Poetry Festival (LIPFEST), an annual event of poetry, performance, and conversations, described as "a roll call of wordsmiths, artists, poetry merchants and deep-thinkers". The 2017 edition was themed "Bridges from Walls".
