= Pius Adesanmi =

Nigerian-born Canadian professor (1972–2019)

Pius Adésanmí
- Born: Pius Adebola Adesanmi; 27 February 1972; Isanlu, Kogi State, Nigeria
- Died: 10 March 2019 (aged 47) near Bishoftu, Ethiopia
- Education: Titcombe College Egbe; University of Ilorin (BA); University of Ibadan (Ma); University of British Columbia (PhD)
- Occupations: Academic; author

Pius Adebola Adesanmi (27 February 1972 – 10 March 2019) was a Nigerian-born Canadian academic and author. He was the author of Naija No Dey Carry Last, a 2015 collection of satirical essays. Adesanmi died on 10 March 2019, when Ethiopian Airlines Flight 302 crashed shortly after take-off.

== Biography ==
Adesanmi was born in Isanlu, in Yagba East local government area of Kogi State, Nigeria. He earned a Bachelor of Arts in French language from the University of Ilorin in 1992, a Master's degree in French from the University of Ibadan in 1998, and a PhD in French Studies from the University of British Columbia, Canada, in 2002. Adesanmi was a Fellow of the French Institute for Research in Africa (IFRA) from 1993 to 1997, and of the French Institute of South Africa (IFAS) in 1998 and 2000.

From 2002 to 2005, he was assistant professor of Comparative Literature at the Pennsylvania State University. In 2006, he joined Carleton University, in Ottawa, Canada, as a professor of Literature and African Studies. He was the director of the university's Institute of African Studies until his death.

For many years, Adesanmi was a regular columnist for Premium Times and Sahara Reporters. His writings were often satiric, focusing on the absurd in the Nigerian social and political system. His targets often included politicians, pastors, and other relevant public figures. In September 2015, his scathing column on the decision of the Emir of Kano, Lamido Sanusi, to take an underage wife generated substantial conversation on the matter, and even got the response of the Emir who responded to Adesanmi by name.

In 2015, he gave a TED talk titled "Africa is the forward that the world needs to face".

== Death ==
On 10 March 2019, Adesanmi was among passengers Ethiopian Airlines Flight 302 from Addis Ababa to Nairobi crashed shortly after take-off with no survivors. He was on his way to an African Union conference.

== Legacy ==
Following his death, a collection of poetry with 267 poems from writers around the world, titled Wreaths for a Wayfarer in reference to the first book published by Adesanmi in 2001, was published in his honour by Daraja Press. The anthology was edited by Nduka Otiono and Uche Peter Umezurike.

== Books ==
- The Wayfarer and Other Poems (Oracle Books, Lagos; 2001)
- You're Not a Country, Africa (Penguin Books; 2011)
- Naija No Dey Carry Last (Parrésia Publishers; 2015)
- Who Owns the Problem? Africa and the Struggle for Agency (Michigan State University Press; 2020).

== Awards ==
- In 2001, Adesanmi's first book, The Wayfarer and Other Poems, won the Association of Nigerian Authors' Poetry Prize.
- In 2010, his book You're not a Country, Africa (Penguin Books, 2011), a collection of essays, won the inaugural Penguin Prize for African Writing in the nonfiction category.
- In 2017, Adesanmi was a recipient of Canada Bureau of International Education Leadership Award.
