= Titcombe College Egbe =

Secondary school in Egbe, Nigeria

Titcombe College is a secondary school in Egbe, Kogi State, Nigeria. Founded by missionaries of the Sudan Interior Mission in 1951, the school has produced notable Nigerians including the former Chief of Naval Staff, Vice Admiral Samuel Afolayan and the late Professor Pius Adesamni. Alumni association of the college has commissioned several projects on the campus.

== History ==
Titcombe College was founded in March 1951 by missionaries of the Sudan Interior Mission.

== Alumni ==
The college has produced students who are among notable Nigerians today. Few of them include the former Chief of Naval Staff, Vice Admiral Samuel Afolayan (retd.), Air Vice Marshall Idi Musa, Chief of Defence Intelligence (1995-1999). Professor of Management Science at the University of Ibadan Solomon Adebola, the Chairman of the Central Planning Committee (CPC) Tunji Arosanyin and the late social commentator and university lecturer Pius Adesamni, a Professor of Literature and African studies at Carleton University, Ottawa, Canada and the director of the University's Institute of African Studies. Adesamni died along with 156 others, on the ill-fated Ethiopian Airlines jet that crashed March 2019. With a robust alumni, several sets of Titcombe College have been giving back to the college.
