= Ife-Olukotun =

Village in Yagba East, Kogi State, Nigeria

Ife-Olukotun Ìfẹ̀-Ọlùkótun
- Village
- Location in Nigeria
- Coordinates: 8°05′24″N 5°43′48″E
- Country: Nigeria
- State: Kogi State
- LGA: Yagba East
- Founded: Pre-colonial era

Government
  - Type: Traditional monarchy
  - Traditional ruler: Oba (Obajema of Ife-Olukotun)
- Elevation: 420 m (1,380 ft)
- No official census data available for the village alone
- Time zone: UTC+1 (WAT)
- Postal code: 262102
- ISO 3166 code: NG.KO.YE

Ife-Olukotun (also spelt Ife Olukotun or Ìfẹ̀-Ọlùkótun in Yoruba) is a rural Yoruba village in Yagba East Local Government Area of Kogi State, north-central Nigeria. It is one of the principal Yagba/Ekiti-Yoruba settlements in the Yagba-speaking region and belongs to the historical Olukotun clan group.

== History ==
Ife-Olukotun traces its origin to the ancient Yoruba migration waves from Ile-Ife, the spiritual homeland of the Yoruba people. Oral tradition holds that the founders were part of the princely lineage that dispersed from Ile-Ife centuries ago, eventually settling in the hilly savanna terrain of present-day Yagba land. The village developed as an independent community under its own traditional ruler, the Obajema of Ife-Olukotun, whose stool remains active and is classified as a third-class traditional institution in Kogi State.

Like most Yagba communities, Ife-Olukotun was affected by the 19th-century Yoruba wars and the subsequent Fulani jihadist incursions into northern Yorubaland, though it largely escaped direct conquest. During the colonial period, it fell under the Northern Nigeria Protectorate and later the Kabba Province.

== Geography ==
Ife-Olukotun is located approximately 15 km northwest of the Yagba East LGA headquarters at Isanlu and about 180 km southwest of Lokoja, the Kogi State capital. The village lies on undulating terrain typical of the Yoruba hills, with elevations around 400–450 metres above sea level. It is surrounded by rocky outcrops and seasonal streams that feed into the broader River Niger basin.

== Economy ==
The economy is predominantly subsistence and small-scale commercial agriculture. Major crops include:

- Yam
- Cassava
- Maize
- Cashew
- Cocoa
- Oil palm

Many residents engage in petty trading, artisanal crafts, and seasonal migration to urban centres such as Lagos, Abuja, and Ilorin for additional income. A modest number of inhabitants are civil servants or work in nearby Isanlu and Egbe.

== Culture and society ==
The people of Ife-Olukotun are Yagba/Ekiti peoole and speak the Yagba/Ekiti dialect of Yoruba. Traditional religion coexists with Christianity (major denominations include Baptist, Catholic, Anglican, and Pentecostal) and a smaller Muslim population.

Annual festivals include the New Yam Festival (Ọdún Ijesu) and the Egungun masquerade celebrations. The village maintains a palace system headed by the Obajema, supported by a council of chiefs (Olu’s and Ijoye’s).

== Education and infrastructure ==
Ife-Olukotun has several public primary schools and at least one community secondary school. Electricity supply from the national grid is intermittent, and most households rely on generators or solar power. Mobile telephone coverage (MTN, Airtel, Glo) is generally available. The village is connected by feeder roads to the Isanlu–Egbe highway.
