= Lagos Book and Art Festival =

Literary festival in Lagos state, Nigeria

- Status: Active
- Genre: Arts festival, book festival
- Frequency: Annually
- Locations: Goethe-Institut, British Council, Freedom Park, Lagos
- Country: Nigeria
- Inaugurated: 1999; 27 years ago
- Organizer: Committee for Relevant Art
- Website: www.lagosbookartfestival.org

The Lagos Book and Art Festival (LABAF) is an annual arts festival founded in 1999 by the Committee for Relevant Art (CORA), a Nigeria-based cultural organisation.

== History ==
The maiden edition of the festival was held in November 1999 at Jazz 38’s permanent site in Lekki, Lagos. The idea behind the festival was to commemorate Nigeria's return to democracy after more than three decades of military regimes and to have a festival that would re-energise the scene and refocus both the young and old, especially the book-reading culture, which was gradually dying. Dubbed "Africa’s biggest culture picnic", the Lagos Book and Art Festival is held over a seven-day period in different venues including Goethe-Institute, the British Council, and Freedom Park, all in Lagos State.

== Festival highlights ==
LABAF features a number of different activities including pre-festival activities like book treks and other major festival activities including musical performances, book readings, film screenings, a publishers’ forum], book and art exhibitions, panel discussions, colloquiums, symposiums, book presentations, cultural exhibitions, book reviews, a green festival and more events. The festival also enables the participation of students of primary and secondary schools and universities in Nigeria by introducing competition and mentoring opportunities for them.

The festival also selects different books yearly that are featured as Books of the Festival and form part of the festival's discourse for that year.

The 21st edition of the festival took place 4–10 November 2019 with the theme "Emerge... Breaking into the New". This theme was dedicated in loving memory of the great multimedia artist David Herbert Dale, who died on Tuesday, 4 August 2019. The festival was also slated to celebrate different literary icons who had died during the year, including Pius Adesanmi, Eddie Ugbomah, Bisi Silva, and others. The festival's theme in 2017 was Eruptions: Global fractures and the out common humanity, while in 2018 it was Renewal: Towards a world that works for all. The festival is always a time when there will be book reviews, film screenings, documentaries, workshops, plays and lots of presentations to thrill its guests and spectators.

== Festival objective and purpose ==
LABAF, which is also known as biggest culture picnic on the continent, is a plethora of different activities, some fun-filled while some are deeply intellectual purpose is to cultivate ad revive the reading culture that is on a steady decline, the active promotion of culture and the need to keep encouraging speaking and writing in our indigenous languages. The festival is promoted not just to sell books but promote arts and the impact of arts and books on society in every strata, spectrum and demography. Several writing and reading competitions are promoted by LABAF.
