= Nduka Otiono =

Nigerian-Canadian professor

Nduka Anthony Otiono
- Born: Kano, Nigeria
- Occupation: Academic
- Known for: DisPlace: The Poetry of Nduka Otiono
- Title: Director of Institute of African Studies, Carleton University, in Ottawa, Canada

Academic background
- Education: University of Ibadan (B.A. (Hons), MA); University of Alberta (PhD)
- Doctoral advisor: Heather Zwicker
- Influences: Chinua Achebe

Academic work
- Discipline: English and Film Studies Scholar
- Website: https://ndukaotiono.com/

Nduka Anthony Otiono is a Nigerian-Canadian professor, writer, poet, and journalist. He is the Director, Institute of African Studies, Carleton University, in Ottawa, Canada and his multidisciplinary research addresses how street stories —popular urban narratives in postcolonial Africa—travel through many cultural formations, such as oral tradition, the press, movies, popular songs, and social networks.

== Early life ==
Nduka Anthony Otiono hails from Ogwashi-Ukwu in Delta State, south-southern Nigeria but was born in Kano (the capital city of Kano State, northern Nigeria). He earned his Ph.D. in English from the University of Alberta in Canada (2011) in addition to a Bachelor of Arts (Hons) in English and an MA in English from the University of Ibadan, Nigeria in 1987 and 1990 respectively.

== Early career ==
Otiono was a journalist at the early part of his career. He worked in print media, with a focus on literary and cultural journalism, and earned expertise at the editing and management levels. During his fifteen years journalistic career, He was the National Secretary of the Association of Nigerian Authors (2001–2005) the founding editor of The Post Express Literary Supplement (PELS), which won Literary Column of the Year 1997 and the first ANA Merit Award in 1998. The Night Hides with a Knife (short stories), which won the ANA/Spectrum Prize, Voices in the Rainbow (poems), which was a finalist for the ANA/Cadbury Poetry Prize, and Love in a Time of Nightmares (poems), for which he received the James Patrick Folinsbee Memorial Scholarship in Creative Writing, are just a few of the works he has published. He made the transition to academia in 2004 and started working as an adjunct lecturer at the University of Ibadan's Department of English.

== Career in Canada ==
Otiono left Nigeria for Canada in 2006. In 2011, he obtained his PhD in English from the University of Alberta and in the same year, he held a one-year postdoctoral fellowship at Brown University, where he was also appointed Visiting assistant professor.

In 2014, he became an assistant professor at Carleton's Institute of African Studies, Ottawa, Canada. In 2020, he was promoted to associate professor at Carleton's Institute of African Studies. In 2022, he became the Director, Institute of African Studies, Carleton University, and was also appointed a Faculty Advisor for Anti-Black Racism and Black Inclusion by the university authority in the same year.

== Research area ==
Otiono research interests include Cultural Studies, Oral Literature, Postcolonial Studies, Media and Communication Studies, Globalization and Popular Culture.

== Awards, honours and scholarships ==
In 2006, Otiono won FS Chia Doctoral Scholarship at University of Alberta. One year later, he was nominated for Trudeau Scholarship and in 2008, he was awarded Professional Development Research Grant. In the same year, he was awarded Andrew Stewart Memorial Graduate Prize for Research by the same institution. In 2009, he won Sarah Nettie Christie Research Award, William Rea Scholarship, Izaak Walton Killam Memorial Scholarship, Gordin Kaplan Graduate Student Award. In 2010, he won James Patrick Folinsbee Memorial Scholarship in Creative Writing, in 2011, he was nominee for the Governor General's gold medal. In 2015 and 2016, he received the Carnegie African Diaspora Fellowship and in the latter year he won Capital Educators’ award for excellence in teaching. In 2017, he won Carleton University Faculty of Arts and Social Science Early Career Research Excellence Award and in 2018, he was given the Black History Ottawa Community Builder Award. In 2022, he made it to the final list of Archibald Lampman Prize for poetry for his anthology DisPlace and in 2023, he was one of the winners of FASS Research Excellence Awards.

== Publications ==
- The Night Hides with a Knife 1995 (Short Stories).
- Voices in the Rainbow (Poems) 1997
- We-men: An Anthology of Men Writing on Women (1998)
- Camouflage: Best of Contemporary Writing from Nigeria (2006).
- Love in a Time of Nightmares. (Poems) 2008.
- Polyvocal Bob Dylan: Music, Performance, Literature.
- Wreaths for a Wayfarer: An Anthology in Honour of Pius Adesanmi.
- Oral Literary Performance in Africa: Beyond Text.
- DisPlace: The Poetry of Nduka Otiono. (2021).
