= Matsue incident =

Coup d'état attempt in Japan on August 24, 1945

The Matsue incident, also known as the Matsue Riot incident, Imperial Voluntary Army incident, or the Shimane Prefectural Office incendiarism, was an incident that occurred in Japan after the Japanese surrender on 15 August 1945. The incident was staged by about forty dissidents, who attacked facilities in Matsue City, Shimane Prefecture, at dawn on 24 August 1945, resulting in one fatality.

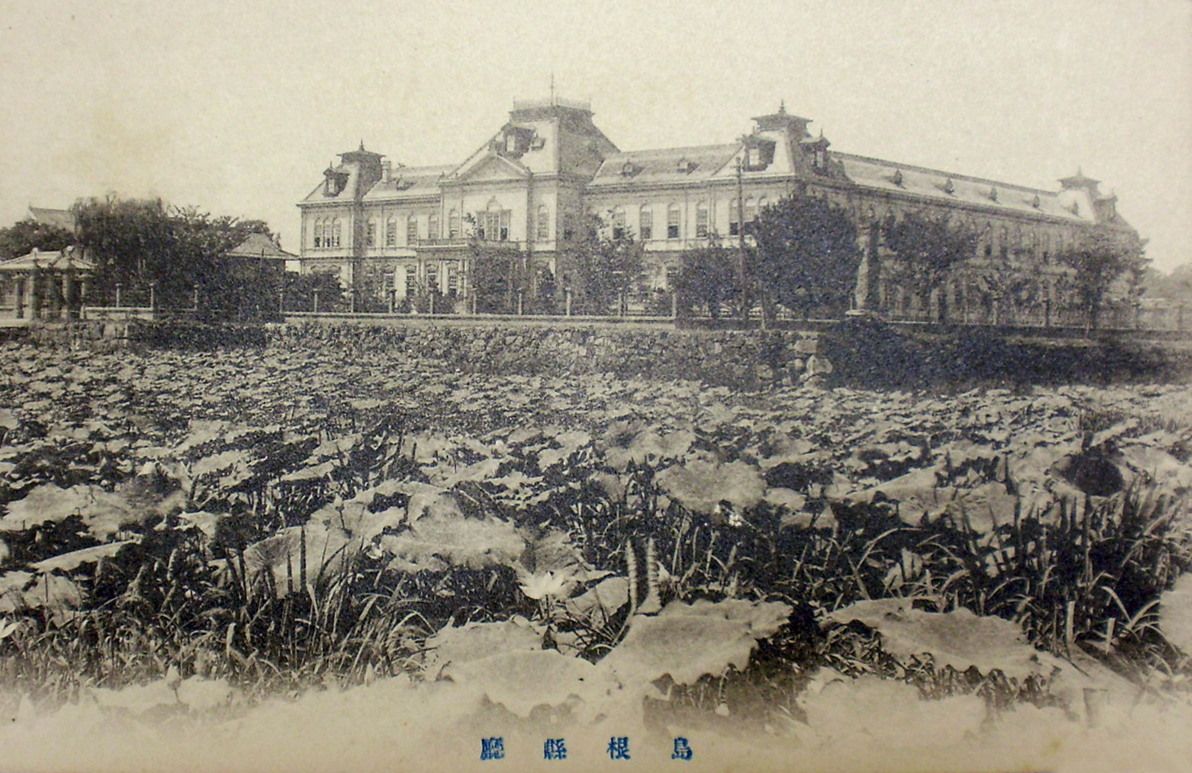
Shimane Prefectural Office (1909–1945)

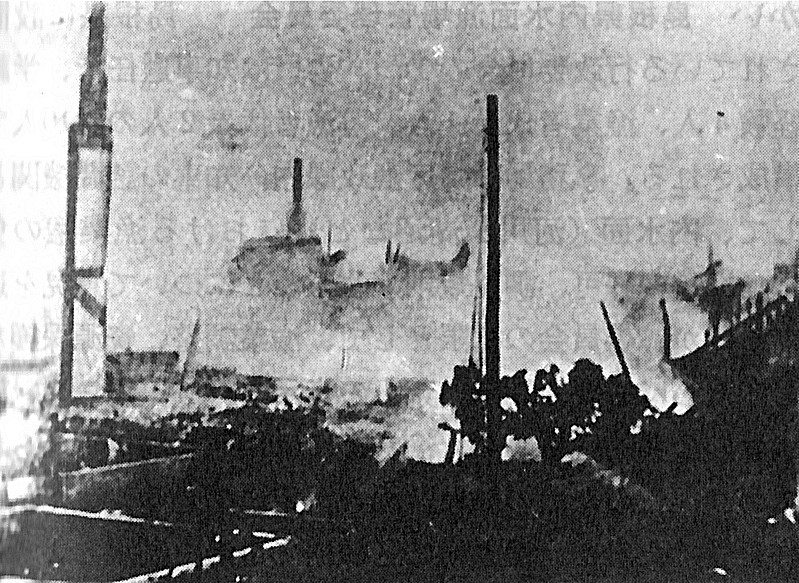
Shimane Prefectural Office aflame

== Background ==
On 15 August 1945, Hirohito, the Emperor of Japan, broadcast the surrender of Japan by radio, thereby ending World War II. Following the broadcast, dissidents throughout Japan reacted unfavorably to the announcement. On that day, an armed group of dissidents who called themselves Sonno-Doshikai, gathered in Atagoyama, a small mountain in the central part of Tokyo. This group called for opposition to the surrender and expected that members of the Japanese armed forces would support them. The Matsue Incident, a last attempt at a coup d'état, was a response to this call. Ten people were killed and two arrested.

Leaders of the attempted coup were brought to trial before the Supreme Court of Judicature.

== General description ==
At dawn on 24 August, the leader of the group, 25-year-old Isao Okazaki, and the group's members, also in their twenties, attacked key facilities in Shimane Prefecture, including the prefectural office, a newspaper company and a power plant. The newspaper company and the power plant subsequently suffered by having some of their functions curtailed. The group had planned to kill the governor and the top public prosecutor, but failed. They rushed into the Matsue Broadcasting Station and asked to use it to deliver their message, but the station master refused. During the negotiation, police and the army encircled the group and all members were arrested. The prefectural office and the prefectural 3,000 square metres (32,000 sq ft) assembly hall burned down, and one occupant died during the confusion. The electricity was cut off for three and a half hours and the newspaper was published only in tabloid format until 31 August. The people of Shimane were shocked by these events, but the media coverage was strictly censored. This measure was successful in discouraging similar incidents.

The ringleaders were imprisoned. After their release, some of them obtained jobs, one as a teacher, one at a printing company and another at a waste disposal company. The whereabouts of many former rioters are not disclosed in available sources.

== Isao Okazaki ==
Every group member who participated in the Matsue incident had been recruited by Isao Okazaki (岡崎功 Okazaki Isao, 1920–2006), his second-in-command, Bunmei Hasegawa, and his third-in-command, Yasuhiko Hatano. Hasegawa and Hatano had been influenced by Masaharu Kageyama of Daitojuku, a nationalist.

Okazaki was born in Shimane Prefecture and after graduation from a middle school he worked in a Japanese firm in Manchuria for two years. After returning to Japan, he entered Rissho University with the objective of becoming a monk. At the same time, he became a member of an ultra-nationalist group, Kinno Makotomusubi. With independent funds, he built what he called the Isshinryo in the Meguro District of Tokyo. At this location he discussed with his friends the news of Japanese reverses in the war. He suggested that the military cabinet be overthrown. Eventually, they tried to obtain weapons for this purpose.

When the plot became known in July 1943, he was arrested and given two years of imprisonment with three years of suspension in September 1944. He was released from prison in November but was under the constant supervision of special police. After returning to Matsue, he became a member of the government mobilization office. Because he was inclined to sympathize with the circumstances of the families of the people being mobilized, he was in frequent conflict with his superiors. For example, he was ordered to select 75 women to work at the Kure Naval Arsenal. He realized that women of higher status were not part of the selection pool, and leaked this fact. He was forced to resign from this office as a result.

He then became a voluntary member of the Dai Nippon Genron Hōkokukai, a right-wing party.

== From V-J Day to the Matsue Incident ==
On 16 August, the Matsue Shimbun (newspaper) reported that the broadcast of the emperor had been a call for a cease-fire. The Emperor's message had been spoken in Classical Japanese (文語体), which was not well understood by the average person.

On 15 and 16 August, the Governor of Shimane Prefecture, Takeo Yamada, made several public announcements asking for unity. The Prefectural Government demanded public order. On the other hand, the military commander of the Matsue District Headquarters, Major General Zensho Ogawa, stated that the district should retain its fighting spirit until a peace treaty was concluded. Ogawa stated that the country should not be misled by groundless rumors; the broadcast of a cease-fire did not immediately mean peace.

Immediately after 15 August, various incidents transpired within Japan. These came to an end before 22 August. In Shimane Prefecture, Japanese planes scattered leaflets reading "Continue the war". In the large cities of Tokyo and Osaka, which had been devastated, it was apparent that Japan could not continue the war. But in outlying regions like San-in, such as Shimane, where air-raids had been on a small scale, continuing the war when the mainland was attacked appeared possible. On 15 August, Hasegawa and Hatano heard the broadcast and understood that Japan was defeated. Saburoemon Sakurai, the head of Hokokukai, realized that Okazaki would rise up. But he could go no further since he had met with the leadership of the army and learned that the army would not join the proposed coup-d'etat.

=== Hatano in Tokyo ===
Since Okazaki was under the strict observation of the special police, he sent Hatano to Tokyo to provoke a dramatic incident that would bring the nation to their side. In Matsue, Okazaki continued negotiating with the army. On 22 August, it was reported that the American forces would land on August 26 at the earliest, so that Okazaki set a date for the uprising before 25 August. They wrote their opinions in leaflets, such as "The country of kami knows no defeat", "Message to People of Shimane", "To the Imperial Army and Navy Members" on sheets of paper in India ink; however, the airplanes at the Miho air base had been destroyed on 22 August and could not scatter them as intended.

=== Day before the uprising ===
On the night of 23 August, Hatano reported from Tokyo his intelligence to Okazaki. The plan:

- The Shimane Prefectural office will be burned.
- The governor will be killed.
- The telephone room of the Matsue Post Office will be destroyed.
- The functions of Shimane Newspaper will be destroyed.
- The electricity of the power plant of Matsue will be cut, for the execution of our uprising.
- The top public prosecutor will be killed.
- Pamphlets will be distributed on the streets by woman members.
- After that, the Shimane broadcasting station will be captured to broadcast news of the uprising.
- The starting time will be 2:40 a.m. on August 24.

Okazaki ordered Hatano and others to go to the Matsue Gokoku Shrine, since he himself continued under police observation. He went to the army police headquarters for weapons. However, the army police officer was not cooperative.

== Uprising and assignments ==
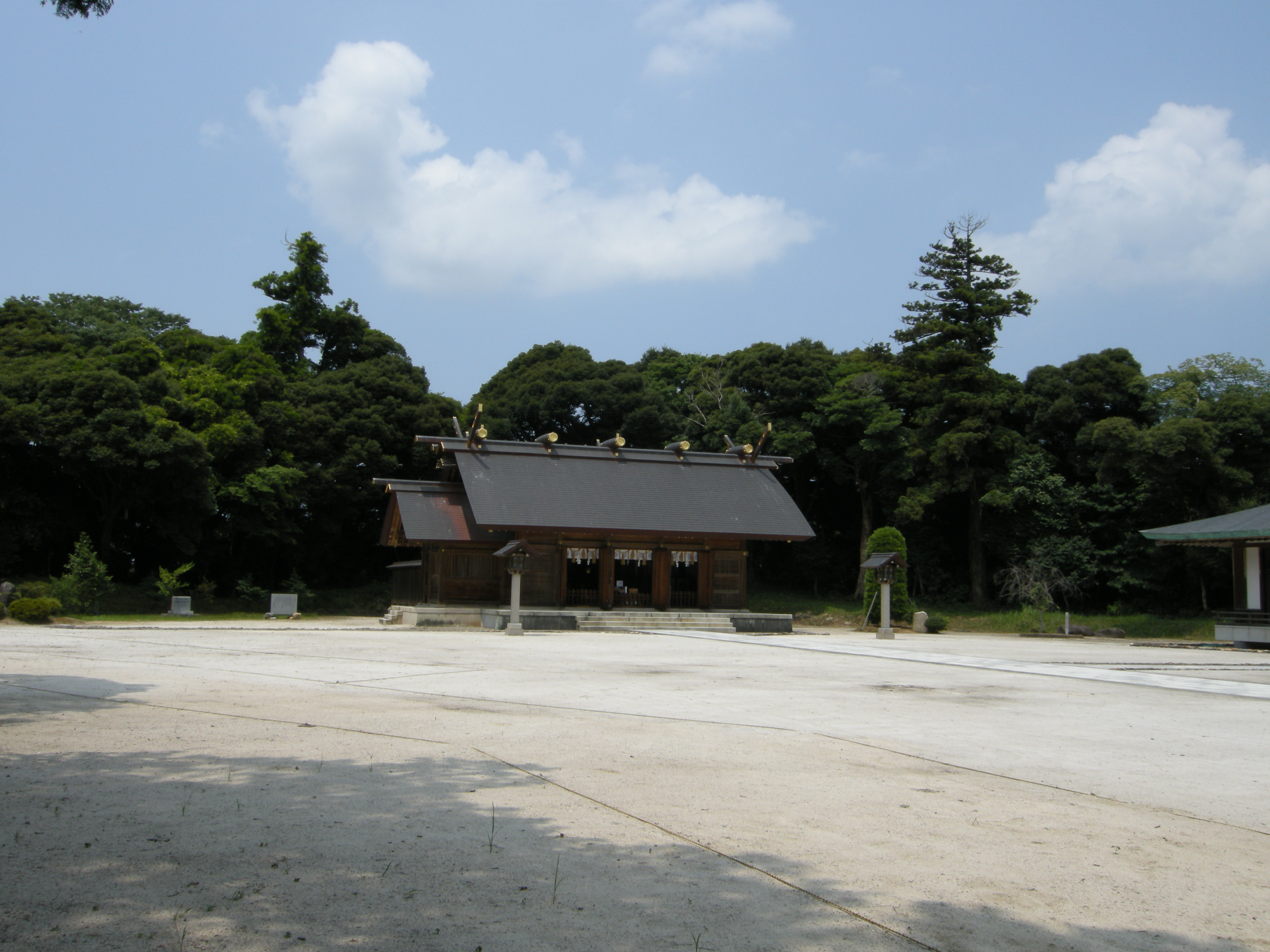
Matsue Gokoku Shrine, photo taken in 2008

Those who participated in the uprising gathered at 1 a.m. at the Matsue Gokoku Shrine. All were in their twenties. The men were clad in the khaki-colored national uniforms of that time, while the women wore a simple kimono or monpe. Hasegawa and Moriwaki had Japanese swords. Fujii had four sticks of dynamite. There were 15 rifles available, including type 38 rifles obtained from Matsue Middle School. The students, anticipating this possibility, had hidden the bullets. Before the uprising, Okazaki addressed them and told them that their deaths would be like that of the samurai Kusunoki Masashige, who was an inspiration for the Meiji Restoration. This new uprising would similarly lead to the spiritual restoration of Japan. Hatano related the situation in Tokyo and Hasegawa gave them their assignments:

- The governor's house: Okazaki and 5 others
- The prosecutor's house: Shigeo Takagi and 3 others
- The prefectural office: Shokichi Moriwaki and 3 others
- Matsue post office: Ryosaburo Fujii and 2 others
- Chugoku power plant: Bunmei Hasegawa and 4 others
- Shimane newspaper: Seto Shiranami and 4 others
- Ono gun shop: Yasuhiko Hatano and 4 others
- Distribution of pamphlets: Kan-ei Moriwaki and 15 woman members of the group.

It was decided that after every team attained their respective goals, they would go to the broadcasting station. Whoever resisted them was to be killed. The number of group members differs according to the source consulted; the smallest number was 15: Okazaki and 14 other people. Other sources say 34 men and women including Okazaki; 46 people were collected by Okazaki; 47 people, 16 of them women; 48 people, 8 of whom were women; and 40 plus several other people.

== Course of uprising ==
The uprising started earlier than scheduled. The attacks on the governor and the chief prosecutor started on schedule but failed. The attacks on the post office and on the gun shop also failed. At 2 a.m. the prefectural office team went into the campus, but one of them was watched by a policeman on duty. The team broke into the office and set it on fire at 2:20, 20 minutes before the scheduled time. Kan Sōda, master of a small restaurant, rushed to the scene of the fire and was murdered by Takeshi Kitamura, a member, who mistook Sōda for a person trying to resist them. He was the only fatality during the uprising. The newspaper team broke into the newspaper building amid confusion resulting from the fire and cut the belts of the printing machine. The power plant team arrived at the plant later than 3 a.m. and cut the 65,000 volt cable. The electricity of Matsue went off for the following three-and-a-half hours. The governor and the chief prosecutor were not in their houses since they had rushed to the prefectural office when it started to burn. The post office team succeeded in setting the dynamite but it failed to explode, although the fuse burnt. The gun shop team could not reach the shop.

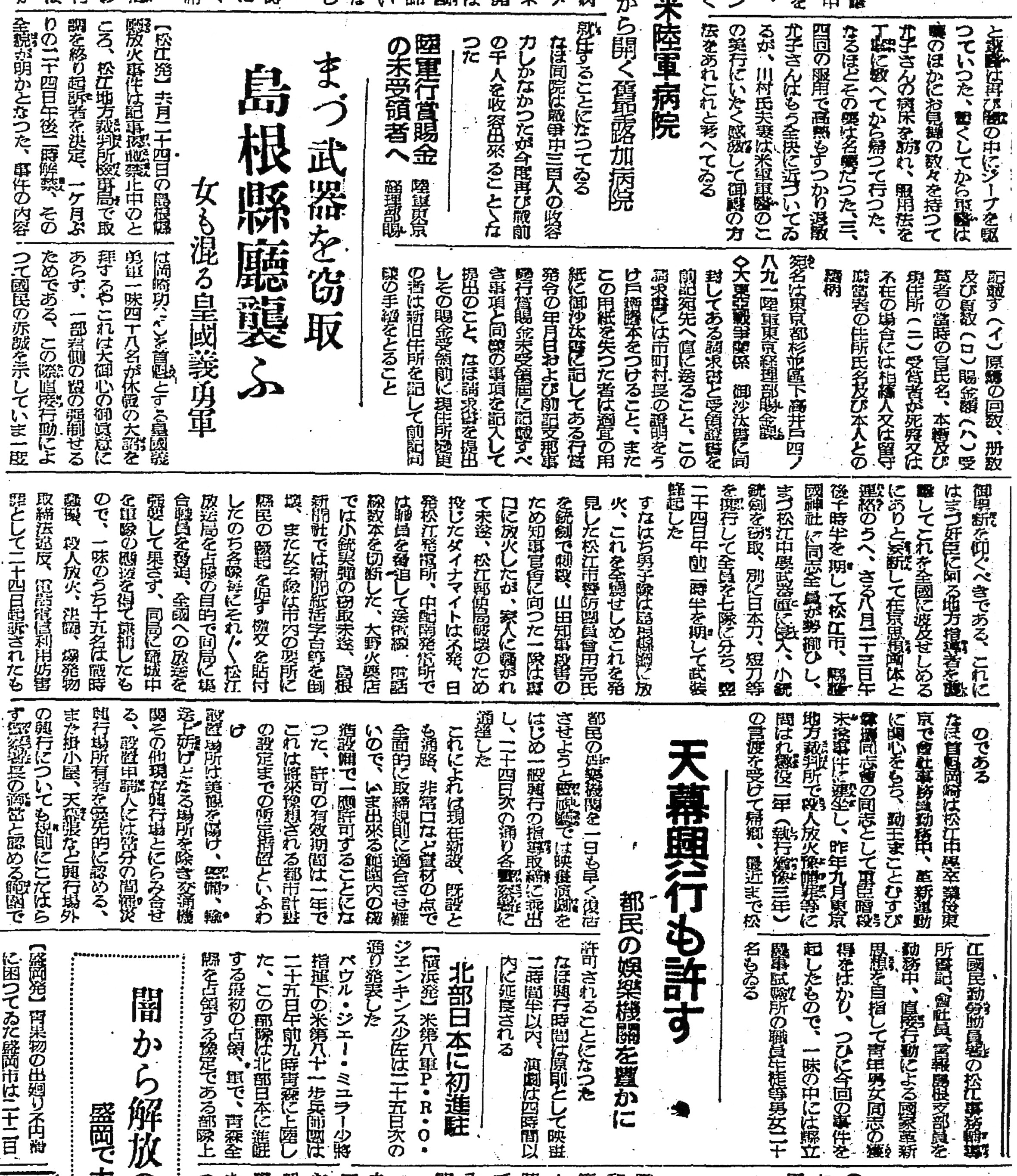
Asahi Shimbun on 25 September, only appearing one month after the incident because of censorship

== Broadcasting station ==
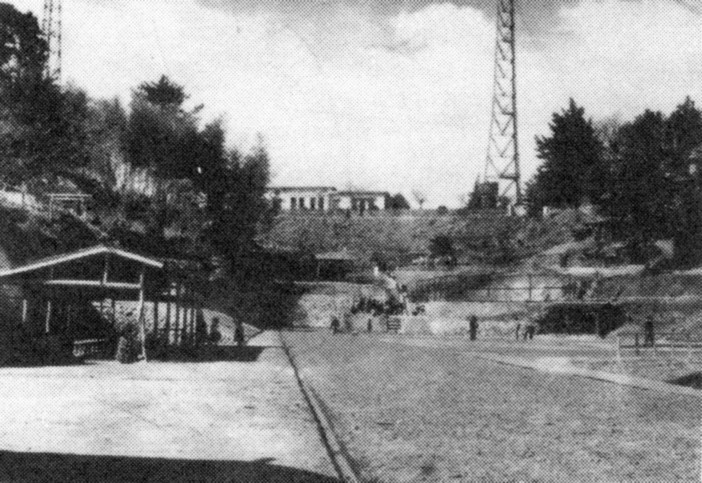
Matsue Broadcasting Station in 1940

Every party except the gunshop attacking group gathered at the Matsue broadcasting station. They requested the station to broadcast their message of uprising but the station master rejected the request. The station was surrounded by 50 armed policemen and 20 soldiers. Okazaki declared that he and his group were patriots, the Japanese forces had betrayed them, and their enemies were traitors. A top Civil Secret Policeman whom Okazaki knew urged negotiations for fear of a gun battle. Okazaki finally surrendered on condition that their party be acquitted, except for himself. Okazaki proposed that all should bow in the direction of Tokyo and all of them present then shouted, Tennō Heika Banzai (Hail to the Emperor).

The armed party members went to the Matsue Police Station without any restriction and entered the Japanese fencing gym of the police station while Okazaki and the special police chief negotiated. The police chief withdrew his offer made during the previous negotiation since the prosecutor now told him that it was impossible to release the members. Okazaki protested but had to accept the situation. Issuing his last message to the members, he attempted seppuku on the abdomen and neck. He was sent unconscious to Matsue Red Cross hospital and survived. All members were investigated at the police station on suspicion of wartime rioting, invasion without permission, postal and gas service obstruction, and violation of rules on explosives. The female members were released the next day, and the other members except for the leaders of each team were released two days later.

== Police ==
Kunijiro Nishimura, a policeman responsible for the order of the Prefecture, published a book of memoires, Reflection memorandum on Shimane Prefecture Arson Incident on 2 September 1946. He wrote that every measure should have been taken to prevention the worst outcome, but that had not been done thoroughly. There was some psychological confrontation between the police leadership and the leadership of the Civil Secret Police. The author might have assumed that officials from a rural district could not do anything properly. The author asked the leadership of the Special Police (Civil Secret Police) how many right-wing persons there were who needed to be watched in the prefecture, and the answer was one, meaning Okazaki. The special police ignored the information that people had been inflamed by pamphlets distributed by airplane.

They ignored the National Volunteer Army members, who had sounded a siren and publicly demonstrated with bamboo spears. On 23 August, the special police halved the number of policemen on duty. Nishimura stated that they should have prepared more thoroughly and taken these events into consideration when deciding on police staffing.

On the night of the uprising, Governor Takeo Yamada was informed of the arson by the police. He immediately rushed to the scene with a cudgel, and confirmed the safety of the photograph of Hirohito. It was transferred to the Shiroyama underground shelter, where he also went to command the prefectural officers.

== Burning the prefectural office ==
More than 2,000 people gathered to watch the burning prefectural office, but no one dared to extinguish the fire. They were looking at the burning office absentmindedly, thinking of the future of Japan, according to a newspaper. Another document recorded that people who had endured the government policy and Mabiki sokai (forced evacuation of houses), shouted, "This is the Heaven's punishment against the evacuation of my house, I want to see the face of those who performed the bad policy in the name of the emperor." The force of fire was strong and fearful; the prefectural office was on the other side of Matsue O-hashi bridge, but a housewife stated she had felt that the fire would come to the other side of the bridge.

== Trial ==
The first session of the trial began at the Matsue Regional Court on 5 November 1945. Accused were 15 members of the Japanese Empire Voluntary Army; the presiding judge was Tadatoshi Mitsuse. Okazaki was clad in traditional Japanese silk clothing. Finding American officers inside the court, Okazaki asked if the trial would be undertaken under the name of the Emperor, or the Americans. Mitsuse replied that the trial would take place under the name of the Emperor. Members of the Japanese Empire Voluntary Army took this seriously and admitted every fact of the crimes as true. On 7 November, Okazaki stated the motives for their uprising. He wanted to remove senior statesmen and zaibatsu around the emperor, and wanted to establish a Shōwa Restoration cabinet. The summary of his statement on 7 and 25 November is:

It is an act of serving the enemy that Hideki Tojo became premier without any prospect of victory and in the end, lost office. Failure in the politics is surely an act serving the enemy, like the acts of sabotage or espionage. Even during the Russo-Japanese war, soldiers who fought were called invalids, this is what I cannot bear. Mamoru Shigemitsu stated that it was a pleasure that the defeat of the war would bring freedom and democracy. We lost the sacred war and what is the pleasure? [Here, Okazaki made a long statement concerning his mental attitude leading to the incident]. The blind acceptance of kojiki ideology was blamed for leading to the incident, but is there anything better than kojiki ? We are emperor-centered. We are neither right-wing nor left-wing. The Great Pacific War was intended to be the realization of kojiki and not a war for invasion. If our conducts violated the laws, it is only myself who is responsible for the conducts and only I should be punished, not the other members. Our attempt failed, but I am satisfied if this led the Japanese people to an awakening and the attainment of the Showa Restoration.

The prosecutor conceded that this incident derived from the loyalty of the group to the emperor and their patriotism. But as the imperial rescript had warned the Japanese people against rashness, the uprising was illegal. Any alleged patriotic conduct must be punished if it violates published imperial rescript.

The two defense lawyers stated that this was a historic case. At the time of the uprising, Okazaki was under the observation of the special police and therefore the special police was partly responsible for what happened. The prosecutor side was the target of the uprising and justice could not be maintained. The prosecutor had wrongly blamed loyalty. The uprising took place after the end of the war, therefore, the accusation of "wartime" rioting could not be confirmed.

The regional court concluded its work on 20 December, and on 2 May 1947, the final judgement was made at the Daishin-in at the last stage of the Supreme Court proceedings.

=== Results of the trial ===
Prosecutor's Opinion and Decision
| Accused | Prosecutor's opinion | Decision of the court | Decision of Daishin-in |
|---|---|---|---|
| Isao Okazaki | Death penalty | Life imprisonment | Life imprisonment |
| Bunmei Hasegawa | 15 years | 10 years | 12 years |
| Shokichi Moriwaki | Life imprisonment | 8 years | 10 years |
| Yasuhiko Hatano | 15 years | 7 years | 10 years |
| Yoshisaburo Fujii | 12 years | 5 years | 7 years |
| Takeshi Kitamura/Mifu Izumi | 12 years | Between 5 and 10 years | Between 5 and 10 years |
| Shigeo Takagi | 10 years | 2 years and 6 months | 5 years |
| Seto Shiranami | 10 years | 2 years with 5 years of suspension | 3 years |
| Shoichi Usa | 6 years | 2 years with 5 years of suspension | 2 years |

== Amnesty and life in postwar years ==
Okazaki was imprisoned for six years and seven months, although he had been sentenced to life imprisonment. On 3 November 1946 and 18 April 1952, he was granted an amnesty. There were only seven amnesties granted between the promulgation of the Meiji Constitution and participation in the United Nations. However, for Okazaki, Hatano and Hasegawa, it was not beneficial to them as far as their life was concerned, since they failed in their uprising and were not allowed imprisonment and had to plunge into the postwar society of Japan.

The main members of this incident did not meet after their release from prison. Okazaki and Hatano lived in Matsue, while Hasegawa went to Tokyo. The whereabouts of other members was not known. Isao Okazaki was released from prison in 1952, the year Japan regained independence. He started to manage Matsue-Josai High School in 1960, now Rissho University Shonan Kotogakko (立正大学淞南高等学校) and became the chairman of its board of directors. In 1968, Okazaki ran for the House of Councilors on behalf of the national constituency, but failed. At that time, he was the president of Asahi Mokuzai Company and vice-president of the Shimane Prefecture rifle association. He joined the Sukyo Mahikari. He died in 2006.

== Confession of a woman member ==
19 years after the incident, a woman member made a confession.

I believed that the Japanese Empire was that of kami. In spite of the fact that we endeavored to win with all our strength, we were defeated. All of my convictions crumbled and I was unable to bear the strain. I believed that the strength of a nation lies on its forces and soldiers and joined the Empire Volunteer. If it will win, all of our members are prepared to die. My convictions are the same even now and I have no regrets.

== Criticism ==
Masanaka Naito commented that since Okazaki was acting in connection with the officers who favored resistance, the army police, Matsue regiment, Miho air base, the uprising might lead to a large riot. According to Shinshu Shimane Kenshi, what Okazaki did might mean his resistance to the Japanese leaders of the war, and their responsibility for the war. In October 1945, Shimane Prefecture issued a warning in order to calm down intraracial strife. Osami Maeda wrote that we should reevaluate the history of terrorism, and he concluded that the Matsue Incident was the end of the Showa war age, and the last of the Showa age uprisings. Toshihiro Nakagawa studied the Matsue uprisings in connection with other events of the Showa era. Although he did not approve of the incident, he evaluated the challenging attitude of those involved.

== See also ==
- Kyūjō incident
