= Naija No Dey Carry Last =

2015 satirical collection of essays by Pius Adesanmi

Naija No Dey Carry Last: Thoughts on a Nation in Progress
- Book Cover
- Author: Pius Adesanmi
- Language: English
- Genre: Satire
- Publication date: 2015
- Publication place: Nigeria
- Pages: 232

Naija No Dey Carry Last: Thoughts on a Nation in Progress is a satirical collection of essays by Nigerian author Pius Adesanmi. The collection is divided into four parts. Each part contained essays addressing a different issue. It was published in 2015 by Parrésia Publishers and Premium Times Books.

== Plot ==
The collection is divided into four sections:

- "Naija No Dey Carry Last"
- "In the Beginning was the Word"
- "Open Letters to Godot"
- "All the World’s a Stage"
