= Isao =

- Pronunciation: í-sá-ó
- Gender: Male
- Language: Japanese

Origin
- Meaning: It can have many different meanings depending on the kanji used.

Isao (いさお, イサオ) is a masculine Japanese given name which was popular during the Shōwa period (1926–1989).

== Written forms ==
Isao can be written using different kanji characters and can mean:

- 功, "achievement"
- 勲, "meritorious"
- 績, "exploits"
- 公, "public"
- 勇男, "brave, man"
- 勇夫, "brave, man"
- 勇雄, "brave, masculine"
- 伊佐夫
- 伊佐雄
- 伊三男

The name can also be written in hiragana or katakana.

== People with the name ==
- Isao Abe (阿部 功; 1912–1980), Japanese hammer thrower
- Isao Aoki (功, born 1942), Japanese professional golfer
- Isao Asai (浅井 功; born 1942), Japanese ice hockey player
- Isao Harimoto (勲, born 1940), Zainichi Korean professional baseball player
- Isao Hashizume (功, born 1941), Japanese actor
- Isao Hayashi (林 伊佐緒; 1912–1995), Japanese singer and composer
- Isao Homma (born 1981), Japanese footballer who plays for Albirex Niigata
- Isao Inokuma (功, 1938–2001), Japanese judoka
- Isao Iwabuchi (born 1933), Japanese Olympic football player
- Isao Kakihara (垣原 功; born 1944), Japanese ice hockey player
- Isao Kawabuchi (河淵 勲; born 1936), Japanese ice hockey player
- Isao Kikuchi (born 1921), American graphic designer, painter, carver, illustrator
- Isao Kimura (功, 1923–1981), Japanese actor
- Isao Kubota (born 1983), Japanese footballer who plays for Samut Songkhram
- Isao Kuraishi (倉石 功; born 1944), Japanese actor
- Isao Matsumiya, Japanese politician
- Isao Matsuoka (功, born 1934), Chairman of Toho
- Isao Morishita (森下 勲), Japanese motorcycle racer
- Isao Nakajima (中島 功; born 1941), Japanese swimmer
- Isao Nakauchi (功, 1922–2005), founder of Daiei
- Isao Obata (1904–1976), pioneering Japanese master of Shotokan karate
- Isao Okano (功, born 1944), Japanese judoka
- Isao Okawa (功, 1926–2001), former Chairman of Sega
- Isao Okazaki (功, 1920–2006), Japanese right-wing activist
- Isao Ono (小野 悳; born 1933), Japanese ice hockey player
- Isao Sasaki, (功, Japanese anime singer, actor, and voice actor
- Isao Takagi (高木 功; born 1961), Japanese professional wrestler
- Isao Takahata (勲, 1935–2018), Japanese anime director
- Isao Tamagawa (伊佐男, 1922–2004), Japanese actor
- Isao Tomita (勲, born 1932), Japanese electronic music composer
- Isao Yamada (山田 勇男; born 1952), Japanese film director
- Isao Yamagata (1915–1996), Japanese film actor (fl. 1951 and 1984)
- Isao Yamagishi (山岸 勲; born 1966), Japanese diver
- Isao Yoneda (功, born 1977), Japanese gymnast
- Isao Yukisada (勲, born 1968), Japanese film director

== Fictional characters ==
- Isao, a character in the manga series How to Keep a Mummy
- Isao Iinuma, protagonist of the novel Runaway Horses
- Isao Ohta (功), a character in the anime and manga series Mobile Police Patlabor
- Kondo Isao, a character in the anime and manga series Gin Tama
