= Jide Omokore =

Nigerian businessman

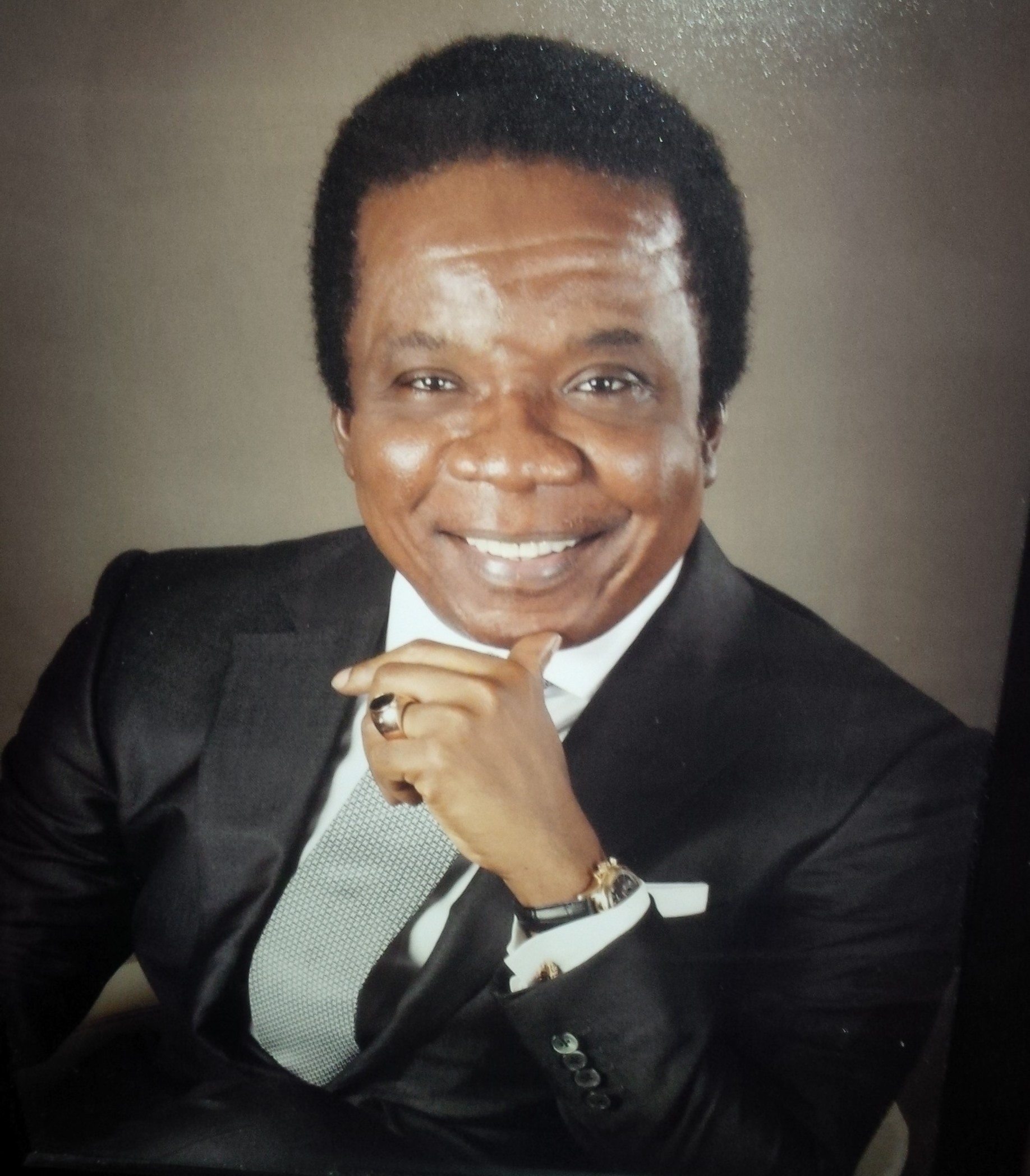

Jide Omokore is a businessman from Kogi State in the Middle Belt region of Nigeria. Omokore has business interests that span oil trading and exploration, marine, haulage services, steel, dredging engineering and property development.

== Background ==
Jide Omokore, who is of the Okun tribe from Yorubaland, hails from Isanlu town, headquarters of Yagba East Local Government Area of Kogi State, Nigeria. He lived most of his early adulthood in Egbe in Kogi State.

== Business career ==
Omokore plays entrepreneurial roles in key sectors of the Nigerian economy. He is involved in the upstream and downstream activities of the Nigerian oil and gas industry with the involvement of companies which he either founded or in which he has stakes. He is the chairman and founder of Energy Resources Group.

According to Forbes, which profiled Omokore as one of "Ten Nigerian Multi-Millionaires You've Never Heard Of", Energy Resources Group is "one of Nigeria's largest privately-held conglomerates. ERG has interests in oil trading and exploration, haulage services, steel, dredging engineering and property development." The group's annual revenue, as at the time of the Forbes report, was estimated to have exceeded $400 million.

Energy Resources Group is a conglomerate which comprises SPOG Petrchemicals Limited, Energy Resources Management Limited, Energy Property Nigeria Limited, Innovative Haulage Limited, Expedia Marine Ltd and Restore Engineering Limited.

Omokore also functions as chairman of Atlantic Energy Drilling Concept Nigeria Limited, a private upstream oil and gas company, with an increased focus on under-developed producing fields in Nigeria. In partnership with the Nigerian Petroleum Development Company (NPDC), Atlantic Energy focuses mainly on Niger Delta assets, contracted and executed under Strategic Alliance Agreements (SAAs) with the NPDC.

== Other interests ==
Omokore is a philanthropist and chieftain of the People’s Democratic Party (PDP). He donated fifty million naira (N50,000,000; $250,000) to the government of his home state, Kogi, as aid to victims who suffered damages during the 2012 Nigeria floods.

During the launch of the Kogi State Security Trust Fund in August 2014, Omokore donated the sum of N25,000,000 (over $125,000) in an effort to assist the government in its bid to stem the rising rate of crime in the state.

== Controversies ==
Omokore, co businessman Kola Aluko and former Nigeria Petroleum Minister Diezani Alison-Madueke are currently being investigated for a series of multi-billion dollar fraud and money laundering offences in Nigeria, the United Kingdom and America.
