= Leke Abejide =

Nigerian politician

Leke Joseph Abejide

Member of the House of Representatives of Nigeria
- Incumbent
- Assumed office 2019
- Constituency: Yagba East/Yagba West/Mopa-Muro Federal Constituency

Personal details
- Born: May 8, 1975 (age 51) Alu, Yagba East, Kogi State, Nigeria
- Party: African Democratic Congress (ADC)
- Occupation: Politician

Leke Joseph Abejide (born 8 May 1975) is a Nigerian politician representing Yagba Federal Constituency in the House of Representatives Kogi State.

== Early life and education ==
Abejide was born on 8 May 1975 in Alu, Yagba East Local Government Area of Kogi State, Nigeria. He earned a bachelor's degree in economics from Ahmadu Bello University and a Master of Business Administration from Bayero University Kano.

In 2019, Leke was elected to represent the Yagba Federal Constituency in the House of Representatives, and was re-elected for a second term in 2023.

== Political career ==
Abejide is a Nigerian politician and member of the African Democratic Congress (ADC). He was first elected to the House of Representatives of Nigeria in 2019 to represent the Yagba Federal Constituency of Kogi State. He was re-elected in the 2023 general election to represent the Yagba East/Yagba West/Mopa-Muro Federal Constituency in the 10th National Assembly.
