= Isanlu =

- Town
- Location in Nigeria
- Coordinates: 8°10′N 5°48′E
- Nigeria: Nigeria
- State: Kogi State
- LGA: Yagba East

Government
  - Type: Traditional
  - Agbana Of Isanlu: Ọbá Moses Babatunde Etombi

Area
  - Total: 80.8 km^{2} (31.2 sq mi)

Population (Population Density 2016)
  - Total: 200,000 (2,016)
  - Density: 40,030/km^{2} (103,700/sq mi)
  - Ethnicity: Yoruba
  - Religion: Christianity Muslim Traditional beliefs
- Time zone: UTC+1 (WAT)
- 6-digit postal code prefix: 262102
- ISO 3166 code: NG.IM.OE.OM

Isanlu is a town in Kogi State. It is the headquarters of Yagba East local government area of Kogi State in the south western part of Nigeria. The current Agbana of Isanlu is Ọbá Moses Babatunde Etombi.

== Culture ==
Isanlu is the political, social, and cultural center of the Yagba East, Mopa-Muro, and Yagba West local government areas. It is mainly populated by the indigenous Yagba/Ekiti people.

== Economy ==
Isanlu is populated by mainly farmers, and a few traders. This is mainly because of lack of infrastructure and development in the town.

== Festival ==
- New Yam festival
- Egungun Festival
- Christian festivals e.g. Christmas and Easter celebrations
- Muslim festivals e.g. Eid Al-Fitr and Eid Al-Adha celebrations
- Isanlu Day
- iyinfest
- Iya agba festival

== Notable people ==
- Pius Adesanmi
- Grace Oyelude
- Eyitayo Lambo
- Jide Omokore

== Education ==
Tertiary Institution

- Okunland International College of Nursing Science, Isanlu

Secondary schools

- Isanlu Community Secondary, Isanlu
- St Kizito's College, Isanlu
- Oluyori Muslim Comprehensive High School, Isanlu
- African Church Secondary School, Isanlu
- Folu International Schools, Isanlu
- Government Day Secondary School, Isanlu
- Lg Secondary School Idofin Isanlu
- Michaelian Group of Schools, Isanlu
- Isanlu High School, Ijowa Isanlu

Primary schools

- Community Primary School, Isanlu
- St. Joseph Primary School, Isanlu
- St Michael the Archangel Nursery/Primary School, Isanlu
- Ecwa Rev. Thamer Nursery and Primary School, Isanlu
- Yelgea Primary School, Isanlu
- Michaelian Catholic Nursery and Primary, School

== Religion ==
Christianity is the dominant religion in Isanlu, seconded by Muslim and Traditional beliefs.
