= Nana Darkoa Sekyiamah =

Ghanaian feminist writer and blogger

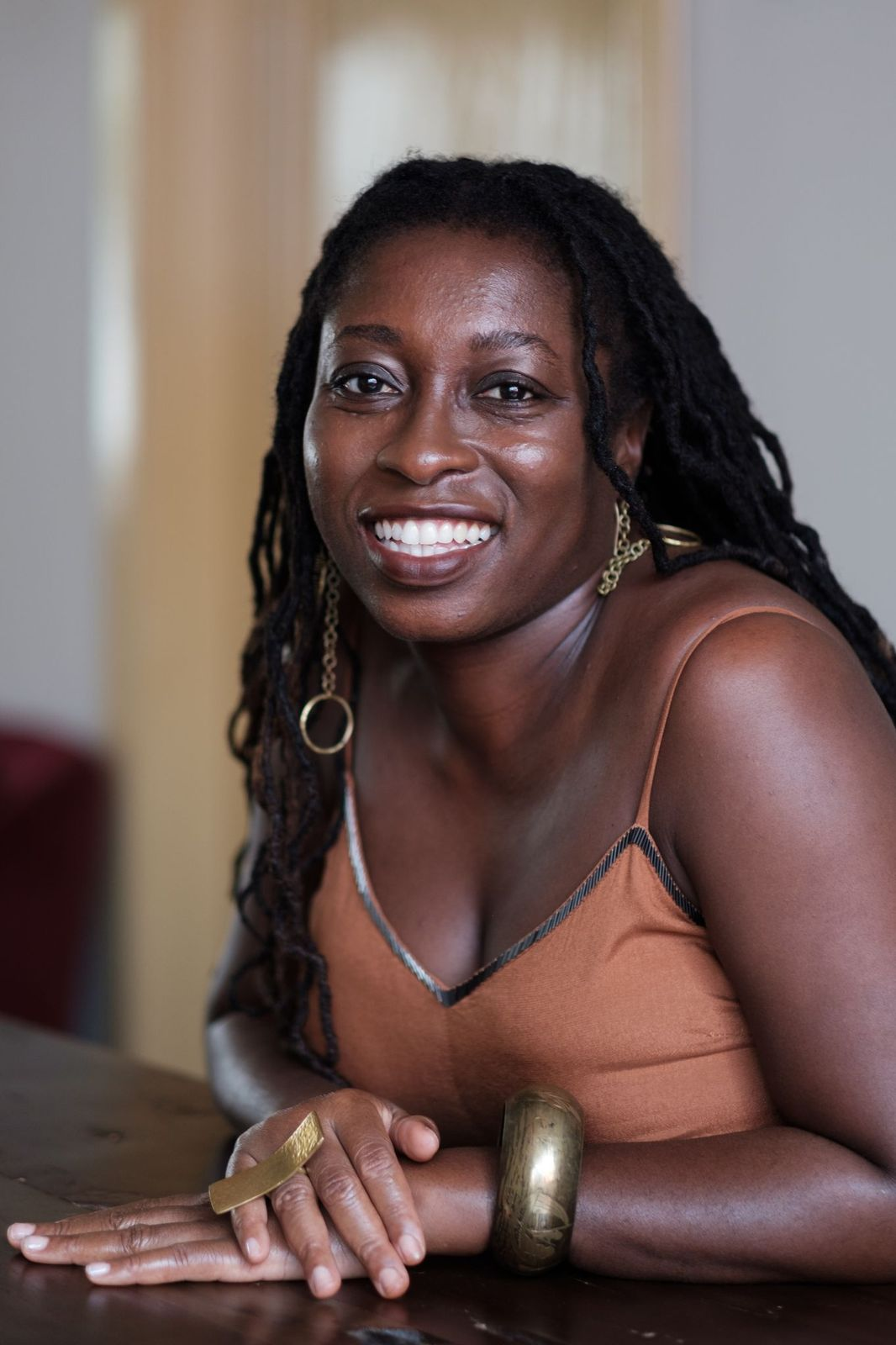
- Born: London, England
- Occupations: Writer, blogger, communications specialist
- Known for: Writing on women's rights and sexuality
- Notable work: The Sex Lives of African Women, "Seeking Sexual Freedom: African Rites, Rituals and Sankofa In The Bedroom"
- Website: https://www.darkoathewriter.com/

Nana Darkoa Sekyiamah is a Ghanaian feminist writer and blogger. She co-founded award-winning blog Adventures from the Bedrooms of African Women and has written for The Guardian and Open Democracy. Sekyiamah was formerly the Director for Communications manager at the Association for Women's Rights in Development and a member of the inaugural Black Feminisms Forum working group which organised the historic first Black Feminist Forum in Bahia, Brazil. She is the co-founder of the Institute for Journalism and Social Change (IJSC) and Chief Content Officer for MAKEDA PR.

== Life ==
Sekyiamah was born in London, England, to Ghanaian parents, and grew up in Ghana. She has a diploma in performance coaching and a certificate in conflict mediation and has worked as a life coach and a public speaker.

She was also awarded a Bachelor of Science degree in communications and cultural studies by the University of North London and a Master of Science degree in gender and development from the London School of Economics and Political Science.

Sekyiamah co-founded the blog, Adventures from the Bedrooms of African Women, to help widen discussion of sex and sexuality by African women and provide a forum for them to talk openly. They won the best overall blog and best activist blog prizes at the 2013 Ghana Blogging and Social Media Awards and best overall blog again in 2014. She also co-produced and co-hosted the Adventures from the Bedrooms of African Women podcast. In March 2011, Nana Darkoa was recognised by Arise magazine as one of "Ghana's Change Makers". She was also said to be "Changing the Way African Women Talk About Sex" in Harper's Bazaar in June 2022.In 2022, she was also highlighted in BBC 100 Women. In 2026, she was dubbed a "sex auntie" in The Guardian. The New York Times in 2022 credits Nana Darkoa as helping to "foster a sexual revolution" across the African continent. She was also listed as part of New African Magazine's 100 Most Influential Africans of 2023. Sekyiamah is the convener for Fab Fem, a feminist group that, though no longer active, regular met in Accra.

Sekyiamah has written articles for The Guardian and openDemocracy. She was also featured in the CNN on why women discussing their pleasure was a political act. She wrote the Communications Handbook for Women's Rights Organisations and has had short stories published in anthologies in many countries such as 'Today, Yesterday and Forever' in 'The Pot and Other Stories', FEMRITE 2016 and 'Ladies Night' in 'It Wasn't Exactly Love', Farafina 2015. Sekyiamah has written widely on the sexuality of African women and has also had an article ("Standpoint: Adventures from Our Bedrooms – Blogging about diverse erotic experiences") published in the peer-reviewed academic journal Feminist Africa.

Sekyiamah is the co-founder of the Institute for Journalism and Social Change (IJSC) and Chief Content Officer for MAKEDA PR She formerly worked as the Director of Communications at the Association for Women's Rights in Development (AWID). She is a member of the inaugural Black Feminisms Forum Working Group. She co-authored Creating Spaces and Amplifying Voices: The First Ten Years of the African Women's Development Fund on the early history of the fund. She also wrote Women Leading Africa: Conversations with Inspirational African Women, a collection of interviews with women from across Africa on topics including feminism, politics and the arts that came about through her work with the AWDF.

Sekyiamah was a speaker at the 2023 Open Book Festival in Cape Town, South Africa. She was also a keynote speaker in 2022 at the Asmara Addis Literary Festival In Exile in Brussels, Belgium. Nana Darkoa was also a headline speaker in 2022 at MOTO Festival in Nairobi, Kenya. She was a speaker at the 2015 Writivism Festival in Kampala, Uganda, and the 2016 Aké Arts and Book Festival in Abeokuta, Nigeria.

Her first book, The Sex Lives of African Women, was described as "an extraordinarily dynamic work". A stage adaptation was subsequently performed in Nairobi. Her second book, Seeking Sexual Freedom: African Rites, Rituals and Sankofa in the Bedroom came out in March 2026.

In December 2022, she was named on the BBC's 100 Women list as one of the world's inspiring and influential women of the year.

== Bibliography ==
- The Sex Lives of African Women (2021) Dialogue Books ISBN 978-0-349-70165-3
- Seeking Sexual Freedom: African Rites, Rituals and Sankofa in the Bedroom (2026) Dialogue Books ISBN 978-0-349-70341-1
