= Takete-Isao =

Village in Kogi State, Nigeria

Takete-Isao Tàkété-Ìsao Takete-Isao Onísu
- Village
- Location in Nigeria
- Coordinates: 8°10′18″N 5°42′35″E
- Country: Nigeria
- State: Kogi State
- LGA: Yagba East

Government
  - Type: Traditional monarchy
  - Traditional ruler: Oba Babatola Moses Bamidupe
- Elevation: 440 m (1,440 ft)
- Time zone: UTC+1 (WAT)
- Postal code: 262102
- ISO 3166 code: NG.KO.YE

Takete-Isao, also known as Takete-Isao Onísu (lit. 'Takete-Isao, the home of yam producers'), is a village in Yagba East Local Government Area of Kogi State, north-central Nigeria.

== History ==
Takete-Isao was established through pre-colonial migration and agricultural expansion by Yoruba-speaking peoples. The Okun people, including the Yagba subgroup to which Takete-Isao belongs, trace their origins to Ile-Ife according to oral tradition.

The village's traditional rulership is vested in the Oba of Takete-Isao, a stool recognised within the traditional governance structure of Yagba East. The current traditional ruler is HRH Oba Babatola Moses Bamidupe.

== Geography ==
Takete-Isao is located on fertile savanna woodland with loamy soils, approximately 20 kilometres (12 mi) northwest of Isanlu, the headquarters of Yagba East LGA. It is bordered by Ijowa-Isanlu to the north and Ejuku and Imela to the south. The village lies within the geographical coordinates 8°10′18″N 5°42′35″E, at an elevation of approximately 440 metres above sea level.

== Postal code ==
Takete-Isao falls under the postal code area 262102 of the Nigerian Postal Service (NIPOST), which covers multiple villages in Yagba East LGA including Agi, Aiyede, Ejuku, Ife-Olukotun, Igbagun, Ilai, Imela, Isao, Jege, Ogbon, Ohun, Okeagi, and Panyan.

== Economy ==
Agriculture is the primary economic activity. Takete-Isao is a major yam-producing community in the region, as reflected in its name "Onísu" (home of yam producers). Other crops cultivated include cassava, maize, cashew, and oil palm. Supplementary activities include livestock rearing and local trade.

== Demographics ==
The population is predominantly Okun Yoruba and speaks the Yagba dialect, which is part of the broader Okun linguistic group that includes dialects such as Owé, Ìyàgbà, Addé, Bùnú and Ọwọrọ.

Christianity is the most widely practised religion, with churches including the Roman Catholic Church, Evangelical Church Winning All (ECWA), The Apostolic Church (TAC), Pentecostal Church of God (PCGC), and Church of God in Christ (CGC). A minority continue to practise Yoruba traditional religion.

== Education ==
Educational institutions in the village include:

- Yagba East Local Government Education Authority Primary School (YELGEA), Takete-Isao
- Community High School (CHS), Takete-Isao

== Infrastructure ==
Takete-Isao is connected by all-season laterite roads to the Isanlu–Egbe highway. Electricity supply from the national grid is available but intermittent. Mobile telecommunication services are provided by major Nigerian networks.

== See also ==
- Okun people
- Yagba East
- List of villages in Kogi State
