= Lagos International Poetry Festival =

Poetry festival in Lagos, Nigeria

The Lagos International Poetry Festival, also often called LIPFest, is an annual festival of poetry which takes place in Lagos, Nigeria. Referred to as "an annual haven for Nigerian and international creatives, especially poets,” LIPFest was founded by Efe Paul Azino, a Nigerian spoken word artist and poet, to bring together an international array of poets, writers, artists, and public intellectuals to Lagos for a week of readings and performances, panel discussions, workshops, community outreaches, and a celebration of the art of poetry in general.

== History ==
Azino decided to create the festival as "a platform to cater to the growing number of poets in Lagos and Nigeria at large, due to the absence of such kind of festival" so as “to create a space in Lagos, every year, where poets from across the world could come to celebrate the written and spoken words.” The first edition in October 2015 was themed Borderless Words. Since its founding, it has been committed "to promoting poetry as a tool for social change and personal expression."

== Events and activities ==
Each year the festival is curated around specific themes designed to spark conversations and centre the concerns that shape our world. Activities typically include readings and performances, panel discussions on a broad range of topics, workshops, book launches, film screenings, and international cultural exchanges. Previous exchange programmes have included partnerships with the Southbank Centre, Poetry Africa, and Moniack Mhor, Scotland's National Writing Center. The festival also presents an annual poetry slam, a competitive showcase of young, talented spoken word artists and performance poets.

== Notable participants ==
Taking place in the culturally busy Lagos October season, alongside notable events like the Lagos Fashion Week, Lagos Photo Festival, and Art X, LIPFest is a global connecting point for established and emerging voices. Notable guests include such stalwart pioneers as Nobel Prize winner, Wole Soyinka, J. P. Clark, and Niyi Osundare, Booker Prize winner, Bernardine Evaristo, Kwame Dawes, Chris Abani, Jericho Brown, Lebo Mashile, Titilope Sonuga, Saul Williams, Kola Tubosun, Aja Monet, Danez Smith, Romeo Oriogun, Kaveh Akbar, Raymond Antrobus, Koleka Putuma, Bassey Ikpi, TJ Dema, Rudy Francisco, Inua Ellams, Jumoke Verissimo, Nadine Aisha Jassat, Victoria Adukwei Bulley, Wana Udobang, and many other poets.

== Impact and significance ==
The Lagos International Poetry Festival has made significant contributions to the cultural scene in Lagos and Nigeria as a whole. It has played a crucial role in the revival of poetry and spoken word as mainstream art forms and has been instrumental in fostering a sense of community among poets and literature enthusiasts. Its annual workshops and outreach programmes have served as a platform for nurturing the next generation of African poets and writers. Its global stage also provides a platform for established and emerging acts to connect to new audiences. The festival's annual poetry slam competition showcases and rewards some of Nigeria's best-spoken word and performance poetry talent.

In 2022 the festival launched its annual print and digital journal Márọkọ, connecting generations of African poets to readers across the world.
