= Ejuku =

Village in Yagba East, Kogi State, Nigeria

Ejuku Èjùkú
- Village
- Location in Nigeria
- Coordinates: 8°00′45″N 5°44′30″E
- Country: Nigeria
- State: Kogi State
- LGA: Yagba East

Government
  - Type: Traditional chieftaincy
  - Traditional ruler: Oluroke of Ejuku
- Elevation: 395 m (1,296 ft)
- Time zone: UTC+1 (WAT)
- Postal code: 262102
- ISO 3166 code: NG.KO.YE

Ejuku (Yoruba: Èjùkú) is a rural village in the Yagba East Local Government Area of Kogi State, Nigeria. It forms part of the Ekiti-speaking area of Kogi State and is listed among the settlements within Yagba East.

== Geography ==
Ejuku is located at approximately 8°00′45″N 5°44′30″E in a tropical savanna landscape. The village lies south of Isanlu, the administrative centre of Yagba East LGA. The surrounding terrain consists of gently rolling hills and scattered rock outcrops, with seasonal streams contributing to local drainage systems.

== Economy ==
Agriculture is the primary economic activity in Ejuku. Residents engage in small-scale farming, producing crops such as yam, cassava, maize, sorghum, beans, cashew and oil palm. Livestock rearing, including goats, sheep and poultry, also supports household income, alongside petty trading.

== Culture and society ==
Ejuku is inhabited mainly by the Ekiti Yoruba people, who speak the Yagba dialect of Yoruba. Christianity is the predominant religion, alongside smaller Muslim and traditional belief communities. Community leadership is headed by the Oluroke of Ejuku within a traditional chieftaincy structure.

== Education and infrastructure ==
Ejuku has public primary schools and a community secondary school serving local residents. Electricity supply is available through the national grid with supplementary use of generators and solar power. Mobile telecommunications services are accessible, and the village is connected to neighbouring communities by laterite roads linking to regional routes in Yagba East.
