= Oranre =

Settlement in Yagba East, Kogi State

- Village
- Location within Nigeria
- Coordinates: 8°07′45″N 5°41′25″E
- Country: Nigeria
- State: Kogi State
- LGA: Yagba East
- Time zone: UTC+1 (WAT)
- Postal code: 262102

Oranre is a village in the Yagba East Local Government Area of Kogi State, Nigeria. It is one of the dispersed rural communities that make up the Yagba upland region.

== Physical features ==
The settlement occupies a landscape of mixed woodland and grassland. The area is interspersed with farms and small water channels that support seasonal cultivation.

== Main occupations ==
Farming provides the principal source of livelihood. Common crops include yam, cassava, maize, sorghum and cashew. Informal trading, especially in farm produce, supplements household earnings.

== Population and culture ==
The inhabitants are mainly speakers of the Yagba variety of the Yoruba language. Christianity dominates religious life, while traditional practices are retained in aspects of community identity.

== Local amenities ==
The village maintains road access to neighboring communities, with mobile networks offering telecommunication services. Educational facilities in the vicinity cater to primary-level learners.
