= Saka Isau =

Nigerian politician (1955–2025)

Saka Isau SAN

Attorney General and Commissioner of Justice
- In office 4 September 2003 – 23 March 2011

SSG to Kwara State

Personal details
- Born: Saka Abimbola Isau; March 1955
- Died: 4 January 2025 (aged 69) Ilorin, Kwara State, Nigeria

Saka Abimbola Isau SAN (March 1955 – 4 January 2025) was a Nigerian lawyer and politician who served as Secretary to the State Government, Commissioner for Justice and Attorney General of Kwara State during the tenure of Bukola Saraki.

Isau was a member of the People's Democratic Party and contested the party's governorship ticket in the 2019 general election, alongside Bolaji Abdullahi.

Isau served as the 14th chairman of Nigerian Bar Association Ilorin branch between 2000 and 2001. He died on 4 January 2025, at the age of 69.
