= Isao Kubota =

Japanese footballer

Personal information
- Date of birth: 22 May 1983 (age 43)
- Place of birth: Saitama, Japan
- Height: 1.76 m (5 ft 9 1/2 in)
- Position: Midfielder

Team information
- Current team: Samut Songkhram
- Number: 17

Youth career
- Kokushikan University

Senior career*
Years	Team	Apps	(Gls)
2002–2005	Kokushikan University	16	(0)
2006–2008	Tochigi S.C.	54	(4)
2009	Giravanz Kitakyushu	8	(0)
2010–	Samut Songkhram	9	(0)
- * Club domestic league appearances and goals as of 22 April 2010

Isao Kubota (久保田 勲, Isao Kubota; born 22 May 1983 in Saitama) is a Japanese footballer who plays for Samut Songkhram in Thai Premier League.
