= Isao Okazaki =

Japanese political activist

- 岡崎 功
- Born: Isao Okazaki (岡崎 允佐夫); 1920; Shimane Prefecture, Japan
- Died: 2006 (aged 85–86)
- Occupations: Right-wing activist, educator
- Known for: Causing the Matsue Incident in 1945

Isao Okazaki (岡崎 功, Okazaki Isao; 1920–2006) was a Japanese right-wing activist who caused the Matsue Incident in 1945.

== Early years ==
He was born Isao Okazaki (岡崎 允佐夫, Okazaki Isao) in Shimane Prefecture in 1920. He graduated from Matsue Middle School in 1939 (now Shimane Prefectural Matsue Secondary High School). He worked at the Shenyang branch of Mitsui & Co., Manchuria for two years and developed an interest in Japanese nationalism. In November 1942, he returned to Japan and he entered Rissho University with the objective of becoming a monk.

== Political involvement ==
Okazaki became a member of ultra-nationalist group Kinno Makotomusubi. With his own money, he built a house in Meguro, Tokyo. He discussed the news of Japanese reverses in the war with his friends. He suggested that the ruling military Hideki Tojo Cabinet be overthrown.

They tried to obtain weapons for this purpose. When the authorities became aware of the plot in July 1943, Okazaki was arrested. He was given two years of imprisonment with three years of suspension in September He was released from prison in November under the surveillance of Tokubetsu Koto Keisatsu (political police).

After returning to Matsue, he was employed by the Government mobilization office. Because Okazaki sympathized with the families of soldiers, he was in frequent conflict with his superiors. He was ordered to select 75 women to work at the Kure Naval Arsenal, but realized that women of higher status were not part of the selection pool, and leaked this fact. He was forced to resign. He then became a member of Dai Nippon Genron Hokokukai, a right-wing party.

== After release from prison ==
After his release from prison, Okazaki entered the lumber business in Matsue City. He took care of those who had been imprisoned for the war. A right-wing organization, Seinen Kodotai (Young Pro-emperor organization) formed with him as its leader. In December 1956, the National Union (of right wing organizations) was formed with him as the leader of the Shimane Branch. The group never had more than a small following. In 1961, Okazaki established the juridical educational organization, Shona Gakuen, and assumed the post of director. In 1968, he ran unsuccessfully for the Upper House in the Diet of Japan.

He died in 2006.
