= Andrew Esiebo =

Nigerian photographer

Andrew Esiebo (born 1978) is a Nigerian photographer. He has covered personal projects and assignments on primarily Nigeria and West Africa but has gained international recognition.

Beginning his career as a freelance photographer, his work has covered the rapid development of urban Nigeria and various social issues such as sexuality, gender politics, football, popular culture, and immigration. His work has evolved beyond freelance photography and has begun exploring video and multimedia work.

== Early life ==
Esiebo was born in Lagos, Nigeria. Given a camera in 2000 as a gift by his friend Jose Maria, Esiebo began teaching himself photography and began photographing the rapid development of Urban Nigeria. Thereafter, Esiebo began internet correspondences with a U.S. based photographer, Paul Udstrand, who gave him his first sets of photography books. Esiebo also tried black and white photography with his uncle, Esiebo Joseph who is a commercial photographer in Ibadan, in which he assisted in processing black and white images in his darkroom.

== Career ==
Esiebo lives and works primarily out of Ibadan, Nigeria, but his career has blossomed beyond West Africa and has reached international attention. He is a member of the Participating Artist Press Agency and has his works on the Nigerian Landscape and Culture are featured extensively in the Lagos Lab and the Migrationpapa. He is the initiator and co-organizer of "My Eye, My World", a participatory photography workshop for socially excluded children in Nigeria.

Currently Esiebo is a freelance photographer for organisations locally and abroad, including Photoblogs Magazine; USA Voiceworks magazine, Australia; United Nations Global Report on Human Settlements, Laia Libros; Spain, European Press Agency; West Africa, and Time Out Nigeria. He is a founding member of Nigeria's photojournalism collective, Black Box, Nigeria. The collective is made up photographers of varied age and education throughout Africa in which members have engaged in many artistic activities, either individually or in collaboration with groups. Esiebo is a part of the Progress of Love, a collaborative project between the Menil Collection, Houston; Centre for Contemporary Art, Lagos; and the Pulitzer Arts Foundation, St. Louis.

Esiebo has also had his photos published in books, magazine and websites such as guardian.co.uk, Marie Claire Italia, Time Out Nigeria, Mail & Guardian online, Laia Books, Geo-Lino, KIT and African style magazine Arise.

== Residencies ==
Esiebo has completed a number of artistic residencies including a five-month stay in Paris under Cultures France's Visa Pour Creation, a three-month residency at the Gasworks in London as part of the Africa Beyond programme and a three-month residency at the Gyeonggi Creation Center in South Korea December 2011.

In 2008, Esiebo, released the ongoing exhibition Eyes from South to West that was part of a residency in London initiated by Africa Beyond in partnership with Gasworks International Residency Programme, in association with The Photographers' Gallery. The exhibition explores the experiences of individuals and families who migrated from Nigeria to Europe through photography and audio interviews. The exhibition sought to expose the tensions between the dreams of starting a new life abroad and the realities that occur alongside. The project builds on Esiebo's approach to documentary photography which focuses on building relationships and trust to produce a genuine involvement with his surroundings.

== Awards ==
In 2007, Esiebo won a Cultures France (now Institut Français) Visa pour la Creation Award and began exploring other avenues of photojournalism with his first video and multimedia work titled “Living Queer African” which highlights the life of a young gay Cameroonian living in Paris.

In 2011 Eseibo also won the 2011 Artistic Creation prize by the Musee du Quai Branly, Paris. He used the award to embark on a photographic exploration titled Pride which documented the phenomenon of men's hairdressers in the countries of west Africa: Nigeria, Benin, Ghana, Ivory Coast, Liberia, Mali, Senegal and Mauritania. Esiebo explores the profession of hairdresser as hair styles and techniques provide a significant contribution to the construction of individual and collective identities in West Africa. Esiebo explores the role played by hairdressing salons in social mobility, and the manner in which the sector functions as a point of convergence between people from all backgrounds.

== International exhibitions ==
In November 2006, Esiebo's works on Nigeria Culture and Natural Heritage were published in by Laia Libros, Barcelona, Spain in collaboration with UNESCO titled Lagos: Life goes on and was also featured in an exhibition in Syria titled Meetings in the Middle East.

He also was highlighted in the Noorderlicht Photography Festival. His photos were displayed as part of the Acts of Faith in the 2007 festival.

In 2009 Esiebo was featured as a guest speaker in the Chobi Mela V Photo Festival in Bangladesh.

In 2010 Esiebo was selected for the World Press Photography Dream project of 16 journalists who were to provide alternative narratives to the World Cup in South Africa. His collection "Alter Gogo" took a different approach to the global phenomenon of the Soccer World Cup in South Africa 2010. In visiting a shanty town near Johannesburg, Orange Fam, he met a soccer team made up of grandmothers: the Gogo Getters. His series juxtaposed images of the elderly women in their home with their grandchildren contrasting with images of them in their soccer outfits on their home pitch. This series contradicts the images of elderly South Africans as it directly challenges the ideas of sports and leisure as belonging only to the youthful generation and places a sense of agency within women who too often are disregarded within the sports community as well. Esiebo's work was with Alter Gogo was therefore exhibited for the first time in France in Photoquai 2011. This exhibition was also on display at the 11th Havana Biennial in [Cuba].

In 2011, his work was on display titled "Sharon Stone of Abuja", at Location One Gallery in New York City. This exhibition sought to explore and re-imagine "Nollywood" – i.e. the Nigerian video film industry. Nollywood first emerged nearly 20 years ago and has rapidly grown to become the third largest film industry in the world after Hollywood and Bollywood. Sharon Stone in Abuja – named after a famous Nollywood film – was an attempt to reveal the psychodrama of Nigerian life and a visual homage to the emotional and psychological landscape of Africa.

In 2012 Esiebo produced a series on the 2012 Olympics in London titled The Games: Inspiring Images, Lens on Twelve, London. Lens on Twelve was an exhibition that sought to shift the focus of the Olympic Games to the other side of the event, onto artists of other nationalities. The artists were asked to reflect on how they felt about the global event in a single photographic work. For this Esiebo produce the Soccer World Series. Esiebo discussed how soccer is more than just a game in Nigeria: it is a venue that unites people regardless of their socio-economic status. This series demonstrate that the game is not confined to stadiums and formal matches in Nigeria, but is unfolding on beaches, public spaces, etc.

In August 2015, Esiebo was featured on Instagram's official account.

== Multimedia / film ==
In 2007, Esiebo won a Cultures France (now Institut Francais) Visa pour la Creation Award and began exploring other avenues of photojournalism with his first video and multimedia work titled "Living Queer African" which highlights the life of a young gay Cameroonian living in Paris.

In 2011, Esiebo released another multimedia film titled Barbara Encounter. The film is of a sex worker from Lusaka, Zambia. The film narrates the live of one of many women in Zambia who work the streets to provide a better life for their families. Esiebo narrates her life story through a synopsis of intimate portraits that depict the woman's life both on and off the streets to give a more holistic approach to the lives of Zambian sex workers.

In 2013, Esiebo furthered his multimedia career in his work on Enlarging the Kingdom which is a documentary film in partnership with Annalisa Bulttucci. The documentary delves into the influence of Africa Pentecostals in Italy which was screened on 23 April 2013. Enlarging the Kingdom explores the encounter, interactions, and conflicts between Catholicism and African Pentecostalism by putting in conversation Nigerian and Ghanaian Pastors and Catholic Priests. The documentary looks at their diverse understanding of evil forces, authorised and unauthorised forms of relating to the Divine, the making of idols and icons, and religious leadership and authority to offer an insight into the challenges of African Pentecostals in Italy and the role of Pentecostal Churches for African immigrant communities.

Another collaborative work with Annalisa Butticci a Crazy World Crazy Faith.

== Gallery ==
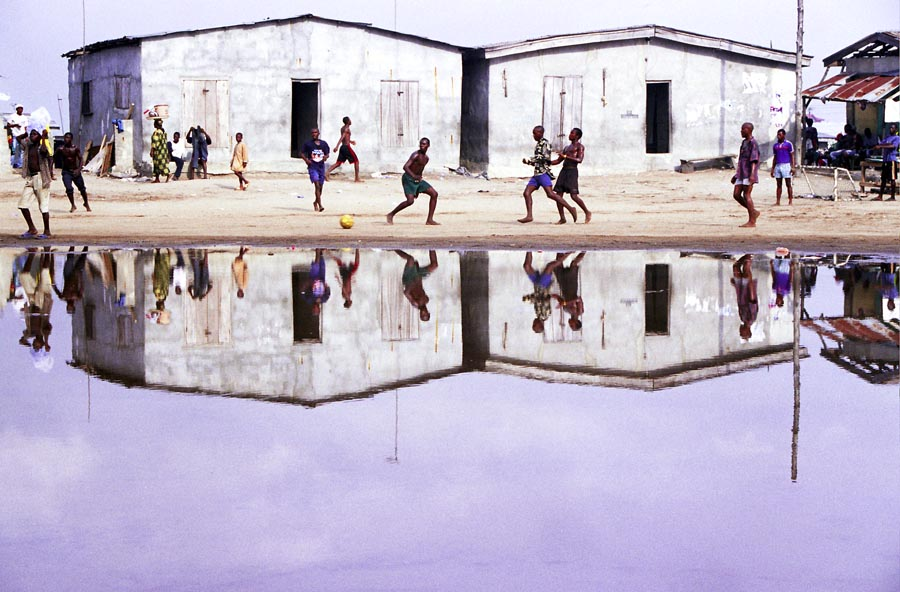
Informal Spaces

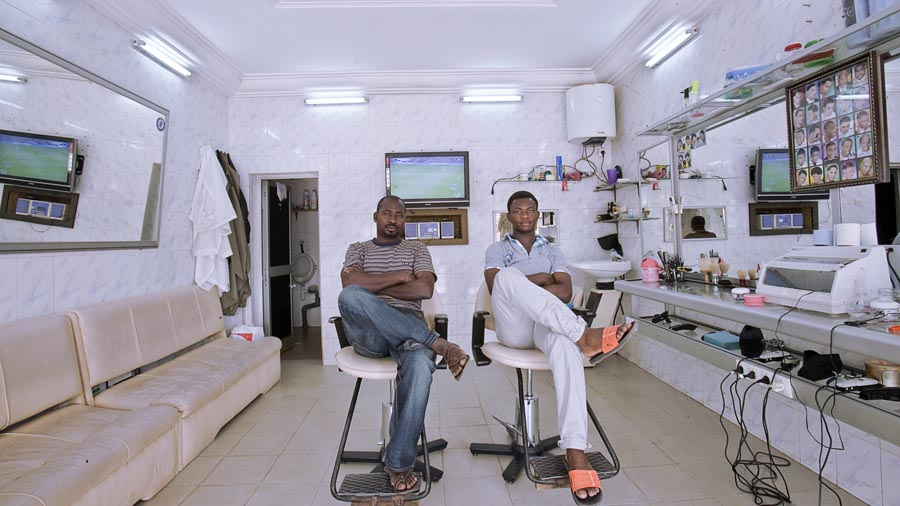
Mali Space

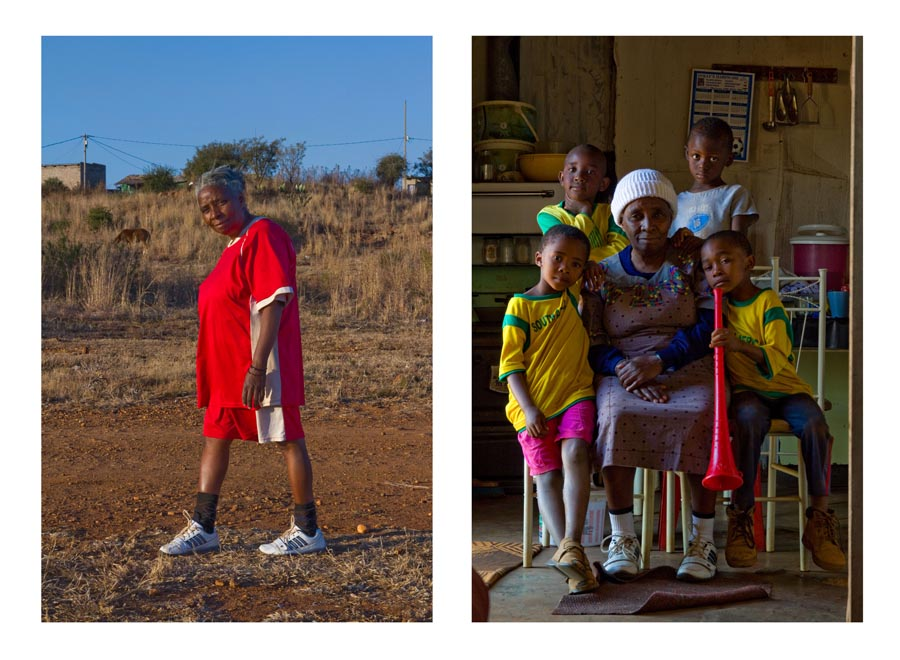
Alter Gogo

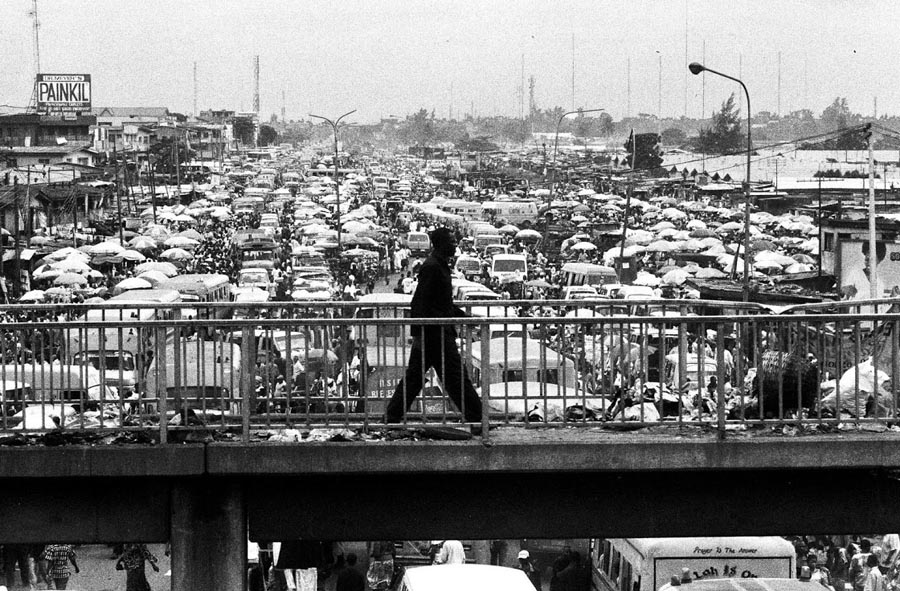
Lagos Life Goes On

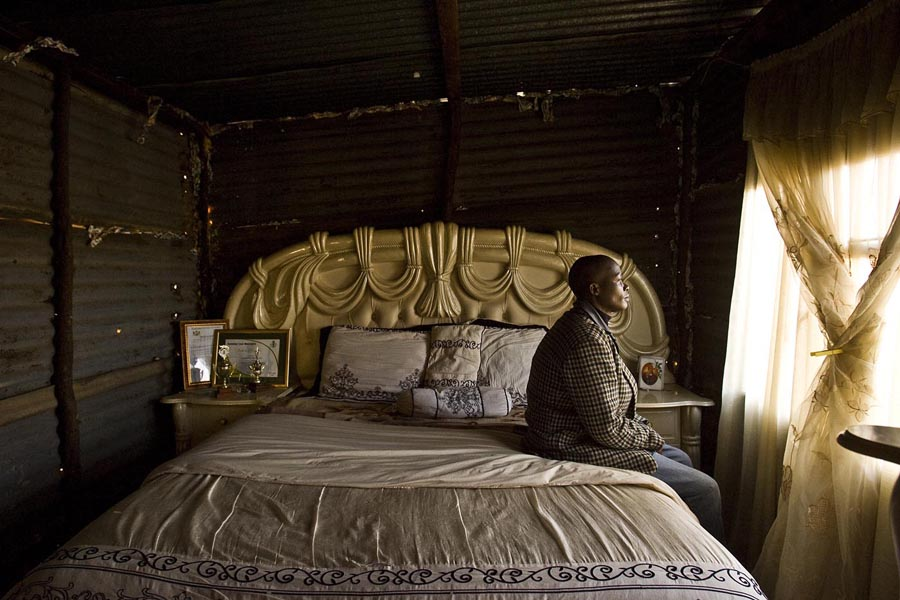
Living Positive

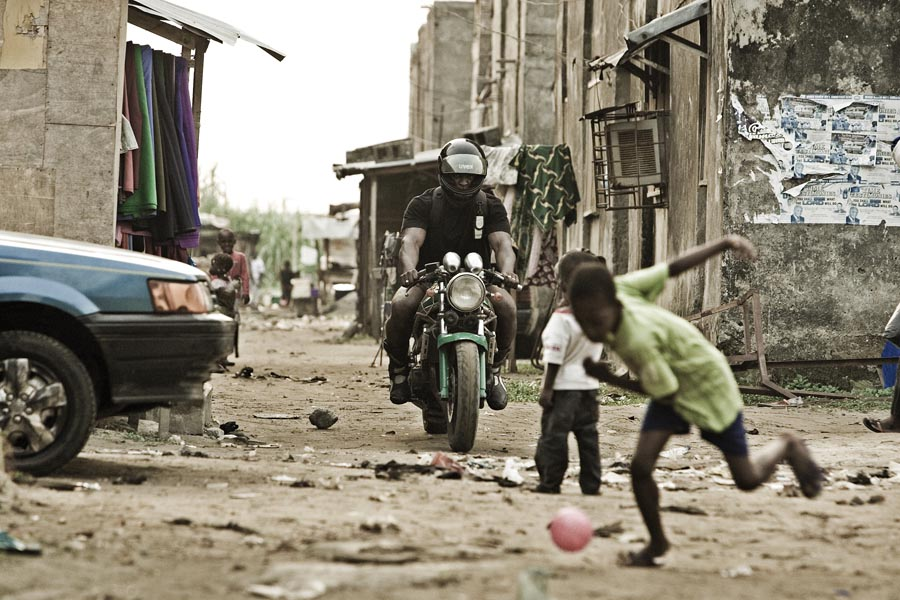
Members Only

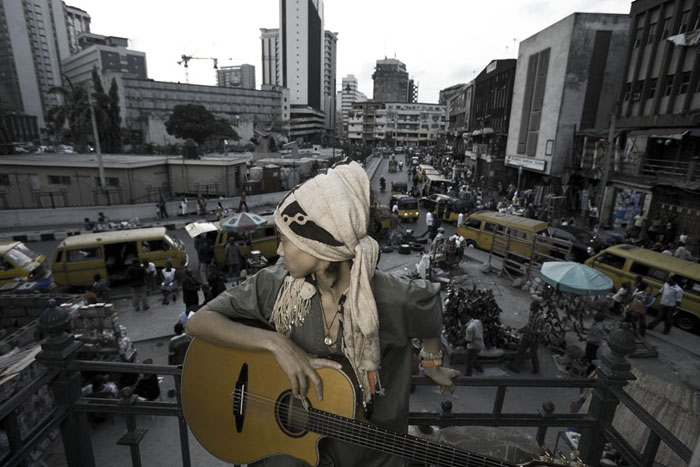
Nneka
