= Odafe Atogun =

Nigerian writer

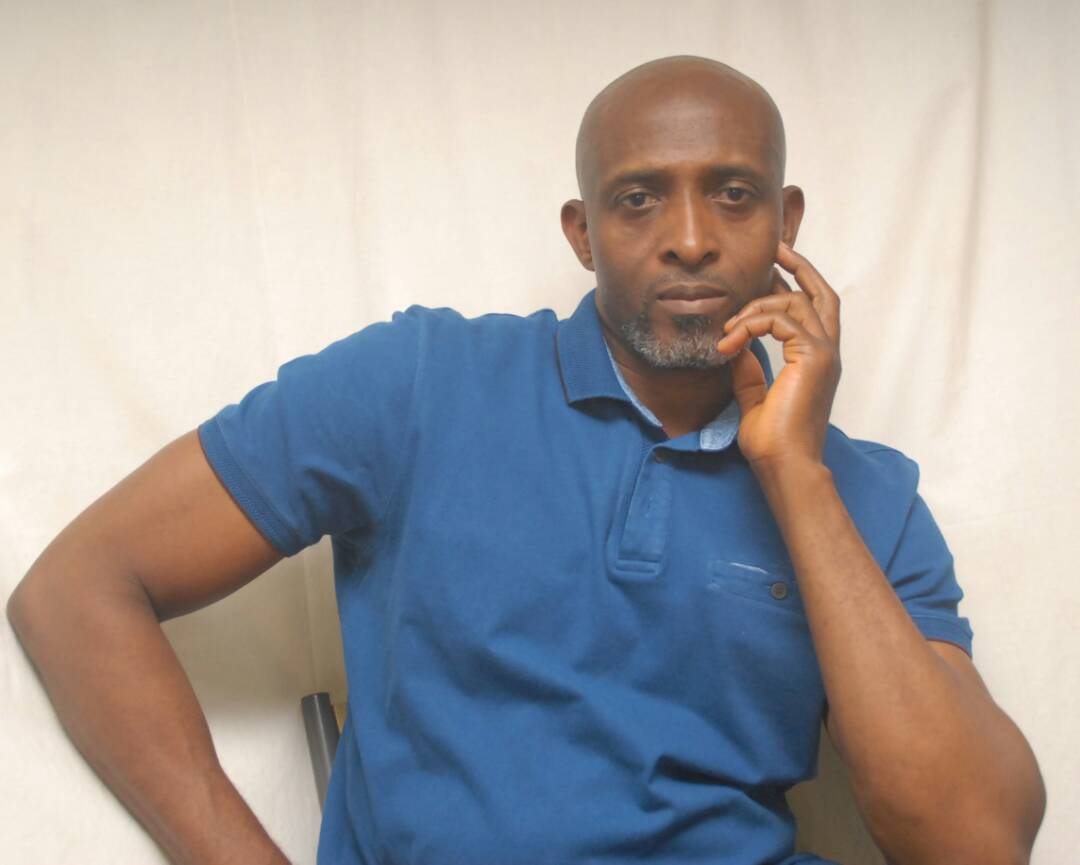
- Born: Lokoja, Nigeria
- Occupation: Writer
- Website: www.odafeatogun.com

Odafe Atogun is a Nigerian writer. His debut novel, Taduno's Song (2016), was selected for the BBC Radio 2 Book Club, and he has been compared to Franz Kafka and George Orwell in critical reviews. Following his two-book deal with Canongate, Penguin Random House and Arche Verlag, Atogun's second novel, Wake Me When I’m Gone, was published in 2017. His work has been translated into several languages.

== Life ==
Odafe Atogun was born in Nigeria, in the town of Lokoja. Living in difficult circumstances as a child, Atogun found escape through the power of his imagination, ultimately following the path to full-time writing. He says he writes at night "when the world is asleep."

His writings have been favourably compared to those of Franz Kafka, George Orwell and even Amos Tutuola

Atogun professes a desire to write timeless stories which transport the reader. Since the publication of his first book, he has taken keen interest in the work of Kafka. He is also influenced by the works of Milan Kundera, J. M. Coetzee, Ngugi wa Thiong’o, and Chinua Achebe.

He lives in Abuja. He has a son from a previous relationship, to whom he dedicated his first book.

== Taduno's Song ==
Atogun's first book,Taduno's Song, was published by Canongate. It is a "Kafkaesque tale" that "imagines such a post-colonial dystopia". It tells the story of the eponymous Taduno whom the author says he modelled around the late Afrobeat musician Fela Kuti.

Of the book, this has been said: "One would be hard pressed to find a tale as beautifully written and thoroughly engaging." It is " a fine, allusive challenge to the dictators who infest Africa—and the world," a book that "is a rich, multilayered work, exploring lessons of freedom, self-worth, forgiveness and faithfulness." Indirect Libre calls it "a wholly engrossing, impressive debut by a writer who has taken the force of multiple influences and wielded them with an uncommon grace and lightness."

The book was listed as one of the Guardian's "Hidden gems of 2016: the best books you may have missed".

The Nigerian edition was published by Ouida Books.

== Wake Me When I'm Gone ==
Atogun's second book was published by Canongate in 2017. It has been described as "timeless", "magical" and "a powerful story of one woman's fight for change and independence, despite the obstacles", combining "folkloric elements with a strong central character to create a haunting and unusual narrative." It "proves a deeply satisfying and delightful, read." It is "a quiet power and message of faith and hope that will stay with you long after you turn over the last page."

Emily Roberts of Student Newspaper says the author "successfully portrays the corruption within this town which, though fictional, echoes recognisable themes in the contemporary world, as oppressive laws by patriarchal figures disregard women's rights in many cultures" offering "a critique of conservative, backwards societies and demonstrates the power of individuals to defy outdated tradition.

It was published in Nigeria by Ouida Books in 2018.
