= Ayobola Kekere-Ekun =

Nigerian contemporary visual artist

- Born: 1993 (age 32–33); Lagos, Nigeria
- Education: University of Lagos (BA, MA) University of Johannesburg (PhD)
- Occupation: Artist
- Style: Quilling
- Awards: Absa L'Atelier Award (2021); The Future Awards, Prize for Creativity (2018); University of Lagos Convocation Prize (2014); United States Consulate General 'Women's History Month' Art Contest (2012);
- Website: https://ayobolakekere-ekun.com/

Ayobola Kekere-Ekun is a Nigerian contemporary visual artist.

== Life ==
Ayobola Kekere-Ekun was born in 1993 in Lagos, Nigeria. She had an interest in art from a very young age, which was nurtured through classes and support from her parents. Kekere-Ekun finished a degree in Graphic Design at the University of Lagos (UNILAG), Akoka in 2009 and also received her Master's Degree in the same field in 2016. She is the Assistant Lecturer in the Department of Creative Arts at the University of Lagos.

In 2022, Kekere-Ekun was finishing her Ph.D., which she began in 2018, in Art and Design at the University of Johannesburg, South Africa.

== Artistic practice ==
Kekere-Ekun combines her fascination of linear patterns with a method called paper quilling, a meticulous process that takes extensive time to complete. She mainly uses this technique to form the intricate visual aesthetic that is seen in her work. Her works highlight the themes of Nigerian femininity across historical and contemporary context, alongside other personal themes that are particular to her social and geographical experiences. In addition to femininity, her art also explores the practical effects of mythology, power dynamics, and equality within Nigerian social spaces that may be prejudiced toward women.

Kekere-Ekun has exhibited her work at Rele Art Gallery in Lagos, Nigeria (2019); Guns & Rain, Johannesburg, South Africa (2019) and No End Contemporary Art Space (2019) in Johannesburg, South Africa and The Koppel Project Hive (2018) in London, England.

=== Select exhibitions ===
- 2020: Young Contemporaries Alumni Group Show (January), Rele Gallery, Lagos
- 2019: Resilient Lines, Rele Gallery, Lagos, April (Solo)
- 2019: Suffrage, Guns and Rains, Johannesburg, July
- 2019: Imagine the Opposite, No End Contemporary, Johannesburg, May
- 2018: Cu-ulture and Tradition: Same Experience, Different Local, Koppel Project Hive, London, October
- 2017: Her Story, Rele Gallery, Lagos, February

=== Art Fairs ===
- 2018: Kekere-Ekun participated in ArtX Lagos,
- 2019: West Africa's first international art fair, her works were shown in both Latitude art fair and Turbine Art Fair in Johannesburg, South Africa.

=== Art magazines ===
- 2021: Featured in the "Artafrica" magazine

== Reviews ==
In 2019, Kekere-Ekun's solo exhibition "Resilient Lines" was displayed at Rele Art Gallery. It engaged with themes relating to the politics of femininity in Nigeria, and became part of a broader conversation about contemporary Nigerian art. Her work is created during a time where there is increasing attention to documenting the contributions of the female artists in Nigeria, whose legacies have often been disregarded in the past. Overall, her art is recognized as part of ongoing efforts in contributing to the Nigerian art community that seeks to celebrate female artists in the country.

== Honors ==
Kekere-Ekun received a prize in 2018 for Creativity from The Future Awards Africa (TFAA). In the same year, she also received a $5,000 grant by music producer, Swizz Beats and musician, Alicia Keys, which she used to fund her solo exhibition, "Resilient Lines" at Rele Art Gallery in Lagos, Nigeria. In 2016, she received a grant from The Rele Art Foundation, as part of their "Young Contemporaries" program. Other awards she has received are the University of Lagos Convocation Prize in 2014 and the United States Consulate General 'Women's History Month' Art Contest in 2012. Ayobola Kekere-Ekun has been selected as one of the winners of the 2021 "Absa L'Atelier.'
