= Wana Udobang =

Nigerian poet and broadcaster

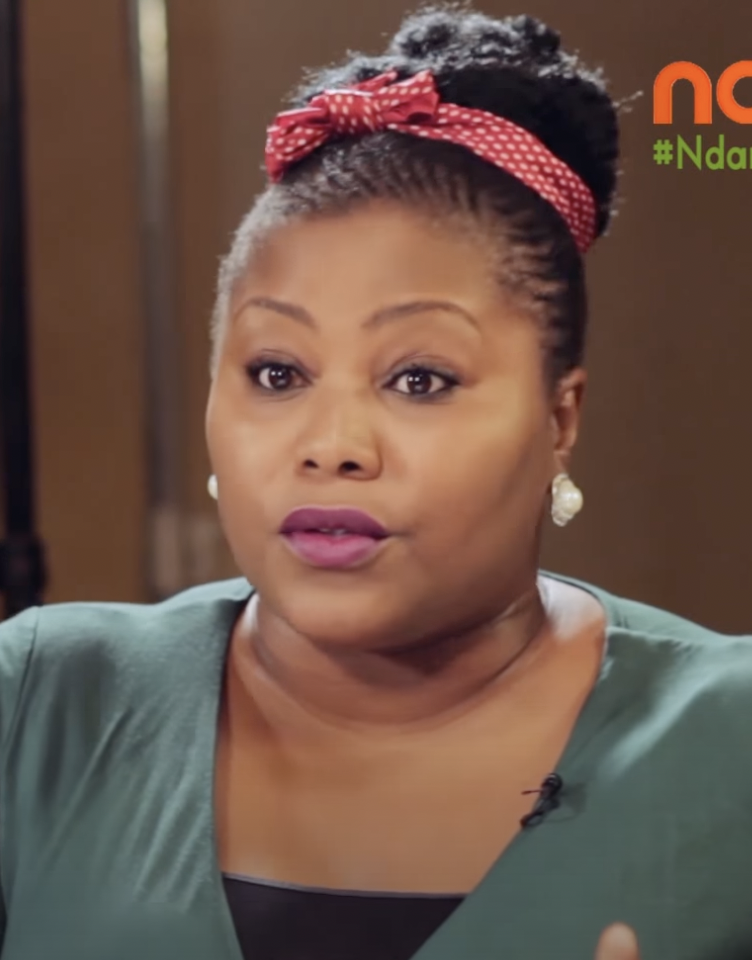
- Born: Lagos, Nigeria
- Other names: Wana Wana
- Citizenship: Nigerian
- Education: first-class degree in journalism
- Alma mater: University for the Creative Arts
- Occupations: Poet, broadcaster, journalist

Wana Udobang, also known as Wana Wana, is a Nigerian writer, poet, journalist, filmmaker, and television personality. Her work has appeared on the BBC, Al Jazeera, Huffington Post, BellaNaija, and The Guardian, She has been described as "one of the biggest champions of our new spoken word renaissance is taking a leap into the void."

== Biography and career ==
Born in Lagos, Nigeria, Udobang graduated with a first-class degree in journalism from the University for the Creative Arts. After graduation, she worked for the BBC World Service as a freelance features producer. She also worked as a researcher at Wise Buddah Productions, Above the Title Productions, and Somethin' Else. On her return to Lagos, she worked at 92.3 Inspiration FM in Lagos, Nigeria, for six years as a radio presenter and producer.

Her fiction and poetry have been published in Brittle Paper and other places online and in print. She is an alumnus of the Farafina Creative Writers Workshop held annually by Chimamanda Ngozi Adichie.

As a performance poet, she has performed around Nigeria. Her first spoken-word album, released in 2013, was titled Dirty Laundry.

In 2017, she released a second album, titled In Memory of Forgetting. The album has been described as "incredibly brave", a "feminist dog whistle" that revolves "almost entirely around the resilience women, their triumphs and struggles, their trauma and epiphanies. Udobang describes it as "a collection of memories navigating experiences that range from places of brokenness and questioning to self renewal."

In 2020, Wana was selected to participate in the 54th International Writing Program Fall Residency at the University of Iowa, courtesy of the United States Department of State. To date, 35 Nigerian literary figures have participated in the IWP Fall Residency. Notable among them are Elechi Amadi (1973), Cyprian Ekwensi (1974), Ola Rotimi (1980), Femi Osofisan (1986), Niyi Osundare (1988), Festus Iyayi (1990), Lola Shoneyin (1999), Obari Gomba (2016) and Tade Ipadeola (2019).
