= List of winners and nominated authors of the Nigerian Prize for Literature =

The following is a list of winners and shortlisted authors of the Nigeria Prize for Literature. The prize has been awarded each year since 2004 to the best original full-length novel, written in the English language, by a citizen of Nigeria.

== Winners, shortlists and longlists ==
Year	Award	Author	Title	Judges
2026	Winner	Ogaga Ifowodo	Why Does God Need a Gun?	Akachi Adimora-Ezeigbo
2026	Shortlist	James Ngwu Eze	Unbind Me Now	Akachi Adimora-Ezeigbo
2026	Shortlist	Tares Oburumu	Flora's Love Colony	Akachi Adimora-Ezeigbo
2026	Longlist	Saddiq Dzikogi	Bakandamiya: An Elegy	Akachi Adimora-Ezeigbo
2026	Longlist	Tanure Ojaide	Adult Love	Akachi Adimora-Ezeigbo
2026	Longlist	Paul Akpomuje	Black Passport	Akachi Adimora-Ezeigbo
2026	Longlist	Ajibola Tolase	2000s Blacks	Akachi Adimora-Ezeigbo
2026	Longlist	Ayo Oyeku	Corpus: Animistic Verses	Akachi Adimora-Ezeigbo
2026	Longlist	Theresa Lola	Ceremony for the Nameless	Akachi Adimora-Ezeigbo
2026	Longlist	Rasaq Malik Gbolahan	The Origin of Wounds	Akachi Adimora-Ezeigbo
2026	Longlist	Adedayo Agarau	The Years of Blood	Akachi Adimora-Ezeigbo
2025	Winner	Oyin Olugbile	Sanya	Saeedat Bolajoko Aliyu; Stephen Mbanefo Ogene; Olakunle Kasumu
2025	Shortlist	Chigozie Obioma	The Road to the Country	Saeedat Bolajoko Aliyu; Stephen Mbanefo Ogene; Olakunle Kasumu
2025	Shortlist	Nikki May	This Motherless Land	Saeedat Bolajoko Aliyu; Stephen Mbanefo Ogene; Olakunle Kasumu
2025	Longlist	Yewande Omotoso	An Unusual Grief	Saeedat Bolajoko Aliyu; Stephen Mbanefo Ogene; Olakunle Kasumu
2025	Longlist	Linda Masi	Fine Dreams	Saeedat Bolajoko Aliyu; Stephen Mbanefo Ogene; Olakunle Kasumu
2025	Longlist	Michael Afenfia	Leave My Bones in Saskatoon	Saeedat Bolajoko Aliyu; Stephen Mbanefo Ogene; Olakunle Kasumu
2025	Longlist	Uwem Akpan	New York My Village	Saeedat Bolajoko Aliyu; Stephen Mbanefo Ogene; Olakunle Kasumu
2025	Longlist	Ayo Oyeku	Petrichor, The Scent of a New Beginning	Saeedat Bolajoko Aliyu; Stephen Mbanefo Ogene; Olakunle Kasumu
2025	Longlist	Chika Unigwe	The Middle Daughter	Saeedat Bolajoko Aliyu; Stephen Mbanefo Ogene; Olakunle Kasumu
2025	Longlist	Chioma Okereke	Water Baby	Saeedat Bolajoko Aliyu; Stephen Mbanefo Ogene; Olakunle Kasumu
2025	Longlist	Abubakar Adam Ibrahim	When We Were Fireflies	Saeedat Bolajoko Aliyu; Stephen Mbanefo Ogene; Olakunle Kasumu
2024	Winner	Olubunmi Familoni	The Road Does Not End	Saleh Abdu; Vicky Sylvester; Igudia Osarobu; Akachi Adimora-Ezeigbo; Olu Obafemi; Ahmed Yerima; Christopher Okemwa
2024	Shortlist	Ndidi Chiazor-Enenmo	A Father's Pride	Saleh Abdu; Vicky Sylvester; Igudia Osarobu; Akachi Adimora-Ezeigbo; Olu Obafemi; Ahmed Yerima; Christopher Okemwa
2024	Shortlist	Uchechukwu Peter Umezurike	Wish Maker	Saleh Abdu; Vicky Sylvester; Igudia Osarobu; Akachi Adimora-Ezeigbo; Olu Obafemi; Ahmed Yerima; Christopher Okemwa
2024	Longlist	Jumoke Verissimo	Grandma and the Moon's Hidden Secret	Saleh Abdu; Vicky Sylvester; Igudia Osarobu; Akachi Adimora-Ezeigbo; Olu Obafemi; Ahmed Yerima; Christopher Okemwa
2024	Longlist	Henry Akubuiro	Mighty Mite and Golden Jewel	Saleh Abdu; Vicky Sylvester; Igudia Osarobu; Akachi Adimora-Ezeigbo; Olu Obafemi; Ahmed Yerima; Christopher Okemwa
2024	Longlist	Temiloluwa Adeshina	Risi Recycle–The Dustbin Girl	Saleh Abdu; Vicky Sylvester; Igudia Osarobu; Akachi Adimora-Ezeigbo; Olu Obafemi; Ahmed Yerima; Christopher Okemwa
2024	Longlist	Olatunbosun Taofeek	The Children at the IDP Camp	Saleh Abdu; Vicky Sylvester; Igudia Osarobu; Akachi Adimora-Ezeigbo; Olu Obafemi; Ahmed Yerima; Christopher Okemwa
2024	Longlist	Ayo Oyeku	The Magic Jalabiya	Saleh Abdu; Vicky Sylvester; Igudia Osarobu; Akachi Adimora-Ezeigbo; Olu Obafemi; Ahmed Yerima; Christopher Okemwa
2024	Longlist	Hyginus Ekwuazi	The Third Side of a Coin	Saleh Abdu; Vicky Sylvester; Igudia Osarobu; Akachi Adimora-Ezeigbo; Olu Obafemi; Ahmed Yerima; Christopher Okemwa
2024	Longlist	Anietie Usen	Village Boy	Saleh Abdu; Vicky Sylvester; Igudia Osarobu; Akachi Adimora-Ezeigbo; Olu Obafemi; Ahmed Yerima; Christopher Okemwa
2024	Longlist	Akanni Festus Olaniyi	Bode's Birthday Party	Saleh Abdu; Vicky Sylvester; Igudia Osarobu; Akachi Adimora-Ezeigbo; Olu Obafemi; Ahmed Yerima; Christopher Okemwa
2023	Obari Gomba	Grit	Drama	
2022	Romeo Oriogun	Nomad	Poetry	
2020/2021	Cheluchi Onyemelukwe	The Son of the House	Prose	
2019	Jude Idada	Boom Boom	Children's Literature	
2018	Soji Cole	Embers	Drama	
2017	Ikeogu Oke	The Heresiad	Poetry	
2016	Abubakar Adam Ibrahim	Season of Crimson Blossoms	Prose	
2015			Children's literature	No winner (Note: Out of 109 shortlisted books, no winner emerges. The prize money was then used to fund a workshop for children’s literature authors later in the year.)
2014	Sam Ukala	Iredi War	Drama	
2013	Tade Ipadeola	The Sahara Testaments	Poetry	
2012	Chika Unigwe	On Black Sisters Street	Prose	
2011	Adeleke Adeyemi	The Missing Clock	Children's literature	
2010	Esiaba Irobi	Cemetery Road	Drama	Posthumous (Note: Dr Esiaba Irobi, won the prize with his play Cemetery Road. However he died after submitting the work.)
2009			Poetry	No winner
2008	Kaine Agary	Yellow Yellow	Prose	
2007 (Shared prize)	Mabel Segun	Readers' Theatre: Twelve Plays for Young People	Children's literature	
2007 (Shared prize)	Akachi Adimora-Ezeigbo	My Cousin Sammy	Children's literature	
2006	Ahmed Yerima	Hard Ground	Drama	
2005 (Shared prize)	Gabriel Okara	The Dreamer: His Vision	Poetry	
2005 (Shared prize)	Ezenwa Ohaeto	Chants of Minstrel	Poetry	
2004			Prose	No winner
