= List of Nigerian novelists =

This page is a list of novelists born in or associated with the African country of Nigeria.

== A ==
- Chris Abani (born 1966)
- Chinua Achebe (1930–2013)
- Ayobami Adebayo (born 1988)
- Bayo Adebowale (born 1944)
- Abimbola Adelakun (living)
- Tomi Adeyemi (born 1993)
- Chimamanda Ngozi Adichie (born 1977)
- Tolu Ajayi (born 1946)
- Lola Akande (born 1965)
- Uwem Akpan (born 1971)
- Hauwa Ali (died 1995)
- Zaynab Alkali (born 1950)
- T. M. Aluko (1918–2010)
- Elechi Amadi (1934–2016)
- Karen King-Aribisala (living)
- Lesley Nneka Arimah (born 1983)
- Sefi Atta (born 1964)
- Adaeze Atuegwu (born 1977)

== B ==
- Rotimi Babatunde (living)
- Biyi Bandele (1967–2022)
- A. Igoni Barrett (born 1979)
- Lindsay Barrett (born 1941)
- Simi Bedford (living)
- Philip Begho (born 1956)
- Natasha Bowen (living)
- Oyinkan Braithwaite (born 1988)
- Stephen Buoro (born 1993)

== C ==
- Chin Ce (born 1966)
- Teju Cole (born 1975)

== D ==
- Abi Daré (living)
- Jude Dibia (born 1975)

== E ==
- Obi Egbuna (1938–2014)
- Cyprian Ekwensi (1921–2007)
- Buchi Emecheta (1944–2017)
- Rosemary Esehagu (born 1981)

== F ==
- Daniel Olorunfemi Fagunwa (1903–1963)
- Adebayo Faleti (1921–2017)
- Dan Fulani, pseudonym of John Hare (1934–2022)
- Bilkisu Funtuwa (living)

== G ==
- Abubakar Gimba (1952–2015)

== H ==
- Helon Habila (born 1967)

== I ==
- Abubakar Adam Ibrahim (born 1979)
- Emmanuel Iduma (born 1989)
- Jordan Ifueko (born 1993)
- Jane Igharo (living)
- Eghosa Imasuen (born 1976)
- Uzodinma Iweala (born 1982)
- Festus Iyayi (1947–2013)

== J ==
- Elnathan John (born 1982)

== K ==
- Yejide Kilanko (born 1975)

== M ==
- Oliver Mbamara (living)
- Sebastian Okechukwu Mezu (born 1941)
- John Munonye (1929–1999)

== N ==
- Okey Ndibe (born 1960)
- Uche Nduka (born 1963)
- Martina Nwakoby (born 1937)
- Nkem Nwankwo (1936–2001)
- Flora Nwapa (1931–1993)
- Adaobi Tricia Nwaubani (born 1976)
- Onyeka Nwelue (born 1988)
- Chuma Nwokolo (born 1963)

== O ==
- Chigozie Obioma (born 1986)
- Aiwanose Odafen (living)
- Ude Odilora
- Taiwo Odubiyi (born 1965)
- Timothy Ogene (born 1984)
- Gabriel Okara (1921–2019)
- Oladejo Okediji (1929–2019)
- Chioma Okereke (living)
- Nnedi Okorafor (born 1974)
- Ifeoma Okoye (born 1937)
- Chinelo Okparanta (born 1981)
- Isidore Okpewho (1941–2016)
- Ben Okri (born 1959)
- Ukamaka Olisakwe (born 1982)
- Simbo Olorunfemi (living)
- Paul Oluikpe (living)
- Kole Omotoso (1943–2023)
- Yewande Omotoso (born 1980)
- Nuzo Onoh (born 1962)
- Osonye Tess Onwueme (born 1955)
- Ifeoma Onyefulu (born 1959)
- Cheluchi Onyemelukwe (living)
- Ola Opesan (born 1966)
- E. C. Osondu (living)
- Helen Ovbiagele (born 1944)
- Kachi A. Ozumba (living)

== P ==
- Olúmìdé Pópóọlá (living)

== R ==
- Ola Rotimi (1938–2000)

== S ==
- Abidemi Sanusi (living)
- Ken Saro-Wiwa (1941–1995)
- Mabel Segun (1930–2025)
- Taiye Selasi (born 1979)
- Lola Shoneyin (born 1974)
- Wole Soyinka (born 1934)

== T ==
- Efua Traoré (living)
- Amos Tutuola (1920–1997)

== U ==
- Gracy Ukala (born 1946)
- Adaora Lily Ulasi (1932–2016)
- Rems Umeasiegbu (born 1943)
- Chika Unigwe (born 1974)
- Pauline Uwakweh (living)

== V ==
- Jumoke Verissimo (born 1979)

== W ==
- Myne Whitman (born 1977)

== Y ==
- Balaraba Ramat Yakubu (born 1959)

== See also ==
- List of Nigerian writers
