= 2023 Nigeria Prize for Literature =

Nigerian literary award given in 2023

- Date: 11 October 2023
- Location: Eko Hotels and Suites, Lagos
- Country: Nigeria

The 2023 Nigeria Prize for Literature is a literary award worth US$100,000 given for the best English-language novel published by a Nigerian author. The winner, Obari Gomba for his play Grit, was announced on 11 October 2023 at Eko Hotels and Suites in Lagos.

Focused on drama, there were 143 entries during the submission space. The jury was chaired by Ameh Dennis Akoh, and others included Osita Catherine Ezenwanebe and Rasheedah Liman. On 31 July 2023, 11 books were longlisted and were announced by Akachi Adimora-Ezeigbo, the chairman of the advisory board.

On 23 August 2023, the shortlist was released and it contained only three books; Yamtarawala – The Warrior King by Henry Akubuiro, The Ojuelegba Crossroads by Abideen Abolaji Ojomu, and Grit by Obari Gomba. On 11 October 2023, the latter was announced as the winner.

== Nominees ==
indicates the winner
indicates shortlisted

Author	Title	Publisher
Abideen Abolaji Ojomu	The Ojuelegba Crossroads	
Ade Adeniji	Dance of the Sacred Feet	
Victor S. Dugga	Gidan Juju	
Cheta Igbokwe	Homecoming	
Chris Anyokwu	The Boat People	
Abuchi Modilim	The Brigadiers of a Mad Tribe	
Bode Sowande	The Spellbinder	
Obari Gomba	Grit	
Olubunmi Familoni	When Big Masquerades Dance Naked	
Olatunbosun Taofeek	Where Is Patient Zero	
Henry Akubuiro	Yamtarawala – The Warrior King	

== See also ==
- List of winners and nominated authors of the Nigerian Prize for Literature
