= Sueddie Agema =

Nigerian poet

Su'ur Su'eddie Vershima Agema is a Nigerian poet, editor and literary administrator. He is also a culture promoter. Author of two poetry collections, Bring our Casket Home: Tales one Shouldn’t Tell, and Home Equals Holes: Tale of an Exile, a short story collection, The Bottom of Another Tale and the NLNG Nigeria prize for literature 2022 nominated shortlisted book - Memory and the Call of Water. Agema is a past Chairman of the Association of Nigerian Authors (ANA) (Benue State Chapter) as well as Council Member, National Teen Authorship Scheme.

== Early life ==
He says, "I was exposed to Literature at an early age by a father who kept the tradition of the moonlight tales, complete with acting roles, local lore, and cultural songs. There was also a mother who bought the best of African literary titles, from Chinua Achebe to every famous writer of the Heinemann fame."

== Education ==
Agema's early schooling were done between Abuja and Benue state culminating in a bachelor's degree in English at the Benue State University, Makurdi and a master's in Development Studies (Geography) from the same university. Between 2018 and 2019, under the coveted Chevening scholarship administered by the British Foreign and Commonwealth Office, he earned a second master’s, this time in International Education and Development at the University of Sussex, Falmer, Brighton, United Kingdom. While there, he was the Chair, Student Reps for the School of Education and Social Works and was the founding president of African Writers [Society]. In that period, he also attended workshops and seminars including with notable figures such as Kwame Dawes and Nick Makoha. Some prominent teachers and figures who Agema has acknowledged as a core part of his learning journey and writing influences people that include Maria Ajima, Moses Tsenongu, Andrew Aba, Hyginus Ekwuazi, Mairead Dunne, Sean Higgins, his wife, Agatha, Daisy Odey, T. J. Benson, Romeo Oriogun, Carlos Ruiz Zafón, Chimamanda Ngozi Adichie, Helon Habila, Chuma Nwokolo, Sam Ogabidu, as well as his brothers, Gabriel Agema, Taver and Sever Ayede.

== Professional career ==
Books and Writing

Agema's first book, Bring our casket home: Tales one shouldn't tell was published in 2012. In 2014, he published the poetry collection, Home Equals Holes and The Bottom of Another Tale, both cover arts done by his friend and collaborator, the fantasy writer, Eugene Odogwu. In 2019, he published his children’s book, Once Upon a Village Tale which is based on imagined African folktales reminiscent of the African telling tradition. The book was shortlisted for the Association of Nigerian Authors’ Children’s Prize 2018. Agema has a work in progress short story collection, Tales of the Abroad by a Confam Africana and a poetry collection. His writings have a touch of his culture embedded in them, something he has often spoken about

Literary Administrator

Agema has been actively involved in literary administration at different levels actively since 2008 when he became the Financial Secretary of the Association of Nigerian Authors (Benue State Chapter). He rose through the ranks in the chapter and by 2014 became the Chairman. He also served in different capacities at the state and national arms of the association becoming a Council Member of the National Teen Authorship scheme, member of the national convention that held in Makurdi, Benue state under the chairmanship of Charles Iornumbe, amongst others.

In 2013, Agema founded the SEVHAGE Literary and Development Initiative, a notable registered charity that has continued to promote literature, reading and other development initiatives. In 2015, Agema curated the first SEVHAGE Festival in Makurdi that had in attendance writers such as Romeo Oriogun, T. J. Benson, Innocence Silas Sharamang, Celina Kile and Amu Nnadi.

In July 2020, Agema convened and curated the Benue Book and Arts Festival (BBAAF), a national literary convention that had in attendance several hundreds of celebrated writers, literary enthusiasts and development workers in Makurdi, Benue State, Nigeria. Guests included Servio Gbadamosi, Ahmed Maiwada, Chiedu Ezeana, Isaac Attah Ogezi, Chinua Ezenwa-Ohaeto, Bash Amuneni, T. J. Benson, Innocence Silas Sharamang, Daisy Odey, Bizuum Yadok, Amara Chimeka, Alexander Ochogwu, Sam Ogabidu, Paul Ugah, Tersser Sam Baki, Charles Iornumbe, Paul Liam, Umar Yogiza Jnr, Maik Orsterga, Mrs. Beatrice Shomkegh, David Onotu, Helen Teghtegh, Iorliam Shija, Mrs. Rosemary Hua, Felicity Jila and Mimi Werna. It was also prominently attended by the First Lady of Benue State, Dr. Eunice Ortom as well as commissioners, high political officer holders in Benue state, amongst several others.

The festival was held in collaboration with the Eunice Spring of Life Foundation, the charity of the First Lady of Benue state, Dr. Eunice Ortom whose Programmes Officer, Tine Agernor is a long-time collaborator of Agema's. Other collaborators on the project included the University of Sussex, Gender and Environmental Risk Reduction Initiative, Arojah Concept, MacArthur Foundation, and Adinya Arise Foundation, amongst others. The keynote addresses were delivered by Professor Moses Tsenongu and the literary icon, Chuma Nwokolo. The festival team included Otene Ogwuche as Festival co-director, Agema’s wife, Dr. Agatha Agema, Jennifer and Nathaniel Aduro, Andrea Vanen Kwen, Oko Owoicho, Torkwase Igbana, Luper Aluga, Anointing Biachi, Debbie Iorliam, Ephraim Chirgba, Carl Terver, and Iveren Ayede.

The 2020 edition of Benue Book and Arts Festival was held in Makurdi, Benue State in December 2020 focusing on the theme of sexual and gender-based violence and other violence. The 2021 edition focused on ‘Bridges Beyond Borders: Arts Beyond the Conventional’ and was held at the Benue State University. 2022 saw the resurgence of the festival with several a weeklong celebration with three keynote speeches from Professors Dul Johnson, Hyginus Ekwuazi and Sule Egya, global panels, drama, secondary school competitions and a spoken word slam competition which was eventually won by Hafsat Abdullahi.

Agema’s SEVHAGE in collaboration with organisations like Konya Shamsrumi, inaugurated the In Conversations series in Abuja and have so far featured celebrated writers Chuma Nwokolo and the venerated poet, Niyi Osundare.

Development Worker and Researcher

Agema was appointed Black History Month/Project Curator for the Students Union at the University of Sussex, Falmer, United Kingdom a position he held from 2019-2020. In that position, he organised "inclusive, embracive and student-oriented programmes." Some of the events included interactions with fellow Chevening/Sussex alumni and Botswana’s Minister for Trade, Bogolo Kenewendo, a documentary screening with Pravini Baboeram chaired by Professor Gurminder K. Bhambra, and a film screening of MANDELA: A LONG WALK TO FREEDOM featuring the movie’s screenwriter, award winning author, William Nicholson, amongst others.

He is currently the chief executive/lead editor at SEVHAGE Publishers, and team leader/lead researcher at SEVHAGE Literary and Development Initiative. He is an associate at the School of Education and Social Works, University of Sussex, Brighton, United Kingdom.

Agema has also worked on different projects with development and literary organisations in different capacities. He has remained a part of Sussex Writes, a body of writers/students domiciled in the University of Sussex and led by Dr. Emma Newport. In this capacity, he was part of literary outreaches to different schools within and around Brighton alongside colleagues such as Jennifer Emelife and Monica Agnes Sylvia.

== Awards ==
In addition to other literary achievements and awards, Agema has two known published poetry collections, Home Equals Holes: Tale of an Exile (Joint Winner, Association of Nigerian Authors Prize for Poetry 2014 and nominee, Wole Soyinka Prize for Literature 2018, and Bring our casket home: Tales one shouldn’t tell (Longlisted for the Association of Nigerian Authors Prize for Poetry 2012). In 2019, Agema’s children’s book, Once Upon a Village Tale was shortlisted for the Association of Nigerian Authors Children’s Literature Prize.

His short story collection, The Bottom of another Tale was shortlisted for the Association of Nigerian Authors Prize for Prose 2014 and the Abubakar Gimba Prize for Short Stories 2015. Agema was awarded the Mandela Day Short Story Prize in 2016 with his story, ‘Washing the Earth’ while his poem, ‘Tales one shouldn’t tell often’ was shortlisted for the Saraba/PEN Nigeria Poetry Prize 2013. Agema’s work in progress short story collection, Tales of the Abroad by a Confam Africana was shortlisted for the Association of Nigerian Authors/Abubakar Gimba Prize for Short Stories 2019.

Agema has been included annually in EGC's Top 50 Contemporary Poets who rocked Nigeria since 2013. Notably, he was listed on Nigerian Writers Award's 100 Most Influential Nigerian Writers Under 40 (2017 and 2018). He has also been long-listed (final 11) and was a finalist for the NLNG Nigeria Prize for literature 2022. His book, Memory and the Call of Water also won the Association of Nigerian Authors Poetry Prize 2022 while an unreleased in-progress short story collection A Maze of Fading Touches, was first runner-up for the 2022 ANA/Abubakar Gimba Prize for Short Stories.
