= Grit =

Grit, Grits, or Gritty may refer to:

== Food ==
- Grit (grain), bran, chaff, mill-dust or coarse oatmeal
- Grits, a corn-based food common in the Southern United States

== Minerals ==
- Grit, winter pavement-treatment minerals deployed in grit bins
- Grit, or gastrolith, swallowed abrasive substances with roles in digestion
- Gritstone, category of sedimentary rock
- Grit (supplement), calcium source and digestion aid in birds

== Abrasive technologies ==
- Grit, one of the byproducts of grinding, an abrasive machining process
- Grit removal, the removal of grit, the coarse abrasive material in untreated sewage
- Grit sizes, fineness/coarseness classification of sandpaper grit, and compares the CAMI and "P" designations with the average grit size in micrometres (μm)

== Art and entertainment ==
- Grit (film), a 1924 American silent film starring Clara Bow
- Grit (play), a 2023 Nigerian play by Obari Gomba
- Grit (newspaper), a magazine, formerly a weekly newspaper
- Grit (Transformers), a Micromasters Decepticon - Constructor Squad character
- Grit (TV network), an American digital multicast television network
- Grit (Martyn Bennett album), a 2003 album by Martyn Bennett
- Grit (Madrugada album), a 2002 album by Norwegian band Madrugada
- Grits (duo), a hip hop duo from the United States

== Places ==
- Grit, Texas, USA
- Grit, Virginia, USA

== Other uses ==
- Grit (given name), short for "Margaret"
- Diederik Grit (1949–2012), Dutch translator and translation scholar
- Grit (personality trait), a positive non-cognitive trait
- GRIT, the RICS (gene), a protein in humans
- Grits, a former pet of US president Jimmy Carter
- Gritty (mascot), NHL mascot of the Philadelphia Flyers since 2018
- Clear Grits, 19th-century political movement
- Liberal Party of Canada, colloquially referred to as the Grits
- GRITS or Greek Interoperable Tolling System, in the Greek motorway system

== See also ==
- Steve Gritt (born 1957), British footballer
- Franklin Gritts (1915-1996), American artist
- Nitty-gritty (disambiguation)
- True Grit (disambiguation)
