= 2024 Nigeria Prize for Literature =

Nigerian literary award given in 2024

- Date: 11 October 2024
- Location: Eko Hotels and Suites, Lagos
- Country: Nigeria

The 2024 Nigeria Prize for Literature is a literary award worth US$100,000 given for the best English-language novel published by a Nigerian author. The winner, Olubunmi Familoni for his novel The Road Does Not End, was announced on 11 October 2024 at Eko Hotels and Suites in Lagos.

Focused on children's literature, there were 163 entries during the submission space. The jury comprises Saleh Adu, the Chairman, Vicky Sylvester, Igudia Osarobu, and Chris Okemwa. On 13 July 2024, 11 books were longlisted and were announced by Akachi Adimora-Ezeigbo, the Chairman of the Advisory Board alongside Ahmed Yerima.

On 9 September 2024, the shortlist was released and it contained only three books; A Father's Pride by Ndidi Chiazor-Enenmor, The Road Does Not End by Olubunmi Familoni and Wish Maker by Uchechukwu Peter Umezurike. On 11 October 2024, Familoni was announced as the winner for his novel The Road does not End.

== Judging panel ==
- Saleh Abdu (chair)
- Vicky Sylvester
- Igudia Osarobu
- Akachi Adimora-Ezeigbo
- Olu Obafemi
- Ahmed Yerima
- Christopher Okemwa

== Nominees ==
indicates the winner
indicates shortlisted

Author	Title	Publisher
Ndidi Chiazor-Enenmo	A Father's Pride	Kays House of Publishing
Akanni Festus Olaniyi	Bode's Birthday Party	
Jumoke Verissimo	Grandma and the Moon's Hidden Secret	
Henry Akubuiro	Mighty Mite and Golden Jewel	
Temiloluwa Adeshina	Risi Recycle–The Dustbin Girl	
Olatunbosun Taofeek	The Children at the IDP Camp	
Ayo Oyeku	The Magic Jalabiya	
Olubunmi Familoni	The Road Does Not End	Noirledge Publishing
Hyginus Ekwuazi	The Third Side of a Coin	
Anietie Usen	Village Boy	
Uchechukwu Peter Umezurike	Wish Maker	

== See also ==
- List of winners and nominated authors of the Nigerian Prize for Literature
