= Jakadiya =

2017 play by Nigerian playwright Ahmed Yerima

Jakadiya is a 2017 drama by Nigerian playwright Ahmed Yerima. Published by Kraft Books Ltd, the play is set in Northern Nigeria and examines patriarchy, gender dynamics, and cultural identity within a royal caliphate.

== Plot ==
Hajiya Bilikisu, enslaved at age five, was a consort to the late emir, Sarkin Abdul Gafar, who promised to elevate her from Jakadiya (head of female slaves) to Magajiya (head of women in the kingdom). The promise remains unfulfilled for 45 years and is denied after emir’s death by Madawaki, a senior chief. Bilikisu bore the late emir a son, but the child was secretly exchanged with the queen’s stillborn child to prevent a slave-born heir. A blind soldier reveals the secret to Bilkisu. When her biological son becomes the new emir, Bilkisu sacrifices her life to perform the required mother’s blessing, without which the emir would die.

== Themes ==
The central themes include royal patriarchy, female enslavement and objectification, intra-gender conspiracy, dehumanization of subaltern groups.

== Reception and critical analysis ==
Olagoke Olorunleke Ifatimehin and Joseph Ali Dameh analyze Jakadiya as a subject caught in a "matrix of slavery" who simultaneously serves and seeks to escape a patriarchal system, engaging in intra-gender oppression while redefining her identity as a human being. Emmanuel T. Gana and Abu-Ubaida Malik analyze Jakadiya as a central conveyor of Hausa cultural codes, representing patriarchal order through verbal and non-verbal signs. Peter Omoko and Chukwuwa Anyanwu argue that the play critiques the inordinate quest for power and explores the dehumanization of subaltern groups, presenting the palace as a site of ludicrous intrigue and a reflection of broader failures in African political stability. Abidemi Olufemi Adebayo describes Hajiya Bilikisu as a victim of lifelong slavery, intra-gender conspiracy, and “dewomanization” within a rigid patriarchal system, highlighting her transformation from passive victim to an active agent using secrets about the royal lineage. Adeleke Adegboyega posits that Yerima uses the work to lament the objectification of women in royal circles, where women often aid in the dehumanization of fellow women. Shamsuddeen evaluates how the main character, Bilikisu, actively utilizes internal factional greed, bribery, and competing ambition among the court’s royal elite to negotiate for her own social elevation as a form of restitution for decades of servitude. Peter Omoko and Chukwuwa Anyanwu states that the play functions as an intentional macro-allegory for leadership failures and broader political instability across modern African states. Isonguyo Akpan observes the binary divisions of gender oppression in the play. He tracks the process of female “thingification”—the systematic reduction of female characters to functional objects within the patriarchal structure.
