= The Road Does Not End =

2024 novel by Olubunmi Familoni

- Author: Olubunmi Familoni
- Language: English
- Publisher: Noirledge Publishing
- Publication date: 2024
- Publication place: Nigeria
- ISBN: 9789786019499

The Road Does Not End is a 2024 novel by Olubunmi Familoni. It won the 2024 Nigeria Prize for Literature.

== Background ==
Olubunmi has written several plays, short fictions and essays. His short story collection, Smithereens of Death won the 2015 ANA Prize for Short Stories. In 2020, his children's book, I'll Call My Brother for You won the ANA Prize for Children's Literature. His play, When Big Masquerades Dance Naked was longlisted for the Nigeria Prize for Literature in 2023 and won the ANA Prize for Drama.

It took Olubunmi two weeks to write the novel. He cites Mark Twain's The Adventures of Huckleberry Finn and The Adventures of Tom Sawyer as inspiration.

== Reception ==
The advisory board of the Nigeria Prize for Literature praised the novel, writing that "it tells the compelling story of street life in Lagos, focusing on children who must fend for themselves" and lauds the author's narrative as highlighting the characters daily struggles and resilience, "bringing attention to the societal issues faced by vulnerable youths in Nigeria".

The novel won the Nigeria Prize for Literature after being shortlisted with Uchechukwu Peter Umezurike's Wish Maker and Ndidi Chiazor-Enenmo's A Father's Pride.
