= Yejide Kilanko =

Nigerian Canadian fiction writer and social worker

- Education: University of Ibadan; University of Victoria; University of Windsor
- Notable work: Daughters Who Walk This Path

Yejide Kilanko (born 1975) is a Nigerian Canadian fiction writer and social worker. She is known for addressing violence against women in her work. Her debut novel, Daughters Who Walk This Path, was a Canadian fiction bestseller in 2012.

== Early life and education ==
Kilanko was born in 1975 in Ibadan, Nigeria, where her father worked as a university professor. She began writing poetry at a young age. She studied political science at the University of Ibadan.

== Move to Canada and social work career ==
In 2000, Kilanko left Nigeria, and immigrated to Laurel, Maryland, in the United States. She then moved in 2004 to Canada, where she now lives in Chatham-Kent, Ontario.

In Canada, she studied social work at the University of Victoria and the University of Windsor. She works as a therapist in children's mental health.

== Writing ==
Kilanko initially focused on poetry, later turning to fiction. She was prompted to write her first novel after struggling with vicarious trauma from hearing about the experiences of the children she worked with as a mental health counselor.

Her debut book, Daughters Who Walk This Path, was published in 2012. Set in her hometown, Ibadan, it deals with sexual assault and violence against women and children in Nigeria, told through the eyes of a child narrator. It was described by reviewers as breaking boundaries on the taboo of discussing sexual violence, particularly in Nigeria.

Daughters Who Walk This Path was a Canadian national fiction bestseller for several weeks. It was featured on the Globe and Mail's list of 100 best books of 2012. In 2014, the Nigerian author Chimamanda Ngozi Adichie recommended it for summer reading in the Guardian.

Her novel was also shortlisted for the Nigeria Prize for Literature in 2016, after it was released there by a Nigerian publisher. The prize eventually went to Abubakar Adam Ibrahim for his book Season of Crimson Blossoms.

Kilanko's subsequent work of fiction, the novella Chasing Butterflies, was first published in 2015 as a fundraiser for Worldreader. It also discusses violence against women, focusing on domestic violence.

Her manuscript for her next novel, which "fictionalizes the stories of female Nigerian nurses living in the United States who were murdered by their much older husbands," was shortlisted for Canada's Guernica Prize for Literary Fiction in 2019 under the working title Moldable Women. It was published in 2021 as A Good Name.

In 2018, she published a children's book, There Is an Elephant in My Wardrobe, which is intended to help children with anxiety. Her second children's book, Juba and the Fireball, was published in 2020. Her third children's book, The Other Side of Small, was published in 2025. Her next children's book, What the Eyes See, a folk tale inspired by a Yoruba proverb, is due out in 2025.

Kilanko identifies as a feminist and describes her work as inherently feminist. She says she is particularly influenced by African and African American women writers such as Buchi Emecheta, Chika Unigwe, Toni Morrison and Alice Walker.

== Selected works ==
- Daughters Who Walk This Path (2012)
- Chasing Butterflies (2015)
- There Is an Elephant in My Wardrobe (2018)
- Juba and The Fireball (2020)
- A Good Name (2021)
- The Other Side of Small (2025)
