= Homecoming (2021 play) =

2021 play by Cheta Igbokwe

- Written by: Cheta Igbokwe

Premiere
- Date: 6 May 2021
- Place: Arts Theatre, University of Nigeria, Nsukka

Homecoming is a 2021 stage play by the Nigerian playwright Cheta Igbokwe. It premiered at Arts Theatre, University of Nigeria, Nsukka, and was published by Noirledge Publishing in December 2022. The manuscript won the 2021 ANA Prize for Drama, and the play was longlisted for the 2023 Nigeria Prize for Literature.

== Background and productions ==
Igbokwe in an interview with The Hopkins Review said that he conceived the play on 8 January 2019 at Murtala Muhammed International Airport while waiting for his sister. The paperback was published in 2022 by Noirledge Publishing.

Homecoming was first staged at the Arts Theatre in University of Nigeria, Nsukka, from 6 to 8 May 2021, directed by Ugochukwu Victor Ugwu. It was performed at the Enugu Sports Club on 7 August 2021. A new production, directed by Waheed S. Olamilekan for Orolabi Productions, was staged at the University of Ibadan on 1 and 2 December 2023.

== Reception ==
Michael Anyanwu, writing for Black Boy Review, praised the staging, music and chorus, and negatively criticised the slow scene changes negatively. Sharon Okey-Onyema, writing for Arts Lounge, described Nwakibe as a tragic hero in the Aristotelian sense and praised the staging of the shrine scenes. Emmanuel Daraloye writing in The Guardian described the Ibadan production as an economical treatment of grief, mental health and the conflict between traditional religion and Christianity. Michael Olatunbosun writing in The Eagle Online called a "well written play with lots of lessons for all categories of readers", while Sima Essien writing in The Nation called it a "magnificent work of art".

The manuscript won the 2021 ANA Prize for Drama, and was longlisted for the 2023 Nigeria Prize for Literature.
