= Aetu =

2008 drama by Ahmed Yerima

Aetu is a 2007 drama by Nigerian playwright Ahmed Yerima, published by Kraft Books Ltd.

The play is set in South-West Nigeria and addresses Yoruba cultural practices, including child marriage, rape, and wife inheritance.

== Plot ==
The protagonist, Aetu, is a 14-year-old girl engaged to Atiba, whom she loves. However, her father forces her to marry Oke, an influential man, because Atiba is poor. Oke kills Atiba, rapes Aetu, and impregnates her. With the help of Saura, a priest of the deity Èṣù, Aetu places a generational curse on Oke and his household: no man will die of old age. After Oke's death, Aetu is inherited by his kinsmen as property. Two subsequent husbands mysteriously die, each after Aetu bears them a son. Following the birth of her third child, Aetu dies by suicide.

== Themes ==
The central themes of the play include the trauma of the child marriage, rape, wife inheritance, the dehumanization and objectification of women under patriarchy, and the use of curses as a form of female agency and vengeance.

== Reception and critical analysis ==
Awoyemi Taiye examines child marriage in Aetu, noting that the practice of betrothing female infants to older men is an age-long custom in various parts of Nigeria.

Taiwo Oloruntoba-Oju analyzes the play's representation of time through Western feminist theory and the Yoruba mythological belief in akudayaism—the transmigration of spirits of the dead who cannot find rest among ancestors. Nkiruka Jacinta Akaenyi argues that the protagonist finds agency against her abusers through the use of extreme curses, despite resulting psychological trauma. Ade Adeniji, Ige Nafiu, and Oyetunji Sunday categorize Aetu as a feminist story that explores the struggles of a woman oppressed by patriarchy and serves as an "exegesis" on how wife inheritance and girl-child marriage fix women in subordinate social positions.

Taiwo Osanyemi argues that the play functions as a "historical satire" that uses the "patterns of dream" to expose the "neurosis of tradition" and the oppression of women in Nigerian society. Adeleke Adegboyega notes that Aetu evolves into a strong-willed figure who asserts her identity by laying a generational curse as an act of vengeance for dehumanization and objectification. Rantimi Jays Julius-Adeoye observes Aetu as a marker of the author’s transition from broad historical epics to domestic, gender-focused narratives. It details the plot mechanics where a female character is legally transferred as property among family kinsmen. Eunice Kalu describes how female characters attempt to build self-confidence and execute decisions when facing institutionalized internal oppression. Atteh Yinka observes how historical and social structures influence the evolution of gender roles in traditional African environments. It analyses the specific ways male characters make decisions based on personal desire and maps how the female protagonist respond to traditional structural constraints.
