= The Sweetest Remedy =

2021 novel by Jane Igharo

- Author: Jane Igharo
- Language: English
- Genre: Fiction
- Publication date: September 28, 2021
- ISBN: 978-0-593-10196-4

The Sweetest Remedy is a romance novel by Jane Igharo. She is a Nigerian fiction writer best known for her debut novel Ties That Tether. The novel centers around Hannah Bailey, a woman seeking connection to her heritage who travels to Nigeria for her estranged father's funeral.

== Synopsis ==
Hannah Bailey spent most of her life without her knowing Nigerian father, a man who briefly had an affair with her white mother. When her father dies, she decides to search for answers about her father by accepting the invitation to his funeral in Nigeria. She meets her family, who have mixed response on here. As the day of the funeral leads up, she discovers more about her heritage, culture and sees herself in a new light as a man comes to take her heart.
