= Agada (name) =

Nigerian given name

- Gender: Male
- Language: Idoma

Origin
- Origin: Idoma
- Meaning: "Braveness" or "Strength"
- Region of origin: North Central Nigeria

Agada is a Nigerian surname predominantly found in North Central Nigeria among the Idoma and Igala people. It means "Braveness" or "Strength".

== Notable people with the surname ==
- William Agada (born 1999), Nigerian professional footballer
- Jerry Agada (1952–2020), Nigerian educationist
- Caleb Agada, Nigerian-Canadian professional basketball player
