= Akuabata =

2008 drama by Ahmed Yerima

- Author: Ahmed Yerima
- Publisher: KRAFTGRIOTS (A literary imprint of Kraft Books Limited)
- Publication date: 2008
- ISBN: 978-978-48457-4-8

Akuabata is a 2008 drama by Nigerian playwright Ahmed Yerima. Published by Kraft Books Ltd, the play is set in South-Eastern Nigeria and explores Igbo cultural tradition, gender fluidity, and the archetype of the scapegoat.

== Plot ==
Olanma is betrothed at age twelve to Iyieke, a god of the Amaigbo people and the Anyadoro family. She later marries Isiugwu, a prince, and performs traditionally male duties such as farming and managing property inheritance. When the family neglects Iyieke's worship, the god attacks Olanma and demands her returns as his wife. Olanma resists and converts to Christianity. Her daughter, Obiageli, ultimately sacrifices herself to Iyieke to prevent the family's destruction.

== Themes ==
The central themes include the clash between traditional religious bondage and individual agency, the scapegoat archetype, gender fluidity as either empowerment or subjugation, and the sacrificial role of women in maintaining family and communal stability.

== Reception and critical analysis ==
Adeleke Adegboyega describes how Olanma and her daughter Obiageli are treated as "sacrificial lambs" for the community, noting that Olanma is portrayed as a matriarchal figure who enjoys privileges usually reserved for men, such as inheriting property and leading prayers. Oyinyechi Anyalenkeya argues that the gender fluidity in Akuabata is a tool for subjugation and serial abuse of Olanma, making her a scapegoat; she contends that being called Akuabata (Igbo for 'our wealth has come') and given male privileges are not true honors but a "huge burden," rendering Olanma a "woman ungendered." Saeedat Aliyu explores the gender fluidity in the play, noting that Olanma inherits property, sits in men's meetings, and farms "like a hungry lioness" while her husband cooks and cleans. Adeolu Babatunde Adeniji investigates Yerima's cultural dramaturgy, observing that his works are "culture-based dramatic text" that project the cultural values of Nigeria's three major ethnic groups. Stephen Ogheneruro Okpadah frames Akuabata as a specific illustration of Yerima pitching his thematic stance in support of indigenous traditions. He also notes that the play depicts a tragic clash between public responsibility and personal love triggered by an ignored spiritual deity, serving as an authorial argument for liberation from exocolonial influences. Julius-Adeoye focuses on the specific dramatic conflict where a female protagonist attempts to reject an indigenous god via conversion to Catholicism. The study traces how this structural shift fails to protect her lineage when the spurned deity seeks retribution.
