= Agema (surname) =

Agema is a surname. Notable people with the surname include:

- David Agema (born 1949), American politician
- Fleur Agema (born 1976), Dutch politician and former spatial designer
- Sueddie Agema, Nigerian poet, editor, and literary administrator
