= Grit (given name) =

Grit is a given name, derived as a short for "Margaret". Notable people with the name include:

- Grit Boettcher (born 1938), German actress
- Grit Breuer (born 1972), German athlete
- Grit Haid (1900–1938), Austrian stage and film actress
- Grit Hammer (born 1966), German shot putter
- Grit Hegesa (1891–1972), German dancer and silent film actress
- Grit Jurack (born 1977), German handball player
- Grit Lehmann (born 1976), volleyball player
- Grit Müller (born 1972), German swimmer
- Grit Naumann (born 1966), German volleyball player
- Grit Šadeiko (born 1989), Estonian heptathlete
- Grit Slaby (born 1965), German swimmer
