= Ezenwa-Ohaeto =

Nigerian poet

- Born: 1958
- Died: 2005 (aged 46–47)
- Citizenship: Nigerian
- Occupation(s): Poet, short story writer and academic
- Years active: 1980-2005

Ezenwa-Ohaeto (1958–2005) was a Nigerian poet, short story writer and academic. He was one of the first Nigerians to publish poems written in Pidgin English. He died in Cambridge in 2005.

== Life and career ==
Ezenwa-Ohaeto was born on 31 March 1958 to Michael Ogbonnaya Ohaeto and Rebecca Ohaeto in Ife Ezinihite in Mbaise local government area of Imo State. He began his primary education at St. Augustine Grammar School, Nkwerre in 1971. He completed his secondary education in 1975 with distinction in arts and sciences with a Grade One certificate. He studied at the University of Nigeria under the tutelage of novelist Chinua Achebe and critic Donatus Nwoga from 1971 to 1979. He subsequently graduated with a Bachelor of Arts with honours in English. He earned a Masters of Arts from UNN with a scholarship from the Imo state government in 1982. In 1991, he was awarded a PhD in literature from University of Benin.

Ezenwa-Ohaeto began his teaching career in 1980 as an assistant lecturer at Ahmadu Bello University. From 1982 to 1992 he taught at Anambra State College of Education, Awka as a lecturer. He then taught at Alvan Ikoku Federal College of Education as an assistant professor from 1992 to 1998 and as a senior lecturer at Nnamdi Azikiwe University from 1998 until his death in 2005. Ezenwa-Ohaeto was married to Ngozi with who he had four children.

He was the father of Chinua Ezenwa-Ohaeto.

== Awards and recognitions ==
- Association of Nigerian Authors/Cadbury Poetry Award
- Fellow, African Studies Centre, University of Cambridge
- Nigeria Prize for Literature

== Bibliography ==
- Chants of a Minstrel
- I Wan Bi President
- Songs of a Traveller
- Chinua Achebe: A Biography
- The Voice of the Night Masquerade
- "If to Say I bi Soja"
- "Winging Words"
