= Labo Yari =

Nigerian writer (1942–2023)

- Born: 14 April 1942 Katsina, British Nigeria
- Died: 18 March 2023 (aged 80) Katsina, Nigeria
- Language: English
- Genre: Novels and short stories
- Years active: 1978–2007
- Notable awards: Lifetime Achievement Award
- Children: Two sons and four daughters

Alhaji Labo Yari (14 April 1942 – 18 March 2023) was a Nigerian writer and founding member of the Association of Nigerian Authors. He wrote Climate of Corruption in 1978, the first English language novel published throughout Northern Nigeria.

== Life and career ==
Born in Katsina, Yari studied at the London School of Journalism, and between 1966 and 1967 Norwegian literature at the University of Oslo. He started his journalistic career in 1962, and later worked for the Federal Ministry of Information and Culture and as general manager of the publishing house Gaskiya Corporation. In 1978, he debuted as a novelist with Climate of Corruption, the first English language novel published in Northern Nigeria, which was a commercial hit. In 1982 he was among the five co-founders of the Association of Nigerian Authors (ANA). He died at the Federal Teaching Hospital in Katsina on 18 March 2023, at the age of 80. At the time of his death he had just finished a new novel, Awaiting Gozo.

== Works ==
- Climate of Corruption (1978), Fourth Dimension Publishing Company, Nigeria. ISBN 978-156-014-2.
- A House in the Dark (1985), Fourth Dimension Publishing Company, Nigeria. ISBN 978-156-148-3.
- Man of the Moment (1992), Fourth Dimension Publishing Company, Nigeria. ISBN 978-156-289-7.
- A day without cockcrow and other stories (1999), Informart Publishers, Nigeria. ISBN 978-34855-5-5.
- Muhamman Dikko, Emir of Katsina and his times: 1865–1944 (2007), Summit Books, Nigeria. ISBN 978-194-464-1.
