= Olubunmi Familoni =

Nigerian writer

Olubunmi Familoni is a Nigerian author and playwright. He is the 2024 recipient of the Nigeria Prize for Literature. His book, The Road Does Not End won him the award. He also won the Association of Nigerian Authors (ANA) prize for short stories in 2015, and for children's literature in 2020.

== Writing career ==
Familoni is an author and playwright, who focuses on plays, short fiction and essays. He won the Association of Nigerian Authors (ANA) prize for short stories in 2015 for his collection of stories, Smithereens of Death. In 2020, he also won the Association of Nigerian Authors (ANA) Prize for Children's Literature for his book I'll Call My Brother for You. In 2023, the manuscript for his novel The Becoming-Nothing of Bodies was longlisted for the Island Prize. That same year, he won the ANA Prize for Drama for his book When Big Masquerades Dance Naked, which was also nominated for the Nigeria Prize for Literature, but lost to the eventual winner, Obari Gomba.

In 2024, his book, The Road Does Not End, won the Nigeria Prize for Literature.

== Bibliography ==
- Smithereens of Death
- I'll Call My Brother for You
- The Becoming-Nothing of Bodies
- When Big Masquerades Dance Naked
- The Road Does Not End
