= True Grit =

True Grit may refer to:

== Fiction ==
- True Grit (novel), a 1968 novel by Charles Portis
  - True Grit (1969 film), a film adaptation by Henry Hathaway, starring John Wayne
  - True Grit (2010 film), a film adaptation by the Coen Brothers, starring Jeff Bridges

== Music ==
- True Grit (1969 soundtrack), by Glen Campbell and Elmer Bernstein
  - "True Grit" (song), the album's title track
- True Grit (2010 soundtrack), by Carter Burwell
- True Grit (Bret Michaels album), 2015
- "True Grit", a song by the Crystal Method from Legion of Boom, 2004

== Other uses ==
- True Grit (mascot), at University of Maryland, Baltimore County, US
- Starrcade '88: True Gritt, a pay-per-view professional wrestling event held on December 26, 1988

== See also ==
- True Grit: A Further Adventure, a 1978 made-for-TV sequel
- Grit (disambiguation)
