= Lola Akande =

Nigerian academic and author (b. 1965)

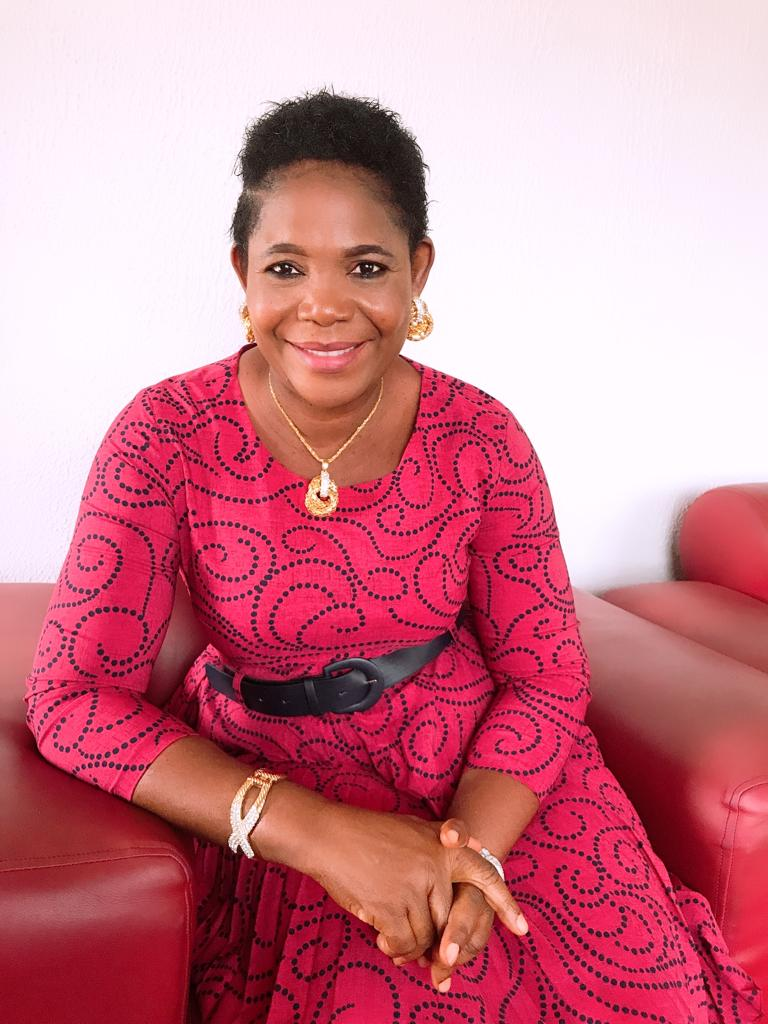
- Born: Lola Akande; 3 October 1965 (age 60); Oke-Ode, Ifelodun, Kwara, Nigeria)
- Education: Kwara State College of Technology (now Kwara State Polytechnic); University of Ilorin; University of Ibadan; University of Lagos
- Occupations: Faculty at the University of Lagos; Author; Public relations professional
- Writing career
- Period: 1986–present
- Genres: novel; fiction
- Subjects: Literatures of the city; feminist activism; cultural studies; postcolonial studies; literary theory
- Notable works: What It Takes, The Truth about Sadia
- Notable awards: Association Of Nigerian Authors Prize for Prose Fiction; 2017; Association Of Nigerian Authors Prize for Short Story 2022

Lola Akande (born 3 October 1965) is a Nigerian academic and fiction writer. She has published three novels and a collection of short stories including the award winning _What It Takes_ and her latest novel, __The Truth about Sadia_ which is endorsed by the National Drug Law Enforcement Agency (NDLEA)

== Life and career ==
Akande was born on 3 October 1965 in Kwara state, Nigeria. She teaches African literature in the Department of English, Faculty of Arts, University of Lagos. Her first novel, In Our Place, was published in 2012 by Macmillan Nigeria Publishers Limited, which was subsequently followed by What It Takes, which was published in 2016. In 2020, she published a collection of short stories which won the ANA award for Short Story, in 2022.

== Published works ==
Lola Akande has published four works of fiction, a monograph and several academic publications.

=== Novels ===
- Akande, Lola. 2023. The Truth about Sadia. Lagos: Tunmike Pages.
- Akande, Lola . 2020. Suitors Are Scarce in Lagos. Lagos: Tunmike Pages.
- Akande, Lola. 2018. Where Are You From? Ibadan: Kraft Books Limited.
- Akande, Lola. 2016. What It Takes Ibadan: Kraft Books Limited.
- Akande, Lola. 2012. In Our Place Ibadan: Macmillan Nigeria Publishers Limited

=== Short stories ===
- Akande, Lola. 2019 "I Fixed It" published in the anthology: Sisi Eko. Lagos: Farafina
- Akande, Lola. 2013 "Camouflage" published in the anthology: Dream Chasers. Ibadan: Nelson Fiction

=== Monograph ===
Akande, Lola. (2019) The City in the African Novel - A Thematic Rendering of Urban Spaces. Lagos: Tunmike Pages

== Awards ==
Her work, What It Takes in 2017 earned her the Association of Nigerian Authors (ANA) Prize for Prose Fiction.

Her collection of Short Stories, Suitors Are Scarce in Lagos won the Association of Nigerian Authors (ANA) Prize for Short Story 2022.
