= The Last of the Strong Ones =

1996 novel by Akachi Ezeigbo

- Author: Akachi Adimora- Ezieigbo
- Genre: Literary Fiction
- Published: 1996
- Publisher: Vista books
- ISBN: 9781341181

The Last of the Strong Ones is feminist novel by Akachi Ezeigbo published in 1996. The first novel in her Umuga trilogy.
