= Henry Akubuiro =

Nigerian journalist

Henry Akubuiro // is a Nigerian literary journalist, novelist and short story writer.

== Early life and career ==
Akubuiro graduated from the Department of English and Literary Studies, Imo State University, Owerri in 2003. He began his journalism career as an undergraduate at the university, where he became the pioneer editor of The Elite—the student newspaper in Imo State University—and The Imo Star—the newspaper of the Student Union Government. He won the 1998 BBC World Service Young Reporters' Competition and the National Essay Competition organised by the Federal Ministry of Youth and Sports.

In 2005, he won the ANA Literary Journalist of the Year; while his unpublished juvenilia, Little Wizard of Okokomaiko, won the 2009 ANA/Lantern Prize for Fiction.

In 2016, he wrote Prodigals in Paradise, which was shortlisted for the 2016 ANA Prose Prize.

Akubuiro's children book, Mighty Mite and Golden Jewel was longlisted for the 2024 Nigeria Prize for Literature.
