= Cheta Igbokwe =

Nigerian playwright

Cheta Igbokwe (born Sixtus Chetachi Igbokwe; 1996) is a Nigerian playwright, poet, and author. His play Homecoming won the 2021 Association of Nigerian Authors' (ANA) Prize for Drama and was nominated for the 2023 Nigeria Prize for Literature.

== Early life and education ==
Cheta Igbokwe was born in 1996 in Owerri, Nigeria. In 2021, Igbokwe graduated with a Bachelor of Arts in English and Literary Studies from the University of Nigeria, Nsukka (UNN). As a student of UNN, Igbokwe served as the editor of The Muse, a journal established by Chinua Achebe in 1963. In 2022, Igbokwe earned a full scholarship to pursue a Master of Fine Arts degree in Playwriting at the University of Iowa, where he is a graduate student and teaches two playwriting courses.

== Writing ==
Agwaetiti Obiuto (Island of Happiness), a screenplay written by Igbokwe was nominated for the Africa Movie Academy Awards for Best First Feature Film by a Director and the Ousmane Sembene Award for Best Film in an African Language in 2018 and was praised as a "magnificent work of art" by Wole Soyinka.

Igbokwe is a 2019 alumnus of The Purple Hibiscus Trust Creative Writing Workshop organised by Chimamanda Ngozi Adichie.

Igbokwe's play Homecoming won the Association of Nigerian Authors (ANA) Prize in 2021 and was longlisted for the 2023 Nigeria Prize for Literature where the judges described it as "philosophical and gravely entertaining".
