= The Son of the House =

2019 novel by Cheluchi Onyemelukwe

- First edition (Nigeria)
- Author: Cheluchi Onyemelukwe-Onubia
- Language: English
- Genre: Literary fiction, family saga
- Publisher: Penguin Random House LLC; Parrésia Publishers
- Publication date: 2019
- Publication place: Nigeria
- Media type: Print (paperback)
- Pages: 304
- ISBN: 978-1-4597-4708-1

The Son of the House is a family saga novel written by the Nigerian author Cheluchi Onyemelukwe. Her debut novel, it was first published by Parrésia Publishers (in Nigeria) and Penguin Random House South Africa in 2019.

== Plot ==
The Son of the House is focused mainly on Nwabulu, who was sent out by her step mother to work as a servant. She falls in love with a boy from a wealthy family who impregnates her and then denies the pregnancy. Nwabulu is sent back to the village where she was married to a man whose grandmother is eager to get a grandson.

Meanwhile, there is also an independent teacher named Julie who has fallen in love with a wealthy man married man named Eugene who wants nothing more than a son.

When both women are kidnapped, they tell each other their stories and find that they have more in common than they once thought.

== Theme ==
The novel revolves around polygamy, patriarchy in Africa, and the subordinate position in which most women are kept in Africa.

== Reception ==
A reviewer at Publishers Weekly described the novel as an "intimate study of the issues facing contemporary Nigeria" and said that the author's "masterly storytelling makes this consistently entertaining". Quill and Quire described it as a "roller coaster of emotions that Nwabulu experiences with perfectly executed cliffhangers to her chapters". CBC Books acknowledged that the "...debut is set against four decades of vibrant Nigeria, celebrating the resilience of women as they navigate and transform what still remains a man's world." The novel has been compared to Buchi Emecheta's The Joys of Motherhood (1979).

== Awards and recognition ==
Year	Award	Result	Ref
2019	Sharjah International Book Fair	Won	
2020	SprinNG Women Authors Prize	Won	
2021	Giller Prize	Shortlisted	
2021	Nigeria Prize for Literature	Won	
2021	Chinua Achebe Prize for Literature	Shortlisted	

=== Other honours ===
- 35 Canadian books to check out in summer 2021 by CBC Radio.
- The Top Nigerian Books Of 2019 by Channels Television.
