= Chuma Nwokolo =

Nigerian lawyer, writer and publisher (born 1963)

- Born: 1963 (age 62–63); Jos, Nigeria
- Education: University of Nigeria
- Occupation: Lawyer Writer Publisher
- Website: https://nwokolo.com/y/

Chuma Nwokolo (born 1963) is a Nigerian lawyer, writer and publisher.

== Early life and education ==
Chuma Nwokolo was born in Jos, Nigeria, in 1963. He graduated from the University of Nigeria in 1983 and was called to the bar of the Supreme Court of Nigeria in 1984.

== Career ==
He worked for the Legal Aid Council and was managing partner of the C&G Chambers, practising mainly in Lagos Nigeria. He was also writer-in-residence at the Ashmolean Museum in Oxford, England. He is publisher of the literary magazine African Writing, which he founded with Afem Akem.

Nwokolo's first novels, The Extortionist (1983) and Dangerous Inheritance (1988), were published by Macmillan in the Pacesetter Novels. His other books include African Tales at Jailpoint (1999), Diaries of a Dead African (2003) One More Tale for the Road (2003), Memories of Stone (poetry, 2006), The Ghost of Sani Abacha (2012), How to Spell Naija in 100 Short Stories (2013), The Final Testament of a Minor God (poetry, 2014), His novel The Extinction of Menai is due in 2015. His short stories and poetry have been published in the London Review of Books, La Internazionale, AGNI, MTLS, Arzenal, and Sentinel, among other places. Nwokolo is a highly itinerant writer and travels extensively across the African continent to deliver lectures on African writing and culture.

He is a member of the Nigerian Bar Association, the Nigerian Institute of International Affairs, the Association of Nigerian Authors (ANA), and PEN.

Nwokolo is a founder of the BribeCode, a nationwide campaign to eradicate corporate corruption by adopting the bill the Corporate Corruption Act, which he devised and presented to the National Assembly in 2015.
