= Jerry Agada =

Nigerian educationist and author (1952–2020)

Jerry Anthony Agada
- Born: 11 November 1952; Orokam, Benue State
- Died: 22 December 2020 (aged 68)
- Education: St. Francis Secondary School, Otukpo; Kaduna Polytechnic; University of Exeter; University of Strathclyde, Glasgow
- Known for: Education
- Awards: NNOM

Professor Jerry Agada (born Jerry Anthony Agada //, 11 November 1952 – 22 December 2020) was a Nigerian educationist, scholar, author, chairman of Benue State Civil Service Commission, former president of the Association of Nigerian Authors (ANA), the first Fellow of the Association of Nigerian Authors in Central Nigeria, the vice-chairman of Fidei Polytechnic, Gboko and former minister of state for Education of the Federal republic of Nigeria. He is known for writings with the publication of his first book, The Magic year – poetry in prose and rhymes, in 1996 and followed that book with another in 1998, The Secret Deal, a collection of stories, Rage and Tears, Orokam: A Roadmap for Socio-Economic & Political Advancement, Holy Land: Encounters and Symbolism and Web of Convictions. He won the accolade of Academic Person of the year 2016 from Idoma Governor Support Group and the best author by Association of Nigerian Authors.

== Early life and education ==
Born on 11 November 1952 at Orokam in Ogbadibo Local Government Area of Benue State, Jerry Agada started his educational journey at Joseph's Primary School, Orokam, Benue State, from 1959 to 1965, and to St. Francis Secondary School, Otukpo Benue State, between 1966 and 1970. He proceeded to Kaduna Polytechnic, C.A.B.S Kaduna State in 1971 and after graduating from there in 1973 he attended the National Technical Teachers College, Yaba, Lagos State, between 1973 and 1974 for the Technical Teacher's Certificate in Commerce. Between 1979 and 1981, he was also at the University of Exeter (MARJONS), Plymouth, United Kingdom, where he obtained a Bachelor of Education degree (English). He also earned a Master of Commerce in Marketing from the University of Strathclyde, Glasgow, Scotland, in 1984 and a Doctor of Philosophy in Public Sector Management from the Post Graduate School, Staton University, Tampa, Florida, United States, in 2003. He was also at the University of Birmingham, School of Public Policy in October 2003 for the Certificate in Management Contracting & Partnership for Service Delivery.

== Career ==
He started his career in 1974 as classroom teacher in charge of Business Education subjects in Government College, Keffi. He was there until 1977, when he relocated to Government College, Makurdi, in 1977 following the creation of Benue State. He served as Commissionaire with the Nigerian High Commission, London between 1982 and 1983. Upon his return to Nigeria, he was posted to Army Day Secondary School, Abakpa, Enugu, for the National Youth Service Corps. He returned to Government College, Makurdi, in 1985 as Head, Business Studies. By 1987, he had become Vice Principal (Administration) of the college. He also acted as the Principal of the college between 1987 and 1988, when he was formally appointed Principal of the college. He was in that position until 1992, when he was elevated to the position of Guidance Counselor and Principal Special Grade at the Headquarters of the Benue State Teaching Service Board. He was transferred to Government College, Utonkon in 1993 as Principal Special Grade. He held that position until 1996 when he was appointed the Executive Secretary, Benue State Examinations Board.

By 1999, Agada was again elevated to the position of Permanent Secretary, Benue State Ministry of Information, Youth, Sports and Culture. He also served in the same capacity in the Ministry of Education, Benue State Ministry of Local Government and Chieftaincy Affairs and the Benue State Bureau of Political Affairs. Upon his retirement from the Civil Service of Benue State, he joined the Peoples Democratic Party (PDP) and sought election to the office of the Governor of Benue State. He lost the bid; however, he later emerged as the Minister of State for Education, Federal Republic of Nigeria, in July 2007. He left the Ministerial position in October 2008 but by March 2009, he was appointed as the chairman, Governing Board of the National Commission for Colleges of Education (NCCE), Abuja.

In 2013, the European American University, Commonwealth of Dominica now an affiliate of the Western Orthodox University, appointed him as a Visiting Professor in Education. He was also chairman of the Advisory Board, Presidential Schools Debate, Nigeria, from 2013, Vice-chairman, Advisory Board of the Nigeria Prize for Literature of the Nigeria LNG (NLNG) since 2009. and chairman, Governing Council, Eastern Polytechnic, Port Harcourt since August 2015. In 2016, he was appointed Member Governing Council, Fidei Polytechnic Gboko, Benue State. In November 2016, he was appointed Chairman of the Benue State Civil Service Commission.

Agada was a Fellow of the British Society of Commerce, Member, Institute of Marketing and Member, Nigeria Association of Business Educators, Member, Nigeria Association of Educational Administration and Planning. He was also a Fellow of the Association of Nigerian Authors, a member of the Nigeria Institute of Management and of the Institute of Industrialist and Corporate Administration. In February 2012, he was selected as one of fifty men of integrity in Nigeria by the editorial board of the Guardian Newspaper of Nigeria. On 17 August 2017, he was honoured with the title of Africa's Patriotic Personality of the Year by the African Students Union Parliament, (ASUP).

Agada held several other positions in government and associations. He was the Chairman of the Benue State Petroleum Monitoring Committee between 1999 and 2000 and Member of the Benue State Reform Team between 2001 and 2006. He was also the Secretary General, National Orokam-Aroji Summit from 1992 to 1999 and chairman of the boardof Zion Micro-Finance Bank, Makurdi between 2006 and 2008. He was a former National President of the Association of Nigerian Authors (ANA) and patron of its branch in Benue State. In November 2015, his Orokam Community in Ogbadibo LGA, honoured him with the Chieftaincy title of the Oyalobu 1 of Orokam – meaning "The Pacesetter" within the Community. He was conferred with the title of "Omachi Onu Egume of Egume by the Igala Area Traditional council in 2008.

== Selected books ==
- The Secret Deal and Other Stories (1998)
- Rage and Tears (2002)
- The Soothsayer (2003)
- The Secret Deal (2003)
- The Honourable Chairman (2003)
- The Magic Year: (a Poetry in Prose and Rhymes)
- The Successors (2007)

== Death ==
Agada died on 22 December 2020, after a brief illness.
