= Grit Lehmann =

German volleyball player

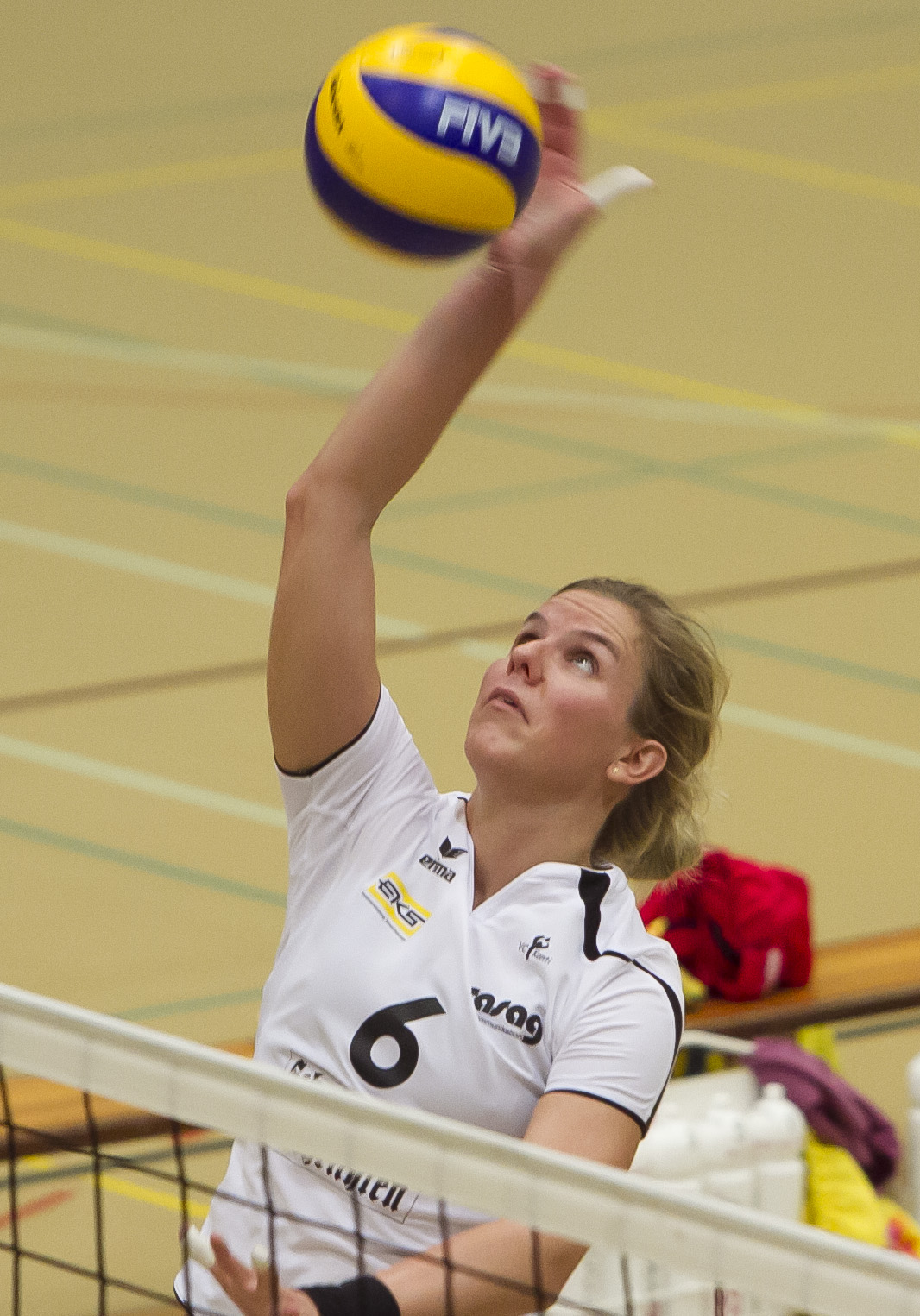

Personal information
- Full name: Grit Lehmann
- Nationality: German
- Born: 1 August 1976 (age 50); Berlin, Germany

Grit Lehmann (born 1 August 1976) is a German former professional volleyball player. In March 2013, she announced her retirement after playing her last game for Swiss club VC Kanti Schaffhausen against Volero Zürich in the Swiss Championships play-off finals.

== Facts ==
- Position: Universal (outside hitter - middleblock - Opposite)
- Length: 5 ft 98
- Nickname: Gretl, Griti, Grizzly

== Teams ==
- TZ Treptow (Germany)
- CJD Berlin (Germany)
- VC Olympia Berlin (Germany)
- Marzahner SV (Germany)
- Volley Cats Berlin (Germany)
- Fortis Herentals (Belgien)
- Asterix Kieldrecht (Belgien)
- Tamera Lummen (Belgien)
- Euphony Tongeren (Belgien)
- VfB 91 Suhl (Germany)
- VC Kanti Schaffhausen (Switzerland)

== Bio ==
- 1994 German champion A-youth
- 1994 European championship in Hungary (youth): 3rd place
- 1995 world championship in Thailand (youth): 8th place
- 2001 winner Belgian supercup
- 2007 Belgian champion
- 2008 Winner German cup
- 2010 German cup, runner up
- 2013 Swiss vice Champion
