= Chinua Ezenwa-Ohaeto =

Nigerian poet and academic

- Born: Chinụalumugo Ezenwa-Ọhaeto; Awka, Anambra
- Education: Nnamdi Azikiwe University (BA, MA); University of Nebraska–Lincoln (PhD)
- Occupations: poet; essayist; academic
- Years active: 2009–present
- Notable work: The Teenager Who Became My Mother (2020) The Naming (2025)
- Father: Ezenwa-Ohaeto

Chinụa Ezenwa-Ọhaeto is a Nigerian poet and academic. He is the author of The Teenager Who Became My Mother, published in 2020. His full-length poetry collection, The Naming, was published by APBF via the University of Nebraska Press, 2025.

== Early life and education ==
Chinua Ezenwa-Ohaeto was born in Awka, Anambra State, where his father Ezenwa-Ohaeto taught at Nnamdi Azikiwe University. He grew up between Germany and Nigeria due to his father's profession. He was named after Chinua Achebe, who was his father's mentor. While growing up, Ezenwa-Ohaeto envisioned becoming an inventor but changed his mind when he started reading his father's poems. He earned his bachelor's and master's degrees in English Language and Literature at the Nnamdi Azikiwe University. He is currently a PhD student for Creative Writing at the University of Nebraska–Lincoln.

== Career ==
Chinua is a poet, short story writer and essayist. Some of his essays can be found on Google Scholar. In 2009, Chinua won the ANA/Mazariyya Teen Poetry Prize as a freshman at Nnamdi Azikiwe University, Awka. He was a runner-up in 2014 for the Etisalat Prize for Literature, flash fiction category. In 2020, he published a chapbook, The Teenager Who Became My Mother, via Sevhage Publishers. In 2018, he won the Castello di Duino Poesia Prize for an unpublished poem and was the recipient of the New Hampshire Institute of Art's 2018 Writing Award, as well as the recipient of a scholarship to the institute's MFA program, though he could not attend due to financial constraints. In 2019, he was the winner of the Sevhage/Angus Poetry Prize and second runner-up in the fifth Singapore Poetry Contest.

According to Afrocritik’s Anticipated Books of 2025, "Chinua Ezenwa-Ohaeto’s debut book of poetry, The Naming, conflates family history, Igbo ontology and the legends of origin and belonging in order to trace and name a lineage full of greatness and esoteric knowledge. Grandly conceived and thematically cohesive, this is poetry of great oral power."

His works have appeared in Isele Magazine, The Republic, Poetry Ireland Review, Oxford Poetry, Massachusetts Review, Frontier, Palette, The Common, Southword Magazine, Colorado Review, Mud Season Review, Notra Dame, Anmly, The Republic, Up the Staircase Quarterly, Ruminate and elsewhere.

== Bibliography ==
Chapbooks

- The Teenager Who Became My Mother

Full-Length

- The Naming
