= Season of Crimson Blossoms =

2015 novel by Abubakar Ibrahim

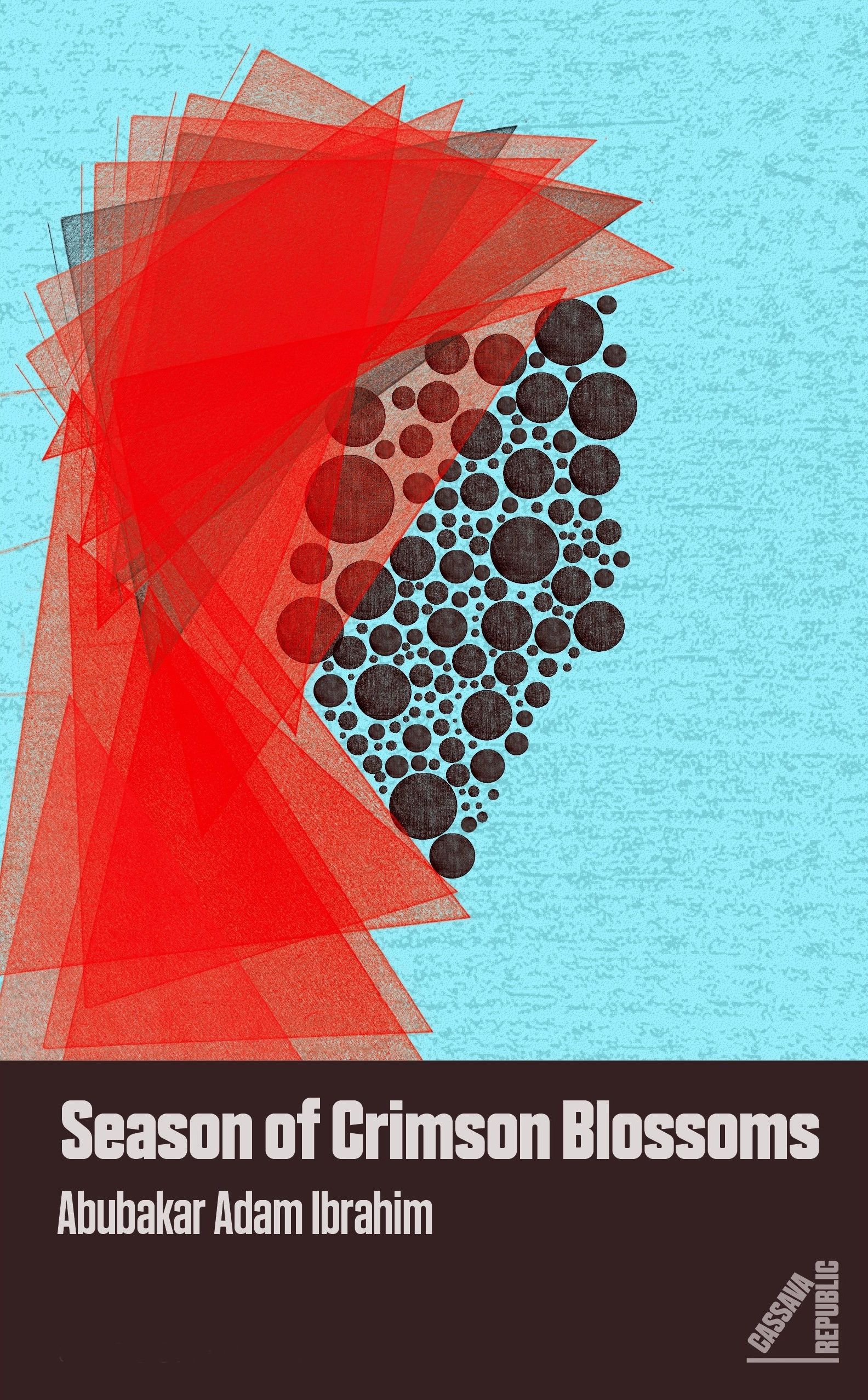
- Cover image
- Author: Abubakar Adam Ibrahim
- Language: English
- Genre: Romantic fantasy, adult fiction, family saga, literary fiction
- Set in: Jos, Nigeria
- Publisher: Parrésia Publishers, Nigeria (2015); Cassava Republic Press, United Kingdom (2016)
- Publication date: 2015
- Publication place: Nigeria
- Media type: Print (Paperback)
- Pages: 346
- Awards: Nigeria Prize for Literature (2016)
- ISBN: 9781911115007
- Preceded by: Painted Love in Valentine's Day Anthology

Season of Crimson Blossoms is an adult fiction debut novel by Nigerian writer and journalist Abubakar Adam Ibrahim. The novel, set largely in the outskirts of Abuja, Nigeria, depicts an unusual salacious affair between the 55-year old widow Hajiya Binta and the 26-year old drug dealer and local gang leader Reza.

It was first published in Nigeria in 2015 by Parrésia Publishers. Later Cassava Republic acquired the rights for international publication and released it in Germany, Kenya, South Africa, and the United Kingdom. It was released in the United States in 2017. The book won the 2016 Nigeria Prize for Literature, generally considered the biggest literary award in Africa, for best prose fiction. It is one of the few internationally released Nigerian fiction novels that features Nigerian Hausa people and the Hausa language.

== Synopsis ==
The story is set in predominantly Northern Nigeria against the backdrop of violence in the author's home city of Jos, Plateau State. The plot also spills into other parts of northern Nigeria, including the capital, Abuja; the story takes place roughly between 2009 and 2015. The story focuses on Binta Zubairu, a Muslim widow in her mid-50s who falls for Reza, a local political thug and drug lord in his early 20s. Binta, a survivor of violence that tore her family apart in her former home in Jos, sees in Reza not her murdered husband but her slain son Yaro. In turn, Reza, with an ailing father and a mother he last saw as a child, feels the undertow of parental warmth in his budding liaison with Binta. When they meet again and have sex, the dynamic feels incestuous to them, as Binta reminds Reza of his mother who abandoned him and he reminds her of her slain son, whom she could not address by his given name due to social norms.

=== Characters ===
- Hajiya Binta (Binta Zubairu) is the lead protagonist and a 55-year-old Muslim widow. She is known by the local community for her adherence to the Islamic faith. She lives in the suburbs of Jos with her teenage niece, Fa'iza, and her young granddaughter, Ummi. Her husband was killed by a mob of religious zealots in Jos, and her first son Yaro was killed by the police. The book opens after their death and finds Binta extremely unhappy because she was not able to show affection to her firstborn son during his life due to tradition forbidding it. Binta has now aged, but has an unfulfilled inner desire of love and a sexual relationship she never had in all her life, but she is confronted with a cultural dilemma by the conservative society she lives in.
- Reza (Hassan Babale) is the supporting protagonist and a notorious thug. He is also a drug dealer and the chief thug at the San Siro, a local hideaway for petty thieves involved in mugging and drug dealing. They are also hired as political thugs for a dishonest politician, Senator Buba Maikudi, who uses them at political rallies and to intimidate opposition candidates.
- Senator Buba Maikudi is a selfish, rogue politician.

== Critical reviews ==
"[This] intense, compelling novel navigates violence and taboo sexuality, tenderness and longing, family and the individual. It reminds us, masterfully, about the irrevocable force of love and physical passion even in the face of brutality." –Indian novelist Namita Gokhale

The novel received many critical reviews and is seen by many as a departure from northern Nigeria's norm, with German broadcaster Deutsche Welle describing the author as a northern Nigerian "literary provocateur" for daring to speak openly about female sexuality, breaking a taboo in the deeply conservative northern Nigeria.

As the theme of the novel centers around the sexual emancipation of Hajiya Binta, who lives in a society where women are denied the right to sexual desire and certain activities, the book has drawn interest and reviews from many women writers and feminist activists, including Indian writer Namita Gokhale, Sudanese author Leila Aboulela, Ivorian novelist Veronique Tadjo, and United Kingdom-based writer Zoë Wicomb, the inaugural winner of the Windham–Campbell Literature Prize.

== Development and publication ==
Ibrahim has been asked many times whether the story reflects details from his own life, given the circumstances of the characters and the setting, but he has always maintained that although he was at one time compelled to relocate from Jos due to the violence, similar to Hajiya Binta, he was "conscious not to write him[self] into the story". However, he did think a fatwa would be issued against it after the book's release, alluding to the binding opinion issued by Islamic scholars on something deemed to be sacrilegious to Islam or popular norms.

=== Awards ===
In September 2016 the book was shortlisted for the Nigeria Prize for Literature, Africa's biggest literary prize. On 12 October 2016, Ibrahim was announced as the winner for Season of Crimson Blossoms, beating Elnathan John's Born on a Tuesday and past winner Chika Unigwe's Night Dancer, the two other finalists from the initial 173 nominated books.

== Bibliography ==
- Onyebuchi, James; Susan, Dauda (December 2016). "The Cultural Realms and Their Implications for Development: A study of Abubakar Adam Ibrahim's Season of Crimson Blossoms". Nile Journal of English Studies. 2 (3): 11–14. doi:10.20321/nilejes.v2i3.96.
