= Abubakar Gimba =

Nigerian author (born 1952)

Abubakar Gimba OFR
- Born: 10 March 1952; Lapai, Colonial Nigeria
- Died: 25 February 2015 (aged 62); Minna, Niger State, Nigeria
- Education: Government College Keffi; Ahmadu Bello University, Zaria
- Occupations: Economist; administrator; author
- Known for: literary works and Federal Appointments

President of Association of Nigerian Authors
- In office 1997–2001

president of Ahmadu Bello University alumni
- In office 1998–2001

Abubakar Gimba OFR (10 March 1952 – 25 February 2015) was an author, administrator and economist who was a former vice president of the Association of Nigerian Authors (ANA) and was elected president of the National association from 1997 to 2001. He was the founder of the prestigious Creative Writers Club( cwc) at Ahmadu Bello University Zaria in 1972. He is the first person from North Nigeria to hold both positions.

== Background ==
Born in Lapai town, Niger State. He began his early school at Gulu Primary School from 1959 to 1962, then went to Senior Primary School Lapai finished in 1964 and he proceeded to obtain his high school certificate from 1965 to 1969 at Government College Keffi then he attended Ahmadu Bello University Zaria from 1970 to 1974 for his first and second degree, he also attended University of Cincinmati in 1977 and University of Iowa for program service.

== Career ==
Gimba worked with the Union Bank of Nigeria and then the United Bank of Africa as executive directors. Prior to entering the corporate sector, he was a civil servant who rose within the administrative cadre to become Permanent Secretary, Ministry of Finance during the tenure of David Mark between 1984 and 1987. After his retirement from banking, he was nominated to work or advice in some public institutions. Gimba was appointed chairman University disciplinary committee in Ahmadu Bello University, his alma mater during the interim administration of Mamman Kontagora. Thereafter, Abdulsalami Abubakar made him member Programme Implementation Monitoring Committee till end of the former's term in 1999. Gimba is a former president, Ahmadu Bello University alumni association and was a member of Ahmadu Bello University Governing Council from 2002 to 2006. He is the first pro-chancellor of Ibrahim Badamasi Babangida University Lapai. He became an adviser to David Mark, senate president of Nigeria on economic and budget matter and in 2010, he was presidential advisor on various matters, he also served as member of presidential Review Committee on public service.

=== Writings ===
His experience with political institutions, the military and the civil service had some influence in his early works and in thematic depictions of religion, society and morality of those works.

His first novel, Trail of Sacrifice, was published in 1985, and it was followed by Witnesses to Tears, released in 1986. In 1991, he published Sunset of a Mandarin, in which readers were introduced to aspects of his life within the civil service. His 1994 work, Sacred Apples, explores African feminism in a Muslim society through the eyes of its female protagonist, Zahra.

Gimba's view on Nigeria's problems contradicts with Achebe's assertion that leadership is what is wrong in society; he takes a position that followers of political leaders and other members of society magnified societal problems in Nigeria.

== Works ==
Most of his books were published by Dillibe Onyeama at Delta Book Club, including:

- Abubakar Gimba. Trail of Sacrifice. ISBN 9782335940
- Abubakar Gimba. Witnesses to Tears: a novel. 1986. ISBN 9782335215
- Gimba Abubakar. Sunset for a Mandarin. 1991. West African Book Publishers. ISBN 9781530170
- Abubakar Gimba. Sacred Apples. 1994. Evans Brothers. ISBN 9780201378
- Footprints, 1998 and 2013, ISBN 9-780-23068-8, 9789780230685 OCLC 40632882
- A toast in the cemetery: collection of short stories. Abubakar Gimba 2002/2006,
- Inner rumblings: a collection of poems. Abubakar Gimba, 1980/2000, OCLC 44945707
- This land of ours, 2001/2006, ISBN 9782335908
- Once upon a reed, 1998/1999, OCLC 45438249
