= When We Were Fireflies =

2023 novel by Abubakar Adam Ibrahim

When We Were Fireflies is a literary fiction written by Abubakar Adam Ibrahim and published by Masobe Books in 2023.

== Reception ==
Olukorede Yishau, writing for The Lagos Review, compared it favourably to Gabriel García Márquez's One Hundred Years of Solitude and Ben Okri's The Famished Road, praising "his precise and elegant voice". Michael Chiedoziem Chukwudera of Open Country Mag gave it a 3.5 star rating, stating that it is "one of the best contemporary novels out of Nigeria". Both Yishuau and Chukwudera praised Ibrahim's prose-poetry style.
