= Bode Sowande =

Nigerian writer and dramatist

Bode Sowande (born 2 May 1948) is a Nigerian writer and dramatist, known for the theatric aesthetic of his plays about humanism and social change. He comes from a breed of writers in Nigeria that favors a post-traditional social and political landscape where the individual is the creator and maker of his own history not just the subject of norms and tradition. Sowande is a member of the so-called second generation of Nigerian playwrights, who favor a much more political tone in their writing and seek to promote an alliance or acquiescence to a change in the status quo and fate of the common man and farmers who constitute the majority of the Nigerian society. Some members of this groups includes: Zulu Sofola, Femi Osofisan and Festus Iyayi. Bode Sowande in May 2010, launched a tarot website Tarot With Prayers.

He runs the drama group "Odu Themes", established in 1972, and the "Bode Sowande Theatre Academy", an internship programme for dramatists. He is married, with children.

== Works ==
Novels and short stories

- The Night Before Babylon, 1972
- A Farewell to Babylon and Other Plays, 1978
- Flamingo and other plays, 1980
- Without A Home, novel, 1982
- Our Man The President, novel, 1983
- The Missing Bridesmaid, novelette, 1984

Plays

- Tornadoes Full of Dreams, drama, 1990
- Arede Owo, [Yoruba adaptation of Molière's L'Avare], drama,1990.
- Ajantala-Pinocchio, drama, 1997
- Super Leaf, drama, 2004
- Just For The Fun Of It [ An anecdotal history of Odu Themes Theatre], 2008, memoirs.
- Long Story, drama [on last days of Abacha and M.K.O Abiola], 2010
- Mammy Water's Wedding, 2014 (ISBN 978-978-921-0695)
- E-book, The Spellbinder, stage drama on mental health challenge, and love stories of three billionaires.

OkadaBooksApp.2021.

- E-book, Snapshots, drama on urban habitat with focus on slum dwellers, OkadaBooksApp, 2021.
- E-book, My WhatsApp Posts,

Social commentary in prose, from compiled WhatsApp posts of the author, OkadaBooks online. OkadaBooksApp.2022

Radio plays, broadcast on BBC African drama programmes; [1975-1996]

- Bar Beach Prelude,
- Get a Pigeon from Trafalgar Square,
- Beggars Choice,
- A Dream from the sun,
- Alarm on Lagoon Street,
- Regina's Golden Goal.

Television

- Odu Themes weekly Television programmes, Western Nigeria Television [ now NTA, Ibadan.]1973- 1978.
- Television drama series, 'Acada Campus', NIGERIA TELEVISION AUTHORITY [network ], 1981,1982.
- Flamingo, 13 part television serial, Oyo State Broadcasting Service,1983
- Without a Home, TV 13 episode serial, Oyo State Broadcasting Service, 1984
- TarotWithPrayers

== Notes ==
New e-book by Bode Sowande, The Spellbinder, drama, OkadaBooksApp.

New e-book by Bode Sowande, Snapshots, drama, OkadaBooksApp.
