= Ties That Tether =

2020 novel by Jane Igharo

- Author: Jane Igharo
- Language: English
- Genre: Fiction
- Publisher: Berkley
- Publication date: 29 September 2020
- ISBN: 978-0-593-10194-0

Ties That Tether is a novel by is a novel by Jane Igharo, a Nigerian fiction writer. The novel centers around Azere, a woman who promised her late father she will marry a Nigerian.

== Plot ==
This novel centers around Azere who makes a promise to her dying father, while at the age of 12, to marry a Nigerian man and to uphold her cultural heritage, even after relocating to Canada. However, her mother's relentless efforts to arrange traditional Nigerian matches for Azere lead to a chance encounter with Rafael Castellano, a tall, handsome, and white man, which results in a one-night stand. As their relationship deepens unexpectedly, Azere struggles with different emotions between her growing love for Rafael and her commitment to her family's expectations.

== Characters ==
- Azere: The protagonist of the story, a Nigerian immigrant living in Canada who made a promise to her dying father to marry a Nigerian man and uphold her cultural heritage. She struggles with conflicting emotions as her one-night stand with Rafael evolves into a serious relationship, forcing her to confront questions of identity and familial expectations.
- Rafael Castellano: Tall, handsome, and white, Rafael is the man with whom Azere has a one-night stand that unexpectedly turns into a serious relationship. He challenges Azere's notions of cultural identity and acceptance, leading her to question whether loving him compromises her Nigerian heritage.
- Azere's mother: A key figure in Azere's life who is determined to see her daughter marry a Nigerian man and preserve their cultural traditions. She pressures Azere to adhere to her cultural expectations, adding to Azere's internal conflict.
- Azere's father: Though deceased, Azere's father's dying wish for her to marry a Nigerian man influences much of the conflict in the story. His expectation weighs heavily on Azere's conscience as she navigates her relationship with Rafael.
