= Jane Igharo =

Nigerian Canadian writer

- Born: Jane Abeiyuwa Igharo
- Education: University of Toronto
- Occupation: Writer
- Writing career
- Period: 2020–present
- Genres: Romance, fiction

Jane Abeiyuwa Igharo is a Nigerian fiction writer of contemporary romance novels. She is best known for her debut novel Ties That Tether.

== Early life ==
Jane Igharo was born in Nigeria to parents from Edo State and spent most of her childhood in the country before she immigrated alongside her family to Canada at the age of twelve. She pursued her education and earned a Journalism degree from the University of Toronto after which she worked as a communications specialist in Ontario, Canada.

Growing up as the child of immigrants, Igharo stated that her family had great expectations for her and she was told by her mother that she could not date or marry outside her ethnicity in a bid to ensure that continuity of their culture in a western setting. This eventually gave her the idea and concept of her debut novel.

== Career ==
Igharo's debut novel, Ties That Tether inspired by her personal life and Immigrant experiences was published by Berkley on 29 September 2020, and received mainly positive feedback from critics and readers. Her second novel, The Sweetest Remedy was published in September 2021 and is an Amazon, it received positive reviews.

Where We End & Begin, Igharo's third novel was published in 2022 and is also an Amazon Editors pick.

== Bibliography ==
- Ties That Tether- Berkley (29 September 2020)
- The Sweetest Remedy – Berkley (28 September 2021)
- Where We End & Begin – Berkley (27 September 2022)
- Sisi Americanah (forthcoming, 2023)
