= Chin Ce =

Nigerian writer

- Born: 1966 (age 59–60)
- Education: University of Calabar
- Occupation: Author

Chin Ce (born in 1966) is a Nigerian writer of poetry, fiction and essays and a graphic editor.

== Biography ==
He was educated at the University of Calabar. He is the author of a fiction trilogy, Children of Koloko, Gamji College and The Visitor.

== Works ==
Chin Ce is also the author of three volumes of poetry: An African Eclipse, Full Moon and Millennial.

His two volumes of essays, Bards and Tyrants: Essays in Contemporary African Writing and Riddles and Bash: African Performance and Literature Reviews, evaluate some aspects and visions of African writing and criticism in the works of Chinua Achebe, Ngugi wa Thiong'o, Wole Soyinka, Nwoga, Chinweizu, Ernest Emenyonu, Nnolim and other new poetry, prose and critical voices from around the continent.

A writer of deep insight and imaginative power, author of a book of stories, The Dreamer and the Oracle dedicated to Chinua Achebe, Ce also edited African Short Stories vol 1 and several works of criticism of African literature.

Ce's recent work, such as The Dreamer and the Oracle, traverse a far wider dimension of cosmic interdependency, often repeating previous motifs of the religious and political mindlessness which impoverish the African landscape. His 2013 work The Oracle honours a shamanistic teacher and storyteller who, with his spiritual double helps to liberate the protagonist from an insidious mind control programme by a dark power that bestrides humanity through several ages of chaos. In The Dreamer, which has been called an ambitious work of fiction, Chin Ce which tries to investigate the nature of human struggle from both internal and external dimensions of conflict and its resolution.

Using the narrative mode of third person omniscience in the first part of the story and exploring the dimensions of myth legend and history, Ce tells the story of violence and betrayal in African politics and leadership.
