= Uchechukwu Umezurike =

Nigerian author

Uchechukwu Peter Umezurike
- Citizenship: Nigeria

Academic background
- Education: Abia State University (BSc), University of Port Harcourt (MA), University of Alberta (PhD)

Academic work
- Discipline: Literary Criticism
- Institutions: University of Calgary
- Main interests: Postcolonial Literature, Gender and Sexuality Studies, Masculinities, Cultural Studies, Critical Race Theory, Creative Writing

Uchechukwu Peter Umezurike, also known as Uche Peter Umez, is a Nigerian author and academic currently working as an assistant professor of English at the University of Calgary. In addition to publishing several works of children’s fiction, short fiction, and poetry, his academic research draws from gender studies and critical race theory to analyze African, African diaspora, postcolonial, and global literatures as well as film.

== Education and career ==
Umezurike split most of his early years between Lagos and Owerri, although he traveled a lot and lived in many cities and states. He began his postsecondary education at Abia State University in Uturu, Nigeria. He was originally interested in embarking on a career in finance and enrolled in business administration and banking programs, though he later switched to a government and public administration program, which he completed in 1997. Yet, neither field captured his curiosity. It was at this time that Umezurike became interested in English literature as a way to fend off boredom, as well as to cope with the terror and despair he experienced during the tyrannical Sani Abacha regime of the 1990s.

Umezurike went on to experiment with various genres following the completion of his undergraduate studies. In 2004, he published Dark through the Delta (2004), a poetry collection, followed by Tears in Her Eyes (2005), a collection of short stories, and Sam and the Wallet (2007), a work of children’s fiction. Following his early success, he enrolled in several residency programs for international writers, including the International Writing Program in Iowa City in 2008, the Château de Lavigny writer residency in Switzerland in 2010, and the Civitella Ranieri Foundation residency in Italy in 2012.

Umezurike’s academic career began when he attended in the University of Port Harcourt to pursue a master’s degree in English Literature. He completed his master’s thesis in 2014, focusing on the sexual objectification of women in two West African novels; Beyond the Horizon by Ghanaian author Amma Darko, and On Black Sisters’ Street by Nigerian author Chika Unigwe. His interest in researching how representations of gender in Nigerian Literature are informed by ideologies and norms that define how society should recognize, relate to, and accept or even affirm people led him to join the Ph.D. in English at Film Studies program at the University of Alberta in Edmonton, Canada. Under the supervision of Lahoucine Ouzgane, he completed his doctoral dissertation in 2021, focusing on representations of gender and sexuality in novels by Igbo authors with an eye toward images of men and women who have reimagined, enforced, or even challenged masculinity. In that same year, he was awarded the 2021 Nigeria Prize for Literary Criticism, considered the foremost prize for literary criticism in Africa, in recognition of the depth, rigor, and significance of three academic essays published during his time as a doctoral student.

Following the completion of his graduate studies, Umezurike became the inaugural recipient of the University of Calgary’s Provost’s Postdoctoral Awards for Indigenous and Black Scholars. His current project considers how African Canadian filmmakers and writers imagine their new home in Canada, particularly within the context of Indigenous Peoples and their sovereignty, bridging a gap in literary scholarship on African migrants’ narratives of Canada. Further, Umezurike has continued producing works of creative writing in addition to his academic pursuits. In 2021, he published Wish Maker, another children’s novel, as well as another short story collection, Double Wahala, Double Trouble. His latest poetry collection, there’s more, was released in March 2023.

Umezurike's children's book, Wish Maker was longlisted for the 2024 Nigeria Prize for Literature.

== Literary works ==
- Please Don’t Interrupt (co-authored with Rona Altrows). Griots Lounge (2025).

=== Poetry ===
- there’s more. University of Alberta Press (2023).
- Aridity of Feelings (Edu-Edy Publications, 2006)
- Dark through the Delta (Edu-Edy Publications, 2004)

=== Short fiction ===
- Double Wahala, Double Trouble. Griots Lounge Publishing (2021).
- Tears in Her Eyes. Edu-Edy Publications (2005).

=== Children's Fiction ===
- Wish Maker. Masobe Books (2021).
- Gogo and the Slimy Green Grub. Lantern Books (2018).
- Tim the Monkey and Other Stories. Africana First Publishers (2013).
- The Boy Who Throws Stones at Animals and Other Stories. Melrose Books (2011).
- The Runaway Hero. Jalaa Writers’ Collective (2011).
- Sam and the Wallet. Funtime TV Enterprises (2007).

=== Essays ===
- “The Story is an Egg, or Five Fragments.” The Shallow Tales Review (2022).
- “The Intimacy of Words, or a Better Way of Being.” Iskanchi (2021).

== Scholarly publications ==
=== Books ===
- Masculinities in Nigerian Fiction: Receptivity and Gender. Edinburgh University Press (2025).

=== Journal articles and book chapters ===
- “‘Omelora’: Orthodox and Disciplinary Masculinities in Chimamanda Ngozi Adichie’s Purple Hibiscus.” (2022).
- “The Eco(centric) Border Man: Masculinities and the Nonhuman in Jim Lynch’s Border Songs.” (2021)
- “Self-publishing in the era of military rule in Nigeria, 1985-1999.” (2019)
- “Postcolonial Ogres in Ngũgĩ wa Thiong’o’s Wizard of the Crow.” (2018)
- “Land of cemetery: funereal images in the poetry of Musa Idris Okpanachi.” (2018)

== Awards and grants ==
- Winner Nigeria Prize for Literary Criticism, Nigeria, 2021.
- Provost Award for Indigenous and Black Scholars, University of Calgary, 2021.
- Edmonton Arts Council Grant, Edmonton, 2021.
- James Patrick Folinsbee Memorial Scholarship in Creative Writing, University of Toronto, 2020.
- Vanier Graduate Scholarship Award, Canada, 2018.
- Shortlisted, Nigeria LNG Prize for Literature, 2011.
- Laureate, UNESCO-Aschberg, Sanskriti Kendra, India, 2009.
- Alumnus, Caine Prize for African Writing Workshop, Accra, Ghana, 2009.
- Fellow, Civitella Ranieri, Italy, 2012.
