= Parrésia Publishers =

Book publishing company in Nigeria

Parrésia, also Parrésia Publishers Ltd, is a publishing company in Nigeria founded by Azafi Omoluabi and Richard Ali in 2012 with the aim of selling books to the Nigerian reading audience and promote the freedom of the imagination and the free press. It was described in 2017 by The New York Times as one of "a handful of influential new publishing houses" in Africa in the last decade.

== Authors ==
- Helon Habila, winner of the Caine Prize and Commonwealth Writers' Prize for Fiction. His novel Oil on Water was shortlisted for the Orion Environmental Book Award and Pen/Opera Book Award in 2012. Oil on Water was also nominated for the Best Novel Commonwealth Writers' Prize Africa Region in 2011.
- Chika Unigwe (winner of NLNG Prize 2012)
- Abubakar Adam Ibrahim (winner of LNG Prize 2016 for Season of Crimson Blossoms, published by Parrésia Books in 2015).
- Ogaga Ifowodo, whose poetry collection A Good Mourning was shortlisted for NLNG Prize in 2017
- Pius Adesanmi, a Nigerian columnist and professor at Carleton University in Canada.
