= Grit (play) =

2023 play by Obari Gomba

Grit is a 2023 family saga play written by Nigerian playwright Obari Gomba published in 2023. It won the 2023 Nigeria Prize for Literature.

Nzube Nlebedim in a review for Brittle Paper called it magnificent and multifaceted, praising Gomba's didactic prose. Lindsay Barrett in Leadership described it as "a cautionary tale in which the reader or the onlooker is being alerted to the resilience and determined existence of GRIT as a quality of life. ... a wholesome commentary on Nigeria's contemporary political circumstance."

In The Personal as the Political: A Postcolonial-Formalist Review, Eyo Etim described Obari Gomba’s Grit as deriving its strength from the nuances of its language and its manner of ideation. " Grit by Obari Gomba is full of images, symbols, thought provoking concepts to make us rethink our political process and be spurred to engage, partake and not stay aloof or become armchair critics," says Don Kester for BoldscholarNews.
