= Olufemi Obafemi =

Nigerian poet and academic

Olu Obafemi
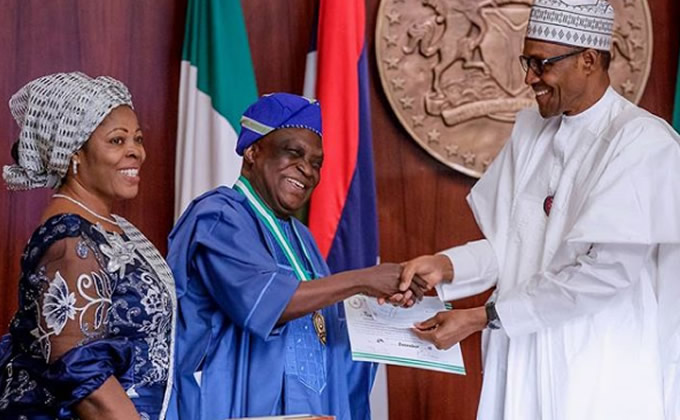
- Prof. Obafemi (middle) receiving a National Award in 2018 from President Muhammadu Buhari (right) with his wife behind him.
- Born: 4 April 1950 (age 76)
- Education: Ahmadu Bello University University of Sheffield University of Leeds
- Occupations: Poet, playwright, author
- Notable work: Nights of a Mystical Beasts; The New Dawn; Suicide Syndrome; Naira Has No Gender; The Love Twirls of Adiitu-Olodumare; Iyunade
- Honours: Nigerian National Order of Merit (2018)

Olufemi Obafemi (born 4 April 1950) is a Nigerian poet, playwright, author and Professor of English and Dramatic Literature at the University of Ilorin since October 1990. He is the 76th recipient of the Nigerian National Order of Merit (NMOM) award (2018). He was the President of the Nigerian Academy of Letters between 2016 and 2018, when he was succeeded by Francis Egbokhare.

== Early life and education ==
Olu Obafemi (as he is popularly called) was born in Akutupa-Kiri, Kabba/Bunu Local Government Area of Kogi State, Nigeria. He had his elementary education in Kabba before moving to Government Secondary School, Dekina and later Titcombe College, Egbe for his secondary education.

In 1975, he obtained a Bachelor of Arts degree in English at the Ahmadu Bello University, Zaria and later proceeded to England, where he obtained an MA in English (1975) at the University of Sheffield, and a PhD (1981) also in English at the University of Leeds.

== Works ==
His first play Pestle on the Mortar, which was written while he was still an undergraduate, was produced in 1974 and broadcast by the Kaduna Broadcasting Corporation. He has published a number of other plays like Nights of a Mystical Beast (1986), The New Dawn (1986), Suicide Syndrome (1993), Naira Has No Gender (1993),The Love Twirls of Adiitu-Olodumare (2016), and Iyunade (2016).

== Research contributions ==
Obafemi is believed to have pioneered an experimental tool for revolutionary aesthetics in Africa, typifying the plays of second generation Nigerian and African dramatist. His work has also influenced the interpretation of radical drama among theatre scholars in West Africa in the 1980s and 90s. He has also contributed to advancing the discourse on post-feminist aesthetics in Nigeria drama to the engagement in material perception of society.

== Positions held ==
Olufemi Obafemi was the chairman of the Association of Nigerian Authors (ANA), Ilorin branch, Kwara State, in 1998 and he served as the National President of the Association from 2001 to 2005. He was also a Director of Research at the National Institute of Policy and Strategic Studies (NIPSS), a former President of the Association of Nigerian Authors and chairman of the board of directors of the National Commission for Museums and Monuments. He is currently the National Chairman of the Nigerian Reproduction Rights Society of Nigeria (REPRONIG)[June 2019]. He is an editorial consultant and columnist in several of Nigeria's national newspaper.

== Awards ==
1. Nigerian National Order Merit (NNOM), 2018
