= A Father's Pride =

2024 novel by Ndidi Chiazor-Enenmo

- Author: Ndidi Chiazor-Enenmo
- Language: English
- Publisher: Kays House of Publishing
- Publication date: 2024
- Publication place: Nigeria
- Pages: 146
- ISBN: 978-978-784-660-5

A Father's Pride is a novel by Ndidi Chiazor-Enenmo. Published by Kays House of Publishing in Nigeria, the novel was shortlisted for the 2024 Nigeria Prize for Literature.

== Background ==
Chiazor Enenmor had her BA in English and library science from the University of Nigeria and her MA in English literature from the University of Lagos.
