= Akachi Adimora-Ezeigbo =

Nigerian author and educator

- Born: Eastern Nigeria
- Education: University of Lagos; University of Ibadan
- Occupations: Author and educator
- Awards: Nigeria Prize for Literature

Akachi Adimora-Ezeigbo // is a Nigerian author and educator, whose published work includes novels, poetry, short stories, books for children, essays and journalism. She is the winner of several awards, including the Nigeria Prize for Literature.

== Biography ==
Akachi Adimora-Ezeigbo was born and raised in Eastern Nigeria, but now lives in Lagos. She is the first child of Joshua and Christiana Adimora and has five siblings. Raised partially in a rural environment and partially in the city, she combines these two factors, as background and setting for her children's stories and adult fiction. Though born in Eastern Nigeria, she has lived in different parts of the country – East, North and West. She has travelled extensively in Africa, Europe and in the USA.

She obtained her Bachelor of Arts (BA) and Master's (MA) degrees in English from the University of Lagos and her Ph.D. from University of Ibadan, in Nigeria. She also has a Postgraduate Diploma in Education (PGDE) from University of Lagos.

A lecturer, writer, novelist, critic, essayist, journalist, and administrator, she was appointed a professor of English at University of Lagos in 1999. She has taught in this university, in the Department of English, since 1981. She headed the English Department in 1997 and 1998, from 2002 to 2005, and 2008–2009. In September 2015, she relocated to Federal University Ndufu-Alike, Ikwo, Ebonyi State, in South-East Nigeria, where she has continued to teach students and mentor younger lecturers.

She is married to Professor Chris Ezeigbo and they have three children.

== Professional experience ==
She taught in secondary schools and a teachers college before becoming a university lecturer. She was a member of the editorial board of two newspapers in Lagos: The Independent (1992–1995) and The Post Express (1997–1999). While with those two newspapers, she wrote editorials, feature articles and maintained regular columns. She has held administrative posts at the University of Lagos as sub-dean of the Faculty of Arts for two years (1992–1994) and as acting head of English Department in 1997/98. She has also been in hall administration in the university as assistant hall warden in Moremi Hall and Moremi Annexe from 1981 to 1984; hall mistress of Madam Tinubu Hall from 1994 to 1996, hall mistress of Amina Hall from 1996 to 1997.

She was the national treasurer of the Association of Nigerian Authors from 1995 to 1997, vice president of Women Writers of Nigeria (WRITA) from 1998 to 2000. She went on to become the first vice-president of PEN Nigeria and the financial secretary of WRITA National.

Research supervision
Undergraduate Level: Supervised more than 160 final-year undergraduate projects at Unilag (B.A. (Hons.), 1986–2015). And, so far, 12 projects at Federal University Ndufu-Alike, Ikwo (2015–2022).
Postgraduate (Masters): Supervised more than 100 M.A. dissertations between 1986 and 2015 at Unilag.
Postgraduate (Ph.D.): Under her supervision 12 candidates successfully completed their PhD and graduated between 2003 and 2018 at Unilag. currently supervising a doctoral (PhD) student at Alex Ekwueme Federal University Ndufu-Alike, Ebonyi State.
Postgraduate Diploma (PGD): Supervised six students in the Postgraduate Diploma programme at the University of Lagos Between 2012 and 2014.

External examination/professional assessment
She has served as external examiner/assessor to various universities (15) in the country:

- Obafemi Awolowo University, Ile-Ife
- University of Benin
- University of Calabar
- University of Jos
- University of Ilorin
- Abia State University
- Rivers State University of Science & Technology
- Redeemer's University (RUN), Mowe, Ogun State
- Olabisi Onabanjo University, Ago-Iwoye, Ogun State
- University of Nigeria, Nsukka
- Lagos State University (LASU)
- Covenant University, Ota, Ogun State
- University of Ibadan
- Babcock University, Ilisan-Remo, Ogun State
- American University of Nigeria, Yola, Adamawa State
- University of Lagos (2019).

Reading tours

She has toured many countries and in each of them she has read from her works.
In October/November, 1993, she toured six British cities – London, Bristol, Leicester, Liverpool, Manchester, Nottingham – and gave readings from her first collection of short stories, Rhythms of Life, Stories of Modern Nigeria. The tour was organized by Karnak House (her London publisher). In May 1998, she was a guest of the Centre for African Studies of the University of Edinburgh at a Literary Retreat at the Burn, in Scotland. She also read from her works at Evangelische Akademie, in Bad Boll, Germany, in October 2000 and also at Humboldt University in Berlin, in May 2002. She participated in "Time of the Writer Festival" in April 2002, at the Centre for Creative Arts, University of KwaZulu Natal, Durban, in South Africa. She was at the 2002 Convention of International PEN held in Macedonia. she presented a paper at the Indaba at the Zimbabwe International Book Fair in Harare from 25 July to 2 August 2003.

Membership

She is a member of many academic associations such as the Literary Society of Nigeria, Modern Languages Association of Nigeria. She is an active member of writers' organizations including International PEN, PEN Nigeria, Association of Nigerian Authors (ANA) and the Women Writers Association of Nigeria (WRITA).
She is the first vice-president of PEN Nigeria. She served as the National Treasurer of ANA from 1995 to 1997 and the first vice president of Women Writers' Association of Nigeria. She is currently the financial secretary of WRITA.

== Finished publications ==
Apart from publishing more than 60 academic papers in local and international journals and as chapters in books and having her short stories appear in five anthologies, Adimora-Ezeigbo has published 48 books.
She has published 23 books for children (more are in the press), has been a children's Sunday School teacher and regularly gives talks to children in schools and to women's clubs on topics such as culture and youth development in Nigeria, child upbringing and the education of the girl-child, etc.

=== Children's books ===
Two of her stories for children have been translated into Swahili and Xhosa languages. Her books are listed below:

- The Buried Treasure (Junior African Writers Series), Oxford: Heinemann, 1992. Swahili translation: Hazina Iliyojikwa (Junior African Writers Series), Oxford: Heinemann, 1996.
- The Prize (Junior African Writers Series), Oxford: Heinemann, 1994.
- Alani the Troublemaker & Other Stories, Literamed Publications, 2003.
- Asa and the Little Stream, Literamed Publications, 2004.
- Whisker the Brave Cat, Literamed Publication, 2005.
- Red One and the Wizard of Mula, Literamed Publication, 2005.
- Snake Child and Star Baby, Literamed Publication, 2006.
- Ezezemale and the Tree Spirits, Literamed Publications, 2006.
- Sunshine, the Miracle Child, Literamed Publications, 2006.
- Heart Songs (poems). Ibadan: Kraft Books Ltd., 2009.
- Clouds and Other Poems for Children. Ibadan: University Press Ltd., 2009.
- Ako the Storyteller. (children's novel). Ikeja, Lagos: Lantern Books, 2009.
- Zoba and his Gang. (children's novel). Ikeja, Lagos: Lantern Books, 2009.
- Things Fall Apart @ 50, Special Edition, LARES, A Journal of Language and Literary Studies, Vol. 16. No 3 (2008). Edited with Dr. Adetokunbo Pearse.
- Waiting for Dawn (poems) (Ibadan: Kraft Books Ltd.) 2010.
- The Slave Girl. (children's novel) Lagos: Eph Communications Ltd, 2010.
- The Dwarf's Story. (children's novel) Lagos: Eph Communications Ltd, 2010.
- The Return of the Thief. (children's novel) Lagos: Eph Communications Ltd, 2010.
- The Boy and his Dog (children's novel) Lagos: Eph Communications Ltd, 2010.
- Hands that Crush Stone (play). Ibadan: University Press Plc, 2010.
- Barmaid and the Witches of Izunga. (play) Ibadan: University Press Plc, 2010.
- Roses and Bullets (novel). Lagos: Jalaa Writers' Collective, 2011.
- Toki Learns the Hard Way. Lagos: Melrose Books and Publishing Ltd, 2011.
- Mina the Shy Girl. Lagos: Melrose Books and Publishing Ltd., 2011.
- Kidnapped at Noon. Lagos: Melrose Books and Publishing Ltd., 2012.
- Mina the Shy Girl. Lagos: Melrose Books and Publishing Ltd., 2012.
- Seyi's Strong Voice. Lagos: Melrose Books and Publishing Ltd., 2012.
- Dancing Mask, Ibadan: Kraft Books, 2013.
- Singing in the Rain & Other Poems for Children. Ibadan: University Press, 2014.
- Ona and the Dwarf (co-authored with Odinaka Azubuike). Benin: God Scholars' Publishers (GSP), 2014.
- The Eagle and Other Poems for Secondary Schools. Benin: God Scholars' Publishers (GSP), 2014.
- Footmarks: Poems on One Hundred Years of Nigeria's Nationhood. Co-edited with Naza Amaeze Okoli. Ikeja, Lagos: ICS Services Limited, 2014.
- Mixed Legacies. Ibadan: University Press, 2019.

=== Fiction ===
- The Last of the Strong Ones (novel), Lagos: Vista Books, 1996.
- House of Symbols (novel), Lagos: Oracle Books Limited, 2001.
- Children of the Eagle (novel), Lagos: Vista Books, 2002.
- Rhythms of Life (short stories), London: Karnak House, 1992.
- Echoes in the Mind (short stories), Foundation Publishers, 1994/ Vista Books, 1996.
- Rituals & Departures (short stories), London: Karnak House, 1996.
- Fratures & Fragments (short stories) Lagos, African Cultural Institute, 2006.
- Adventures of Anum the Tortoise. Lagos: Lantern Books, Literamed Publications, 2006.
- My Cousin Sammy, Ikorodu: The Book Company, 2007.
- Fire from the Holy Mountain, Ibadan: University Press, 2007.
- Trafficked. Ikeja: Lantern Books, Literamed Publication, 2008.
- Heart Songs (poems), Ibadan: Kraftbooks, 2009.
- Magic Breast Bags. Ibadan: University Press PLC, 2019.
- Silver Lining. An Anthology of Nigerian Literature. Co-edited with Folu Agoi. A publication of PEN Nigeria Centre. 2019.
- Metaphor for Happiness & Other Stories. G.M.T. Emezue, Akachi Adimora-Ezeigbo et al. (eds). Alex Ekwueme Federal University Ndufu-Alike Press. 2019.
- Tolerance & Other Poems. G.M.T. Emezue, Akachi Adimora-Ezeigbo et al. (eds). Alex Ekwueme Federal University Ndufu-Alike Press. 2019.
- Contours of Tolerance. G.M.T. Emezue, Akachi Adimora-Ezeigbo et al. (eds). Alex Ekwueme Federal University Ndufu-Alike Press. 2019.
- Resident Alien & Other Stories. Ada Uzoamaka Azodo and Akachi Adimora-Ezeigbo (eds). Goldline & Jacobs, USA, 2020.
- A Million Bullets and a Rose. London: Abibiman Publishing, UK. 2022.
- Broken Bodies, Damaged Souls & Other Poems. Lagos: Purple Shelves Limited, 2022.
- Do Not Burn my Bones & Other Stories. Lagos: Purple Shelves Limited, 2022.

=== Non-fiction ===
- Fact & Fiction in the Literature of the Nigerian Civil War, Lagos: Unity Publishing & Research Company, 1992.
- Gender Issues in Nigeria – A Feminine Perspective, Lagos: Vista Books, 1996.
- A Companion to the Novel, Lagos: Vista Books, 1998.
- The Literatures of War (edited with Liz Gunner), SOAS, University of London.
- Wings of Dawn: An Anthology of New Writing by Nigerian Women (edited with Ronnie Uzoigwe), British Council, Lagos, 2006.
- Literature, Language and National Consciousness (edited with K. King-Aribisala), Lagos: University of Lagos Press, 2006.
- Snail-Sense Feminism: Building on an Indigenous Model. Faculty of Arts, University of Lagos, 2012.

=== Other books ===
- Wings of Dawn, An Anthology of New Writing by Nigerian Women, co-editor with Ronnie Uzoigwe, British Council/WRITA (Lagos), 2006

Essays

- "When a novelist writes a play" by Chika Abanobi, The Spectator, 20–26 February 2009, p. 41.
- "Escape into poetry, audacity of pidgin," by Akeem Lasisi. The Punch, Tuesday, 19 May 2009, p. 46.
- "Akachi Adimora-Ezeigbo's Post-Inaugural Harvest," by Ezechi Onyerionwu, Sunday Vanguard, 14 June 2009. P. 47.
- "10 Most Significant Contemporary Nigerian Novelists," by Henry Akubuiro, The National Life, 22 March 2009, p. 21.
- "Profile of a Role Model, Prof. Akachi Adimora-Ezeigbo", in Growing Up, Action Health Incorporated, Vol. 17, No 14, December 2009, p. 20.

=== Articles published in academic journals ===
- Ezeigbo, T. A. (1982). "The Grotesque in Armah's Fiction". The Journal of Literary Society of Nigeria (JSLN), vol. 1, pp. 36–45.
- — (1982). "Rebels Against Igbo Traditional Values: A Study of two of Ekwensi's Igbo Heroines", in Journal of SPILC, Vol. 1, pp. 51–54.
- — (1983–1991). "A Sign of the Times: Social Criticism in Alex La Guma's Time of the Butcherbird" in Selected Acts of the MLAN Conference in Calabar. Appeared also in Literary Half Yearly (Mysore: India, 32, 1, 1991).
- — (1984/85). "Ola Rotimi and the Oedipus Legacy", in Lagos Review of English Studies (LARES), Vol. VI. VII, pp. 175–185.
- — (1988). "Artistic Responsibility: Male Characterization in Buchi Emecheta's Novels", in LARES, Vol. 10, pp. 126–136.
- — (1988). "Functionality in Literature: Art and Propaganda" in Savana, A Journal of Environmental and Social Sciences (Zaria: Ahmadu Bello University), Vol. 10, No. 1, pp. 78–83.
- — (1990). "Traditional Women's Institutions in Igbo Society: Implications for the Igbo Female Writer" in African Languages and Cultures (London: SOAS, University of London) 3, 2, pp. 149–165.
- — (1992). "The Clash of Ideals in Hemingway's For Whom the Bell Tolls", in LARES. Vols XI–XII, 1989–92. pp. 240–252.
- — (1993). "The Enemy Within: Women Against Women in Novels by Selected Nigerian Female Writers" in Ihafa – A Journal of African Studies, Vol. 1, No. 1, 1992–1993, pp. 1–13.
- — (1997). "Technique and Language in Ba's So Long a Letter, El Saadawi's Women at Point Zero and Warner-Vieyra's Juletane, in CALEL (Currents in African Literature and the English Language), University of Calabar, Vol. 1, No. 1, March 1997, pp. 113–125.
- — (1999). "Gender in African Literature: The Politics of Exclusion and Inclusion" in Lagos Notes & Records, Vol. 8, pp. 25–45.
- — (2000). "The Dynamics of Literary Response: Students as Readers of African Women's Writing" in Reading Africa: African Research & Documentation – A Special Issue of Journal of the Standing Conference on Library Materials on Africa, No. 83. Produced jointly with the African Studies Centre, University of Cambridge, U.K., 2000, pp. 37–47.
- — (2003). "An Acid in the Feel of Things': The Short Fiction of Ben Okri", in Lagos Review of English Studies (LARES), University of Lagos, vol. 14 Nos. 1&2, pp. 105–119.
- — (2005). "From the Horse's Mouth: The Politics of Remembrance in Women's Writing on the Nigerian Civil War", in Body, Sexuality, and Gender: Versions & Subversions in African Literature 1, edited by F. Veit-Wild & D. Naguschewski, Special Issue of Matatu: Journal for African Culture & Society, Amsterdam – New York, NY 2005.
- — (2008) "The Poetry of War: Chinua Achebe and Siegfried Sassoon", in Things Fall apart @ 50, edited by Akachi Ezeigbo & Adetokunbo Pearse, Special Issue of LARES: A Journal of Language and Literary Studies, Vol. 16. No 3 (2008)
- — (2013) "The Lizard and the Iroko: Reflections on Nigerian Literature 23 and Criticism since the 1960s" in Journal of Nigerian English and Literature (JONEL), Volume 9, January 2013, pp. 42–54.
- — (2017) "Unity in Diversity in the Household of African Feminism: A Response to Di-Feminism" in Journal of Igbo Studies Association (ISA, USA), Special Edition, 2017.
- — (2017) "Justice Begets Peace: Literature, Insecurity and Societal Reorientation", in Journal of the Literary Society of Nigeria (JLSN), Issue 9, June 2017, pp. 19–31.
- — (2018) "Synthesizing Difference: Transcultural Movements in Contemporary African and African Diaspora Literature" in Currents in African Literature and the English Language (CALEL), Volume VIII, May 2018, pp. 1–7.
- — (2019) "Balancing the Gender Equation in the Criticism of African Literature", in African Literature Today (ALT), 37. 2019, pp. 88–103.

== Honours and awards ==
- Three-year academic scholarship awarded by the Federal Government of Nigeria Scholarship Board (at undergraduate level). 1971–1974
- December 1975, Awarded 2nd Prize in the Christmas Short Story Competition organized by Nigerian Broadcasting Corporation (NBC)
- 1989/90 Session Commonwealth Fellowship Award: Awarded a Development Fellowship by the Association of Commonwealth Universities tenable at School of Oriental and African Studies of the University of London [Post-Doctoral].
- August 1994 – won 1st Prize in the Nationwide Short Story Competition about Social Aspects of Women and Their Activities organized by Women's Research and Documentation Centre (WORDOC) Institute of African Studies, University of Ibadan.
- British Council Fellow at the University of Cambridge, UK, in 1998
- A special guest of the Centre for African Studies, University of Edinburgh, Scotland, at a Literary Retreat at the Burn in Scotland in 1998.
- Research fellow at the University of Natal, Pietermaritzburg, South Africa, from 1 August 1999 to 31 July 2000 in the English Studies Department in the School of Language, Culture and Communication.
- 2001 – House of Symbols (novel) won the ANA/Spectrum Prize for fiction.
- 2001 – House of Symbols won Zulu Sofola Prize for Women Writing.
- 2003 – First winner of ANA/NDDC Flora Nwapa Prize for Women Writing.
- 2004 – House of Symbols (along with two other books) received US$5,000 under the Nigeria Prize for Literature sponsored by Nigeria LNG Ltd.
- 2004 – House of Symbols selected as one of 25 Best Books written over the past 25 years (1978–2003) by Spectrum Books, Ibadan.
- A recipient of the "Women Glass Ceiling Crashers Award" (awarded by the Women Writers Association of Nigeria – WRITA) – 2004.
- Awarded a visiting fellowship by the Institute of African Studies, University of Bayreuth, Germany, as Guest Scholar, from 1 November – 31 December 2005.
- Received 2005 Best Researcher Award in the Arts and Humanities, in the University of Lagos, Akoka, Lagos.
- Honoured as 'A Model of Achievement' by The African Cultural Institute and Zenith Bank Plc, in 2005.
- Children of the Eagle was runner-up (second position) for the Pat Utomi Literature Prize – 2005
- Snake Child and Star Baby was runner-up for the ANA/Atiku Abubakar Prize for Children's Literature – 2005
- Awarded a research fellowship (as a visiting research fellow) at Royal Holloway, University of London, UK, from 1 October 2006 to 30 September 2007.
- Joint winner of 2007 NLNG (The Nigeria Prize for Literature) in the Children Category with children's novel My Cousin Sammy – 2007.
- Honoured with Long & Distinguished Service Award of the University of Lagos on 19 April 2007.
- Fire from the Holy Mountain (children's novel) won the ANA/Atiku Abubakar Children's Literature Prize – 2008.
- Heart Songs (Poetry collection) won the ANA/Cadbury Poetry Prize – 2009 – Trafficked was runner-up for the ANA/NDDC Flora Nwapa Prize for Women Writing.
- Nominated as "Most Admired Lecturer" by students of the English Department, University of Lagos – 2010
- Received 'Outstanding Contribution Award' from His Excellency, Rt. Hon. Chibuike Rotimi Amaechi, Executive Governor of Rivers State at the Garden City Literary Festival (GCLF), 10 December 2010, in Port Harcourt, "in recognition of the vivid colours she has added to Nigerian Literature".
- Awarded the Fellowship of the Literary Society of Nigeria (FLSN).
- Roses and Bullets was runner-up (Second position) for the ANA/NDDC Ken Saro-Wiwa Prize for Prose Fiction -2011
- 2012 – Award by the Faculty of Arts Students Association, University of Lagos, "For her immense contribution to the intellectual development of Nigerian students".
- Award by the English Students' Association of Redeemer's University (ESARUN), March 2012: "In recognition of her Outstanding Contribution to the Academic Development of Students and the Society as a whole" – 2012
- 2012 – Awarded the Fellowship of the Nigerian Academy of Letters (FNAL).
- Roses and Bullets was runner-up (one of three books) for the Wole Soyinka Prize for Literature in Africa. 402 books were submitted for the competition, from 26 African countries – 2012
- 2012 – Given a chieftaincy title – Ugonwanyi Edemede Ndi-Igbo – by Eze Nwabueze Ohazulike (OON) Eze Mkpume II (Omereoha) Eze Ndi-Igbo Lagos State, in recognition of her achievements in the fields of writing and research. The title means "Queen of Letters of Igboland".
- 2012 – One of the 50 Nigerian writers profiled in Nigerian Literature, A Coat of Many Colours, edited by Koko Kalango, a publication Of Rainbow Book Club (organizers of The Garden City Literary Festival, Port Harcourt) in partnership with Rivers State Government.
- 2012 – Award of Excellence from the Igbo Students and Alumni Congress Worldwide.
- 2013 – Award from Greensprings School, Lekki, Lagos, in "Recognition of her Outstanding Contribution to Literacy".
- Presented an award (along with five others) by Peter Obi, Anambra State Governor, on 13 July 2013, in Awka: "In recognition of her Literary Achievement as the first Anambra State citizen to win the NLNG's The Nigeria Prize for Literature." The Award was one million naira (N1,000,000.00).
- 2014 – Awarded the Fellowship of the English Scholars Association of Nigeria (FESAN).
- Recipient of Gold Award for Excellence from Uga Improvement Union (UIU) on 26 December 2016, "for your contribution to the educational, economic and social development of Uga Town and for your achievements in research and writing."
- Presented an Award of Recognition by the 2017 Creative Class of Department of Language & Literature, Nnamdi Azikiwe University, Awka, for Contribution Towards the Development of Creativity, 24 February 2017.
- Awarded the Fellowship of the Association of Nigerian Authors (FANA) on 30 October 2017.
- "Award of Excellence presented to Prof. Akachi Adimora-Ezeigbo in recognition of her Outstanding Service to Humanity" by the Faculty of Humanities, Federal University Ndufu-Alike, Ikwo (FUNAI), 9 November 2017.
- Special Award as the Highest Ranked Nigerian Participant at the Igbo Studies Association (USA) at Dominican University, River Forest, Chicago, IL, 11 May 2019.
- Won the 1st Prize in the Staff Short Story category (Maiden Edition) in the Creative Writing Competition at Alex Ekwueme Federal University Ndufu-Alike, Ikwo, 25 July 2019.
- Won second prize in the Staff Poetry category (Maiden Edition) in the Creative Writing Competition at Alex Ekwueme Federal University Ndufu-Alike, Ikwo, 25 July 2019.
- 2019 – Poetry collection Mixed Legacies is the First Runner Up for the ANA Poetry Prize 2019 out of the three shortlisted.
- Received an Award in Recognition of her contribution and as a pioneer member towards the development of Anambra AEFUNAI on 8 December 2019.
- Won the 1st Prize in the Staff Short Story category (Second Edition) in the Creative Writing Competition 2, at Alex Ekwueme Federal University Ndufu-Alike, Ikwo, 13 December 2019.
- Won 3rd Prize in the Staff Poetry category (Second Edition) in the Creative Writing Competition 2, at Alex Ekwueme Federal University Ndufu-Alike, Ikwo, 13 December 2019.
- Short story "The President's Change Agent" won the African Literature Association (ALA) USA Best Short Story Award in May 2020.
- Won the First Prize in the 2021 Haiku Competition organized by the International Forum for the Literature and Culture of Peace (IFLAC).
- "Award of Excellence presented to Prof. Akachi Ezeigbo by Excellence Club, Alex Ekwueme Federal University Ndufu-Alike (AE-FUNAI) for Being an Excellent Mother, Mentor and Role Model to Us". 10 February 2022.

== Community service ==
She has served her community, Uga, both at home and in Lagos in many capacities. She was a member of the Uga Post Office building Committee in the 1980s, and a member of the Ada Uga Association – an association of the Daughters of Uga. In the early 1980s, she served as Assistant Secretary of Uga Improvement Union (Women's Wing). She was elected First Vice President of the same union and served from 1991 to 1993.
She was First Vice President of Umuoru Community Union (Women's Wing) from 1996 to 1999. Ezeigbo was one of the members who drafted the constitutions of these two women associations. She is a representative of U.I.U. (Women's Wing) in Aguata Progressive Union (APU), Lagos, as well as the Chairperson of the Education Committee of Aguata Progressive Union, Lagos.
