= Hyginus Ekwuazi =

Professor Hyginus Ekwuazi was a former Acting Head of the Department of Theatre Arts in the Faculty of Arts at the University of Ibadan, Nigeria. He was also Director General of the Nigerian Film Corporation.

Ekwuazi currently acts as a jury in several awards competitions and festivals, including the Africa Movie Academy Awards, and is an adjunct lecturer at the School of Media and Communication at Pan-Atlantic University in Lagos, Nigeria.
