= Cheluchi Onyemelukwe =

Nigerian academic and author

professor Cheluchi Onyemelukwe
- Born: Cheluchi Onyemelukwe-Onuobia
- Citizenship: Nigerian
- Occupations: Academic; Writer; Lawyer
- Years active: 2016–present
- Known for: Health law
- Notable work: The Son of the House

Cheluchi Onyemelukwe is a Nigerian–Canadian author and academic. She is best known for her 2019 family saga novel The Son of the House which she won the Nigeria Prize for Literature awards for in 2021. She is also a Professor of Law at Babcock University, where she served formerly as an assistant professor. In 2019, she won the award for the best international fiction book at the Sharjah International Book Fair. In 2021, she won the SprinNG women authors prize. Her novel was also nominated for the Giller Prize in 2021.

== Early life and career ==
Onyemelukwe is Nigerian. She attended Dalhousie University in Nova Scotia, Canada, for her Doctor of Juridical Science, and further more at the University of Nigeria, where she obtained her first degree in Law. In 2017, she published Health Research Governance in Africa, which was published by Routledge Publishing. In 2019, she published The Son of the House, a family saga that has been translated in several languages and has also received critical acclaim. She is also a Professor of Law in Babcock University.

== Bibliography ==
- Health Research Governance in Africa (2017)
- The Son of the House (2019)
