= Abubakar Adam Ibrahim =

Nigerian writer and journalist

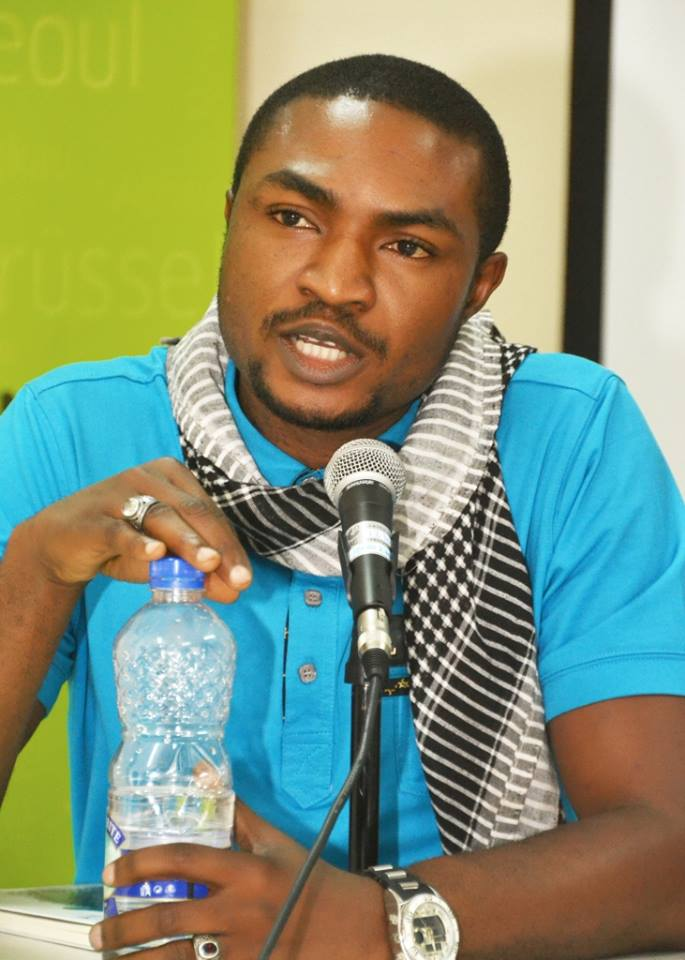
- Abubakar Adam Ibrahim
- Born: Jos, Nigeria
- Education: University of Jos
- Occupations: Writer, journalist
- Notable work: Season of Crimson Blossoms
- Awards: Nigeria Prize for Literature (2016)

Abubakar Adam Ibrahim is a Nigerian writer and journalist. He was described by German broadcaster Deutsche Welle as a northern Nigerian "literary provocateur" amidst the international acclaim his award-winning novel Season of Crimson Blossoms received in 2016.

== Career ==
Abubakar Adam Ibrahim was born in Jos, North-Central Nigeria, and holds a BA degree in Mass Communication from the University of Jos.

His debut short-story collection The Whispering Trees was longlisted for the inaugural Etisalat Prize for Literature in 2014, with the title story shortlisted for the Caine Prize for African Writing. The collection was re-published by Cassava Republic Press for international distribution in 2020 and a French translation was published in 2022.

In 2014 he was selected for the Africa39 list of writers aged under 40 with potential and talent to define future trends in African literature, and was included in the anthology Africa39: New Writing from Africa South of the Sahara (ed. Ellah Allfrey). He was a mentor on the 2013 Writivism programme and judged the Writivism Short Story Prize in 2014. He was chair of judges for the 2016 Etisalat Flash Fiction Prize.

Ibrahim has won the BBC African Performance Prize and the ANA Plateau/Amatu Braide Prize for Prose. He is a Gabriel Garcia Marquez Fellow (2013), a Civitella Ranieri Fellow (2015) and a 2018 Art OMI Fellow. In 2016, Ibrahim was the recipient of the Goethe-Institut & Sylt Foundation African Writer's Residency Award and in March 2020 he was a Dora Maar Fellow.

His first novel, Season of Crimson Blossoms, was published in 2015 by Parrésia Publishers in Nigeria and by Cassava Republic Press in the UK (2016). It was translated into French by Marc Amfreville, published by L'Editions de l'Observatoire in 2018 and nominated for the Prix Femina Étranger. The German translation was published by Residenz Verlag in 2019. Season of Crimson Blossoms was shortlisted in September 2016 for the Nigeria Prize for Literature, Africa's largest literary prize. It was announced on 12 October 2016 that Ibrahim was the winner of the $100,000 prize.

His second short story collection, Dreams and Assorted Nightmares was published by Masobe Books in 2020.

His short story A Love Like This, narrated by Georgina Elizabeth Okon, Nene Nwoko and Ike Amadi, was published as an Audible Original Story in 2021.

In 2024, Abubakar's second novel,When We Were Fireflies, published by Masobe Books in 2023, was shortlisted for the Dublin Literary Award. In July 2025, the book made the longlist of the Nigeria Prize for Literature (NLNG).

Ibrahim worked at the Daily Trust newspaper for over a decade in a variety of roles, latterly as Features Editor, before leaving to pursue postgraduate studies. He continues to write a weekly column entitled 'Line of Sight'. Ibrahim's reporting from North-East Nigeria has won particular critical acclaim. In May 2018, he was announced as the winner of the Michael Elliot Award for Excellence in African Storytelling, awarded by the International Center for Journalists, for his report "All That Was Familiar", published in Granta magazine in May 2017. Ibrahim was a 2018 Ochberg Fellow at the Dart Center for Journalism and Trauma at Columbia University's Graduate School of Journalism.

He has spoken at numerous events, conferences and festivals, including the Hay Festival, Edinburgh International Book Festival, the British Library, Jaipur Literature Festival, PEN World Voices and at the Library of Congress.

He is currently attending grad school in the U.S. at University of Iowa and lives in Iowa City, Iowa

== Publications ==
- "Night Calls" in Daughters of Eve and Other New Short Stories from Nigeria (CCC Press, 2010)
- "Echoes of Mirth" in Africa39: New Writing from Africa South of the Sahara (London: Bloomsbury Publishing, 2014)
- The Whispering Trees (Parrésia Publishers, 2012; ISBN 978-9789237258)
- Painted Love in Valentine's Day Anthology 2015 (Ankara Press, 2015)
- Season of Crimson Blossoms (Nigeria: Parrésia Publishers, 2015; UK: Cassava Republic Press, 2016)
- "All That Was Familiar" (Granta, 2017)
- La Saison des fleurs de flamme (Editions de l'Observatoire, 2018)
- Wo Wir Stolpern und Wo Wir Fallen (Residenz Verlag, 2019)
- Dreams and Assorted Nightmares (Masobe Books, 2020)
- A Love Like This (Audible, 2021)
- When We Were Fireflies (Masobe Books and logistics Limited, 2023)
