= Obari Gomba =

Nigerian writer and academic

- Citizenship: Nigerian
- Education: University of Iowa
- Occupations: Lecturer, writer and playwright
- Writing career
- Notable work: Grit
- Notable awards: ANA Poetry Prize, Nigeria Prize for Literature

Obari Gomba is a Nigerian writer and a playwright. In 2023, he won the Nigeria Prize for Literature for his work Grit.

== Career ==
Gomba is an associate dean of Humanities and teaches Literary and Creative Writing at the University of Port Harcourt. He won the ANA Poetry Prize in 2017 and 2018 was an Honorary Fellow in Writing at the University of Iowa.

Gomba's work had been shortlisted five times since 2013 for the Nigeria Prize for Literature prior to winning it in 2023 for his play Grit, which Lindsay Barrett described as "a cautionary tale in which the reader or the onlooker is being alerted to the resilience and determined existence of GRIT as a quality of life. ... a wholesome commentary on Nigeria's contemporary political circumstance."
