= Ahmed Yerima =

Nigerian playwright and academic (born 1957)

- Born: Ahmed Parker Yerima; 8 May 1957 (age 69); Lagos, British Nigeria
- Education: St. Bernadette's Private School, Abeokuta; Baptist Academy, Lagos
- Alma mater: University of Ife (Diploma, BA); University College Cardiff (PGD); Royal Holloway, University of London (PhD)
- Occupations: Playwright, Theatre director, Academic, Cultural administrator
- Employer: Redeemer's University
- Writing career
- Language: English
- Years active: 1980–present
- Genre: Drama
- Subjects: History, politics, culture, leadership, identity
- Notable works: Hard Ground; Little Drops; Attahiru; The Trials of Oba Ovonramwen; The Sisters; Ameh Oboni the Great
- Notable awards: Nigeria Prize for Literature (2006)

Ahmed Parker Yerima (born 8 May 1957) is a Nigerian academic, professor playwright and theater director. He was director-general of the Nigerian National Theatre, and has previously served as director of the National Troupe. He is a professor of Theater and Performing Arts and has been dean of the College of Humanities at Redeemer's University since 2013. Currently, he is the deputy vice-chancellor of Redeemer's University.

== Early life and education ==
Ahmed Parker Yerima was born on 8 May 1957 in Lagos, Nigeria. He received his primary education at St. Bernadette's Private School, Abeokuta, before attending Baptist Academy in Obanikoro, Lagos, where he obtained both the West African School Certificate and Higher School Certificate.

Yerima studied Dramatic Arts at the University of Ife (now Obafemi Awolowo University), earning both a Diploma and a Bachelor of Arts (Honours) degree between 1977 and 1981.

In 1982, he proceeded to University College Cardiff in the United Kingdom, where he obtained a postgraduate diploma in Playwriting and Acting. He later undertook further studies in theatre and performance, eventually earning a doctoral degree in theatre-related studies from Royal Holloway, University of London.

== Works ==
Though Yerima wrote in different genres of literature, most of his works are historical plays. Prominent among these are: The Trials of Oba Ovonramwen, Attahiru, Ameh Oboni the Great, The Angel, The Twist, Uncle Venyil, The Bishop and the Soul, The Wives, The Mirror Cracks, The Lottery Ticket, Kaffir's Last Game, The Sisters, Mojagbe, Little Drops, Heart of Stone, Yemoja, Orisa Ibeji, Otaelo, and Hard Ground 'Sacred mutter’. His use of proverbs in three of his plays has been described and analysed by Taiwo Oluwaseun Ehineni.

== Themes and style ==
Ahmed Yerima's plays are known for their engagement with history, politics, culture, religion, and questions of leadership in African societies. Scholars have noted that his dramatic works frequently draw upon historical events and prominent figures to examine contemporary social and political issues.

A recurring feature of Yerima's dramaturgy is the blending of historical reconstruction with imaginative interpretation. His plays often revisit significant moments in Nigerian and African history while exploring themes of power, identity, justice, and cultural memory.

Critics have also highlighted Yerima's use of indigenous performance traditions, symbolism, music, and ritual elements, which contribute to a theatrical style rooted in African cultural experiences while engaging with modern dramatic techniques.

== Theatre administration ==
Beyond his work as a playwright and academic, Yerima played a significant role in the administration of theatre and cultural institutions in Nigeria. He served as Director-General of the National Theatre, where he oversaw programmes aimed at promoting dramatic arts and cultural development.

His tenure in cultural administration has been cited by scholars and commentators as an important extension of his contribution to Nigerian theatre, complementing his work as a dramatist, director, and educator.

== Critical reception ==
Yerima's plays have attracted extensive scholarly attention within African literary and theatre studies. Critics have praised his ability to reinterpret historical narratives and cultural traditions in ways that address contemporary political and social concerns.

Several scholars have identified him as one of the leading voices in post-independence Nigerian drama, particularly for his contributions to historical theatre and his sustained engagement with questions of governance, identity, and national memory.

== Legacy ==
Ahmed Yerima is regarded as one of the most prolific and influential Nigerian playwrights of his generation. His plays have been widely studied in universities and have contributed significantly to discussions of history, politics, and culture in African theatre.

His work has influenced a generation of playwrights, theatre practitioners, and scholars, while his contributions to theatre administration have helped shape the development of performing arts institutions in Nigeria.

== Honours and recognition ==
Yerima has received recognition for his contributions to Nigerian theatre, dramatic literature, cultural administration, and theatre education. His plays have been staged and studied extensively within Nigeria and internationally.
