= Association of Nigerian Authors =

Organization promoting Nigerian literature

- Association of Nigerian Authors
- Area served in green
- Abbreviation: ANA
- Founded: 27 June 1981; 45 years ago
- Founder: Chinua Achebe
- Legal status: Active
- Purpose: To nurture and encourage literature in Nigeria
- Headquarters: Mamman Vatsa Writers' Village, Mpape
- Location: Abuja, Nigeria
- Origins: Nsukka, Nigeria
- Region served: Nigeria
- Official languages: English
- Owner: Nigerian Government
- General Secretary: Dame Joan Oji Ph.D
- President: Dr. Usman Oladipo Akanbi
- Vice-president: Prof. Obari Gomba
- Key people: Mu'azu Babangida Aliyu (Patron)
- Main organ: Ministry of Education
- Parent organization: Nigerian Government
- Award: Nigeria Prize for Literature
- Website: Official website

The Association of Nigerian Authors (ANA) is a non-profit organization that promotes Nigerian literature. It represents Nigerian creative writers at home and abroad. It was founded in 1981 by Nigerian novelist Chinua Achebe as its president.

Former Niger State Governor Mu'azu Babangida Aliyu (2007-2011) was a supporter of the association. In January 2008, he said to a delegation from the Association of Nigerian Authors, Niger State, "I think Niger State will be the most published state in 2008. We want to publish you; we shall publish you..." The state was to publish at least twenty titles in 2008 alone. Speaking in October 2009 at a convention of the Association of Nigerian Authors, Aliyu said that more than 90 per cent of Nigerian politicians have criminal intentions, spending huge amounts to gain office for their own benefit rather than to serve the public.

== History ==
The organization was founded on 27 June 1981, ten years after the Nigerian Civil War, at a conference at the University of Nigeria, Nsukka. The conference was attended by two Kenyan writers, Ngũgĩ wa Thiong'o and Gacheche Wauringi. Afterwards, the organization was registered by the Corporate Affairs Commission of Nigeria in accordance with the now 1990 vide Companies and Allied Matters Act no 1.

ANA's founding members include Kole Omotoso, Mabel Segun, Ernest Emenyonu, Labo Yari, Femi Osofisan, current Chairman, ANA Board of Trustees, J. P. Clark, Niyi Osundare, Jerry Agada and T. M. Aluko.

== Prizes it has sponsored ==
In 2004, the ANA awarded the following prizes:

- ANA/Atiku Abubakar Prize for Children Literature — Sola Alamutu and Dawodu Peju: Cate Saves the Ikopi Rainforest (winner); Lawal–Solarin, Tunde: Lanre and the Queen of the Stream; Olajire Olanlokun: Children Poetry for Pleasure.
- ANA/NDDC Drama Prize (In honour of J. P. Clark) — Yahaya Dangana: The Royal Chambers (winner); Chetachukwu Isaacs-Iroegbu: Ezewanyi; Leke Ogunfeyimi: Sacrifice the King.
- ANA/NDDC Prize (In honour of Gabriel Okara) — Ohaeto Ezenwa: Chants of a Minstrel (winner); Emeka Agbayi: Stars Die; Segun Akinlolu: King’s Messenger.
- ANA/NDDC Prose Prize (In memory of Ken Saro-Wiwa) — Arthur-Worey: Fola: The Diaries of Mr Michael (winner); Philip Begho: Jelly Baby; Brisibe-Dorgu: Gesiere: Love So Pure.
- ANA/Spectrum Prize — Tayo Olafioye: Tomorrow Left Us Yesterday (winner); Ifeoma Chinwuba: Merchants of Flesh; Toni Kan: Ballads of Rage.
- ANA/Cadbury Prize — Simbo Olorunfemi: Eko Ree (winner); Nnadi Amu: Pilgrim’s Passage; Joe Ushie: Hill Songs.
- ANA/NDDC Flora Nwapa Prize for Women Writing — Njere Chydy: Ordinary Women. (The judges noted that there was no superlative submission for the category, hence, no entry is worthy of mention.)
- ANA Literary Journalist, 2004 — Ohai Chuks (Daily Independent, winner); Sumaila Umaisha (New Nigerian, winner).
