= Nigerian literature =

Nigerian literature is a literary writing in Nigeria often by her citizens. It encompasses writers in a number of languages spoken in Nigeria including Igbo, Urhobo, Yoruba, Hausa and Nupe.

Things Fall Apart (1958) by Chinua Achebe is one of the milestones in African literature. Other post-colonial authors have won numerous accolades, including the Nobel Prize in Literature, awarded to Wole Soyinka in 1986, and the Booker Prize, awarded to Ben Okri in 1991 for The Famished Road. Nigerians are also well represented among recipients of the Caine Prize and Wole Soyinka Prize for Literature in Africa.

== Nigerian literature in English ==
Nigerian literature is predominantly English-language. Literature in the national languages Yoruba, Igbo and Hausa plays only a minor role. Most of the important English-language authors in West Africa come from Nigeria.

=== Under British rule ===
Among the first modern Nigerian authors was Amos Tutuola. In his magnum opus The Palm-Wine Drinkard (1952) the author follows a man befuddled by palm wine in a fairy-tale atmosphere that leads him to the city of the dead. There he discovers a magical world populated by ghosts, demons and supernatural beings. The book contradicted all realistic narrative conventions and was written in flawed English. For this very reason, the book later became stylistic and highly regarded, although it was criticised at the time for maligning Nigerians as barbaric, perpetually drunken people and provoking racist fantasies.

In 1957, Black Orpheus magazine became the main forum for many Nigerian poets and writers.

=== Independence ===
A number of writers, members of the Mbari Club of Prof. Ulli Beier, became popular in the immediate aftermath of independence.

The Arts Theatre of the University of Ibadan developed into a touring theatre from 1961, but mostly performed plays by European authors. Thus, as a critical reaction to the emerging alienation of theatre from everyday African life in Ibadan, the Mbari Club emerged as a literary centre for African literary figures. Playwright John Pepper Clark staged his first play Song of a Goat here in 1962, a synthesis of forms of ancient theatre and a theme always relevant in Africa - fertility and motherhood - for the European-educated young generation. In 1966, he documented the festival of a hero of the Ijaw people, which is celebrated every 25 years in the Niger Delta, in the original language in his drama Ozidi, adapted it dramatically and translated it into English. He turned the folkloric symbolism into the psychoanalytical.

The only representative of négritude in Nigeria was considered to be the essayist and literary scholar Abiola Irele, who became the director of the journal Black Orpheus in 1968. He criticised the overemphasis on ideological differences between the English- and French-speaking writers of Africa.

As early as the 1950s, popular metropolitan literature based on the American model emerged in Nigeria, published in booklets distributed in the market, the so-called Onitsha market literature, of which Cyprian Ekwensi was probably the most important representative. Ekwensi, the son of an African storyteller, wrote hundreds of short stories as well as 35 novels and children's books. His best-known work is Jagua Nana (1961), a description of the life of an ageing sex worker that is not free of stereotypes.

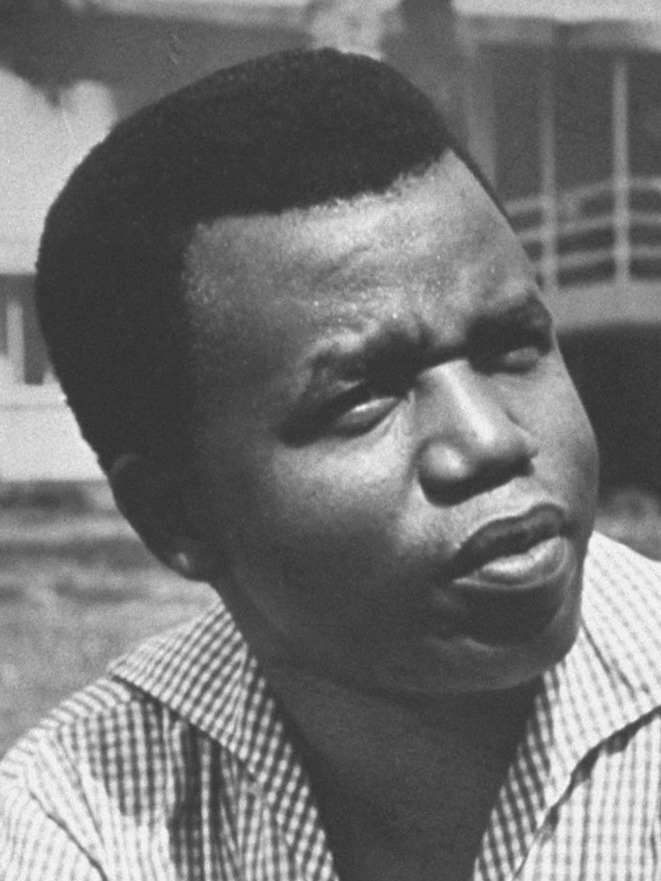
Chinua Achebe (1966)

Considered the most important founding figure of English-language literature in West Africa, Chinua Achebe, winner of the 2002 Peace Prize of the German Book Trade, made his debut as a novelist and poet with Things Fall Apart (1958), which, along with No Longer at Ease (1960), is his magnum opus. His novels place African heroes at the crossroads of two worlds: a Western world with an abstract rationality devoid of justice and an Africa whose outmoded traditional values handicap its subjects for the new age. He is one of the best-known English-language African authors. That is why he has been considered for the Nobel Prize in Literature several times. Things Fall Apart describes an Africa before the arrival of Europeans and which carries old values that Achebe wants to emphasise. The book reached a circulation of 400,000 copies in 1969 and three million copies in 1987. It has been translated into 45 languages. In Anthills of the Savannah (1987), he describes an Africa gripped by corruption and the false position of intellectuals, where women are the future. Achebe was awarded the Man Booker International prize in recognition of his entire career as a novelist and author in 2007. In awarding the prize, Nadine Gordimer referred to Achebe as "the father of modern African literature". In the early years of the new millennium, some Nigerian writers have also repackaged the folk tales of the past to suggest relevance to modern circumstance such as the reimagining of African trickster stories around the tortoise avatar.

=== After the Biafra war ===
Flora Nwapa began her career as a writer while teaching at Queen's School in Enugu. Two of her novels, Efuru (1966) and Idu (1970), are set in her native village and acquaint readers with local customs. They depict the workings of the patriarchal and age-grouped society that enables the resolution of problems and conflicts, and the role of the kola nut in all family ceremonies. They address the themes that will run throughout their work: the role of children in the family, the consequences of female infertility, the position of women in Nigerian society and their vital need for economic independence. Never again (1975) recalls the terrible years of the Biafra war and the devastating effects of propaganda that banned all critical thinking. In 1966, when 25 titles had already appeared in the Heinemann African Writers Series, Flora Nwapa became the first woman to be included in the series. It was to take another 30 titles before another woman appeared in the series.

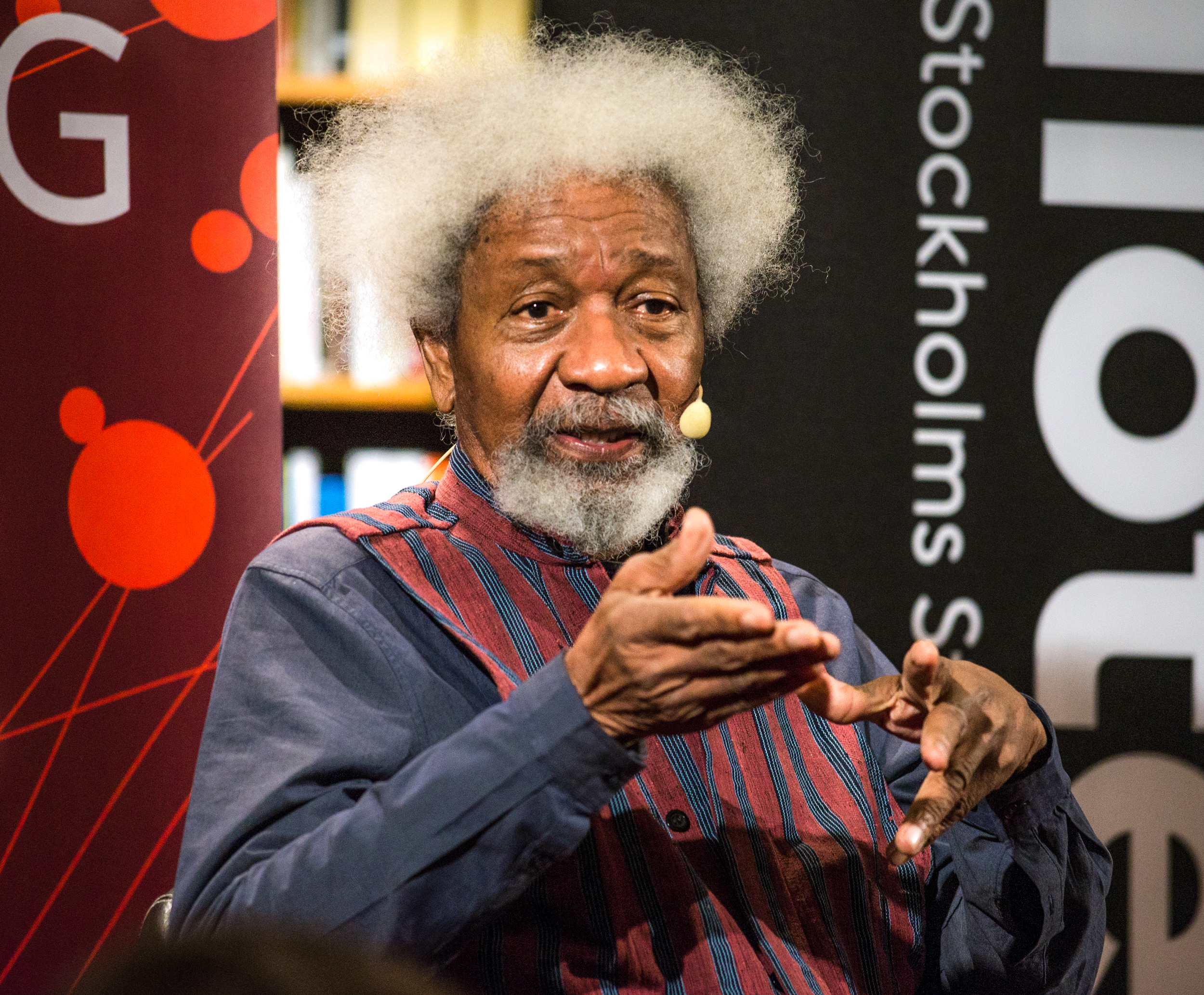
Wole Soyinka

Wole Soyinka is a screenwriter and director. He was awarded the Nobel Prize for Literature in 1986 and is the first black author to be honoured in this way. (Note: Previously, winners were Claude Simon and Albert Camus, born in French Madagascar and French-held Algeria.) Soyinka was awarded the prize for writing "...in a wide cultural perspective and with poetic overtones fashions the drama of existence". A prolific and versatile artist, he has written numerous plays, as well as autobiographical stories, poetry collections and short stories, novels, and political and literary essays. Known for the richness of his poetic imagery and the complexity of his thought, he counts among his masterpieces the anti-colonialist tragedy Death and the King's Horseman (1975).

Buchi Emecheta, a Nigerian living in London, dealt with themes such as motherhood, social contrasts and independence and freedom for women. The tragic-romantic novel The Bride Price (1976) reflects the social conventions in Nigeria around 1970, namely those of arranged marriages, bride kidnappings and the bride price mentioned in the title. The heroine Aku-nna finds the husband who returns her feelings through cleverness and courage. However, she does not have much time to enjoy her happiness. Second Class Citizen (1974) follows a Nigerian woman who moves in with her children to live with her husband, who already lives in Britain. She encounters racial resentment and domestic violence before she can realise her dream of a writing career.

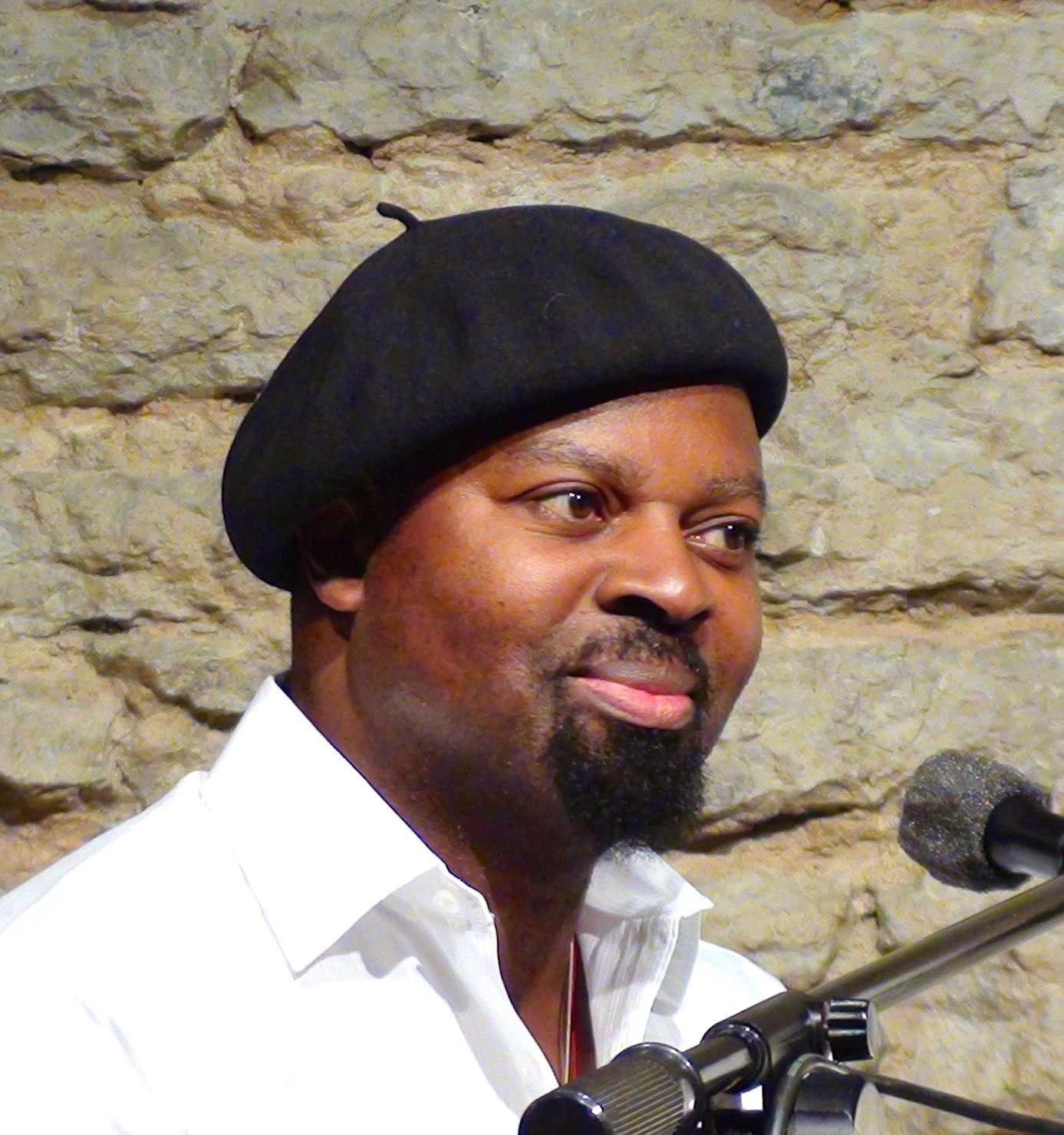
Ben Okri

Ben Okri first wrote short stories about social and political problems, some of which were published in women's magazines and evening newspapers. Okri found success with the publication of his first novel, Flowers and Shadows (1980). From 1983 to 1986, he worked for West Africa Magazine, where he served as editor of the poetry section. In 1991, Okri won the Booker Prize in the fiction category for The Famished Road, a magical surrealist novel about Azaro, a "spirit child".

=== Dealing with dictatorship ===
The main themes of the 1980s and 1990s were the democratisation movement and the critique of military dictatorships. Criticism of the Nigerian military dictatorship cost the novelist, screenwriter and environmental activist Ken Saro-Wiwa his life: he was sentenced to death in 1995 under Sani Abacha's regime. Helon Habila's Oil on Water (2010) dealt with the victims of the military dictatorship and the ongoing oil spill in the Niger Delta.

=== The new millennium ===
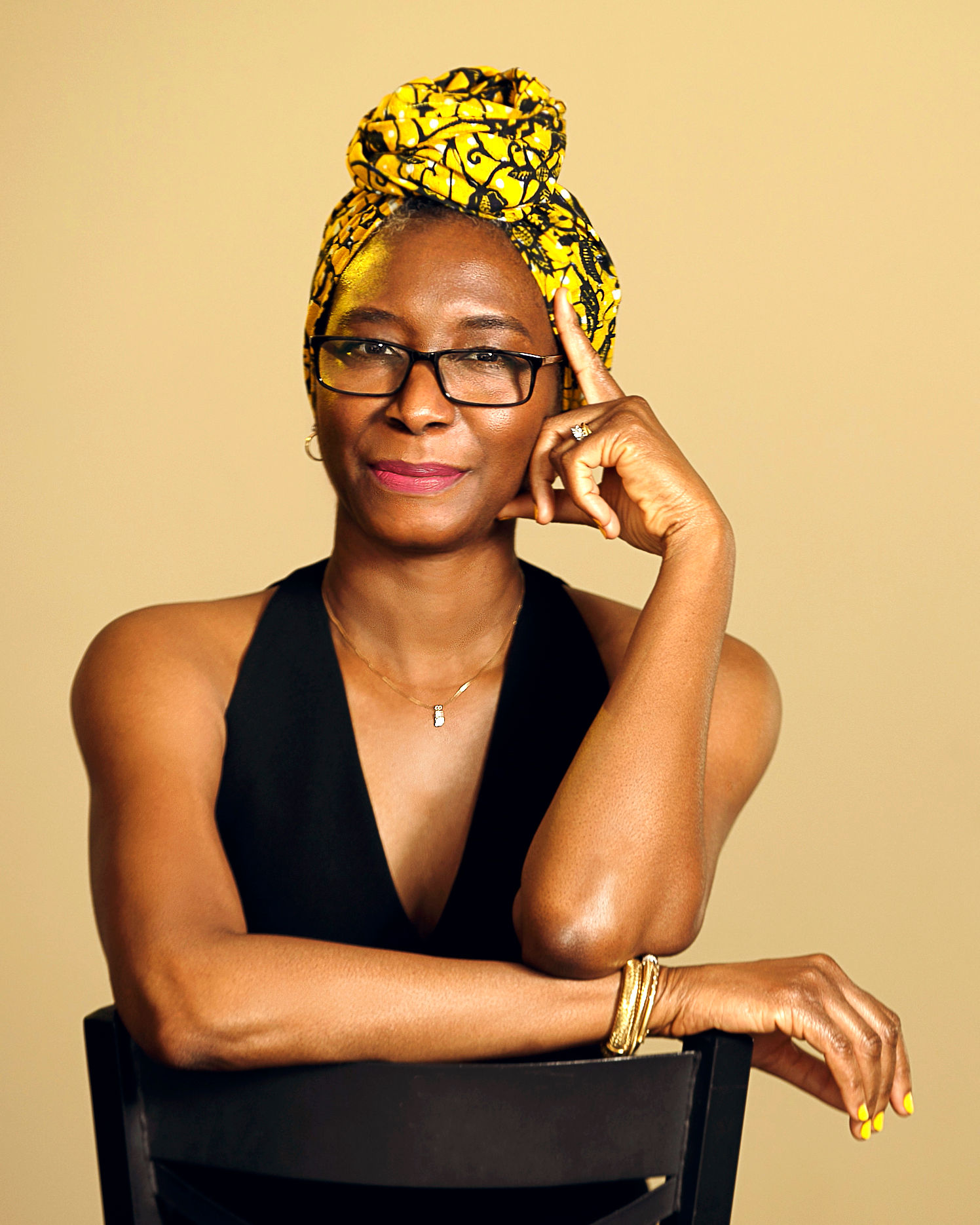
Sefi Atta

Sefi Atta is a writer and playwright. Her Everything Good Will Come (2005) is a bildungsroman that follows the lives of two women. After a series of dramatic events, tensions between different ethnic groups, rebellion against a male-dominated society and societal expectations, the heroine finds shelter and understanding with a group of political activists.

Femi Osofisan uses surrealistic stylistic devices and traditional African forms of expression with an educational purpose in his approximately 60 plays. He often adapted European classics. His themes are the change of traditions, gender and sexual repression. Women of Owu (2004) is a retelling of Euripides' Trojan Women.

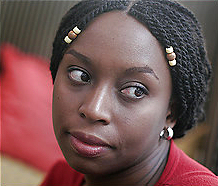
Chimamanda Ngozi Adichie

Chimamanda Ngozi Adichie's literary career took off with the publication in 2003 of Purple Hibiscus, an initiation novel in which a brother and sister finally find their voices again. The critically acclaimed debut novel was nominated for the Baileys Women's Prize for Fiction in 2004 and was named Best Debut in the Commonwealth Writers' Prize in 2005. Her second novel, Half of a Yellow Sun, was published in 2006, set before and during the Biafra war, in which we follow the lives of two sisters separated by war. The book won the 2007 Orange Prize for Fiction as well as the Anisfield-Wolf Book Award. Her third work, the short story collection The Thing Around Your Neck was published in 2009. In 2013, she published her fourth book, the novel Americanah, which tells the story of a young Nigerian woman named Ifemelu who has emigrated to the US and a young man who has emigrated to the UK. Ifemelu faces poverty, discrimination and racism until she becomes a star of the blogosphere. She becomes the "first blogger on race". The novel was selected by The New York Times as one of the "10 Best Books of 2013".

=== After 2010: Social networks, telecommunication and their effect on Nigerian society ===
Post-2010 Nigerian literature focuses on real life in metropolitan Nigeria and the influence of social networks on Nigerian social life.

Among the younger Nigerian authors is Adaobi Tricia Nwaubani, who won the Commonwealth Writers' Prize for the best debut novel with I Do Not Come to You By Chance in 2010. It describes the story of a young academic, Kingsley Ibe, who is unable to find a position yet is expected to care for his retired parents and younger siblings. His wealthy uncle Boniface offers a way out of this dilemma, but demands Kingsley's involvement in his criminal and risky email scam business.

Noo Saro-Wiwa's 2012 account of her journey around Nigeria to reconnect with her homeland, Looking for Transwonderland, documents travel as a way to repair that relationship, which was deeply affected by the trauma of the execution of her father Ken Saro-Wiwa.

Elnathan John's short story Bayan Layi was shortlisted for the Caine Prize in 2013. His short story Flying was shortlisted again in 2015. His first novel Born on a Tuesday was published in 2016 and traces the shaping of adolescents through experiences of violence. He was shortlisted for the NLNG Literary Award, Nigeria's most prestigious literary prize, and shortlisted for the Republic of Consciousness Award in 2017. Together with cartoonist Àlàbá Ònájin, he depicts the daily life of the family of wealthy free church clergyman Akpoborie in the comic Lagos - Life in Suburbia.

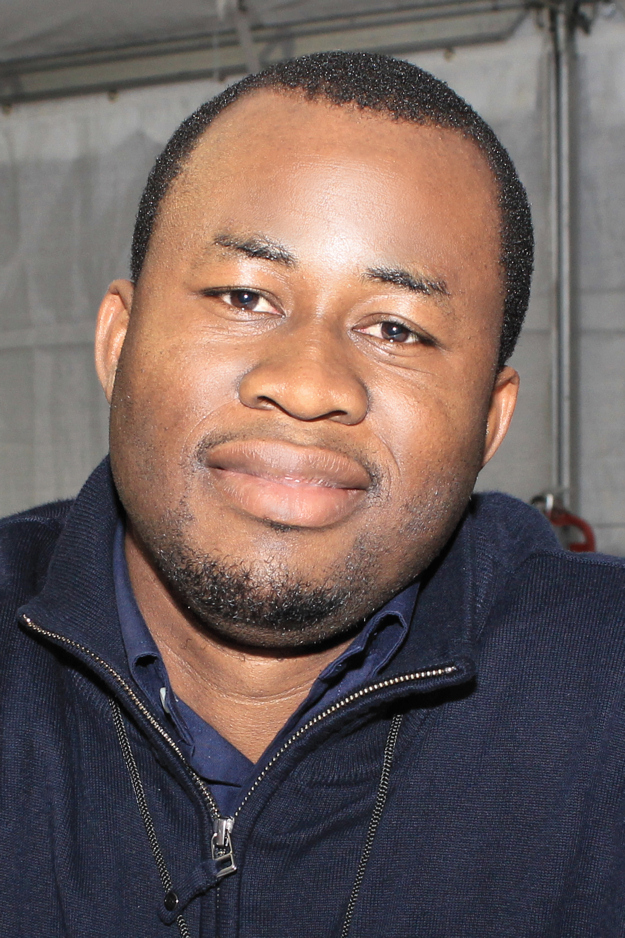
Chigozie Obioma

Chigozie Obioma became known for two successful novels. The Fishermen (2015) is about an ominous prophecy that spells doom for four brothers in the author's hometown. An Orchestra of Minorities (2019), shortlisted for the 2019 Man Booker Prize, describes the fate of a Nigerian chicken farmer who moves to Northern Cyprus to earn the money that will win him the heart of the woman he loves. But he encounters racist resentment in his new home and is cheated out of his savings.

Stephen Buoro received the Booker Prize Foundation Scholarship in 2018 and was named by The Guardian as one of their ten best new novelists of 2023. His debut novel, The Five Sorrowful Mysteries of Andy Africa, was shortlisted for the inaugural Nero Book Awards in the 'Debut Fiction' category and longlisted for the Aspen Words Literary Prize.

Further Nigerian writers include: Daniel O. Fagunwa, Tanure Ojaide, Chris Abani, Ayobami Adebayo, Akwaeke Emezi, Nuzo Onoh, Yemisi Aribisala, A. Igoni Barrett, B.M. Dzukogi, Helen Oyeyemi, Nnedi Okorafor, Uju Obuekwe, Chinelo Okparanta, Sarah Ladipo Manyika, Chika Unigwe, Ogaga Ifowodo, Melekwe Anthony, Gift Foraine Amukoyo, Teju Cole, Niyi Osundare and Oyinkan Braithwaite. A list of "100 Most Influential Nigerian Writers Under 40 (Year 2016)" was published on 28 December 2016 on the Nigerian Writers Awards website.

== Nigerian literature in the Yoruba language ==
The first novel in Yoruba, Itan-Igbesi Aiye Emi Segilola (The Life History of Me) about the life of a prostitute by Isaac B. Thomas, was published in 1929 as a serialised novel in 30 installments in a Lagos newspaper. The realistic book, which reports many details about Lagos in the 1920s, reflects the various language influences and the peculiarities of oral urban speech. In the new editions published as books, the style was "literarised". This was followed by The Forest of a Thousand Daemons (1938) by Daniel Olorumfemi Fagunwa. This magical folkloric adventure novel, full of turgid rhetoric and featuring the main character of the legendary Yoruba hunter Àkàrà-Oògùn, is considered the first substantial book in Yoruba. It has been reprinted many times and was translated into English by Wole Soyinka in 1968. In his five novels in all, two of which deal with pre-colonial society and the others with colonial influences on Yoruba society, both traditional Yoruba values and Christian values are upheld. In his dramas, he uses the alienating self-imagination of the character, emphasising the genealogical anchoring of his characters.

Duro Ladipo, son of an Anglican clergyman, was a playwright who wrote exclusively in Yoruba and adapted ancient myths, fairy tales and stories from Christian, Islamic or Yorubian traditions in his plays, in which he himself acted. Another important playwright of the Yoruba folk theatre (the Yoruba Opera) was Hubert Ogunde, who also wrote these plays, which were always linked with music, in English. The politician Afolabi Olabimtan also wrote novels in Yoruba.

A special role in the discovery and promotion of Yoruba literature was played by Oyekan Owomoyela, who taught in the USA and edited anthologies of trickster tales and proverbs.

== Nigerian literature in the Igbo language ==
The Igbo have made a rather minor contribution to Nigerian literature. The first short novel in Igbo was written by Pita (Peter) Nwana in 1933 (Omenuko, 1935). It is a historical narrative about a poor boy who rises to become a wealthy trader and paramount chief, but sells his apprentices as slaves to compensate himself for losses of goods suffered, and still becomes impoverished. Initially, efforts to promote literature in Igbo remained largely unsuccessful for a long time, especially since Chinua Achebe achieved his major book success in English with Things Fall Apart in 1958. Achebe also refused to use standard Igbo. It was not until the 1970s that some novelists emerged, such as Tony Ubesie, who died young in 1993.

== Literature of Northern Nigeria ==
Northern Nigerian written literature can be divided into 4 main periods. The first is the 14 Kingdoms Period (10th-19th century), the second is the Sokoto period (19th-20th century), the third is the Colonial Period (20th century), and the fourth is the Post-Independence period (20th century to present).

During the 14 Kingdoms (until 1804) many authors produced books that dealt with theology, history, biography, mathematics, language, writing, documentaries, geography, astronomy, diplomacy and poetry.

Some of the known authors and some of their works

- Ibn Furtu was the Chronicler of Mai Idris Alooma. He produced two historical works: The Book of the Bornu Wars, and The Book of the Kanem Wars, which detail the wars that transformed Bornu from an independent Sultanate into an Empire. These works were produced in 1576 and 1578 respectively.
- Muhammad abd al-Razzaq al-Fallati was a 16th-century Fulbe scholar in Hausaland who wrote K.fi'l-tawhid
- Uthman Ibn Idris of Bornu sent a letter to the Mamluk Sultan of Egypt in 1391-1392. The letter was one of a diplomatic nature, it also contained poetry and an erudite understanding of Islamic law. This letter contains the earliest extant indigenous written poem produced in Nigeria.
- Muhammad al-Maghili wrote On The Obligations of Princes in Kano for Muhammad Rumfa in the 15th century. Al-Maghili was a Berber from North Africa who was born in an area that is now Algeria.
- Muhammad ibn al-Sabbagh was a 17th-century scholar and author from the Katsina Sultanate. He was celebrated during and well after his time, and wrote praise poetry for the Sultan of Bornu's conquest against Kwararafa. He also wrote a poem praising the Sultan of Katsina Muhammad Uban Yari.
- Muhammad ibn Masani was the student of Muhammad ibn al Sabbagh and also a celebrated scholar from Katsina. He also produced works in the Hausa language during the 17th century. He wrote many works, one of them was an anthropological study on the Yoruba people, this work was mentioned by Muhammad Bello who lived some 200 years later in his Infaq'l-Maysuur Azhar al-ruba fi akhbar Yuruba. It was one of the earliest written accounts on the transatlantic slave trade by an indigenous African, which also noted that free Muslim people were taken from all parts of Hausaland and sold to European Christians. He also wrote to a Jurist in Yorubaland explaining how to determine the time for the sunset prayer. His work in Hausa was a poem he had heard from a woman in Katsina, called Wakar Yakin Badara. So far it is known that he had authored ten books.
- Abdullahi Suka was a 17th-century Kano scholar of Fulbe ancestry who is said to have written the oldest extant literature in Hausa with his work Riwayar Annabi Musa. He also authored Al-Atiya li'l muti (translated: The Gift Of The Donor) and many others. His description reads: "he was a city of learning, he was the greatest mallam of his time".
- Salih ibn Isaq wrote an account of Birnin Garzargamu in 1658, describing the capital city of Bornu during the reign of Mai Ali ibn Al Hajj Umar.
- Sheikh Jibril ibn Umar was an 18th-century scholar and author, in his work Shifa al-Ghalil he attacked Muslims who mixed indigenous beliefs with Islam. Admixture of Animists practices and Islam was one of the main reasons given for the Jihad of Uthman dan Fodio during the 19th Century.

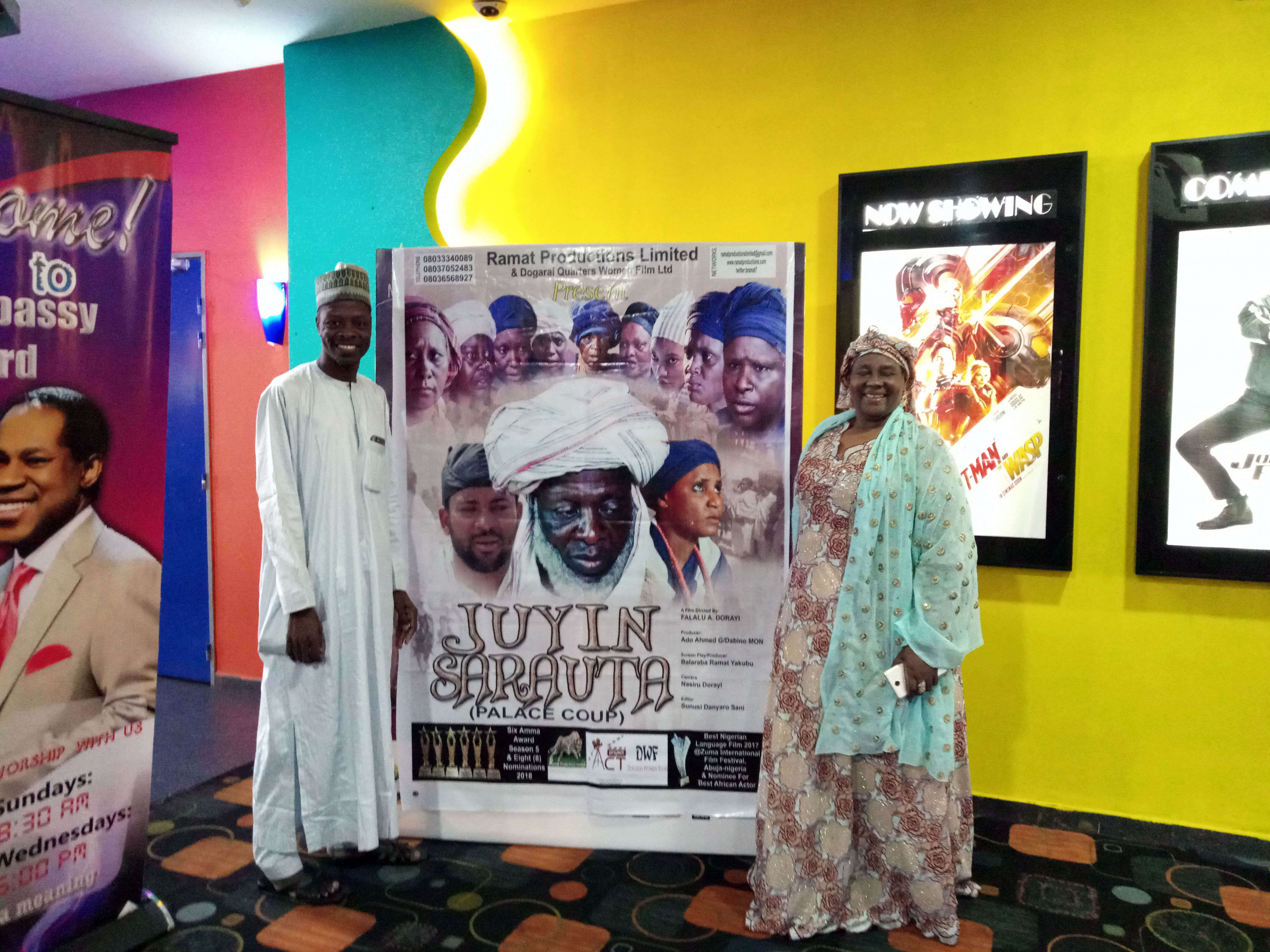
Balaraba Ramat Yakubu (on the right)

Their literature dates back to Usman dan Fodio and the Sokoto Caliphate, i.e. the late 18th century. The early works were written in Ajami, a variant of Arabic script. The journalist and poet Abubakar Imam published the first Hausa newspaper, Gaskiya Ta Fi Kwabo, in Zaria from 1941. Many modern novels written in Hausa are by women (so-called Kano Market Literature), such as the more than 30 books by Hafsat Abdul Waheed, the love novels by Balaraba Ramat Yakubu or the works of Lubabah Ya'u.

== Censorship / intimidation of authors ==
Freedom of expression is protected by the Nigerian Constitution (Section 39 - 1) of 1999, with which Nigeria became a democracy. There is no government controlled institution either, which would control any printed media. 100 independent newspapers exist in Nigeria. However, in 2021 freelance reporter Luka Binniyat spent 91 days in jail for criticizing a State Commissioner, being accused of "cyberstalking". In May 2022, reporter Prince Olamilekan Hammed was arrested after having exposed alleged criminal activities of the Ogun State governor Dapo Abiodun in the United States.

The National Film and Video Censors Board controls non-print media and has stopped the publication of a few films in 2002, due to displaying "obscene acts among young women".

The Reporters without Borders World Press Freedom Index ranked Nigeria 115th out of 180 countries in 2020. This is better than Morocco (133) or Turkey (154), but worse than other West African countries such as Ivory Coast (68) or Ghana (30).

== See also ==
- Hausa literature
- Yoruba literature
- Igbo literature
- Efik literature
- Edo literature
- List of Nigerian writers
- Third Generation of Nigerian writers
- List of libraries in Nigeria
