= Nwapa =

- Gender: Unisex
- Language: Igbo

Origin
- Origin: Igbo
- Meaning: Child of peace or peaceful child
- Region of origin: Igboland

Nwapa audio is a unisex name and is often used as a surname. It is of Igbo origin. The name means "child of peace" or "peaceful child".

== Notable people with the name ==
- Flora Nwapa, Nigerian writer and publisher
- Alban Nwapa, Swedish musician
