= Phanuel Egejuru =

Nigerian writer and scholar

- Education: University of Minnesota, University of California, Los Angeles (UCLA)
- Occupations: Writer and academic

Phanuel Egejuru is a Nigerian writer and academician, whose areas of focus are composition, short fiction, Black literature and aesthetics, 19th-century British fiction and Victorian England. She is best known for her 1993 novel The Seed Yams Have Been Eaten.

Egejuru studied in Nigeria, Senegal, Ivory Coast and France. She then attended the University of Minnesota, graduating magna cum laude in French. After moving to the University of California, Los Angeles (UCLA), she obtained her MA, MPH and PhD in comparative literature.

She taught at UCLA, and in Tanzania, Nigeria and Rhode Island, before moving to Loyola University in New Orleans, where she is a Professor Emerita.

== Books ==
Egejuru's books include:

- Black Writers, White Audience: A Critical Approach to African Literature (1978)
- Towards African Literary Independence: A Dialogue with Contemporary African Writers (1980)
- Chinua Achebe: Pure and Simple, An Oral Biography (2003)
- Womanbeing and Womanself: Characters in Black Women's Novels (2011)
