= Coconut (novel) =

2007 book

- Author: Kopano Matlwa
- Language: English
- Genre: Fiction
- Published: 2007
- Publisher: Jacana
- Publication place: South Africa
- Pages: 190

Coconut is a 2007 novel by Kopano Matlwa. It tells the story of a young, black girl, and her life in Johannesburg's white suburbs. The book won the Dinaane Debut Fiction Award, and the Wole Soyinka Prize for Literature in Africa.
