= Idu (novel) =

1970 novel by Flora Nwapa

- Author: Flora Nwapa
- Language: English
- Published: 1970, 1989
- Publisher: Heinemann Educational Books
- Publication place: Nigeria
- Media type: Print (hardcover, paperback)
- ISBN: 0435900560

Idu is a 1970 novel and the second novel put out by Nigerian novelist Flora Nwapa. The book's story centers on Idu, a young woman in a Nigerian village whose husband has died, and her efforts to be reunited with him. The novel has been seen as one of Nwapa's more controversial works for its focus on Idu's reliance on her husband.

== Plot ==
The novel is set in a remote African village and follows the protagonist Idu and her husband Adiewere over a number of years. From the beginning of the novel, Nwapa ensures the reader is aware of the wedded bliss between Idu and Adiewere; they are absolutely devoted to each other as husband and wife. Their happiness together is portrayed to be overwhelming. In the African tribe, motherhood is coveted and being a mother is deemed to be far more important than being a devoted wife. Despite their desire for children, Idu and Adiewere remain childless for many years. During this time, Idu and Adiewere build a great business and become prosperous however when Adiewere's brother, Ishiodu is in trouble, they forfeit their wealth to help Ishiodu. As time passes, the pressure from the villagers for Idu and Adiewere to have a child becomes unbearable and Idu weeps that she has brought the curse of childlessness onto her husband. At Idu's beckoning, Adiewere takes a second wife, who he treats as a child rather than a wife. Idu unexpectedly announces she is pregnant and the village rejoices with the couple and bestows many gifts upon the popular couple. Upon becoming aware of Idu's pregnancy, the second wife leaves Adiewere.

Idu's son is born on the day of an eclipse which Idu believes is a bad omen, remembering a dream about having a boy that was so dark she did not dare touch the boy. Idu and Adiewere name their son Ijoma. Idu's sister Anamadi grows to love Ijoma and he spends most of his time with her. Two years pass and Idu is not again pregnant and thus Idu asks her husband to take another wife rather than constantly being berated as being ‘bad’ for denying her husband the privilege of more children.

The reader is then introduced to a second couple, Ojiugo and Amarajeme who also adore each other. Ojiugo is Idu's childhood friend. However, after six years and no children, Ojiugo leaves Amarajeme to live with her husband's friend in order to fulfill her dream of motherhood. Amarajeme is heartbroken and wears black and mourns his wife. Upon hearing the news Ojiugo has born a son, Amarajeme realises he is sterile and to blame for their childlessness and hangs himself. Ojiugo hears of Amarajeme's death and dies that same day from heartbreak for her first beloved husband.

After four years, Idu becomes pregnant for a second time and for a short time, the couple and the village rejoice in the pending birth of their second child. Tragically, Adiewere dies suddenly. After Adiewere's death, Idu does not weep, wear black or scrape her hair as tradition expects. Further, Idu refuses to marry Ishiodu, her husband's brother; Idu is steadfast that she will join Adiewere. Ultimately, Idu rejects life and dies in order to be with her beloved husband.

== Major characters ==
- Idu: Idu is a devoted wife who often has ideals which are a departure from tradition. Idu loves her husband Adiewere so intensely, she is willing to concede to traditions in order to not shame her husband.
- Adiewere: Adiewere is the husband of Idu. He is a doting and devoted husband who, like his wife, is willing to sacrifice his personal ideals to concede to his wife's wishes.
- Ogbenyanu: Ogbenyau is a sister of Idu who bears a child before Idu causing Idu great grief.
- Anamadi: Anamadi is the sister of Idu who comes to love her nephew Ijoma and cares for Ijoma most of the time. Anamadi is the person who finds Idu dead.
- Okeke: Okeke is a business friend of Idu. Okeke showers Idu with gifts when she becomes pregnant.
- Ishiodu: Ishiodu is the only brother of Adiewere. Idu and Adiewere provide funds to clear Ishiodu's debt. After Adiewere dies, the village pressures Idu to marry Ishiodu.
- Ijoma: Ijoma is the male child of Idu and Adiewere. Ijoma is born on the day of an eclipse, considered an omen because of the “two nights”.
- Ojiugo: Ojiugo is Idu's childhood friend. Ojiugo is married to Amarajeme and together they are unable to bear children and Ojiugo eventually marries Obukodi to fulfill her dreams of motherhood.
- Amarajeme: Amarajeme is Ojiugo's first husband and they are desperately in love however Amarajeme is sterile and Ojiugo ultimately leaves him. Upon hearing Ojiugo has born a son, Amarajeme commits suicide. Because he is not ready to hear this kind of news.
- Obukodi: Obukodi is the person whom Ojiugo leaves her beloved husband Amarajeme in order to bear a child.

== Culture ==
The culture showcased in Idu is that of the Igbo people. The book is both representative and unrepresentative of the Igbo culture.

Some criticism includes:

- Idu challenges an Igbo woman's cultural norms by rejecting the idea of male dominance, their role as a wife, and the importance of the child.
- Idu's death acts as a protest against the Igbo traditional custom, levirate.
- Nwapa showcases the ideal Igbo woman within her character, Idu, rather than the average Igbo woman.
- The characters in Idu are at odds with the Igbo reality.

Aspects that are representative of Igbo culture includes:

- The concept that a childless marriage is a failure.
- In “The Igbo Word”, the Chimalum Nwankwo states that one of Idu's core themes is childlessness and the unhappiness it brings.
- Nwapa's use of the Uhamiri. The Uhamiri is an Igbo myth. This myth acts as a plot device in Idu.
- The myth of Uhamiri allows for increased cultural awareness of the Igbo culture. Uhamiri is a symbol of morality and ethical values in the Igbo culture.

== Themes ==
A central theme in Idu, is the tension between traditional customs and divergence from established traditions. Tradition holds that it is women's singular duty to aspire to have children. Tradition holds that the glory of motherhood is far more important than the glory of being a wife. However, this tradition is tested by Idu and Adiewere at times; the couple also accepts tradition as evidenced when Adiewere takes a second wife. The couple appears torn between traditional expectations and independence of new thought.

A second theme in Idu is the double standard and voicelessness of women. Through the relationship of Ojiugo and Amarajeme, it is presumed that Ojiugo is the reason that the couple cannot bear children. However, when Ojiugo bears a child with another man, Amarajeme comes to understand he is sterile, is devastated, and kills himself. Ojiugo dies that same day out of devotion to her first husband, symbolic of exerting her voice and choosing marriage over motherhood.

A final theme in Idu is the emerging strength of women within the African tribe. Idu is portrayed as a heroine, a woman of independent thought who is industrious and self-assertive. Ultimately, upon the death of Adiewere, Idu exerts her ultimate independence, rejects that motherhood is paramount and chooses to die and leaver her son in order to be with her husband.

== Background and publication ==
Published in London by Heinemann Educational Books in 1970, Idu is the second work to be written by Nigerian author Flora Nwapa. Following the release of her first novel Efuru in 1966, Nwapa successfully established herself as one of the most important novelists in Nigeria being one of the first female novelists at the time. As is the case with the rest of her work, Idu was written with the intention of challenging the depiction of women in Nigerian Literature. The book was re-released once again in 1989 by Heinemann Educational Books as the 56th entry to the African Writers Series. The book has not been in publication since then and is not a part of the revamped African Writers Series by Pearson Education.

== Legacy ==
Flora Nwapa's novels and stories take topics like marriage, social responsibility, self-sacrifice, and humanity and then questions the prevalent cultural norms associated with them.

Traditionally, Igbo literature was written from a male perspective, however, Idu is written from a feminine perspective. The female characters in Idu are the ones that are displayed making sacrifices for the “greater good”. Idu forces readers to see the female from a new perspective. The female is shown as a person with brains, feelings, emotions, and desires; they are not merely an object.

Nwapa uses Idu to cast a light on problems within the Igbo community. Through her characters, she stresses the importance of healing their community to allow for a rebirth of their community and for their people.

However, critics assert that Idu also leaves a legacy stating that children are not as important as love. Idu kills herself through starvation after Adiewere dies, even though she was pregnant and had a son. In a world where children come first, Idu sends the message that the love of two people is greater than the love for a child. Idu does challenge her role in the Igbo community but the fact that she is pregnant "problematizes the issue of childlessness".
