= Ishtiyaq =

Ishtiyaq is an Asian masculine given name. Notable people with the name include:

- Ishtiyaq Ahmad Zilli (born 1942), Indian historian
- Ishtiyaq Shukri, South African writer
- Mohammad Ishtiyaq Rayi (born 1979), Nepalese politician
