= Mubanga Kalimamukwento =

Zambian writer (born 1988)

Mubanga Kalimamukwento (born 1988) is a Zambian writer, known for her novel The Mourning Bird, which focuses on Zambia's AIDS crisis, and Obligations to the Wounded, her thematically linked collection of short stories centring the lives of Zambian women and girls. The Mourning Bird was awarded the Dinaane Debut Fiction Award in 2018/2019. In 2024, she became the first African writer to win the Drue Heinz Prize for Literature. In 2025, Obilgations to the Wounded won a Minnesota Book Award in the Novel & Short Story category and was longlisted for the Carol Shields Prize for Fiction, an award focused on women writers.

Obligations to the Wounded was also listed among The 75 best books of 2024 by The Boston Globe, 100 Notable African Books of 2024 by Brittle Paper, a Notable Book From Africa in 2024 by Afrocritik.

In 2025, Mubanga published her debut hybrid collection of poems and essays, Another Mother Does Not Come When Yours Dies, a finalist for the Center for African American Poetry and Poetics (CAAPP) Book Prize 2023.

== Early life and education ==
Mubanga was born in Lusaka, Zambia. She earned her bachelor's degree in Law from Cavendish University Zambia, a master's degree in Law from the University of Minnesota, and a master's degree in Fine Arts from Hamline University. She is currently a PhD student in the department of Gender, Women, and Sexualities Studies at the University of Minnesota.

== Bibliography ==
=== Chapbooks ===
- (2022) unmarked graves

=== Novels ===
- (2019)The Mourning Bird
- (2026) The Shipikisha Club

=== Collections ===
- Obligations to the Wounded
- Another Mother Does Not Come When Yours Dies
