= Harriet Anena =

Ugandan writer and performer

Ber (Harriet) Anena
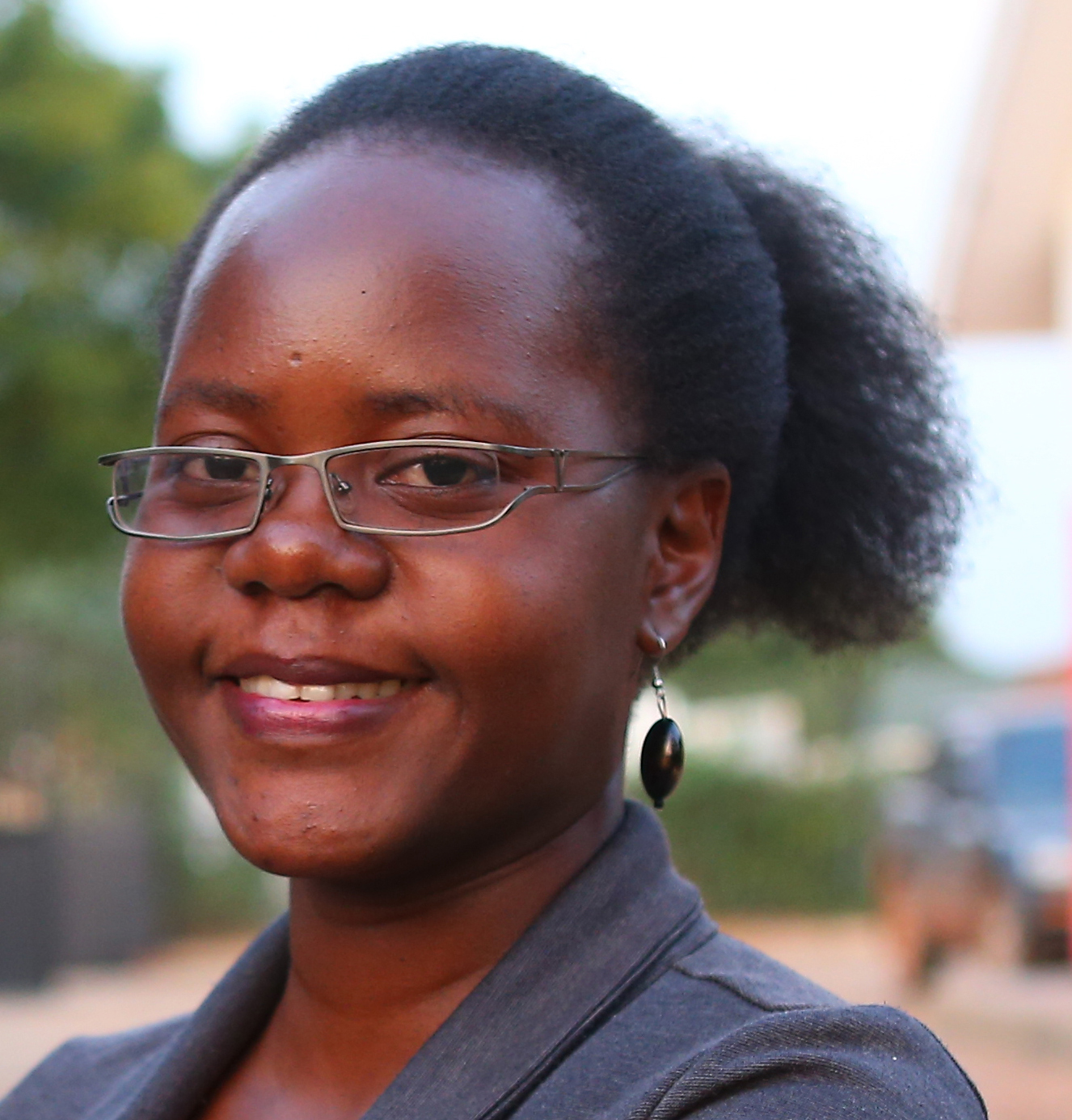
- Born: Harriet Anena; Gulu District, Uganda
- Education: Makerere University (Bachelor of Arts in Mass Communication) (Master of Arts in human rights) Columbia University (MFA Writing, Creative Nonfiction)
- Occupation: Writer
- Writing career
- Genres: Poetry, fiction, nonfiction
- Notable work: A Nation In Labour (2015)
- Notable awards: 2018 Wole Soyinka Prize for Literature in Africa
- Website: beranena.com

Ber Anena born and previously published as Harriet Anena is a Ugandan writer and performer, whose writing includes poetry, nonfiction and fiction. She is the author of a collection of poems, A Nation In Labour, published in 2015, won the 2018 Wole Soyinka Prize for Literature in Africa. The Economist described her poetry performance as "an arresting evocation of love and war".

== Early life and education ==
Anena was born to Acholi parents and raised in the Gulu District of Uganda. She grew up during the two-decade war led by the Lord's Resistance Army rebels, an episode that birthed and influenced her early writing. Anena attended Gulu Public Primary School, Sacred Heart Secondary School, and Gulu Central High School. She graduated with a Bachelor of Mass Communication degree from Makerere University in 2010 and completed a Master of Arts degree in human rights from the same institution in 2018. She is pursuing the MFA Writing program at Columbia University in New York.

== Journalistic work ==
Anena worked with the Daily Monitor newspaper as a reporter, sub-editor, and deputy chief sub-editor from 2009 to September 2014. She joined the African Centre for Media Excellence in 2014 and worked as a journalism trainer, media researcher, program coordinator and online content producer until 2019. In August 2019, Anena joined Columbia Journal as its online copy editor. Her journalistic articles have been published in the Daily Monitor, New Vision, The Observer, Columbia Journal, The Atlantic and Popula. She has also taught Specialized Writing to journalism students at Islamic University in Uganda.

== Writing ==
Anena wrote her first poem, "The plight of the Acholi child", in 2003. It won a writing competition organised by the Acholi Religious Leaders Peace Initiative and helped secure her a bursary for A-Level education. She attended the 2013 Caine Prize workshop held in Uganda, and her story "Watchdog Games" was published in the anthology A Memory This Size and Other Stories: The Caine Prize for African Writing, 2013. In 2013, she was shortlisted for the "Ghana Poetry prize" for her poem "We Arise".

A Nation In Labour, published in 2015, is her debut book, a "socially conscious" collection of poems. The New Vision wrote that "Anena and her buffet of poetry will keep you hooked." As described by Tomiwa Ilori, "A Nation in Labour is a four-part treatise that uses elevated language to tell of horror. Anena's collection of poetry warns society about its warped value system through a disciplined use of satiric responses that resonate. Each part of the treatise soaks our desiccated humanity in fluid cadences."

In November 2018, A Nation In Labour was shortlisted for the biennial Wole Soyinka Prize for Literature in Africa, alongside collections by Tanure Ojaide and Servio Gbadamosi. On 9 December 2018, at an award ceremony held in Lagos, Nigeria, Anena and Ojaide were announced joint winners. The prize was judged by Toyin Falola, Olu Obafemi and Margaret Busby (chair). The award was presented by Nobel Laureate, Professor Wole Soyinka.

Her work appears in 2019's New Daughters of Africa: An International Anthology of Writing by Women of African Descent, edited by Margaret Busby.

== Awards and recognition ==
In December 2018, Anena was named winner of the 2018 Wole Soyinka Prize for Literature in Africa for her book A Nation in Labour, published in 2015. She jointly won the prize with Professor Tanure Ojaide. Anena received her award at a ceremony in Lagos, Nigeria, attended by Wole Soyinka, Africa's first Nobel Laureate in literature, after whom the prize is named. The Wole Soyinka Prize for Literature is a "pan-African writing prize awarded biennially to the best literary work produced by an African".

Anena's short story "Dancing with Ma" was shortlisted for the 2018 Commonwealth Short Story Prize. In 2017 and 2018, her short fiction, "The Satans Inside My Jimmy" and "Waiting", were longlisted for the Short Story Day Africa Prize.

== Published works ==
=== Poetry collections ===
- A Nation In Labour. Kampala, Uganda: CreateSpace Publishing. 2015.

=== Selected poems ===
- "Forgiveness" and "We Arise", in Beverley Nambozo Nsengiyunva, ed. (2014). A Thousand Voices Rising: An anthology of contemporary African poetry. BN Poetry Foundation. ISBN 978-9970-9234-0-3.
- "Sharing My Man With A Country" in Enkare Review, 15 September 2016
- "I Died Alive" in The Suubi Collection (2013)

=== Selected short stories ===
- "The Satans Inside My Jimmy " in Hotel Africa: New Short Fiction from Africa, 2019
- "Dancing with Ma" in adda, 2018
- "Waiting " in ID: New Short Fiction from Africa, 2018
- "The Dogs Are Hungry " in Sooo Many Stories, 2014
- "The Axe" in Bookslive, 2014.

=== Selected articles ===
- "Review: No Roses from My Mouth by Dr Stella Nyanzi ", Columbia Journal, 25 February 2020
- "Strange that men, the stronger sex, should become weaker sex in rape", Daily Monitor, 12 January 2020
- "I’m Emptying My Bank Account to Go to Columbia", The Atlantic, 18 July 2019
- "For Dr. Stella Nyanzi: I Plead Guilty to Silence", Journeys Within, 15 June 2019
- "#MissCurvyUganda: Here’s why we are cutting the tree and ignoring the roots", Journeys Within, 12 February 2019
- "A Sack of Cash: When President Museveni Makes it Rain", Popula, 18 October 2018
- "The End of Allowing: Bobi Wine, Bebe Cool and Uganda's Bottle Revolution", Popula, 20 September 2018
- "Mr President, how much do you know about conflict resolution?", Daily Monitor, 13 October 2013
- "Gen Sejusa, you owe my people an apology", Daily Monitor, 22 December 2013
- "Child labour should be a concern for all", Daily Monitor, 31 March 2013.
