= Dinaane Debut Fiction Award =

South African literary award

The Dinaane Debut Fiction Award – formerly the European Union Literary Award – is a South African literary award, open to permanent residents or citizens of South Africa and other southern African countries. The prize was first given in 2004 and was renamed in 2015. The word “dinaane” means “telling our stories together” in Setswana.

The prize is an initiative of the Jacana Literary Foundation (JLF), a not-for-profit organisation that seeks to promote and foster excellent writing from southern Africa, in partnership with Johannesburg-based publisher Jacana Media. External funding allows the JLF to publish and disseminate literature that might not otherwise be commercially viable.

The competition accepts debut, unpublished works of fiction (novel or novella). Authors must not have had a work of fiction formally published prior to the award. Self-published authors may apply, provided that the work has only been published online. Although the entries must be primarily in English, Jacana welcomes innovative writing that captures the multilingual African landscape. The winner is awarded R35 000 and a publishing contract from Jacana Media. In addition, the Kraak Writing Grant is awarded to an entrant whose manuscript showed great promise. The grant is valued at R25,000 and is dedicated to the memory of writer and human rights activist Gerald Kraak.

Other projects currently administered by the JLF are:

- The Sol Plaatje European Union Poetry Award and Anthology: Named after South African writer Solomon Tshekisho Plaatje, the Sol Plaatje European Union Poetry Award and Anthology are made possible through ongoing support by the European Union. Up to three poems in any of South Africa’s official languages may be submitted, and the longlist published in an anthology. Cash prizes of R6000, R4000 and R2000 are awarded to the winner and runners-up.
- The Gerald Kraak Anthology and Prize: Created in honour of Gerald Kraak, this prize invites submissions from writers and photographers across Africa on the topics of gender, human rights and sexuality.

== Winners ==
Dinaane Debut Fiction Award

- 2023/2024: Lindani Mbunyuza-Memani, Buried in the Chest
- 2022: [no award]
- 2021: [no award]
- 2020: Resoketswe Manenzhe, Scatterlings
- 2019: Mubanga Kalimamukwento, The Mourning Bird
- 2015/2016: Tammy Baikie, Selling LipService

European Union Literary Award

- 2014: Andrew Miller, Dub Steps
- 2013: Penny Busetto, The Story of Anna P, as Told by Herself
- 2011/12: Ashraf Kagee, Khalil's Journey
- 2010: James Clelland, Deeper than Colour
- 2009: Zinaid Meeran, Saracen at the Gates
- 2008: Megan Voysey-Braig,Till We Can Keep an Animal
- 2007: Kopano Matlwa, Coconut
- 2006: [no award]
- 2005: Fred Khumalo, Bitches' Brew; and Gerald Kraak, Ice in the Lungs
- 2004: Ishtiyaq Shukri, The Silent Minaret
