= Sefi Atta =

Nigerian author and playwright (born 1964)

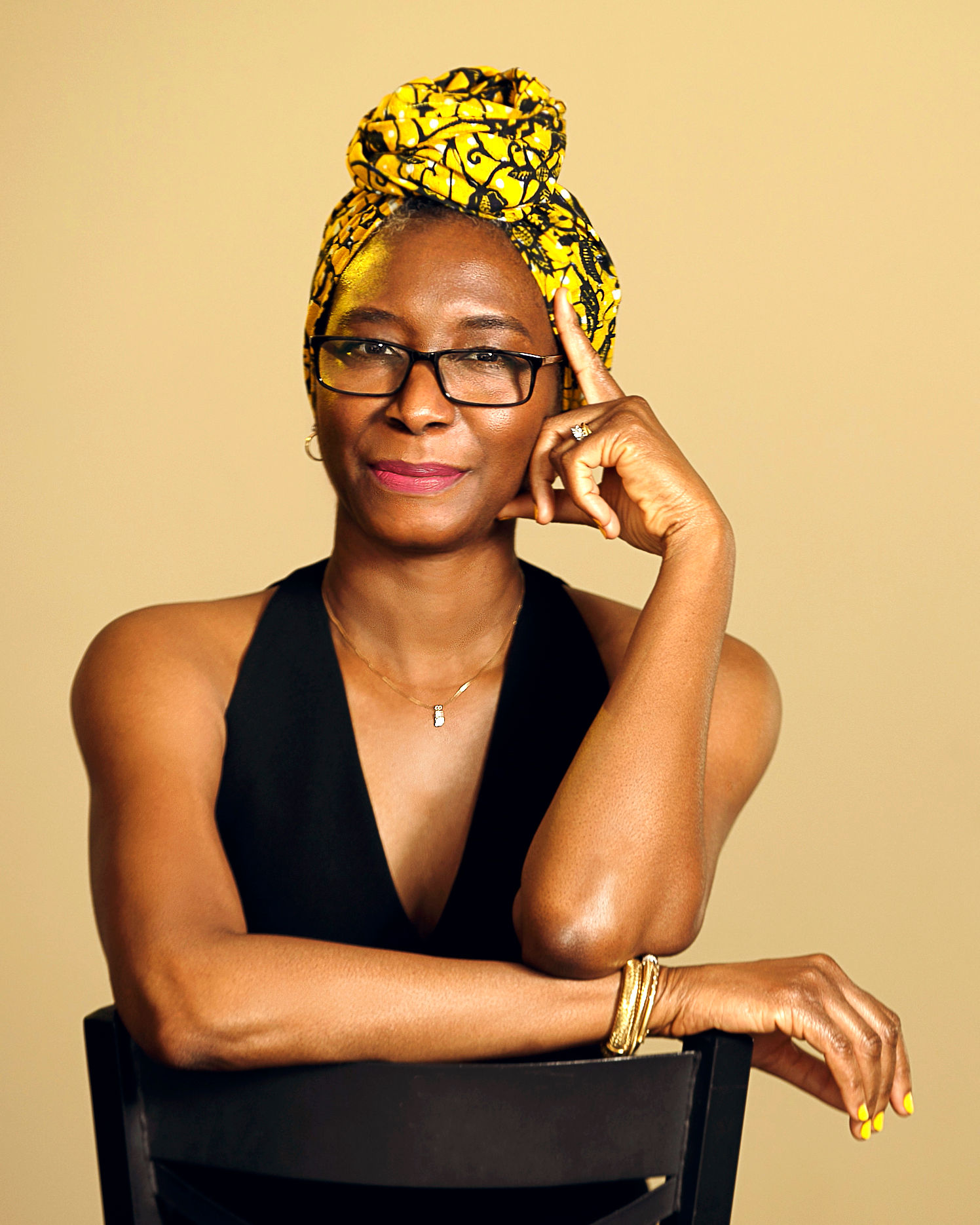
- Born: January 1964 (age 62); Lagos, Nigeria
- Education: Birmingham University; Antioch University Los Angeles
- Occupations: novelist; short-story writer; playwright; screenwriter
- Notable work: Everything Good Will Come
- Spouse: Gboyega Ransome-Kuti
- Website: www.sefiatta.com

Sefi Atta (born in January 1964) is a Nigerian-American novelist, short-story writer, playwright and screenwriter. Her books have been translated into many languages, her radio plays have been broadcast by the BBC, and her stage plays have been performed internationally. Awards she has received include the 2006 Wole Soyinka Prize for Literature in Africa and the 2009 Noma Award for Publishing in Africa.

== Biography ==
Atta was born in Lagos, Nigeria, in January 1964, to a family of five children. Her father Abdul-Aziz Atta was the Secretary to Federal Government and Head of the Civil Service until his death in 1972, and she was raised by her mother Iyabo Atta.

She attended Queen's College, Lagos, and Millfield School in England. In 1985, she graduated with a B.A. degree from Birmingham University. She qualified as a chartered accountant in England and as CPA in the United States, where she migrated in 1994. She earned an MFA in creative writing from Antioch University Los Angeles in 2001.

She is married to Gboyega Ransome-Kuti, a medical doctor, and son of Olikoye Ransome-Kuti, and they have one child, named Temi.

== Career ==
Atta graduated from the creative writing program at Antioch University in Los Angeles. Her short stories have appeared in literary journals such as The Los Angeles Review, Mississippi Review and World Literature Today. She has also written essays, and her articles on Lagos and Nigeria have appeared in publications such as Time and Libération. Her books have been translated into several languages. Her first novel, Everything Good Will Come, won the inaugural Wole Soyinka Prize for Literature in Africa in 2006. She is a contributor to the 2019 anthology New Daughters of Africa, edited by Margaret Busby.

Atta's Lagos-based production company Atta Girl supports Care to Read, a programme she initiated to earn funds for legitimate charities through staged readings.

== Bibliography ==
Novels

- 2005: Everything Good Will Come, US: Interlink Books, ISBN 978-1566565707. UK: Myriad Editions, ISBN 978-1-912408-52-8
- 2010: Swallow, Interlink Books, ISBN 978-1566568333
- 2013: A Bit of Difference, Interlink Books, ISBN 978-1566568920
- 2019: The Bead Collector, US: Interlink Books, ISBN 978-1623719852. UK: Myriad Editions, ISBN 978-1-912408-34-4
- 2022: The Bad Immigrant, Interlink Books, ISBN 978-1623719050
- 2027: The Gele Gang, Interlink Books, ISBN 978-1623715199

Short-story collections

- 2010: News from Home, Interlink Books, ISBN 978-1566568036
- 2025: Indigene, Interlink Books, ISBN 978-1623716066

Children's book

- 2018: Drama Queen, AAA Press, Nigeria, ISBN 978-978-967-959-1

Young Adult novel

- 2024: Good-for-Nothing Girl, Interlink Books, ISBN 978-1623717568

Play collections

- 2019: Sefi Atta; Selected Plays, Interlink Books, ISBN 978-1623719791

Stage play premieres

- 2005: The Engagement, MUSON Centre, Lagos
- 2011: The Cost of Living, Lagos Heritage Festival
- 2011: Hagel auf Zamfara, Theatre Krefeld, Germany
- 2012: The Naming Ceremony, New World Nigeria, Theatre Royal Stratford East, London
- 2012: An Ordinary Legacy, The MUSON Festival, MUSON Centre, Lagos
- 2014: Last Stand, Terra Kulture, Lagos
- 2018: Renovation, The Jos Festival of Theatre
- 2019: The Death Road, The Jos Festival of Theatre

Radio plays

- 2002: The Engagement, BBC Radio
- 2004: Makinwa's Miracle, BBC Radio
- 2007: A Free Day, BBC Radio

Screenplays

- 2021: Swallow, a Netflix original movie based on Sefi Atta's second novel, Swallow, co-written by Atta and Kunle Afolayan, premiered on October 1.

== Awards and recognition ==
- 2002: Macmillan Writers Prize For Africa, shortlist
- 2002: BBC African Performance, 2nd Prize
- 2002: Zoetrope Short Fiction Contest, 3rd Prize
- 2003: Red Hen Press Short Story Award, 1st prize
- 2003: Glimmer Train′s Very Short Fiction Award, finalist
- 2004: BBC African Performance, 2nd Prize
- 2005: PEN International David TK Wong Prize, 1st Prize
- 2006: Caine Prize for African Writing, shortlist
- 2006: Wole Soyinka Prize for Literature in Africa
- 2009: Noma Award for Publishing in Africa
- 2009: The American Zoetrope Screenplay Competition, quarter-finalist
- 2019: WeScreenPlay Diverse Voices Lab, finalist
- 2019: The American Zoetrope Screenplay Competition, finalist
- 2021: The National Playwrights Conference, semifinalist

Visiting Writer

- 2024: Jackson State University
- 2006: University of Southern Mississippi
- 2008: Northwestern University
- 2010: École Normale Supérieure de Lyon

Other News

- Atta was on the jury for the 2010 Neustadt International Prize for Literature, and a judge for the 2019 Caine Prize for African Writing.
- A critical study of her works, Writing Contemporary Nigeria: How Sefi Atta Illuminates African Culture and Tradition, edited by Professor Walter P. Collins, III, was published by Cambria Press in 2015.
- In November 2025, she participated in the Nobel Symposium in Literature on the topic Retrieving Pasts, Imagining Futures: Creative Forms in African Writing, hosted by the Stellenbosch Institute for Advanced Study (STIAS) in South Africa.
