= Everything Good Will Come =

2005 novel by Sefi Atta

- Author: Sefi Atta
- Language: English
- Genre: Fiction
- Published: 2005 (Interlink Books)
- Publication place: Nigeria
- Media type: novel
- Pages: 336 pages
- Awards: Wole Soyinka Prize for Literature in Africa
- ISBN: 1566565707
- OCLC: 57075862

Everything Good Will Come is a coming-of-age novel by Nigerian author Sefi Atta about a girl growing into a woman in postcolonial Nigeria and England. It was published by Interlink World Fiction in 2005, and won the Wole Soyinka Prize for Literature in Africa.

Throughout the novel the main character, Enitan, is faced with various personal entanglements connected with family troubles, rape, cheating boyfriends, and imprisonment. The novel is also a biting commentary on post-independence governments in Nigeria and tensions between Igbo (Biafrans), Yoruba, and Hausa ethnic groups after the Biafran War.

== Plot summary ==
Everything Good Will Come is a bildungsroman that tells the story of Enitan, a young Nigerian woman growing up in her native homeland coping with the demands of the patriarchal society that encompasses her. Enitan is raised in a divided home struggling to identify herself in the midst of her mother's strong religious beliefs and her father's manipulative political ways. Due to her being an only child and the death of her brother, her parents have strict demands that restrict her from having a normal childhood. Her rebellious nature is first seen when she defies her mother's wishes and leaves the house on Sundays to play with the girl next door, Sheri, who is considered "yellow" because her father is Nigerian and her mother is a white English woman. Sheri is a sassy young girl with a rebellious nature, constantly testing those around her, while craving the attention of any male. Their friendship builds as they continue to defy Enitan's mother by seeing each other.

The girls are soon forced to separate; Enitan is sent to a school outside Lagos. Her father, an educated lawyer, wants the best for her and hopes she will take over his firm once she has finished school and proves herself as a lawyer. Sheri and Enitan keep in touch, writing letters back and forth about school, boys, and when they will meet again. During a holiday visit home, Enitan and Sheri meet up and go to a party. Enitan, who doesn't feel comfortable in the situation, wants to leave. On her way out, she witnesses the three men pinning Sheri down, raping her and bruising her body; they also degrade her. The image of Sheri's rape affects Enitan's ability to allow herself to trust men. The aftermath of the rape leads to a partial termination of their friendship, and Sheri being sent to the hospital due to an attempt to give herself an abortion.

Years pass and Enitan returns to Lagos to stay with her father and work under him, thereby starting her career as a lawyer. She begins dating a struggling artist, Mike, and has an emotionally complex but short-lived relationship with him. Enitan runs into Sheri one afternoon and reconnects with her. Sheri is now a mistress to a Muslim brigadier, who pays for her living and gives Sheri a good life. She believes in playing the system rather than settling down with a man because she is aware of the lack of individualism a woman receives once she becomes married in their society.

Enitan gradually becomes close to a man called Niyi Franco, who is separated from his only child that was taken away by his ex-wife when they moved to Britain. This relationship quickly becomes a marriage. Enitan at first feels comfort and safety in Niyi's arms, but their relationship is soon tested when she refuses to submit to his demanding ways and struggles to conceive and carry a child. After she becomes pregnant, Niyi and Enitan's differences over each other's behavior and expectations build. In addition to the stress from her failing marriage, her father's political outspokenness and subsequent arrest force her into activism and result in a night in jail. Enitan joins a group of women in the fight against the government for women's rights during her pregnancy. Her drive for change is frowned upon by her husband, who wants her to stay at home and take on "women-like" tasks. Niyi's lack of support for his wife's beliefs, along with her unwillingness to concede to his requests, leads to their separation. Enitan continues to stand up for what she believes in: wanting women to have the ability to choose whether or not they will be submissive in society, with hopes for individuality.

== Characters ==
=== Enitan ===
Enitan is the main female character that the story follows. The novel starts when she is a little girl and meets Sheri for the first time. It progresses along with Enitan's life. In the beginning, Enitan witnesses the rape of her friend Sheri, which causes her to withdraw from the latter. Throughout her life, Enitan's father, and later her husband Niyi, encourage her to stand up for herself. This causes her to always speak her mind when it comes to her rights, even in the face of adversity. The political changes in her country affect Enitan's life in many different ways. First, she comes home from college and has to go through military training and later she has to deal with gas shortages, being stopped on the roadside by soldiers, her father's and her own arrest. As she grows, she comes to realize that she has lived a privileged life even though she has had to deal with the stigma of being a woman in Nigeria. She also finds out that she has a brother while her father is in prison. Although they become friendly with each other, this just reinforces the fact that Enitan cannot trust any of the men in her life to treat a woman with respect or as an equal. Enitan is a strong female lead in the novel who fights the traditional male dominant culture that she lives in. She is the example of the Nigerian woman who is educated and fights for the nice life that she has lived. Her own time in jail shows Enitan the reality of how the people in her country, specifically the woman, are being treated by the people in power. At the end of the novel, she breaks tradition and leaves her husband to lead a group of women fighting for the release of political prisoners.

=== Sheri ===
Sheri is also a part of the story from the very beginning. Her life is hugely affected by her rape in the beginning of the novel. When she becomes pregnant after it, she aborts her baby with a clothes hanger, making herself barren in the process. To a Nigerian woman, being barren is the worst thing that a woman could be and being able to have children is the major value of a woman, which Sheri has now lost. She also grows up in a family with more than one wife. She has therefore always seen firsthand the more traditional side of her culture, which certainly influences her decision to live as a mistress in order to survive. When Sheri and Enitan meet again after Enitan comes home from England, Sheri is the mistress of the Brigadier. Up until this point, Sheri is the other type of woman in Nigeria: the one who depends on a man. In exchange for an easier lifestyle, she plays the role of housewife and does all of the cooking, cleaning, and care of her man. Sheri knows how to take advantage of the fact that men often stray from their marriages in Nigeria and it is even considered normal to have more than one wife or women on the side. Enitan gives Sheri the idea of a catering business, which she puts into motion when the Brigadier hits her. This enables Sheri and her family to take care of themselves without being supported by a man. Sheri and Enitan are very important characters because they show the contrast between the two ways that a woman can survive in Nigeria. She is also a character who is deprived of motherly care and the privilege to experience the joys of motherhood. She is often referred to as a strong person by Enitan.

=== Sunny and Enitan's mother ===
Sunny is Enitan's father. He is the person who starts her thoughts of fighting for her rights. In her childhood, Sunny tells his daughter not to worry about learning how to cook because he says that girls don't need to learn that in her generation. He fills her head with such ideas, but later when she grows up and uses his lessons against him he reverts to being a sexist male. Sunny expects Enitan to stand up for herself except for when it comes to himself: everything he says is supposed to be right regardless of logic. Sunny's character shows how hard it is to escape the traditional mindset that the males in Nigerian culture have the final word regardless of what the women think. Enitan's mother starts out as the villain of the story and later turns out to be a victim of society. While married to Sunny, she is constantly ridiculed for her beliefs and actions and seems unhinged with her part in the church. Later in the novel, it is revealed that Enitan's mother is a woman who tried everything to save her son and breaks down when nothing can be done for him. Enitan brings her mother back into her life when she realizes that Sunny believes in the traditional roles of man and woman, which is the same reason that Enitan's mother leaves Sunny early in the story. She learns to relate to her mother because as women they are both subject to the demands of the men in their life until they separate from those men. Enitan's parents are important to the story because as time goes on, the reader learns how their marriage fell apart and how this affects Enitan.

=== Niyi ===
Niyi is Enitan's husband with whom she later has a child. At the beginning of their relationship, Niyi is just like her father and tells her to stand up for her rights when the men at her job try to take advantage of her in a work-related way. Up until Enitan gets pregnant everything seems all right with their relationship, even though Niyi acts like a child that Enitan has to take care of instead of a grown man. Soon Niyi expects Enitan to obey him, and while his concern is for the unborn baby, he also cannot handle the fact that Enitan does things that he tells her not to do. He doesn't want Enitan to draw interest from the government when her father is arrested, but she gets arrested herself when she becomes involved with Grace Ameh, who Niyi also doesn't want Enitan to have anything to do with. Niyi only helps take care of Enitan when their situation is at an extreme and the baby is in danger after Enitan's mother dies. Unfortunately for him, this shows that he has always been capable of helping out around the house and cleaning up after himself and instead let Enitan do everything. This contributes to their divorce, but the major reason is that Niyi refuses to support Enitan's interest in helping women prisoners.

=== Grace Ameh ===
Grace is the reason that Enitan is able to get more information about her father and she influences Enitan to put herself in danger. Enitan is arrested because she is attending a reading that Grace is a part of, and both women are taken to prison where Enitan sees firsthand the treatment that women and prisoners in general receive. Grace also invites her into the group of women who campaign for prisoners, and this is the group that Enitan leaves her husband for when he won't support her interest in it.

Mike is the first man whom Enitan really likes following her return to Nigeria from college and he treats her well. After she fights with her father about his son, Debayo Taiwo, she leaves her father's house for Mike's and finds him with another woman. This is an early example for her of how the men in her life cannot be relied upon and only think of themselves. Most of the men in her life, her husband and father especially, tell her to be a strong woman and to stand up for herself except for when it comes to them.

== Nigerian culture and history ==
Nigeria is home to over 250 ethnic groups and over 50 languages. However, the three most dominant tribes in the country are Hausa, Yoruba and Igbo. The Hausa dominate the northern region of Nigeria, the Yoruba dominate the southwestern region, and the Igbo dominate the southeastern region. Religious differences also endorse the strong divide between different regions of Nigeria. The Hausa are predominantly Muslim. The Igbo are mostly Catholic Christians, and Yorubas are split between Christians of various denominations and Muslims. The different tribes of Nigeria operated as separate states with little interactions with each other until its unification and colonization by Great Britain in 1914. During the colonization of Nigeria by Great Britain, local tribes were used to govern their regions and the British government served as the central power. The Hausa excelled in the military field and made up most of the colony's military forces. Since the trade capitals and oil reserves of Nigeria are located in the south, the Yoruba and Igbo naturally excelled in education and trades. The balance of power was well-regulated by the British so there were little ethnic conflicts.

After Nigeria gained independence in 1960, the balance of power was maintained through elections and a democratic approach to all national issues. However, the situation became volatile with back-to-back military coups that were led mostly by corrupt Hausa military officers. The coups also generated ethnic violence between the different groups and tension was high. In an attempt to rule its own region, the Igbo declared themselves independent from Nigeria, and named the southeastern region of the nation Biafra. But since most of Nigeria's valuable natural resources lay in the new "Biafra", Nigeria refused to recognize the newly formed country, which led to war between Nigeria and Biafra. The war lasted from 1967 to 1970, claiming about 3 million civilian and military casualties. At the end, the Biafran state was eradicated and discontinued. This is why "Biafra" carries a negative connotation in the book.

Currently, all tribes of Nigeria are functioning in a cooperative manner though underlying tension still strains the relationship. Although members of the different tribes interact freely all over the nation and equally share political powers, the clear division among tribes leads to civil unrest and rebellion. Enitan and her father spent time in prison due to their rebellion.

== Political unrest and religion ==
Other important themes in Everything Good Will Come include political unrest and religion. Throughout the book, which covers many years, political unrest is present and, though it is not explicitly said, much of this conflict has to do with religion and the distribution of wealth and power. The book is set mainly before and during the Nigerian Civil War (1967–70) or the "Nigerian-Biafran War". The main character and her family are Yoruba. At the beginning of the novel we see how different characters view the war and react to it. The main character Enitan's father, Sunny, is a lawyer and has two fellow lawyers as friends. Enitan describes how they were so close they considered themselves, when they were studying at Cambridge together, the "Three Musketeers" in the heart of darkness. When the war starts we see how the allegiances of these friends are divided. One joins the Biafran side out of fear and is killed. Another supports and encourages the Yoruba movement, while Sunny seems to quietly support it. Later in the novel, when Enitan is in law school in Britain, she hears of all the political unrest still in her country although the war ended in the '70s. She talks about how people are being imprisoned without charge, the suspension of the constitution by the military regimes that had taken over Nigeria in order to enforce peace and discipline in the country. When she returns to Nigeria, she realizes her father has become politically involved, has been imprisoned and, despite the objections of her husband, she decides to become involved as well.

In the Yoruba and Igbo tribes in the southern parts of Nigeria, Christianity is the dominant religion because of the early and quick success of the Christian missionaries when they first arrived; construction of Anglican and other Christian churches followed. Enitan's mother, Mama Enitan, is a devout Anglican. Throughout the story, Enitan describes her perception of the ways and beliefs of her mother's church. Sunny uses his wife's religion as a way to belittle her, call her crazy and endanger Enitan's life, which, at times is not completely false. Yet, the importance of religion to Mama Enitan is strong as she has lost her son to disease, suffers through a bad marriage and is subject to the dual pressure put on all the Nigerian women that resulted from colonization and sexist societal attitudes; she turns to religion as one would self-medicate with drugs, alcohol or sexual activity as an escape from reality.

== Significance ==
The significance of Everything Good Will Come lies within the historical perspective Sefi Atta uses to look at her character's life. By being based in a true Nigerian culture and political atmosphere, this fictional story has relevance for the time period in which it is set. This relation between fact and fiction gives the reader insight into how likely the story is and the effect politics plays within each character's life. Although the focus is on the middle and upper classes, the unsettled government of the 1970s through 1990s is still well represented. The history of this novel follows Nigeria through a civil war and into the Second and Third Republic, all times of different political powers but connected through the characters' lives.

The author also has credibility for writing about this time period because much of her life experiences paralleled those of Enitan. Born in 1964, Sefi Atta was only seven years old in 1971 when the novel begins. Her childlike perspective of this time is seen in the novel by having Enitan's character at a similar age, aligning Sefi and Enitan's ages and developing their perception as the novel progresses. Both women also receive their education abroad in England and then return to their native homes. Although their majors differ, Enitan and Sefi's perspectives of being a Nigerian abroad would be quite similar by experiencing the same "culture shock." In an interview with Ike Anya, Sefi even acknowledges similar characters in her own life, stating "every Nigerian knows a Sheri." She also recalls experiencing similar situations such as dealing with her mother's traditional belief that "women must fulfill their duties as wives and mothers, no excuses," a viewpoint that conflicted with not only her own but Enitan's as well. The parallels between Sefi's and Enitan's lives allow the novel to have a realistic foundation and give accurate insight to the history and culture of this time period.

The generation Enitan represents was born in the late 1960s, so is younger by comparison with those in many other novels of a similar genre, giving Atta's book a unique perspective. The main difference lies in the different political atmosphere each generation faces. Rather than living through colonialism, those growing up in this timeframe face the aftermath of it. In terms of this generational representation, Atta states: "I consciously did not hold back as I wrote and ended up with this very personal chronicle of post-independent Nigeria." This brings up the issue of political instability as a repercussion of colonialism by showing Nigeria at a time of political flux. The argument against colonialism is discussed by the characters: "Uncle Alex blamed the British for the fighting ‘...Come here and divide our country like one of their bloody teacakes.’" Because of this blame on the British, this novel has more significance in its publication locations: the United States, England, and Nigeria, all of which have become united through colonization, which brought western culture into Nigeria.

The idea of universalism is shown by the fact that although the women of these countries may seem very different, they all face many of the same issues. At this time, England and the United States were seen as more progressive in gender ideals through women having the ability to maintain independence, but they still faced discrimination in the work place as Enitan did in her father's firm. All three countries are also faced with infidelity and race discrimination, issues that make this story relevant beyond Nigeria. To combat these issues, Atta shows the negative effects and allows her main female protagonists to gain independence in the conclusion of the novel.

This positive outlook on a woman's ability to become self-sufficient and successful against family and political strains of this time contributed to this novel receiving the Wole Soyinka Prize for Literature in Africa.
