= Kopano Matlwa =

South African writer (born 1985)

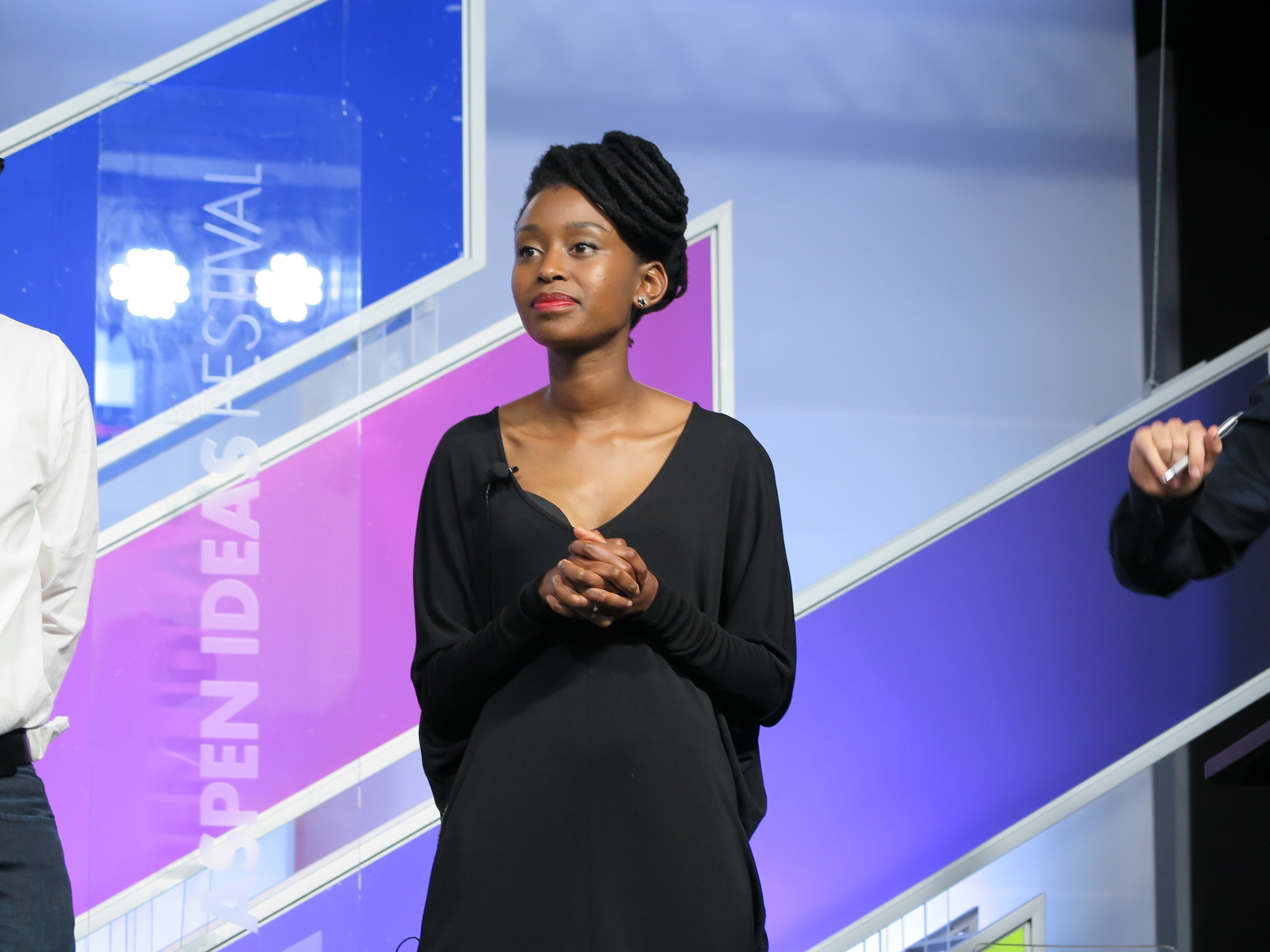
- Matlwa in 2015
- Born: 1985 (age 40–41); South Africa
- Education: University of Cape Town; University of Oxford
- Occupations: Novelist, physician
- Writing career
- Genre: Fiction
- Notable works: Coconut, Spilt Milk
- Website: www.kopanomabaso.com

Kopano Matlwa (born 1985) is a South African writer and doctor, known for her novel Spilt Milk, which focuses on the South Africa's "Born Free" generation, and Coconut, her debut novel, which addresses issues of race, class, and colonization in modern Johannesburg. Coconut was awarded the European Union Literary Award in 2006/2007 and also won the Wole Soyinka Prize for Literature in Africa in 2010. Spilt Milk was on the longlist for the 2011 Sunday Times Fiction Prize. She is currently the Executive Director of the Zero Stunting Campaign which is a South African multi-funder initiative that aims to reduce the prevalence of stunting in South Africa by 2020.

== Early life ==
Kopano Matlwa Mabaso (née Matlwa) was born in 1985 in a township outside of Pretoria, South Africa. She began writing in 2004, when HIV was devastating South Africa, later saying: "Writing was debriefing for myself, trying to make sense of all the crazy things I would see."

== Education ==
Mabaso received her medical degree from the University of Cape Town then completed her master's in global health science and Doctorate (PhD) in population health from Oxford University, where she was granted a Rhodes Scholarship.

== Career ==
Matlwa was nine or ten years old in 1994 when Nelson Mandela was elected president of South Africa, and she told NPR that she remembers it as an "exciting time". "We were the 'Rainbow Nation,' and kind of the 'golden children' of Africa." As she grew up, however, Matlwa says that the sense of hope and newness fell away to the reality of a corruptible government. She is also a Rhodes Scholar and physician, who wrote her first novel, Coconut, while completing her medical degree. Matlwa has been cited as the emerging voice of a new generation of South African writers, dealing with issues such as race, poverty and gender. Coconut has been noted for its exploration of women's appearance, including the political aspect of black women's hair.

While still in medical school at the University of Cape Town, Matlwa co-founded the Waiting Room Education by Medical Students (WREM). This service educates patients and their families on common health conditions in the waiting rooms of mobile clinics. Her non-literary honours include: Young Physician Leader by the Inter Academies Medial Panel in 2014, 2015 class of Tutu Fellows and Aspen Institute's New Voices in Global Health Fellow. Ona-Mtoto-Wako, an initiative to bring antenatal health care to pregnant women living in remote and rural parts of the developing world that she co-founded with her friend Chrystelle Wedi, won the 2015 Aspen Idea Award.

Matlwa is the executive director of Grow Great, a campaign aimed at mobilizing South Africa towards achieving a stunting-free generation by 2030. Stunting is a medical condition where a child has impaired growth and development as a result of "poor nutrition, repeated infection, and inadequate psychosocial stimulation." Matlwa is also the founder of the Transitions Foundation, an organization that seeks to help South Africa's youth transition from hopelessness to personal fulfilment through education.

== Books ==
=== Coconut ===
Coconut is set in post-apartheid South Africa and is built around the concept of the "coconut", which is a person "who is black but who speaks like a white person". It delves into the complex society that was supposed to be free but "as new freedoms are born with difficulty, [they] often reveal fresh problems or create them." The novel is divided into two narratives: Fifi, who is a member of the black middle class, and Fiks, a poor black orphan. Both of these protagonists struggle with finding their identity in the new multiracial society; they experience the divide between various African ideals and global Western values of whiteness.

=== Spilt Milk ===
Spilt Milk focuses on the South Africa's "Born Free" generation, or those who became adults in the post-Apartheid era. The novel’s protagonist is Mohumagadi, a black principal of her own successful school. The novel explores the relationship between Mohumagadi and her students and also the relationship between Mohumagadi and a white priest who is living through hard times. While writing this novel, Matlwa felt disappointed with the new post-Apartheid era politics and with personal feelings; it was not everything that was promised. The characters in the novel and their interactions with one another are representative of the feelings of disappointment that the South African “born free” generation experienced. They soon found "deceit and greed and corruption creeping into society."

=== Period Pain ===
In 2016, Matlwa published her third novel, Period Pain. This novel discusses how South Africans discriminate against foreign nationals and how “xenophobia exists within households and institutions." It follows Masechaba’s story as she grows up in South Africa, dealing with how South Africans are perceived by other Africans as enslaved and spoiled. Through her struggles and marked events in her life, the reader is exposed to the mental health challenges that not only affect patients but also the professionals who deal with the patients. Matlwa’s Period Pain was shortlisted for the 2017 Sunday Times Barry Ronge Fiction Prize, the South African Literary Awards, and South Africa’s Humanities and Social Sciences Award.

== Works ==
- Coconut (Jacana, 2007), ISBN 9781431403899
- Spilt Milk (Jacana, 2010), ISBN 9781431404018
- Period Pain (Jacana, 2017), ISBN 978-1431424375. As Evening Primrose (London: Sceptre, 2017), ISBN 978-1473662261

== Awards ==
- 2007 European Literary Award (for her novel Coconut)
- 2010 Wole Soyinka Prize for Literature in Africa (joint winner for her novel Coconut)
- 2014 Young Physician Leader (selected by the Interacademies Media Panel)
- 2015 Aspen Idea Award
- 2015 Tutu Fellowship
- 2015 Aspen New Voices Fellow
