= Penny Busetto =

South African writer

- Born: Durban, South Africa
- Occupation: Novelist
- Writing career
- Genre: Fiction
- Notable works: The Story of Anna P, as Told by Herself
- Notable awards: European Union Literary Award; University of Johannesburg Debut Prize

Penny Busetto is a South African writer known for her 2014 novel The Story of Anna P, as Told by Herself. The Story of Anna P, as Told by Herself was awarded the 2013 European Union Literary Award as well as the 2014 University of Johannesburg Debut Prize, and in 2016 was shortlisted for the Etisalat Prize for Literature.

Busetto was born in Durban, South Africa, and grew up in Cape Town. She moved to Italy when she was 17, where she studied and married. She moved back to Cape Town in 1996, where she lives with her son. She is currently pursuing her doctorate in English and psychology, and has stated that the title character of her debut novel, Anna P, is somewhat inspired by Anna O, one of the first people to undergo psychoanalysis.
