= Pre-colonial history of Northern Nigeria =

The pre-colonial history of Northern Nigeria encompasses the history of Northern Nigeria before the advent of European explorers and the subsequent pacification of Northern Nigeria by the British Empire. In pre-historical times, the area known as Northern Nigeria was home to the Kwatarkwashi/Nok culture. Elements of human civilization have also been discovered around the Niger River near Kainji Dam.

== Kabara Period ==
Around the 7th century the Kabara Nation under the control of the Kabara's emerged in Northern Nigeria. Around the 9th century an upheaval of unexplained origins saw a transference of power from these matriarchal monarchs and a new set of nations emerged in their place.

== The Fourteen Kingdoms ==
In the 9th century a set kingdoms emerged in Northern Nigeria to replace the Kabara Nation, these Kingdoms share a similar ethno-historical dynamic cemented in their belief in a common origin. The lore of the Fourteen Kingdoms unify the diverse heritage of Northern Nigeria into a cohesive system. Seven of these Kingdoms developed from the Kabara legacy of the Hausa people. In the 9th century as vibrant trading centers competing with Kanem-Bornu and Mali slowly developed in the Central Sudan, a set Kingdoms merged dominating the great savannah plains of Hausaland, their primary exports were leather, gold, cloth, salt, kola nuts, animal hides, and henna. The Seven Hausa states included:

- Daura ?–1806
- Kano 998–1807
- Katsina c. 1400–1805
- Zazzau (Zaria) c. 1200–1808
- Gobir ?–1808
- Rano
- Biram c. 1100–1805 (also known as Hadejia)

The growth and conquest of the Hausa Bakwai resulted in the founding of additional states with rulers tracing their lineage to a concubine of the Hausa founding father, Bayajidda. Thus they are called the 'Banza Bakwai meaning Bastard Seven. The Banza Bakwai adopted many of the customs and institutions of the Hausa Bakwai but were considered unsanctioned or copy-cat kingdoms by non-Hausa people. These states include:

- Zamfara
- Kebbi
- Yauri (also called Yawuri)
- Gwari (also called Gwariland)
- Kwararafa (a Jukun state)
- Nupe (of the Nupe people)

== Sudanic States ==
The Sudanic States emerged from the wake of the upheaval that transformed the system of governance in the central Sudan to patriarchal system. With influence of Islamic Mali Empire, the Hausa Kingdoms were replaced beginning with the Kingdom of Kano by a set of sultanates in the 11th century. The rise of the Sultanates led to series of wars that periodically saw the emergence of organised Empires in Northern Nigeria, by the 17th century, however, these empire had debilitated their economies and have largely stagnated. The parallel rise Fula influence resulted in a wave of ethnic Jihads that saw the rise of the Sokoto Caliphate encompassing much of Northern Nigeria and Northern Cameroon.

== Sokoto Caliphate ==
The Sokoto Caliphate emerged from a series of religious campaigns led by the Fula people. By 1809 it had encompassed much of Northern Nigeria and Northern Cameroon.
