= Fred Khumalo =

South African journalist and novelist (born 1966)

- Born: 4 August 1966 (age 59); Chesterville, Durban, Natal, South Africa
- Education: Technikon Natal; University of the Witwatersrand
- Occupations: Journalist and author
- Notable work: Bitches' Brew (2007); Touch My Blood (2011); #ZuptasMustFall (2016); Dancing the Death Drill (2017); Talk of the Town (2019)
- Awards: European Union Literary Award; Alan Paton Award; Nadine Gordimer Short Story Award
- Website: fredkhumalo.wordpress.com

Fred Khumalo (born 4 August 1966) is a South African journalist and author. His books encompass various genres, including novels, non-fiction, memoir and short stories. Among awards he has received are the European Union Literary Award, the Alan Paton Award and the Nadine Gordimer Short Story Award. His writing has appeared in various publications, including the Sunday Times, Toronto Star, New African, The Sowetan and Isolezwe. In 2008, he hosted Encounters, a public-debate television programme, on SABC 2.

== Biography ==
Born in Chesterville, Durban, Natal (now KwaZulu-Natal), Khumalo grew up in Mpumalanga Township. While still at high school he decided to become a writer, and went on to graduate from Durban's Technikon Natal (now the Durban University of Technology) after studying journalism, then earning an MA degree in creative writing from the University of the Witwatersrand with distinction. He is the recipient of a Nieman Fellowship from Harvard University, as well as fellowships from the Johannesburg Institute for Advanced Study, the Stellenbosch Institute for Advanced Study, and the Academy for the Arts of the World in Cologne, Germany.

=== Writing ===
As a journalist and columnist, Khumalo has written for publications in South Africa, Canada, and the United Kingdom, including for City Press, Sunday World, the Sunday Times, The Sowetan, UmAfrika, Isolezwe, This Day, Toronto Star, New African, and the Mail & Guardian. His short stories have appeared in such magazines and literary journals as Drum, Tribute, Pace, Staffrider, and The Johannesburg Review of Books.

His first novel, Bitches' Brew (its title referencing the similarly titled album by Miles Davis), was published to acclaim, winning Khumalo the European Union Literary Award in 2006. Reviewer Victor Dlamini wrote in the Sunday Times: "Fred Khumalo bares his own soul by revealing his own love for the beautiful art of jazz. It is his ability to narrate the story of a love that promised so much and how it was strangled by the hard hand of history, that makes Khumalo's novel stand out. He does not flinch from taking the reader beyond the glamour and shine of the life a successful bootlegger and budding musician. ...Khumalo has captured something of the infectious hedonism of the late 60's and early 70's."

His follow-up novel, 7 Steps to Heaven, was described as "a page-turner right to the very end", about which KZN Literary Tourism wrote: "Khumalo has presented South Africa with a book it has long needed; a humanistic tale about township culture that demonstrates an intimacy and sensitivity with the subject that gives it universal appeal. Challenging and intelligent as the book may be, what really makes it endearing is the sweetness of Khumalo's humour. It is a book you cannot help enjoying."

His 2011 memoir, Touch My Blood: The Early Years, was adapted by James Ngcobo into a stage production that opened at the Grahamstown National Arts Festival. A stage adaptation of his 2017 historical novel Dancing the Death Drill premiered in the UK at the Nuffield Theatre, Southampton, in 2018.

Khumalo has twice been shortlisted for the Commonwealth Short Story Prize, and among his other awards are the 2019 Humanities and Social Sciences Awards for Dancing the Death Drill, and the Nadine Gordimer Short Story Award for his 2019 collection Talk of the Town, for which the citation noted: "When a great storyteller and great plots intersect, that leads to magnanimous stories and incredible characters. In his debut short stories collection, the author weaves a number of themes that explicate contemporary topics in South African life. These are moving stories that will drive the reader to extremes of gaiety, disbelief and disgust. The author refuses to be time-bound and his stories look before and beyond apartheid South Africa. When you read them you are bound to pose questions whether you search for an identity or you question the foibles of society. Through these stories, the author examines a society that tries to define itself in exile and at home."

== Selected recognition and awards ==
- 1991: Runner-up for Nadine Gordimer Short Story Award runner-up
- 1996: Runner-up for Bertrams V.O Literature of Africa Award
- 2006: European Union Literary Award (for Bitches' Brew)
- 2007: Alan Paton Award (for Touch My Blood)
- 2015: Shortlisted for Commonwealth Short Story Prize (for "Legs of Thunder")
- 2017: Multilingualism Award (for #ZuptasMustFall)
- 2018: Shortlisted for Commonwealth Short Story Prize (for "Talk of the Town")
- 2019: Humanities and Social Sciences Awards (for Dancing the Death Drill)
- 2019: Nadine Gordimer Short Story Award (for Talk of the Town: Short stories)

== Bibliography ==
- Bitches' Brew (novel), Jacana Media, 2007, ISBN 9781770091900
- Seven Steps to Heaven (novel), Jacana Media, 2008, ISBN 9781770093874
- Zuma: The Biography of Jacob Zuma, Penguin Random House South Africa, 2008, ISBN 9780143025245
- Zulu Boy Gone Crazy: Hilarious Tales Post Polokwane, Sandton: KMM Review Publishing, 2010, ISBN 9780620448895
- Touch My Blood: The Early Years (autobiography), Penguin Random House South Africa, 2011, ISBN 9781415200049
- The Lighter Side of Life on Robben Island: Banter, pastimes and boyish tricks (with Paddy Harper and Gugu Kunene), Houghton: Makana, 2012, ISBN 9780620540353
- #ZuptasMustFall, and other rants, Penguin Random House South Africa, 2016, ISBN 9781776091072
- Dancing the Death Drill (novel), London: Jacaranda Books, 2017, ISBN 9781909762534
- Talk of the Town: Short stories, Kwela, 2019, ISBN 9780795708985
- The Longest March (non-fiction), Umuzi/Penguin Random House South Africa, 2019, ISBN 9781415210185
- A Coat of Many Colours (short stories), Kwela Books, 2021, ISBN 9780795710148
- Two Tons o' Fun (novel), Penguin Random House South Africa, 2022, ISBN 9781415210949

=== Selected shorter writings ===
- "On Writing", African Writing Online, December/January 2008.
- "I am not an African, no, I am 100% Zulu", The Sowetan, 2 September 2016.
- "Historical fiction is back – with fire in its belly", 10 May 2018.
- "Books and belonging—Fred Khumalo reflects on how James Hadley Chase and Alan Paton changed his life", The Johannesburg Review of Books, 1 October 2018.
- "Talk of the Town", adda, 5 October 2018.
- "The dominant narrative locks black people out of our figurative mansion", Sowetan Live, 18 October 2019.
