= Wole Soyinka Prize for Literature in Africa =

African literary prize

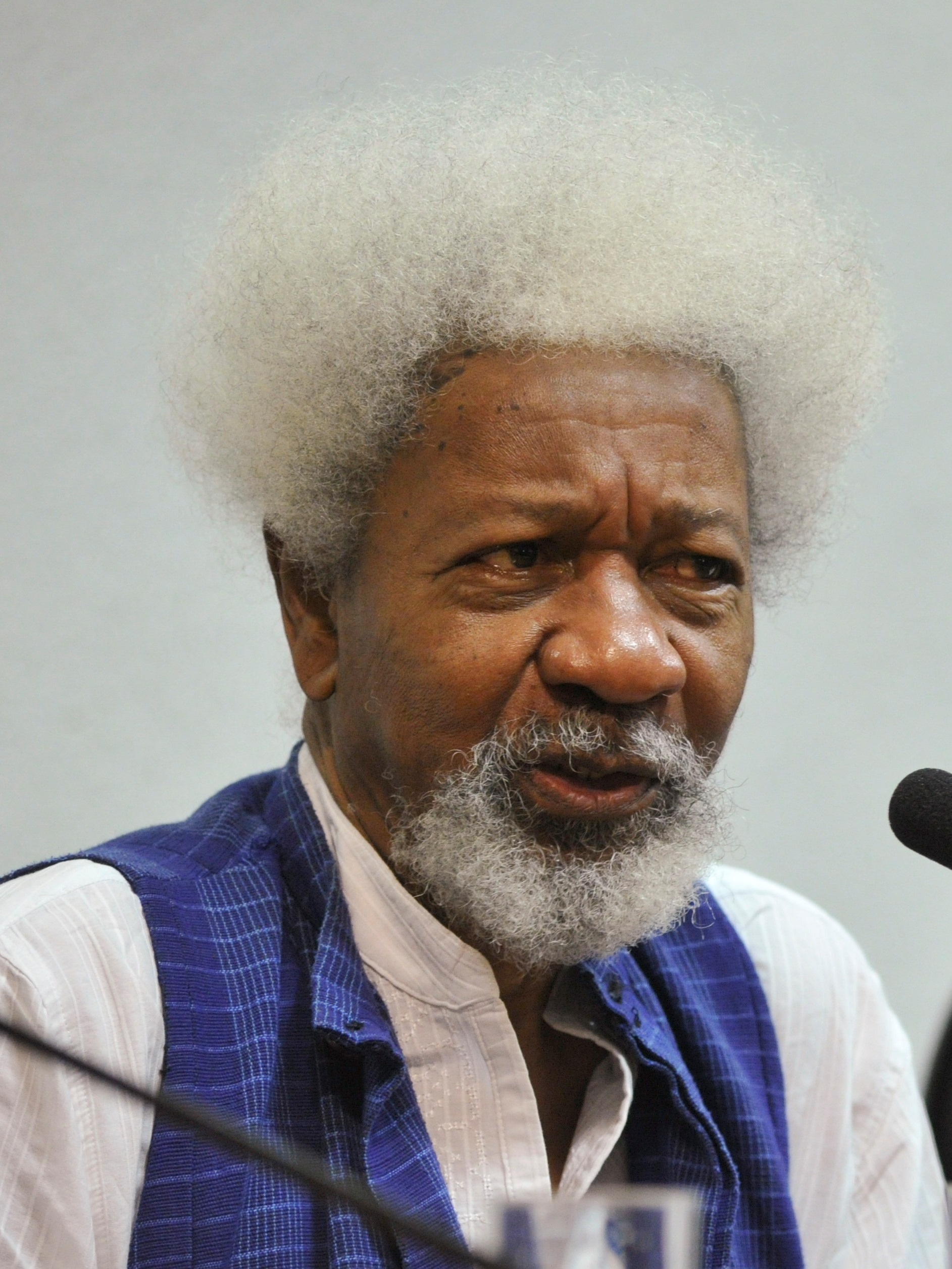
- Wole Soyinka
- Awarded for: Pan-African writing prize for books of any type or genre
- Sponsored by: The Lumina Foundation
- Country: Nigeria
- Hosted by: The Lumina Foundation
- Reward: $20,000
- First award: 2006
- Final award: 2018
- Website: theluminafoundation.org

Wole Soyinka Prize for Literature in Africa was a pan-African writing prize awarded biennially to the best literary work produced by an African. The $20,000 prize was established in 2005 and administered by the Lumina Foundation in honour of Africa's first Nobel Laureate in Literature, Wole Soyinka.

While no official statement has been made on the state of the prize, it has not been awarded since 2018. In June 2025, Nigerian businessman Olabode Opeseitan wrote an opinion piece in The Nation urging the governors of Lagos and Ogun states—where Soyinka resides and was born—to support funding for the prize.

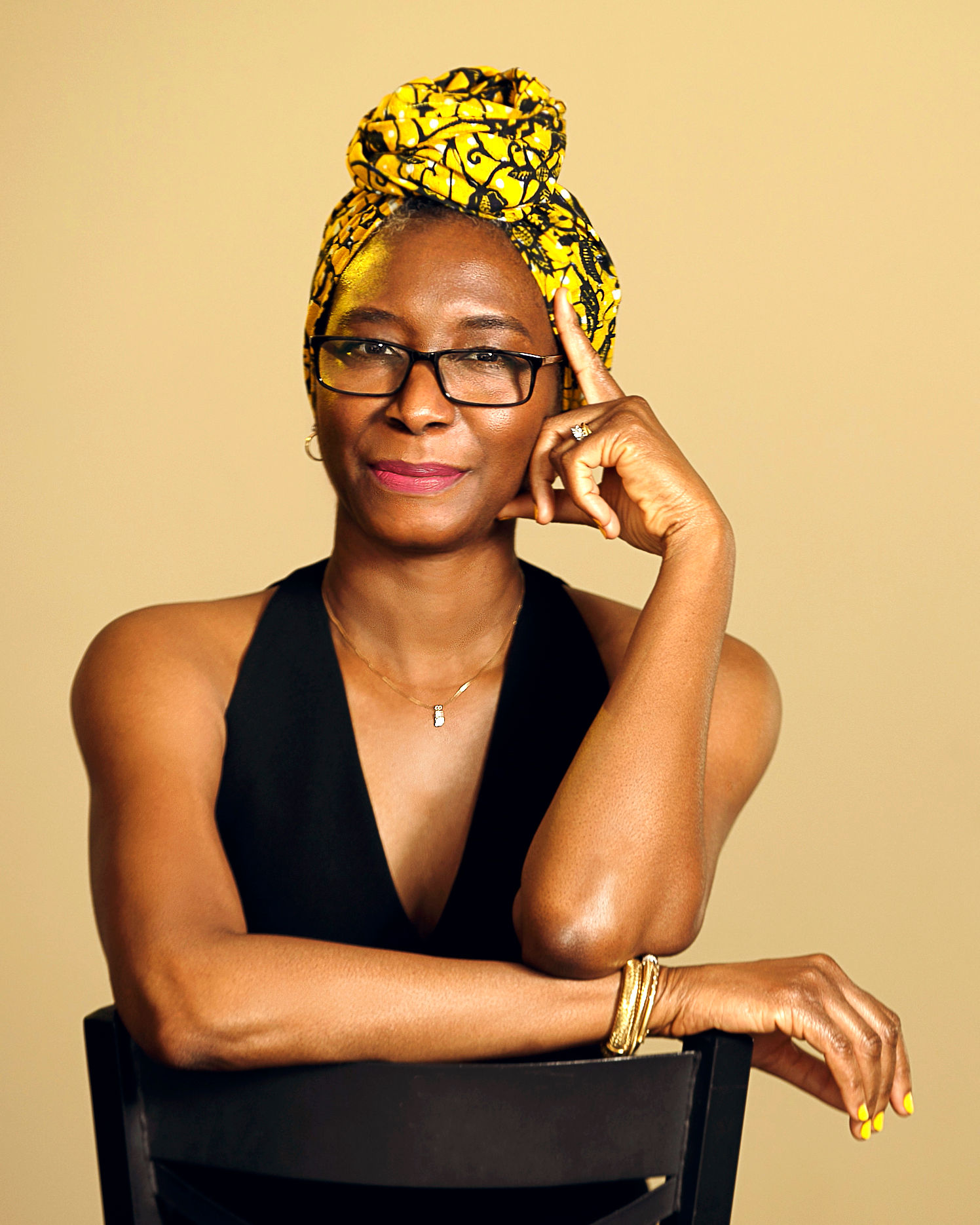
Sefi Atta, 2006 winner

On the establishment of the prize Soyinka commented: "This is a pan African prize. We consider it to be our own Nobel prize in Africa. It unifies Africans, celebrates Africa’s great minds, brings home Africa’s best intellectuals as judges, entertainers and great communicators and leaders in their own rights. It’s a book prize I am happy and proud to be part of because of the tribute it pays to profound knowledge generation and dissemination and to Africa’s diverse cultures and personalities."

The winner was chosen by an international jury of African literary figures and the prize was presented by Soyinka at an award dinner in Lagos. Entries had to be written in English or French. Initially any literary genre was eligible to be considered, but starting in 2014, a single genre was selected for each edition: drama in 2014, poetry in 2016, and prose in 2018.

Past sponsors included the Nigerian telco Glo which supported the prize for three years.

== Winners ==
- 2006: Sefi Atta, Everything Good Will Come. The inaugural award took place on 5 August 2006 at the Muson Centre, Lagos, Nigeria, where the guest speaker was former Ghana President John Agyekum Kufuor.
- 2008: Nnedi Okorafor, Zahrah the Windseeker
- 2010: (shared prize)
  - Kopano Matlwa, Coconut
  - Wale Okediran, Tenants of the House
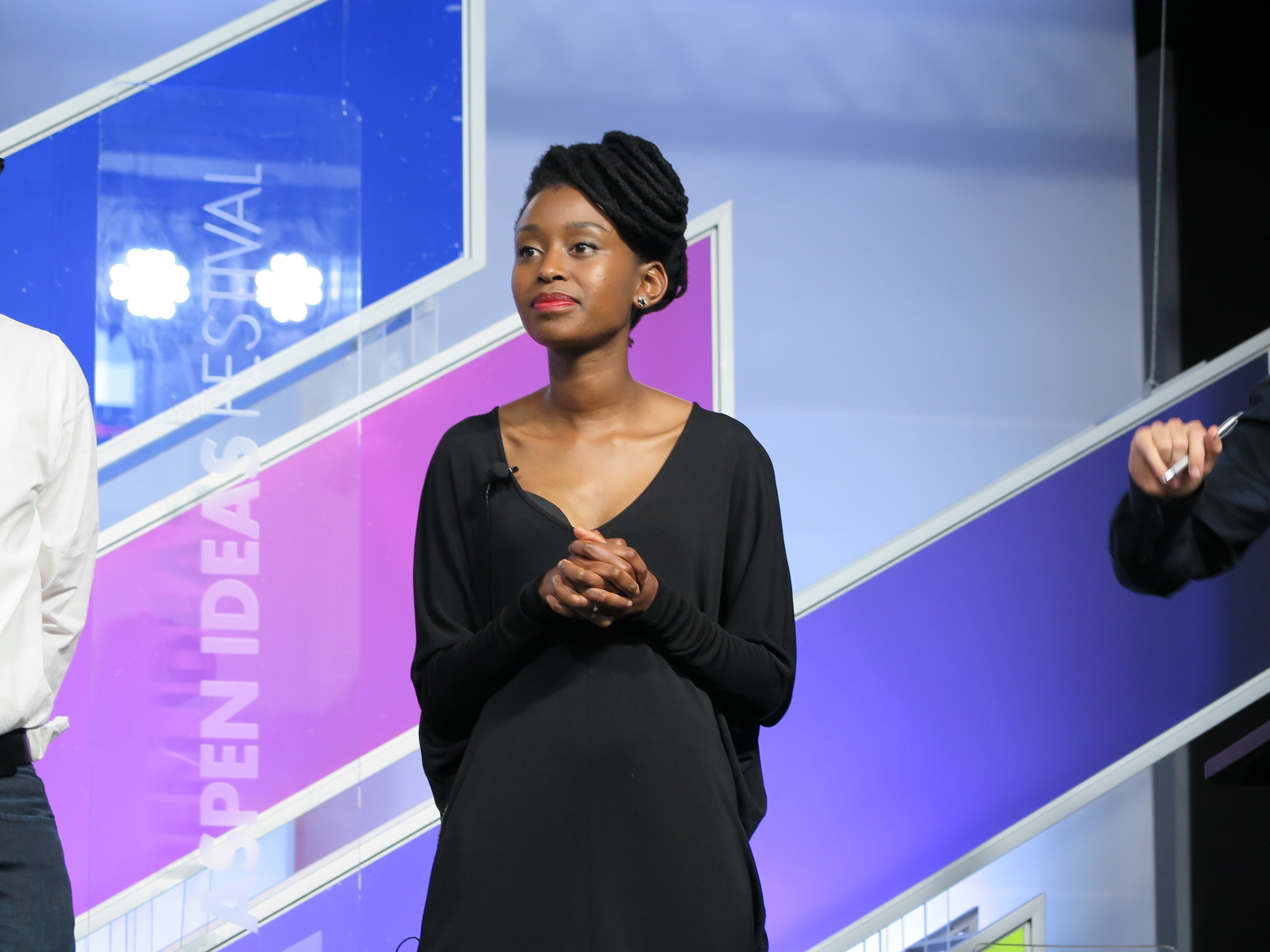
- Kopano Matlwa, 2010 winner
  2012: Sifiso Mzobe, Young Blood
- 2014: Akin Bello, The Egbon of Lagos (play)
- 2018: (shared prize)
  - Harriet Anena, A Nation in Labour
  - Tanure Ojaide, Songs of Myself

== See also ==
Grand Prix of Literary Associations
