= Efuru =

1966 novel by Flora Nwapa

- Early paperback edition cover
- Author: Flora Nwapa
- Language: English
- Genre: Feminist novel
- Publisher: William Heinemann
- Publication date: 1966; 60 years ago
- Publication place: Nigeria
- Media type: Print (hardback & paperback)
- Pages: 281 pp (paperback edition)
- ISBN: 0-435-90026-9 (paperback edition)
- OCLC: 27123737

Efuru is the debut novel by Flora Nwapa, which was published in 1966 as number 26 in Heinemann's African Writers Series, making it the first book written by a Nigerian woman, or any sub-Saharan African woman, to be published internationally. The novel is about Efuru, an Igbo woman who lives in a small village in colonial West Africa. Throughout the story, Efuru wishes to be a mother, though she is an independent-minded woman and respected for her trading ability. The book is rich in portrayals of the Igbo culture and of different scenarios, which have led to its current status as a feminist and cultural work.

== Plot summary ==
The story is set in West African Igbo rural community. The protagonist, Efuru, is a strong and beautiful woman. She is the daughter of Nwashike Ogene, a hero and leader of his tribe. She falls in love with a poor farmer called Adizua and runs away with him, upsetting her people because he did not even perform the traditional wine-carrying and paying her bride price. She supports her husband financially and is very loyal to him, which makes her mother-in-law and aunt by marriage very fond of her. At this point, she accepts to be helped around her house by a young girl named Ogea in order to help her parents who are in financial difficulty. However, Adizua soon abandons Efuru and their daughter Ogonim, as his own father had done in the past.

After her daughter dies, Efuru discovers that he has married another woman and had a child with her. Her in-laws try to convince her to stay with him, i.e. remain in waiting in their marital house. Efuru then tries to look for him, but after failing, she leaves his house and goes back to the house of her father, who receives her happily, since she can care for him better than others.

Efuru then meets Gilbert, an educated man in her age group. He asks to marry her and follows tradition by visiting her father, and she accepts. The first year of their marriage is a happy one. However, Efuru is unable to conceive any children, so this begins to cause trouble. She is later chosen by the goddess of the lake, Uhamiri, to be one of her worshippers. Uhamiri, being known to offer her worshippers wealth and beauty but few children. Efuru's second marriage eventually also fails, as her husband mistreats her in favour of his second and third wives.

== Characters in Efuru ==
- Efuru – The protagonist. Born into the highly respected Nwashike Family, Efuru is raised solely by her father, Nwashike Ogene. The novel portrays her as a beautiful, kind-hearted, strong-willed, understanding, clever, and relatively more free-spirited female character compared to the other female characters. In certain scenarios, Efuru does not follow the traditions of her people, for example, she marries Adizua although he cannot pay her dowry. However, she undergoes the customary circumcision although it is unsafe and painful. Overall, Efuru does not completely try to rebel against her society's constructs and mentality but slowly breaks away from what a reader of this century would deem as "anti-feminist" ideas.
- Nwashike Ogene – Efuru's father. He is a highly respected member of their society because of his own father, who fought against the Aro people, and also due to the fact that he was an excellent fisher and farmer, abilities valued among his people, when he was younger. He is praised for being wise and understanding but surprises people with how lenient he is with his daughter when she does not follow traditions. He gives up on trying to bring Efuru home after he is told that she is happy with Adizua and after the marriage falls apart, Nwashike Ogene still lets his daughter return home.
- Adizua – Efuru's first husband. He is portrayed as a lazy, irresponsible character unlike Efuru who is willing to continue her trade after only one month of “feasting”, i.e. eating in order to heal after her circumcision, because of the little money they had. He is deemed unworthy to marry Efuru because of his unknown father who did not achieve anything to bring honor to the family. Within this context, he becomes even less worthy when he eventually elopes with another woman. He does not even return for their daughter's funeral. Efuru eventually leaves him although it is customary to wait for the return of the wrongdoing husband.
- Ajanapu – Adizua's aunt and Efuru's aunt-in-law. A sensitive, strong, and talkative mother of seven who acts as a mother-figure to Efuru. Throughout the story, Ajanupu does not hesitate to give advice and a majority of the time her advice is helpful to Efuru. The author comments on how she could be a midwife, which is convincing, because of the clear expertise she shows when it is Efuru's time to deliver her baby.
- Ossai – Adizua's mother and Efuru's mother-in-law. Her quiet and reserved persona is most noticeable when she is with her sister, Ajanupu, showing readers the contrast between the two. Although her son does not follow pre-marital customs, she treats Efuru well.
- Nwosu – Ossai's cousin. He is known as a great farmer but the flood ruins his harvest, causing him to fall into debt and to beg Efuru to take his daughter, Ogea as a maid and borrow ten pounds. He and his wife have trouble paying back the ten pounds but Efuru's patient character prevents any tension to form among them.
- Nwabata – Ogea's mother. She is an uneducated, hardworking farmer who works with her husband on their rented plot of land. Her love for her husband and ignorance become apparent when she cried after she heard that her husband needed surgery.
- Ogea – Efuru's maid, Nwabata and Nwosu's daughter. She started living and working at Efuru's house at the age of ten. Ogea helps Efuru take care of Ogonim, resulting in a deep bond between the characters, which is why Ogea's reaction to Ogonim's passing is justified despite how the present side-characters at the funeral told her to stop.
- Ogonim – Efuru's firstborn daughter. A healthy baby girl until the age of two, when she becomes ill and dies.
- Gilbert – He is Efuru's childhood friend and, later on, her second husband. His Igbo name is Enerberi but it changed to Gilbert after he was baptized. He is one of the few characters to receive an education, although he had to stop at standard five due to a lack of funds .
- Amede – Gilbert's mother. A neutral and quiet character who happily accepts Efuru as her daughter-in-law.
- Omirima – One of the women who criticizes Gilbert and Efuru's public displays of affection, pointing them out to Amede. In fact, she seems to be the main source of gossip in the novel.
- Dr Uzaru – Efuru lived with Dr. Uzaru and his mother until the age of fifteen. He treats Nwosu and Nnona under Efuru's request.
- Nkoyeni – She is Gilbert friend's sister whom he knows since childhood. She later becomes his second wife and has a baby boy.
- Nnona – The gate-woman with an infected leg. Efuru helps her by arranging an appointment with Dr. Uzaru. Later, she receives surgery and made a full recovery.

== Reception and controversy ==
The novel Efuru is recognized as a substantial stepping stone in Nigerian literature and in the feminist movement in Nigeria, for it was “the first novel published by a Nigerian woman in English.” As a result, Nwapa was awarded the Nigerian chieftaincy title Ogbuefi, which translates into “killer of cow”. This title is of high importance, for it is usually acquired by men. Furthermore, Nwapa gained even more recognition for her work, as the Nigerian government granted her several prestigious awards after Efuru was released.

Efuru received mixed reviews on its first publication. For instance, Kenyan author Grace Ogot spoke positively of the novel in a review that appeared in the East Africa Journal in 1966, stating that "of the many novels that are coming out of Nigeria, Efuru is one of the few that portrays vividly the woman's world, giving only peripheral treatment to the affairs of men." Nwapa's male counterparts, however, were less fond of the book. Literary critic Eldred Jones and author Eustace Palmer both represent the opinion of some Nigerian male writers at the time, most of whom criticize Nwapa for focusing on the affairs of women. Later critics of Efuru, however, commend Nwapa for creating an image of female protagonists unlike that created by Nigerian male writers. Author Rose Acholonu describes Nwapa and certain other African female writers as "pathfinders", who were able to "break the seals of silence and invisibility on the female protagonist by the early traditionalist male writers". Christine N. Ohale, a professor at the department of English, Communications, Media Arts and Theater in Chicago State University, mentions that Nwapa's "efforts to present brand-new, assertive and individualistic females have helped to salvage the lop-sided image that male writers have created", which is mainly one of passiveness.

Furthermore, critics such as Naana Banyiwe-Horne praise the use of dialogue as a stylistic element of the novel; in discussing Efuru, Banyiwe-Horne states: "The constant banter of women reveals character as much as it paints a comprehensive, credible, social canvas against which Efuru's life can be assessed." Many reviewers of the novel agree that the "dialogic style established in Efuru is even more central to the novel’s thematic concerns". Through the dialogue that Nwapa uses, she is able to paint an accurate picture of what life for Igbo women is like. Critics such as Christine Loflin point out that the use of dialogue in Efuru allows a sense of African feminism to emerge, free of Western imposed values. Other critics, however, reprimand the excessive use of dialogue, considering the novel too "gossipy".
