= Ishtiyaq Shukri =

Ishtiyaq Shukri is a South African writer, author of the novels The Silent Minaret and I See You. The Silent Minaret was the first book to receive the European Union Literary Award, in 2004.

== Career ==
Shukri's writing career was launched in 2004, when his unpublished manuscript, The Silent Minaret, won the European Union Literary Award. The novel, which deals with the global impact of the "War on Terror," was inspired by the announcement of the War in Afghanistan in November 2001. His second novel, I See You, expands on the themes established in The Silent Minaret, with conflict centering on an abducted war photographer. He has said he hopes his writing complicates people's notions of "boil-in-the-bag recipes for ready-to-eat patriotism."

In 2015, Shukri was nominated for the inaugural Financial Times Oppenheimer Funds Emerging Voices Awards, but rejected the award. Shukri stated he objected to the classification of "emergent," which is often applied to African writers, and belittles the global impact of African literature, Shukri said.

Shukri cites Edward Said and his memoir Out of Place, and T.E. Lawrence's Seven Pillars of Wisdom as some of his greatest influences.

== Personal life ==
Shukri has been a permanent resident of the United Kingdom since 1997. His wife is a British citizen. The couple have been married since 1996.

In July 2015, Shukri was detained by United Kingdom border officials at Heathrow, before being deported. Shukri was traveling to visit his wife. He said the deportation was a sign of "the increasing heavy-handedness facing African migrants at UK and EU borders." In 2018 Shukri wrote an open letter to Archbishop Desmond Tutu in which he addresses Tutu’s recent stepping down as an ambassador for Oxfam after the sex scandal that rocked the international charity. In the letter, Shukri states that he himself is a survivor of child sexual abuse by priests from the Church of England, and asks why ‘the Archbishop has never fully addressed such systematic and institutionalised sexual abuse happening in his own organisation’. In 2021 Shukri Shukri published a longer piece on this subject in which he named the priests who abused him as Roy Snyman and Keith Thomas.

== Books ==
- The Silent Minaret (Jacana, 2007) ISBN 1770092498
- I See You (Jacana, 2015) ISBN 9781431408757
