= Tanure Ojaide =

Nigerian poet and academic (born 1948)

- Born: 1948 (age 77–78); Nigeria
- Citizenship: Nigeria
- Education: University of Ibadan; Syracuse University
- Occupations: Poet, academic
- Notable work: Songs of Myself: A Quartet (2017)
- Awards: 2018 Wole Soyinka Prize for Literature in Africa

Tanure Ojaide (born 1948) is a Nigerian poet and academic. As a writer, he is noted for his unique stylistic vision and for his intense criticism of imperialism, religion, and other issues. He is regarded as a socio-political and an ecocentric poet. He won the 2018 Wole Soyinka Prize for Literature in Africa with his collection Songs of Myself: A Quartet (2017).

== Biography ==
Tanure Ojaide was born to Urhobo parents from Okpara Inland in Agbon Kingdom of Delta State. He credits his grandmother with having inspired his writing. He attended secondary school at Obinomba and Federal Government College, Warri, before proceeding to the University of Ibadan for his degree program in English. He attended Syracuse University, where he earned an M.A. in Creative Writing and a PhD in English. He later taught at the University of Maiduguri, before being appointed as the Frank Porter Graham Professor at the University of North Carolina at Charlotte. He has been a visiting scholar and has taught at several universities across the world, including at Delta State University, Abraka, and Kwara State University, Malete. His poetry is widely read and he is known for the infusion of Urhobo folklore and Udje aesthetics in his poetry.

== Awards ==
Ojaide has won major national and international poetry awards, including the Commonwealth Poetry Prize for the Africa region (1987), the BBC Arts and Africa Poetry Award (1988), the All-Africa Okigbo Prize for Poetry (1988 and 1997), the Association of Nigerian Authors' Poetry Prize (1988, 1994, 2003 and 2011) and the Fonlon-Nichols Award.

In 2016, Ojaide won the Nigerian National Order of Merit award, the apex and the most important award for scholastic excellence in Nigeria.

In 2017, his poetry collection, Songs of Myself: A Quartet, was the second runner-up in the NLNG Prize for Literature. Three conferences have also been convened in his honour. The most recent one was held from 2 to 5 May 2018 at the University of Port Harcourt.

Songs of Myself was shortlisted for the biennial Wole Soyinka Prize for Literature in Africa, alongside collections by Harriet Anena and Servio Gbadamosi, and on 9 December 2018, at an award ceremony held in Lagos, Ojaide and Anena were announced as joint winners, chosen by judges Toyin Falola, Olu Obafemi and Margaret Busby, the presentation being made by Professor Wole Soyinka.

== Bibliography ==
=== Poem ===
- To Those Who Love Me (Ibadan: Bookcraft, 2022)
- Narrow Escapes: A Poetic Diary of the Coronavirus Pandemic (Lakewood: Spears Media, 2021)
- The Questioner (Ibadan: Kraft Books, 2018)
- Songs of Myself: A Quartet (Ibadan: Kraft Books, 2015)
- Love Gifts (Lagos: African Heritage Press, 2013)
- The Beauty I Have Seen (Lagos: Malthouse, 2010)
- Waiting for the Hatching of a Cockerel (Trenton, NJ: Africa World Press, 2008)
- The Tale of the Harmattan (Cape Town: Kwela Books, 2007)
- In the House of Words (Lagos: Malthouse Press Ltd, 2005)
- I Want to Dance and Other Poems (San Francisco: African Heritage Press, 2003)
- In the Kingdom of Songs (Trenton, NJ: Africa World Press, 2002).
- Invoking the Warrior Spirit: New and Selected Poems (Trenton, NJ: Africa World Press, 2000).
- When It No Longer Matters Where You Live (Calabar, Nig.: University of Calabar Press, 1999).
- Invoking the Warrior Spirit (Ibadan: Heinemann, 1999).
- Delta Blues and Home Songs (Ibadan: Kraft Books, 1998).
- Daydream of Ants (Lagos: Malthouse, 1997).
- The Blood of Peace (Oxford, UK: Heinemann, 1991).
- The Fate of Vultures (Lagos: Malthouse, 1990).
- Poems (Rotterdam, The Netherlands: Poetry International, 1988).
- The Endless Song (Lagos: Malthouse, 1988).
- The Eagle's Vision (Detroit: Lotus, 1987).
- Labyrinths of the Delta (New York: Greenfield Review Press, 1986).
- Children of Iroko & Other Poems (New York: Greenfield Review Press, 1973).

=== Anthology ===
- Ghost Fishing: An Eco-Justice Poetry Anthology (University of Georgia Press, 2018).

=== Fiction ===
- God's Naked Children (Lagos: Malthouse, 2018)
- Stars of the Long Night (Lagos: Malthouse, 2012).
- The Old Man in a State House & Other Stories (Lagos: African Heritage Press, 2012).
- Matters of the Moment (Lagos: Malthouse, 2009).
- The Debt-Collector and Other Stories (Trenton, NJ: Africa World Press, 2009).
- The Activist (A Novel) (Lagos: Farafina Publications, 2006).
- Sovereign Body (A Novel) (Spring, TX: Panther Creek Press, 2004).
- God’s Medicine Men and Other Stories (Lagos, Nigeria: Malthouse, 2004)

=== Non-fiction ===
- Drawing the Map of Heaven: An African Writer in America (Lagos: Malthouse Press, 2012).
- Great Boys: An African Childhood (Trenton, NJ: Africa World Press, 1998). A memoir
