= Prehistory of Northern Nigeria =

The pre-history of Northern Nigeria spans the period covering from the early history of the planet to the time of written historical records. There has been very little investigation into the History of Northern Nigeria before the rise of human civilisation.

== Stone Age ==
The Dufuna canoe was discovered in 1987 a few kilometers from the village of Dufuna, not far from the Komadugu Gana River, in Yobe State, Nigeria. Radiocarbon dating of a sample of charcoal found near the site dates the canoe at 8500 to 8000 years old, linking the site to Lake Mega Chad. It is the oldest boat to be discovered in Africa, and the second oldest known worldwide.

== Iron Age ==
Kainji Dam excavations revealed ironworking by the 2nd century BC. The transition from Neolithic times to the Iron Age apparently was achieved without intermediate bronze production. Others suggest the technology moved west from the Nile Valley, although the Iron Age in the Niger River valley and the forest region appears to predate the introduction of metallurgy in the upper savanna by more than 800 years.

== Nok Culture ==
The Nok culture thrived from approximately 1,500 BC to about 200 AD on the Jos Plateau in north and central Nigeria and produced life-sized terracotta figures that include human heads, human figures, and animals. Iron smelting furnaces at Taruga, a Nok site, date from around 600 BC. The Nok culture is thought to have begun smelting iron by 600-500 BC and possibly some centuries earlier.
