= Gerald Kraak =

South African activist (1956–2014)

- Born: South Africa
- Died: October 19, 2014 (aged 57–58)
- Occupation: Human rights activist

Gerald Kraak (1956–2014) was a South African human rights activist best known for mobilizing funding for civil rights organisations. He was also a prominent supporter of the South African LGBTQ rights movement.

Following his death, the Other Foundation founded by him and the Jacana Literary Foundation established the Gerald Kraak Gerald Kraak Prize for Writing and Photography of African Perspectives on Gender, Social Justice, and Sexuality in his honor.

== Biography ==
Kraak was born in South Africa to a Dutch father. He attended Westerford High School in Cape Town. There, he joined the student organisation National Youth Action. After graduating, he went on to the University of Cape Town, where he studied history. While at university, "his involvement in anti-apartheid, leftist politics and student activism intensified". He was a member of the National Union of South African Students (NUSAS) beginning in 1975, becoming their National Media Officer in 1978. Kraak later noted that although many of his fellow executive officers were gay or lesbian, although this was not discussed or otherwise acknowledged. He was also a member of the UCT Students’ Representative Council (SRC), and Students for Social Democracy. Kraak received military conscription orders, which he refused as a conscientious objector. In 1979, under threat of conscription, he left the country for the Netherlands. He lived in Europe for the next 13 years.

In the 1980s and 1990s, Kraak worked for the International Defence and Aid Fund in London. In the early 2000s, he joined the South African office of Atlantic Philanthropies, and later served as a "Programme Executive for Atlantic’s Reconciliation & Human Rights Programme".

Kraak was involved in the anti-apartheid movement and supported white South Africans who were conscripted into the apartheid military. He also worked to promote democracy in South Africa and was active in numerous civil rights organizations, including the Gay and Lesbian Organisation of the Witwatersrand, the AIDS Law Project, the National Coalition for Gay and Lesbian Equality, and the Gay and Lesbian Archives.

His 2006 novel, Ice in the Lungs, explored gay culture during apartheid. The novel won the EU Literary Award.

Kraak was gay. He died from cancer on October 19, 2014. He bequeathed a "substantial personal collection" to the GALA Queer Archive.

== Gerald Kraak Award and anthology ==
The award was established in honour of Gerald Kraak and recognizes writing and photography that explore themes of gender, human rights, and sexuality by writers and photographers living in Africa. Shortlisted works are published by Jacana Media in South Africa, alongside publishing partners such as Amalion Publishing and others.

Notable winners and shortlists include Farah Ahamed (Kenya), Sarah Waiswa (Kenya), Pwaangulongii Dauod (Nigeria), OluTimehin Adegbeye (Nigeria), Roy Udeh-Ubaka (Nigeria), Chukwuebuka Ibeh (Nigeria), Chike Frankie Edozien (Nigeria), Ukamaka Olisakwe (Nigeria), Caleb Okereke (Nigera), Idza Luhumhyo (Kenya), Megan Ross (South Africa) and others.

== Bibliography ==
=== Books ===
- Breaking the Chains: Labour in South Africa in the 1970s and 1980s. London: Pluto Press. 1993. ISBN 0-7453-0705-1.
- Ice in the Lungs. Jacana Media. 2006. ISBN 978-1-77009-228-0.
- Shadow Play. Jacana Media. 2017. ISBN 9781431425075.; posthumously completed by Alison Lowry

=== Essays ===
- Hoad, Neville Wallace; Martin, Karen; Reid, Graeme, eds. (2005). "Homosexuality and the South African left: The ambiguities of exile". Sex and Politics in South Africa. Juta and Company Ltd. ISBN 978-1-77013-015-9.
