= Flora Nwapa =

Nigerian writer and publisher (1931–1993)

Chief Flora Nwapa
- Born: Florence Nwanzuruahu Nkiru Nwapa; 13 January 1931; Oguta, Nigeria
- Died: 16 October 1993 (aged 62); Enugu, Nigeria
- Education: University College, Ibadan; Edinburgh University
- Occupations: Author and publisher
- Spouse: Chief Gogo Nwakuche
- Children: 3
- Writing career
- Genres: Novels; short stories; poems; plays
- Notable works: Efuru (1966); Idu (1970); This Is Lagos and Other Stories (1971)

Chief Florence Nwanzuruahu Nkiru Nwapa (13 January 1931 – 16 October 1993), was a Nigerian author who has been called the mother of modern African Literature. She was the forerunner to a generation of African women writers, and the first African woman novelist to be published in the English language in Britain. She achieved international recognition with her first novel Efuru, published in 1966 by Heinemann Educational Books. While never considering herself a feminist, she was best known for recreating life and traditions from an Igbo woman's viewpoint. She was herself a chief of the tribe, holding the otherwise exclusively male title Ogbuefi amongst them.

She published African literature and promoted women in African society. She was one of the first African women publishers when she founded Tana Press in Nigeria in 1970. Nwapa engaged in governmental work in reconstruction after the Biafran War; in particular, she worked with orphans and refugees who were displaced during the war.

== Biography ==
=== Early years and education ===
Nwapa was born in Oguta Local Government Area of Imo State, in south-eastern part of Nigeria, the eldest of the six children of Christopher Ijeoma (an agent with the United Africa Company) and Martha Nwapa, a teacher of drama. Flora Nwapa attended school in Oguta, Secondary School at Elelenwo in Obio Akpor LGA of Rivers State, south-south Nigeria and CMS Girls School, Lagos State, which later moved to Ibadan to merge with Kudeti Girls School and was renamed St Anne's School Ibadan. In 1953, when she was 22 years old, she attended university and in 1957, at the age of 26, earned a B.A. degree from University College, Ibadan in Oyo State, southwest Nigeria. She then went to Scotland, where she earned a Diploma in Education from Edinburgh University in 1958.

=== Family life ===
Flora Nwapa had three children: Ejine Nzeribe (from her previous relationship), Uzoma Gogo Nwakuche and Amede Nzeribe. She was married to Chief Gogo Nwakuche.

Her uncle, A. C. Nwapa, was Nigeria's first Minister of Commerce and Industries, according to The House of Nwapa, the documentary by Onyeka Nwelue. Nwapa is a cousin of Nigerian author Adaobi Tricia Nwaubani.

=== Teaching and public service ===
After returning to Nigeria, Nwapa joined the Ministry of Education in Calabar as an Education Officer until 1959. She then took employment as a teacher at Queen's School in Enugu, where she taught English and Geography from 1959 to 1962. She continued to work in both education and the civil service in several positions, including as Assistant Registrar, University of Lagos (1962–1967). After the Nigerian Civil War of 1967–1970, she accepted cabinet office as Minister of Health and Social Welfare in East Central State (1970–71), and subsequently as Minister of Lands, Survey and Urban Development (1971–74). She was a visiting lecturer at Alvan Ikoku Federal College of Education in Owerri, Nigeria. In 1989, she was appointed a visiting professor of creative writing at University of Maiduguri.

=== Writing and publishing ===
Nwapa's first book, Efuru, was published in 1966 when she was 30 years old, and is considered a pioneering work as an English-Language novel by an African woman writer. She sent the transcript to the famous Nigerian author Chinua Achebe in 1962, who replied with a very positive letter and even included money for the postage to mail the manuscript to the English publisher, Heinemann.

Nwapa followed Efuru with the novels such as Idu (1970), Never Again (1975), One is Enough (1981), and Women are Different (1986). She published two collections of stories – This is Lagos (1971) and Wives at War (1980) – and the volume of poems, Cassava Song and Rice Song (1986). She is also the author of several books for children.

In the year 1974, she founded Tana Press, and in 1977 the Flora Nwapa Company, publishing her own adult and children's literature as well as works by other writers. She gave as one of her objectives: "to inform and educate women all over the world, especially Feminists (both with capital F and small f) about the role of women in Nigeria, their economic independence, their relationship with their husbands and children, their traditional beliefs and their status in the community as a whole". Tana has been described as "the first press run by a woman and targeted at a large female audience. A project far beyond its time at a period when no one saw African women as constituting a community of readers or a book-buying demographic."

At the beginning of Nwapa's literary career, as a result of the way feminism was viewed and the way it was portrayed, she had no interest in feminism because she felt it was prejudiced against men, but she eventually came to terms with it. However, her struggle with feminism is representative of the present conversations about the movement in Africa and the world at large.

Her work appeared in publications ranging from the magazines Présence Africaine and Black Orpheus, in the 1960s and '70s, to the 1992 anthology Daughters of Africa, edited by Margaret Busby.

=== Later years ===
Nwapa's career as an educator continued throughout her life and encompassed teaching at colleges and universities internationally, including at New York University, Trinity College, the University of Minnesota, the University of Michigan and the University of Ilorin. She said in an interview with Contemporary Authors: "I have been writing for nearly thirty years. My interest has been on both the rural and the urban woman in her quest for survival in a fast-changing world dominated by men."

Flora Nwapa died of pneumonia on 16 October 1993 at a hospital in Enugu, Nigeria, at the age of 62. Her final novel, The Lake Goddess, was posthumously published.

== Selected bibliography ==
Novels

- Efuru, Heinemann Educational Books, 1966; Waveland Press, 2013, ISBN 9781478613275
- Idu, Heinemann African Writers Series, No. 56, ISBN 0-435-90056-0; 1970
- Never Again, Enugu: Tana Press, 1975; Nwamife, 1976; Africa World Press, 1992, ISBN 9780865433182
- One Is Enough, Enugu: Flora Nwapa Co., 1981; Tana Press, 1984; Africa World Press, 1992, ISBN 9780865433229
- Women are Different, Enugu: Tana Press, 1986; Africa World Press, 1992, ISBN 9780865433267
- The Lake Goddess, Lawrenceville, NJ: Africa World Press, 1995

Short stories/poems

- This Is Lagos and Other Stories, Enugu: Nwamife, 1971; Africa World Press, 1992, ISBN 9780865433212
- Wives at War and Other Stories, Enugu: Nwamife, 1980; Flora Nwapa Co./Tana Press, 1984; Africa World Press, 1992, ISBN 9780865433281
- Cassava Song and Rice Song, Enugu: Tana Press, 1986

Children's books

- Emeka, Driver's Guard, London: University of London Press, 1972; Enugu: Flora Nwapa Company, 1987
- Mammywater, 1979; Enugu: Flora Nwapa Company, 1984
- The Adventures of Deke, Enugu: Flora Nwapa Co., 1980
- The Miracle Kittens, Enugu: Flora Nwapa Company, 1980
- Journey to Space, Enugu: Flora Nwapa Company, 1980

== Legacy ==
Flora Nwapa is the subject of a documentary entitled The House of Nwapa, made by Onyeka Nwelue, that premiered in August 2016.

On 13 January 2017, Nwapa's birthday was marked with a Google Doodle.

Nwapa's son, Uzoma Gogo Nwakuche, founded the Flora Nwapa Foundation, a California non-profit corporation, in 1994 following the death of his mother in 1993. The Flora Nwapa Foundation celebrated Efuru@50 in 2016.

== See also ==
- Buchi Emecheta
- Margaret Busby
