= Interlink Publishing =

American publishing house

- Founded: 1987
- Founder: Michel Moushabeck
- Country of origin: United States
- Headquarters location: Northampton, Massachusetts
- Distribution: Simon & Schuster; Parkway Sales (Middle East and North Africa)
- Publication types: Books
- Imprints: Interlink Books; Cadogan Guides, USA; Olive Branch Press; Clockroot Books; Crocodile Books, USA
- Official website: www.interlinkbooks.com

Interlink Publishing is an independent publishing house, founded in 1987 and based in Northampton, Massachusetts, USA. As of 2006, it published an average of 90 books a year and had 800 titles in print.

== Overview ==
The company specializes in publishing in the following subject areas:

- World travel
- World literature (Interlink World Fiction series)
- World history and politics
- Art
- World music and dance
- International cooking (including vegetarian)
- Children's books from around the world.

Many of its books concern Celtic culture. It also publishes series entitled On-the-Road Histories, International Folk Tales, Illustrated History, and Emerging Voices New International Fiction.

The company publishes under five imprints:

- Interlink Books
- Cadogan Guides, USA
- Olive Branch Press: "socially and politically relevant non-fiction", with an emphasis on non-Western material
- Clockroot Books
- Crocodile Books, USA: illustrated books from around the world for children aged 3–8
