= Rasaq Malik =

Nigerian poet and essayist

- Born: Rasaq Malik Gbolahan; 1992 (age 33–34); Iseyin, Oyo State, Nigeria
- Education: University of Ibadan
- Writing career
- Language: English, Yoruba
- Genres: Poetry; Essay

Rasaq Malik Gbolahan (born on December 30,1992) is a Nigerian poet and essayist. He is the author of several poetry collections including "The Origin of Wounds," "No Home in This Land” and “The Other Names of Grief”. With Ọ̀rẹ́dọlá Ibrahim, Malik is the co-founder of Àtẹ́lẹwọ́, the first digital journal devoted to publishing works written in the Yorùbá language.

== Education ==
Malik earned his bachelor's and master's degrees in English Language at the University of Ibadan, Nigeria in 2013 and 2017, respectively. Malik is currently completing his doctoral study in literary and cultural studies in the Department of English at the University of Nebraska–Lincoln.

== Works ==
Malik is the author of two poetry chapbooks: No Home In This Land, which was selected for a chapbook box edited by Kwame Dawes and Chris Abani in 2018, and The Other Names of Grief, published in 2021 by Konya Shamsrumi, an African poetry press which he formed with four other Nigerian poets in November 2017.

His poems, which often come off as dirges, threnodies, elegies and such other melancholic typologies of poetry, have attracted wide reviews on different literary platforms, including Open Country Mag, Olongo Africa, and African Writer Magazine, Qwenu! and in national dailies for example Daily Trust, TheCable Lifestyle.

Malik's poems have appeared in many literary journals and mediums, including the African American Review, Colorado Review, the Crab Orchard Review, LitHub, the Michigan Quarterly Review, The Minnesota Review, the New Orleans Review, the Prairie Schooner, Poet Lore, Rattle, Verse Daily, among several others. His essays have also been published in mediums such as Olongo Africa and Agbowó.

Rasaq was one of 126 established and emerging African poets who contributed to Wreaths for a Wayfarer, an anthology mourning the death of Nigerian-Canadian academic and public intellectual Pius Adesanmi in a March 2019 Ethiopian Airlines plane crash. He, alongside 31 other poets, also contributed to Sọ̀rọ̀sókè: An #EndSARS Anthology, edited by Nigerian writers Jumoke Verissimo and James Yeku. Published in February 2022, the collection memorialized the End SARS protests against police brutality in Nigeria.

Malik has been profiled and or interviewed on platforms and presses including The Nigerian Tribune, The Shallow Tales Review, CỌ́N-SCÌÒ Magazine, Africa in Dialogue and Gainsayer.

== Awards and acclaims ==
In August 2026, Malik's debut collection titled "The Origin of Wounds" (Anhinga Press) earned him the 2026 Julie Suk Award for the best poetry book published by a literary press. The anthology also made the 2026 Nigeria Prize for Literature Longlist along with the works of 10 other Nigerian poets including Saddiq Dzukogi, Adedayo Agarau, Tanure Ojaide, Ogaga Ifowodo and Theresa Lola. Earlier, the collection's manuscript was awarded the 2024 Anhinga Poetry Prize. He also received the 2024 Digital Humanities Summer Fellowships of the University of Nebraska–Lincoln's Center for Digital Research in the Humanities to translate selected English poems of African women poets published in online literary magazines and in print into Yoruba language to be published on Àtẹ́lẹwọ́.

Malik received Honorable Mention in 2015 Best of the Net for his poem "Elegy", published in One. Rattle nominated his poems "How My Mother Spends Her Nights" and "What My Children Remember" for the Pushcart Prize in 2016 and 2019, respectively. He was shortlisted for Brunel International African Poetry Prize in 2017. He was a finalist for Sillerman First Book for African Poets in 2018.

Malik regularly shares his work on his social media handles.
