= 2017 Nigeria Prize for Literature =

Nigerian literary award given in 2017

- Date: 10 October 2017
- Location: Lagos
- Country: Nigeria

The 2017 Nigeria Prize for Literature is a literary award worth US$100,000 given for the best English-language novel published by a Nigerian author. The winner, Ikeogu Oke for his poetry book The Heresiad, was announced on 10 October 2017 in Lagos.

Focused on poetry, the jury consisted of Ernest Emenyonu, the chairman, Tade Ipadeola, the 2013 recipient, and Razinat Mohammed. On 22 July 2017, 11 books were longlisted out of 184 entries.

On 30 August 2017, the shortlist was released and it contained only three books; Songs of Myself by Tanure Ojaide, A Good Mourning by Ogaga Ifowodo and The Heresiad by Ikeogu Oke. On 10 October 2017, chairman of the advisory board of the prize, Ayo Banjo, during the World Press Conference in Lagos announced Ikeogu Oke as the winner.

== Nominees ==
indicates the winner
indicates shortlisted

Author	Title	Publisher
Tanure Ojaide	Songs of Myself	
Peter Akinlabi	Iconography	
Hyginus Ekwuazi	One Day I’ll Dare to Raise My Middle Finger at the Stork and the Reaper	
Obari Gomba	For Every Homeland	
Seun Lari-Williams	Garri for Breakfast	
Humphrey Ogu	Echoes of Neglect	
Abubakar Othman	Blood Streams in the Desert	
Ikeogu Oke	The Heresiad	Kraft Books
Jumoke Verissimo	The Birth of Illusion	
Ebi Yeibo	Of Waters and the Wild	
Ogaga Ifowodo	A Good Mourning	

== See also ==
- List of winners and nominated authors of the Nigerian Prize for Literature
