= 2026 Nigeria Prize for Literature =

- Date: 10 October 2025
- Venue: Eko Hotels and Suites, Lagos
- Country: Nigeria

The 2026 Nigeria Prize for Literature is a literary award worth US$100,000 given for the best English-language novel published by a Nigerian author. The winner, Ogaga Ifowodo for her novel Why Does God Need a Gun?, was announced on 9 October 2025 at Eko Hotels and Suites in Lagos.

Focused on poetry, there were 223 entries during the submission space. On 23 July 2026, 11 books were longlisted and were announced by Akachi Adimora-Ezeigbo, the chairman of the advisory board. Previous winners such as Gabriel Okara, Tade Ipadeola, Ikeogu Oke, and Romeo Oriogun were among the longlist.

On 26 August 2025, the shortlist was released and it contained only three books; Flora’s Love Colony by Tare Oburumu, Why Does God Need a Gun? by Ogaga Ifowodo and Unbind Me Now by James Ngwu Eze. On 9 October 2026, Ogaga Ifowodo was announced as the winner for his poetry collection, Why God Does Need a Gun?

== Panel ==
- Akachi Adimora-Ezeigbo - chairperson of the Advisory Board

== Nominee ==
indicates the winner
indicates shortlisted

Author	Title	Publisher
Saddiq Dzukogi	Bakandamiya: An Elegy	University of Nebraska Press
Tanure Ojaide	Adult Love	Konya Shamsrumi
Paul Akpomuje	Black Passport	Griots Lounge Canada
Ajibola Tolase	2000s Blacks	University of Pittsburgh Press
Theresa Lola	Ceremony for the Nameless	Penguin Books UK
Ayo Oyeku	Corpus: Animistic Verses	Simon & Schuster
Tares Oburumu	Flora's Love Colony	Fair Child Media Publishing
Rasaq Malik Gbolahan	The Origin of Wounds	Masobe Books
Ogaga Ifowodo	Why Does God Need a Gun?	Masobe Books
Adedayo Agarau	The Years of Blood	Masobe Books
James Ngwu Eze	Unbind Me Now	Masobe Books

== See also ==
- List of winners and nominated authors of the Nigerian Prize for Literature
