= Soji Cole =

Nigerian academic, playwright, and author

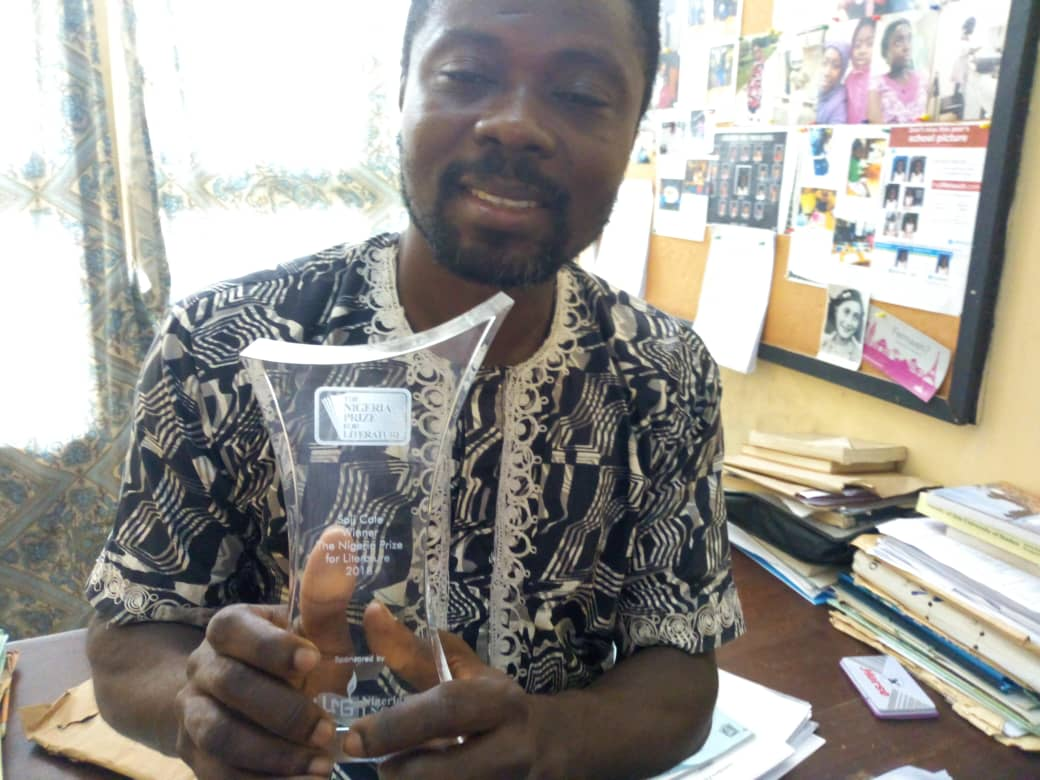
- Dr. Soji Cole in his office (2018)
- Born: Olusoji Henry Cole; Mushin Oloosa, Lagos State, Nigeria
- Citizenship: Nigeria
- Education: University of Ibadan
- Occupation: Writer
- Writing career
- Years active: 2010 - present
- Genres: Short story, Realistic fiction, drama
- Notable awards: Nigeria Prize for Literature

Soji Cole is a Nigerian academic, playwright, and author. He is the 2018 recipient of the Nigeria Prize for Literature. His research interests include interrogating the sociology of Black literatures and cultures,drama therapy, trauma studies and cross-cultural performance research. He is currently a professor of Black Atlantic Literature, Performance, and Creative Writing at Saint Mary's University, Halifax, Nova Scotia, Canada.

His book Embers was listed as one of the best Nigerian books of 2018 by Dailytrust Newspaper.

== Early life and education ==
Soji Cole was born into the family of Mr Gbadebo John Cole and Mrs Gbemisola Adunni Cole in Mushin Oloosa, Lagos, Nigeria.

He is an alumnus of the University of Ibadan and was also a visiting fellow at the University of Roehampton.

== Writing career ==
Cole disclosed to Dailytrust that writing short stories was how he got his first publication. Speaking on challenges of emerging authors in Nigeria, he identified financial constraints and infrastructural decline as factors diminishing the literary drive in the country. He also recounted how electricity was a huge challenge while writing his novels. In an interview with The Sun, Cole recalled that he began writing while in elementary school just to feel a sense of belonging among his age-groups. He also narrated how My Little Stream became his first published novel. He published his first play, Maybe Tomorrow (2014), a story based on the plight of the people in the Niger Delta. The book was long-listed for the 2014 Nigeria Prize for Literature, and won the Association of Nigerian Authors (ANA) award. In October 2018, Cole's book Embers emerged as the best out of 89 entries that qualified for the 2018 Nigeria Prize for Literature. The book explores the impact of religious and ethnic violence on the living conditions of people in Northern Nigeria.

== Bibliography ==
- My Little Stream (2010)
- Ghost (2014)
- Bambo Bambo (2014)
- Maybe Tomorrow (2014)
- War Zone (2017)
- Embers

== Recognition ==
Aside the awards won below, Cole has been shortlisted for Wole Soyinka Prize for Literature in Africa and BBC World Playwriting Competition.

- African Theater Association (AfTA) Emerging Scholars Prize (2011)
- The International Federation for Theater Research New Scholar Prize (2013)
- Association of Nigerian Authors (ANA) Prize for Writing (2014)
- Nigeria Prize for Literature (2018)
