= A Good Mourning =

Poetry book by Ogaga Ifowodo

A Good Mourning is a 2016 poetry book by Ogaga Ifowodo.

== Reception ==
The book was shortlisted for the 2017 Nigeria Prize for Literature.

== Sources ==
- "Memory and Trauma In Ogaga Ifowodo's "A Good Mourning"". Premium Times Nigeria.
- Okogba, Emmanuel (2017-09-11). "A Good Mourning: a poet's reflections on Africa's darkest moments". Vanguard News.
- Nation, The (2017-09-16). "This apocalyptic mournfulness". The Nation Newspaper.
