= Flashbulb memory =

Type of vivid, enduring autobiographical memory

A flashbulb memory is a vivid, long-lasting memory about a surprising or shocking event.

The term "flashbulb memory" suggests the surprise, indiscriminate illumination, detail, and brevity of a photograph; however, flashbulb memories are only somewhat indiscriminate and are far from complete. Evidence has shown that although people are highly confident in their memories, the details of the memories can be forgotten.

Flashbulb memories are one type of autobiographical memory. Some researchers believe that there is reason to distinguish flashbulb memories from other types of autobiographical memories because they rely on elements of personal importance, consequence, emotion, and surprise. Others believe that ordinary memories can also be accurate and long-lasting if they are highly distinctive, personally significant, or repeatedly rehearsed.

Flashbulb memories have six characteristic features: place, ongoing activity, informant, own affect, other affect, and aftermath. Arguably, the principal determinants of a flashbulb memory are a high level of surprise, a high level of consequentiality, and perhaps emotional arousal.

== Historical overview ==
The term flashbulb memory was coined by Roger Brown and James Kulik in 1977. They formed the special-mechanism hypothesis, which argues for the existence of a special biological memory mechanism that, when triggered by an event exceeding critical levels of surprise and consequentiality, creates a permanent record of the details and circumstances surrounding the experience. Brown and Kulik believed that although flashbulb memories are permanent, they are not always accessible from long-term memory. The hypothesis of a special flashbulb-memory mechanism holds that flashbulb memories have special characteristics that are different from those produced by "ordinary" memory mechanisms. The representations created by the special mechanism are detailed, accurate, vivid, and resistant to forgetting. Most of these initial properties of flashbulb memory have been debated since Brown and Kulik first coined the term. Ultimately, over the years, four models of flashbulb memories have emerged to explain the phenomenon: the photographic model, the comprehensive model, the emotional-integrative model, and the importance-driven model, additional studies have been conducted to test the validity of these models.

== Positive vs. negative ==
It is possible for both positive and negative events to produce flashbulb memories. When the event is viewed as a positive event, individuals show higher rates of reliving and sensory imagery, and also showed having more live qualities associated with the event. Individuals view these positive events as central to their identities and life stories, resulting in more rehearsal of the event, encoding the memory with more subjective clarity.

On the other hand, events seen as negative by a person have demonstrated having used more detail-oriented, conservative processing strategies. Negative flashbulb memories are more highly unpleasant and can cause a person to avoid reliving the negative event. This avoidance could possibly lead to a reduction of emotionally intense memory. The memory stays intact in an individual who experiences a negative flashbulb memory but has a more toned-down emotional side. With negative flashbulb memories, they are seen to have more consequences.

Flashbulb memories can be produced but do not need to be from a positive or negative event. Studies have shown that flashbulb memories may be produced by experiencing a type of brand-related interaction. It was found that brands that are well-differentiated from competitors (for example, Build-A-Bear Workshop versus KB Toys) produced a definitional flashbulb memory, but brands lacking strongly differentiated positioning do not. These "flashbulb brand memories" were viewed very much like conventional flashbulb memories for the features of strength, sharpness, vividness, and intensity.

== Methods ==
Research on flashbulb memories generally shares a common method. Typically, researchers conduct studies immediately following a shocking, public event. Participants are first tested within a few days of the event, answering questions via survey or interview regarding the details and circumstances regarding their personal experience of the event. Then groups of participants are tested for a second time, for example six months, a year, or 18 months later. Generally, participants are divided into groups, each group being tested at different intervals. This method allows researchers to observe the rate of memory decay, the accuracy, and the content of flashbulb memories.

== Accuracy ==
Many researchers feel that flashbulb memories are not accurate enough to be considered their own category of memory. One of the issues is that flashbulb memories may deteriorate over time, just like everyday memories. Also, it has been questioned whether flashbulb memories are substantially different from everyday memories. A number of studies suggest that flashbulb memories are not especially accurate, but that they are experienced with great vividness and confidence. In a study conducted on September 12, 2001, 54 Duke students were tested for their memory of hearing the terrorist attack and their recall of a recent everyday event. Then, they were randomly assigned to be tested again either 7, 42 or 224 days after the event. The results showed that the mean number of consistent/inconsistent details recalled did not differ for flashbulb memories and everyday memories, in both cases declining over time. However, ratings of vividness, recollection and belief in the accuracy of memory declined only for everyday memories. These findings further support the claims that "flashbulb memories are not special in their accuracy but only in their perceived accuracy."

Many experimenters question the accuracy of flashbulb memories, but rehearsal of the event is to blame. Errors that are rehearsed through retelling and reliving can become a part of the memory. Because flashbulb memories happen only a single time, there are no opportunities for repeated exposure or correction. Errors that are introduced early on are more likely to remain. Many individuals see these events that create flashbulb memories as very important and want to "never forget", which may result in overconfidence in the accuracy of the flashbulb memory. The most important thing in creating a flashbulb memory is not what occurs at the exact moment of hearing striking news, but rather what occurs after hearing the news. The role of post-encoding factors such as retelling and reliving is important when trying to understand the increase in remembrance after the event has already taken place.

Such research focuses on identifying reasons why flashbulb memories are more accurate than everyday memories. It has been documented that the importance of an event, the consequences involved, how distinct it is, personal involvement in the event, and proximity increase the accuracy of recall of flashbulb memories.

=== Stability over time ===
It has been argued that flashbulb memories are not very stable over time. A study conducted on the recollection of flashbulb memories for the Space Shuttle Challenger disaster sampled two independent groups of subjects on a date close to the disaster, and another eight months later. Very few subjects had flashbulb memories of the disaster after eight months. Considering only the participants who could recall the source of the news, ongoing activity, and place, researchers reported that less than 35% had detailed memories. Another study examining participants' memories of the Challenger Space Shuttle explosion found that although participants were highly confident about their memories of the event, their memories were not very accurate three years after the event had occurred. A third study conducted on the O. J. Simpson murder case found that although participants' confidence in their memories remained strong, the accuracy of their memories declined 15 months after the event, and continued to decline 32 months after the event.

While the accuracy of flashbulb memories may not be stable over time, confidence in the accuracy of a flashbulb memory appears to be stable over time. A study conducted on the bombing in Iraq and a contrasting ordinary event showed no difference for memory accuracy over a year period; however, participants showed greater confidence when remembering the Iraqi bombing than the ordinary event despite no difference in accuracy. Likewise, when memories for the 9/11 World Trade Center attack were contrasted with everyday memories, researchers found that after one year, there was a high, positive correlation between the initial and subsequent recollection of the 9/11 attack. This indicates very good retention, compared to a lower positive correlation for everyday memories. Participants also showed greater confidence in memory at the time of retrieval than the time of encoding.

=== Relation to autobiographical memory ===
Some studies indicate that flashbulb memories are not any more accurate than other types of memories. It has been reported that memories of high school graduation or early emotional experiences can be just as vivid and clear as flashbulb memories. Undergraduates recorded their three most vivid autobiographical memories. Nearly all of the memories produced were rated to be of high personal importance, but low national importance. These memories were rated as having the same level of consequentiality and surprise as memories for events of high national importance. This indicates that flashbulb memories may just be a subset of vivid memories and may be the result of a more general phenomenon.

When looking at flashbulb memories and "control memories" (non-flashbulb memories), it has been observed that flashbulb memories are incidentally encoded into one's memory, whereas if one wanted to, a non-flashbulb memory can be intentionally encoded in one's memory. Both of these types of memories have vividness that accompanies the memory, but it was found that for flashbulb memories, the vividness was much higher and never decreased compared to control memories, which in fact did decrease over time.

Flashbulb memory has always been classified as a type of autobiographical memory, which is memory for one's everyday life events. Emotionally neutral autobiographical events, such as a party or a barbecue, were contrasted with emotionally arousing events that were classified as flashbulb memories. Memory for the neutral autobiographical events was not as accurate as the emotionally arousing events of Princess Diana's death and Mother Teresa's death. Therefore, flashbulb memories were more accurately recalled than everyday autobiographical events. In some cases, consistency of flashbulb memories and everyday memories do not differ, as they both decline over time. Ratings of vividness, recollection and belief in the accuracy of memory, however, have been documented to decline only in everyday memories and not flashbulb memories.

The latent structure of a flashbulb memory is taxonic, and qualitatively distinct from non-flashbulb memories. It has been suggested that there are "optimal cut points" on flashbulb memory features that can ultimately divide people who can produce them from those who cannot. This follows the idea that flashbulb memories are a recollection of "event-specific sensory-perceptual details" and are much different from other known autobiographical memories. Ordinary memories show a dimensional structure that involves all levels of autobiographical knowledge, whereas flashbulb memories appear to come from a more densely integrated region of autobiographical knowledge. Flashbulb memories and non-flashbulb memories also differ qualitatively and not just quantitatively. Flashbulb memories are considered a form of autobiographical memory but involve the activation of episodic memory, whereas everyday memories are a semantic form of recollections. Being a form of autobiographical recollections, flashbulb memories are deeply determined by the reconstructive processes of memory, and just like any other form of memory are prone to decay.

=== Importance of an event ===
Brown and Kulik (1977) emphasized that importance is a critical variable in flashbulb memory formation. In a study conducted by Brown and Kulik, news events were chosen so that some of them would be important to some of their subjects, but not to others. They found that when an event was important to one group, it was associated with a comparatively high incidence of flashbulb memories. The same event, when judged lower on importance by another group, was found to be associated with a lower incidence of flashbulb memory. The retelling or rehearsal of personally important events also increases the accuracy of flashbulb memories. Personally important events tend to be rehearsed more often than non-significant events. A study conducted on flashbulb memories of the Loma Prieta earthquake found that people who discussed and compared their personal stories with others repeatedly had better recall of the event compared to Atlanta subjects who had little reason to talk about how they had heard the news. Therefore, the rehearsal of personally important events can be important in developing accurate flashbulb memories. There has been other evidence that shows that personal importance of an event is a strong predictor of flashbulb memories. A study done on the flashbulb memory of the resignation of the British prime minister, Margaret Thatcher, found that the majority of UK subjects had flashbulb memories nearly one year after her resignation. Their memory reports were characterized by spontaneous, accurate, and full recall of event details. In contrast, a low number of non-UK subjects had flashbulb memories one year after her resignation. Memory reports in this group were characterized by forgetting and reconstructive errors. The flashbulb memories for Margaret Thatcher's resignation were, therefore, primarily associated with the level of importance attached to the event.

When Princess Diana died, it was an unexpected and surprising event. It affected people across the globe. When looking at accuracy, the importance of the event can be related to how accurate an individual's flashbulb memory is. Reports found that among British participants, no forgetting occurred over four years since the event. Events that are highly surprising and are rated as highly important to an individual may be preserved in the memory for a longer period of time, and have the qualities of recent events compared to those not as affected. If an event has a strong impact on an individual these memories are found to be kept much longer.

=== Consequence ===
It was proposed that the intensity of initial emotional reaction, rather than perceived consequence, is a primary determinant of flashbulb memories. Flashbulb memories of the 1981 assassination attempt on President Reagan were studied, and it was found that participants had accurate flashbulb memories seven months after the shooting. Respondents reported flashbulb memories, despite low consequence ratings. This study only evaluated the consequence of learning about a flashbulb event, and not how the consequences of being involved with the event affect accuracy. Therefore, some people were unsure of the extent of injury, and most could only guess about the eventual outcomes. Two models of flashbulb memory state that the consequences of an event determine the intensity of emotional reactions. The Importance Driven Emotional Reactions Model indicates that personal consequences determine the intensity of emotional reactions. The consequence of an event is a critical variable in the formation and maintenance of a flashbulb memory. These propositions were based on flashbulb memories of the Marmara earthquake. The other model of flashbulb memory, called the Emotional-Integrative model, proposes that both personal importance and consequence determine the intensity of one's emotional state. Overall, the majority of research found on flashbulb memories demonstrates that consequences of an event play a key role in the accuracy of flashbulb memories. The death of Pope John Paul II did not come as a surprise but flashbulb memories were still found in individuals who were affected. This shows a direct link between emotion and event memory, and emphasizes how attitude can play a key factor in determining importance and consequence for an event. Events being high in importance and consequence lead to more vivid and long-lasting flashbulb memories.

=== Distinctiveness of an event ===
Some experiences are unique and distinctive, while others are familiar, commonplace, or similar to much that has gone on before. Distinctiveness of an event has been considered to be a main contributor to the accuracy of flashbulb memories. The accounts of flashbulb memory that have been documented as remarkably accurate have been unique and distinctive from everyday memories. It has been found that the uniqueness of an event can be the best overall predictor of how well it will be recalled later on. In a study conducted on randomly sampled personal events, subjects were asked to carry beepers that went off randomly. Whenever the beeper sounded, participants recorded where they were, what they were doing, and what they were thinking. Weeks or months later, the participants' memories were tested. The researchers found that recall of action depends strongly on uniqueness. Similar results have been found in studies regarding distinctiveness and flashbulb memories; memories for events that produced flashbulb memories, specifically various terrorist attacks, had high correlations between distinctiveness and personal importance, novelty, and emotionality. It has also been documented that if someone has a distinctive experience during a meaningful event, then accuracy for recall will increase. During the 1989 Loma Prieta earthquake, higher accuracy for the recall of the earthquake was documented in participants who had distinctive experiences during the earthquake, often including a substantial disruption in their activity.

=== Personal involvement and proximity ===
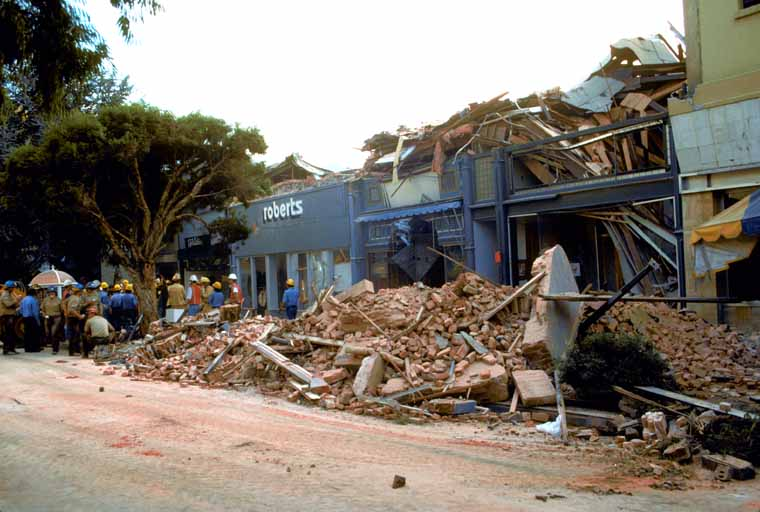
Santa Cruz's historic Pacific Garden Mall suffered severe damage during the 1989 Loma Prieta earthquake.

It has been documented that people that are involved in a flashbulb event have more accurate recollections compared to people that were not involved in the event. Recollections of those who experienced the Marmara earthquake in Turkey had more accurate recollections of the event than people who had no direct experience. In this study, the majority of participants in the victim group recalled more specific details about the earthquake compared to the group that was not directly affected by the earthquake, and rather received their information about it from the news. Another study compared Californians' memories of an earthquake that happened in California to the memories of the same earthquake formed by people who were living in Atlanta. The results indicated that the people that were personally involved with the earthquake had better recall of the event. Californians' recall of the event was much higher than Atlantans', with the exception of those who had relatives in the affected area, such that they reported being more personally involved. The death of Pope John Paul II has created many flashbulb memories among people who were more religiously involved with the Catholic Church. The more involved someone is in a religion, city or group, the more importance and consequentiality is reported for an event. More emotions are reported, resulting in more consistent flashbulb memories.

A study (Sharot et al. 2007) conducted on the September 11 attacks demonstrates that proximity plays a part in the accuracy of recall of flashbulb memories. Three years after the terrorist attacks, participants were asked to retrieve memories of 9/11, as well as memories of personally selected control events from 2001. At the time of the attacks, some participants were in the downtown Manhattan region, closer to the World Trade Center, while others were in Midtown, a few miles away. The participants who were closer to downtown recalled more emotionally significant detailed memories than the Midtown participants. When looking solely at the Manhattan participants, the retrieval of memories for 9/11 was accompanied by an enhancement in recollective experience relative to the retrieval of other memorable life events in only a subset of participants who were, on average, two miles from the World Trade Center (around Washington Square) and not in participants who were, on average, 4.5 miles from the World Trade Center (around the Empire State Building). Although focusing only on participants that were in Manhattan on 9/11, the recollections of those closer to the World Trade Center were more vivid than those who were farther away. The downtown participants reported seeing, hearing, and even smelling what had happened. Personal involvement in, or proximity to, a national event could explain greater accuracy in memories because there could be more significant consequences for the people involved, such as the death of a loved one, which can create more emotional activation in the brain. This emotional activation in the brain has been shown to be involved in the recall of flashbulb memories.

=== Source of information ===
When looking at the source of knowledge about an event, hearing the news from the media or from another person does not cause a difference in reaction; rather, it causes a difference in the type of information that is encoded to one's memory. When hearing the news from the media, more details about the events themselves are better remembered due to the processing of facts while experiencing high levels of arousal, whereas when hearing the news from another individual, a person tends to remember personal responses and circumstances.

Additionally, the source monitoring problem contributes to the recollection and memory errors of flashbulb memories. Over time, new information is encountered, and this post-significant event information from other sources may replace or be added to the part of information already stored in memory. Repeated rehearsal of the news in media and between individuals makes flashbulb memories more susceptible to misremembering the source of information, thus leading to less recall of true details of the event. In a study done by Dutch researchers, participants were asked about an event of El Al Boeing 747 crash on apartment buildings in Amsterdam. Ten months after the accident, participants were asked if they recalled seeing the television film of the moment the plane hit the building. According to the results, over 60% of the subjects said they had seen the crash on television, although there was no television film regarding the incident. If they said yes, they were asked questions about the details of the crash and most falsely reported that they saw the fire had started immediately. This study demonstrates that adults can falsely believe that they have witnessed something they actually have not seen themselves but only heard from news or other people. Even, they can go further to report specific but incorrect details regarding the event. The error rate in this experiment is higher than usually found in flashbulb experiments since it uses a suggestive question instead of the usual neutral 'flashbulb memory question,' and unlike in typical flashbulb memory studies, subjects are not asked how they first learned about the event, which does not lead to critical consideration of possible original source. However, it demonstrates how even flashbulb memories are susceptible to memory distortion due to source monitoring errors.

== Demographic differences ==
Although people of all ages experience flashbulb memories, different demographics and ages can influence the strength and quality of a flashbulb memory.

=== Age differences ===
In general, younger adults form flashbulb memories more readily than older adults. One study examined age-related differences in flashbulb memories: participants were tested for memory within 14 days of an important event and then retested for memory of the same event 11 months later. Even 11 months after the event occurred, nearly all the younger adults experienced flashbulb memories, but less than half of the older adults met all the criteria of a flashbulb memory. Younger and older adults also showed different reasons for recalling vivid flashbulb memories. The main predictor for creating flashbulb among younger adults was emotional connectedness to the event, whereas older adults relied more on rehearsal of the event in creating flashbulb memories. Being emotionally connected was not enough for older adults to create flashbulbs; they also needed to rehearse the event over the 11 months to remember details. Older adults also had more difficulty remembering the context of the event; the older adults were more likely to forget with whom they spoke and where events took place on a daily basis. If older adults are significantly impacted by the dramatic event, however, they could form flashbulb memories that are just as detailed as those that younger adults form. Older adults that were personally impacted by or close to September 11 recalled memories that did not differ in detail from those of younger adults. Older adults were found to be more confident in their memories than younger adults, in regards to whom they were with, where they were, and their own personal emotions at the time of hearing the news of 9/11. Older adults remembered a vast majority of events between the ages of 10 and 30, a period known as the "reminiscence bump". During that period, events occur during a time of finding one's identity and peak brain function. These events tend to be more talked about than events occurring outside this period. Flashbulb memories from the "reminiscence bump" are better remembered by older adults than are memories are having recently occurred.

=== Cultural variations ===
Generally the factors that influence flashbulb memories are considered to be constant across cultures. Tinti et al. (2009) conducted a study on memories of Pope John Paul II's death amongst Polish, Italian, and Swiss Catholics. The results showed that personal involvement was most important in memory formation, followed by proximity to the event.

Flashbulb memories differ among cultures with the degree to which certain factors influence the vividness of flashbulb memories. For example, Asian cultures tend to de-emphasize individuality; therefore, Chinese and Japanese people might not be as affected by the effects of personal involvement on vividness of flashbulb memories. A study conducted by Kulkofsky, Wang, Conway, Hou, Aydin, Johnson, and Williams (2011) investigated the formation of flashbulb memories in 5 countries: China, the United Kingdom, the United States, Germany, and Turkey. Overall participants in the United States and the United Kingdom reported more memories in a 5-minute span than participants from Germany, Turkey, and China. This could simply be due to the fact that different cultures have different memory search strategies. In terms of flashbulb memories, Chinese participants were less affected by all factors related to personal closeness and involvement with the event. There were also cultural variations in the effects of emotional intensity and surprise.

=== Gender ===
Some studies conducted in this area of research yielded findings indicating that women are able to produce more vivid details of events and recall autobiographical events elicited by Senate hearings than men. One such study had participants fill out questionnaires about flashbulb memories and recollections of autobiographical events pertaining to the Senate hearings that confirmed Clarence Thomas as a Supreme Court Justice (Morse, 1993). The study found that half of the individuals reported vivid memory images associated with the hearings. 64% of women reported images as opposed to 33% men. 77% of women reported having had stimulated recall of an autobiographical event, while only 27% of men indicated having experienced such recall. Women were more likely than men to report additional imagery (24% of women and 6% of men). Women were more likely than men to report vivid image memories and recall of autobiographical events elicited by the hearings, but they did not differ from men in the ratings of these memories. There was also no difference in the average amount of time spent consuming media on the hearing.

A large body of research was conducted into events taking place during the 9/11 terrorist attacks, although it was not specifically researching gender differences. In one study researchers had participants answer questions to establish "consistent flashbulb memory," which consists of details about where the participants were at the time of the attacks, what they were doing, etc. In 2002 it was found that 49% of women and 47% of men fulfilled these requirements. In 2003, this dropped to 46% of women and 44% of men (Conway, 2009). Women seemed more likely to have a more consistent memory for the event than men in this study. A longer time since the incident decreases the consistency of the memory. However, a study aimed at finding whether a series of terrorist attacks with common features elicit flashbulb memories found a different pattern of gender effects. Men rated the distinctiveness of their flashbulb-producing event higher than women did. Additionally, men had memories with more detail than women. Women however, reported higher rates of emotional reactivity.

Biological reasons for gender variances in flashbulb memory may be explained by amygdala asymmetry. The amygdala is a part of the limbic system, and is linked with memory and emotion. Memory is enhanced by emotion, and studies have shown that people are more likely to remember a negative event than a neutral or positive one. Investigations into the amygdala revealed "people who showed strong amygdala activation in response to a set of positive or negative stimuli (relative to other study participants) also showed superior memory for those stimuli (relative to other study participants)". This may explain why flashbulb memory typically involves traumatic events. When viewing emotional content, research has shown that men enhance their memory by activating their right amygdala while women activate the left side. Although it is still unclear how lateralization affects memory, there may be a more effective relationship between activation of the left amygdala and memory than activation of right and memory. Generally speaking, studies testing differences between genders on episodic memory tasks revealed that "women consistently outperform men on tasks that require remembering items that are verbal in nature or can be verbally labeled" (Herlitz, 2008). It seems that women also "excel on tasks requiring little or no verbal processing, such as recognition of unfamiliar odors or faces" (Herlitz, 2008). Men only seem to excel in memory tasks that require visuospatial processing. Gender differences are also very apparent in research on autobiographical memory. To sum up these gender differences, most literature on memory indicates that:

Women use a greater quantity and variety of emotion words than men when describing their past experiences ... Women include not only a greater number of references to their own emotional states but also a greater number of references to the emotional states of others. In addition, when asked to recall emotional life experiences, women recall more memories of both positive and negative personal experiences than men.

— Bloise & Johnson, 2007

Overall women seem to have better memory performance than men in both emotional and non-emotional events.

There are many problems with assessing gender differences found in the research into this topic. The clearest is that it is heavily reliant on self-reporting of events. Inaccuracy of findings could result from biased questions or participants misremembering. There is no way to completely verify the accuracy of accounts given by the subjects in a study. Additionally, there are many indications that eye-witness memory can often be fallible. Emotion does not seem to improve memory performance in a situation that involves weapons. Eyewitnesses remember fewer details about perpetrators if a weapon is involved in an event (Pickel, 2009). Accuracy in these situations is compromised by a phenomenon known as the weapon focus effect. Further complicating matters is the time frame in which people are surveyed in relation to the event, as many studies survey people well after the events. Thus, there is a validity issue with much of the research into flashbulb memory in general, as well as any apparent gender differences.

== Improvement ==
A number of studies have found that flashbulb memories are formed immediately after a life changing event happens or when news of the event is relayed. Although additional information about the event can then be researched or learned, the extra information is often lost in memory due to different encoding processes. A more recent study, examining effects of the media on flashbulb memories for the September 11, 2001 attacks, shows that extra information may help retain vivid flashbulb memories. Although the researchers found that memory for the event decreased over time for all participants, looking at images had a profound effect on participants memory. Those who said they saw images of the September 11th attacks immediately retained much more vivid images 6-months later than those who said they saw images hours after they heard about the attacks. The latter participants failed to encode the images with the original learning of the event. Thus, it may be the images themselves that lead some of the participants to recall more details of the event. Graphic images may make an individual associate more with the horror and scale of a tragic event and hence produce a more elaborate encoding mechanism. Furthermore, perhaps looking at images may help individuals retain vivid flashbulb memories months, and perhaps even years, after an event occurs.

== Controversy: special mechanism hypothesis ==
The special-mechanism hypothesis has been the subject of considerable discussion in recent years, with some authors endorsing the hypothesis and others noting potential problems.This hypothesis divides memory processes into different categories, positing that different mechanisms underlie flashbulb memories. Yet many argue that flashbulb memories are simply the product of multiple, unique factors coalescing.

=== Supporting evidence ===
Data concerning people's recollections of the Reagan assassination attempt provide support for the special-mechanism hypothesis. People had highly accurate accounts of the event and had lost very few details regarding the event several months after it occurred. Additionally, an experiment examining emotional state and word valence found that people are better able to remember irrelevant information when they are in a negative, shocked state. There is also neurological evidence in support of a special mechanism view. Emotionally neutral autobiographical events, such as a party, were compared with two emotionally arousing events: Princess Diana's death, and Mother Teresa's death. Long-term memory for the contextual details of an emotionally neutral autobiographical event was related to medial temporal lobe function and correlated with frontal lobe function, whereas there was no hint of an effect of either medial temporal lobe or frontal lobe function on memory for the two flashbulb events. These results indicate that there might be a special neurobiological mechanism associated with emotionally arousing flashbulb memories.

=== Opposing evidence ===
Studies have shown that flashbulb memories can result from non-surprising events, such as the first Moon landing, and also from non-consequential events. While Brown and Kulik defined flashbulb memories as memories of first learning about a shocking event, they expand their discussion to include personal events in which the memory is of the event itself. Simply asking participants to retrieve vivid, autobiographical memories has been shown to produce memories that contain the six features of flashbulb memories. Therefore, it has been proposed that such memories be viewed as products of ordinary memory mechanisms. Moreover, flashbulb memories have been shown to be susceptible to errors in reconstructive processes, specifically systematic bias. It has been suggested that flashbulb memories are not especially resistant to forgetting. A number of studies suggest that flashbulb memories are not especially accurate, but that they are experienced with great vividness and confidence. Therefore, it is argued that it may be more precise to define flashbulb memories as extremely vivid autobiographical memories. Although they are often memories of learning about a shocking public event, they are not limited to such events, and not all memories of learning about shocking public events produce flashbulb memories.

== Models ==
=== Photographic model ===
Brown and Kulik proposed the term flashbulb memory, along with the first model of the process involved in developing what they called flashbulb accounts. The photographic model proposes that in order for a flashbulb account to occur in the presence of a stimulus event, there must be, a high level of surprise, consequentiality, and emotional arousal. Specifically, at the time in which an individual first hears of an event, the degree of unexpectedness and surprise is the first step in the registration of the event. The next step involved in registration of flashbulb accounts is the degree of consequentiality, which in turn, triggers a certain level of emotional arousal. Brown and Kulik described consequentiality as the things one would imagine may have gone differently if the event had not occurred, or what consequences the event had on an individual's life. Further, Brown and Kulik believed that high levels of these variables would also result in frequent rehearsal, being either covert ("always on the mind") or overt (ex. talked about in conversations with others). Rehearsal, which acts as a mediating process in the development of a flashbulb account, creates stronger associations and more elaborate accounts. Therefore, the flashbulb memory becomes more accessible and vividly remembered for a long period of time.

=== Comprehensive model ===
Some researchers recognized that previous studies of flashbulb memories are limited by the reliance on small sample groups of few nationalities, thus limiting the comparison of memory consistency across different variables. The comprehensive model was born out of similar experimentation as Brown and Kulik's, but with a larger participant sample. One major difference between the two models is that the Photographic Model follows more of a step-by-step process in the development of flashbulb accounts, whereas the Comprehensive Model demonstrates an interconnected relationship between the variables. Specifically, knowledge and interest in the event affects the level of personal importance for the individual, which also affects the individual's level of emotional arousal (affect). Furthermore, knowledge and interest pertaining to the event, as well as the level of importance, contribute to the frequency of rehearsal. Therefore, high levels of knowledge and interest contribute to high levels of personal importance and affect, as well as high frequency of rehearsal. Finally, affect and rehearsal play major roles in creating associations, thus enabling the individual to remember vivid attributes of the event, such as the people, place, and description of the situation.

=== Emotional-integrative model ===
The Emotional-Integrative Model of flashbulb memories integrates the two previously discussed models the Photographic Model and the Comprehensive Model. Similar to the Photographic Model, the Emotional-Integrative Model states that the first step toward the registration of a flashbulb memory is an individual's degree of surprise associated with the event. This level of surprise triggers an emotional feeling state, which is also a result of the combination of the level of importance (consequentiality) of the event to the individual, and the individual's affective attitude. The emotional feeling state of the individual directly contributes to the creation of a flashbulb memory. To strengthen the association, thus enabling the individual to vividly remember the event, emotional feeling state and affective attitude contribute to overt rehearsal (mediator) of the event to strengthen the memory of the original event which, in turn, determines the formation of a flashbulb memory. According to the Emotional-Integrative model flashbulb memories can also be formed for expected events. The formation of flashbulb memories in this case depends greatly on a high emotional relationship to the event and rehearsal of the memory.

=== Importance-driven emotional reactions model ===
This model emphasizes that personal consequences determine intensity of emotional reactions. These consequences are, therefore, critical operators in the formation and maintenance of flashbulb memories. This model was based on whether traumatic events were experienced or not during the Marmara earthquake. According to the findings of this study, the memories of the people who experienced the earthquake were preserved as a whole, and unchanged over time. Results of the re-test showed that the long-term memories of the victim group are more complete, more durable and more consistent than those of the comparison group. Therefore, based on this study, a new model was formed that highlights that consequences play a very large role in the formation of flashbulb memories.

=== Compared to traumatic memories ===
Flashbulb memories are engendered by highly emotional, surprising events. Flashbulb memories differ from traumatic events because they do not generally contain an emotional response. Traumatic memories involve some element of fear or anxiety. While flashbulb memories can include components of negative emotion, these elements are generally absent.

There are some similarities between traumatic and flashbulb memories. During a traumatic event, high arousal can increase attention to central information leading to increased vividness and detail. Another similar characteristic is that memory for traumatic events is enhanced by emotional stimuli. An additional, a difference between the nature of flashbulb memories and traumatic memories, is the amount of information regarding unimportant details that will be encoded in the memory of the event. In high-stress situations, arousal dampens memory for peripheral information—such as context, location, time, or other less important details. To rephrase, flashbulb memories are described as acute awareness of where a person was and what they were doing when a significant or traumatic event occurred, and are not characterized by strong emotion, while traumatic memories are accompanied by highly negative emotions such as anxiety, fear, and panic when the related event is recalled.

== Neurological bases ==
=== Amygdala ===
Amygdala highlighted in red

Laboratory studies have related specific neural systems to the influence of emotion on memory. Cross-species investigations have shown that emotional arousal causes neurohormonal changes, which engage the amygdala. The amygdala modulates the encoding, storage, and retrieval of episodic memory. These memories are later retrieved with an enhanced recollective experience, similar to the recollection of flashbulb memories. The amygdala, therefore, may be important in the encoding and retrieval of memories for emotional public events. Since the role of the amygdala in memory is associated with increased arousal induced by the emotional event, factors that influence arousal should also influence the nature of these memories. The constancy of flashbulb memories over time varies based on the individual factors related to the arousal response, such as emotional engagement and personal involvement with the shocking event. The strength of amygdala activation at retrieval has been shown to correlate with an enhanced recollective experience for emotional scenes, even when accuracy is not enhanced. Memory storage is increased by endocrine responses to shocking events; the more shocking an individual finds an event, the more likely a vivd flashbulb memory will develop.

There has been considerable debate as to whether unique mechanisms are involved in the formation of flashbulb memories, or whether ordinary memory processes are sufficient to account for memories of shocking public events. Sharot et al. found that for individuals who were close to the World Trade Center, the retrieval of 9/11 memories engaged neural systems that are uniquely tied to the influence of emotion on memory. The engagement of these emotional memory circuits is consistent with the unique limbic mechanism that Brown and Kulik suggested. These are the same neural mechanisms, however, engaged during the retrieval of emotional stimuli in the laboratory. The consistency in the pattern of neural responses during the retrieval of emotional scenes presented in the laboratory and flashbulb memories suggests that even though different mechanisms may be involved in flashbulb memories, these mechanisms are not unique to the surprising and consequential nature of the initiating events.

Evidence indicates the importance of the amygdala in the retrieval of 9/11 events, but only among individuals who personally experienced these events. The amygdala's influence on episodic memory is explicitly tied to physiological arousal. Although simply hearing about shocking public events may result in arousal, the strength of this response likely varies depending on the individual's personal experience with the events.

== Critique of research ==
Flashbulb memory research tends to focus on public events that have a negative valence. There is a shortage on studies regarding personal events such as accidents or trauma. This is due to the nature of the variables needed for flashbulb memory research: the experience of a surprising event is hard to manipulate. Also, it is very hard to conduct experiments on flashbulb memories due to lack of control over the events. In an empirical study, it is very difficult to control the rehearsal amount.

Some researchers also argue that the effect of rehearsal factors on individual memory is different with respect to the availability of the mass media across different societies.

== See also ==
- Memory and trauma
- Yerkes–Dodson law
- Now Print!
