= Saddiq Dzukogi =

Nigerian poet and academic

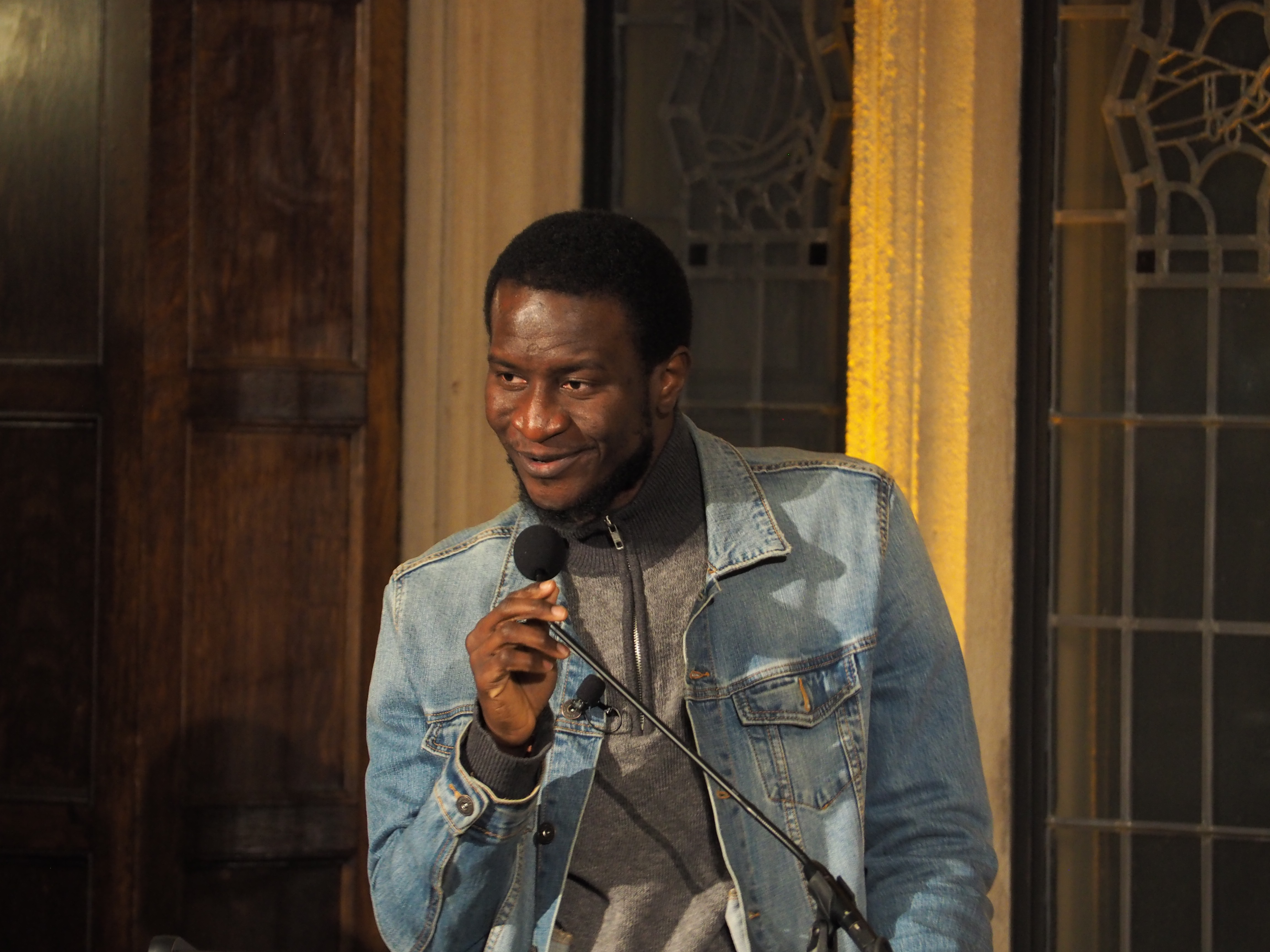
Image of Saddiq Dzukogi

Saddiq Dzukogi (born in Minna) is a Nigerian poet and assistant professor at University of Nebraska-Lincoln and has previously taught at Mississippi State University's Department of English. He is the author of Your Crib, My Qibla, a highly-acclaimed poetry collection which has earned him the 2022 Derek Walcott Prize for Poetry, and the 2021 Julie Suk Award as a co-winner. The collection was also shortlisted for the $100,000 Nigeria Prize for Literature.

== Education ==
Saddiq Dzukogi holds a degree in mass communication from Ahmadu Bello University, Zaria in 2015. In 2022, he received a PhD in English with specialization in Ethnic Studies & Creative Writing at the University of Nebraska–Lincoln where he was a recipient of the Othmer Fellowship. At the University of Nebraska–Lincoln, Dzukogi was awarded the "Student Luminary Award" in 2022 in recognition of his exceptional leadership and commitment to improving the university campus, and the Vreeland Award for Poetry in 2020 and 2022.

== Works and awards ==
Dzukogi is the author of Inside the Flower Room, which was selected by Kwame Dawes and Chris Abani for the APBF New-Generation African Poets Chapbook Series (2018). His poems have appeared in Oxford Review of Books, Kenyon Review, Oxford Poetry, Salamander, Southeast Review, Crab Orchard Review, Prairie Schooner, New Orleans Review, South Dakota Review, and Obsidian, among others.

Dzukogi was a finalist for the 2017 Brunel International African Poetry Prize. His poem "Paradise" won him the 2021 Wilbur Gaffney Poetry Prize. He was the first-Runner up for the 2022 Maureen Egan Writers Exchange Award. He has also been a three-time finalist for the Association of Nigeria Authors' Poetry Prize in 2012, 2014 and 2016.

In October 2022, Dzukogi's anthology, Your Crib, My Qibla was announced as the winner of the Derek Walcott Prize for Poetry. In the same month, the collection was announced as a co-winner of the Julie Suk Award for the Best Poetry Book Published by a Literary Press in 2021. The collection was equally one of the three shortlisted for the $100,000 Nigeria Prize for Literature.

The anthology was selected as one of Oprah Daily's 29 best poetry books in America for 2021. It was also named as one of the 50 Notable African Books of 2021 by the Africa Centre and Brittle Paper, as one of the 20 must-read literary books of 2021 in the Africa Report.

Dzukogi was at different times a recipient of several fellowships and grants from the Nebraska Arts Council, Mississippi Arts Commission, Pen America, the Obsidian Foundation, and the University of Nebraska–Lincoln, and the Ebedi International Writers Residency.
