= Seun Lari-Williams =

Nigerian lawyer, poet, and academic

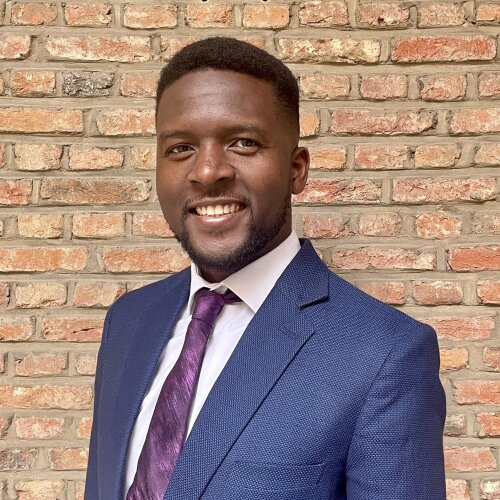
- Born: April 28, 1987 (age 38)
- Occupation: Lawyer and writer
- Education: University of Lagos, Munich Intellectual Property Law Center, University of Antwerp
- Notable works: Garri for Breakfast

Seun Lari-Williams (born 1987) is a Nigerian lawyer, poet, and academic. He is known for his poetry collection Garri for Breakfast, which was longlisted for the Nigeria Prize for Literature in 2017. He is the son of the late Nigerian actor and playwright Lari Williams.

== Early life and education ==
Seun Lari-Williams attended Badagry Grammar School in Lagos, Nigeria. He studied law at the University of Lagos, where he served as the president of the Law Society and chairman of the Council of Faculty Presidents. During his tenure, he played a key role in student advocacy and university policy discussions. He was called to the Nigerian Bar in 2014, following which he worked as a litigation lawyer in Nigeria and as an intellectual property consultant. In 2020, Lari-Williams received his Master of Laws (LL.M.) in Intellectual Property and Competition Law as a DAAD scholar at the Munich Intellectual Property Law Center (MIPLC), which is run in collaboration with the Max Planck Institute for Innovation and Competition, the University of Augsburg, the Technical University of Munich, and the George Washington University Law School.

== Poetry and literary works ==
Lari-Williams' poetry and fiction often explore themes of identity, justice, and contemporary Nigerian society. His notable works include the poetry collections Garri for Breakfast (2016) and A Little Violence (2022). In addition to poetry, Lari-Williams writes speculative fiction with elements of magical realism. His recent short stories "Drum Call" (2025) and "GbeneBeka: The Gospel According to Wiayor" (2025), published in Omenana Magazine, draw on Nigerian cosmology and environmental themes.

== Reception and criticism ==
=== Garri for Breakfast (2016) ===
Lari-Williams' debut collection, Garri for Breakfast, was noted for its portrayal of Nigerian life through humor and satire. The collection was praised for its cultural authenticity and wit, as well as its didacticism and satire, and as "an encyclopedia for the modern poet.”

In 2017, Garri for Breakfast was longlisted for the Nigeria Prize for Literature. At the time, Lari-Williams was the youngest nominee among the eleven poets on the longlist.

The collection also faced criticism from some quarters. While some critics labeled Lari-Williams' work as "beer-parlour poetry," suggesting a lack of depth and sophistication, others have defended Lari-Williams, drawing parallels between the criticism he faced and the initial reception of Walt Whitman's work, and arguing for a more inclusive understanding of poetic expression, and the importance of diverse voices in literature.

=== A Little Violence (2022) ===
Lari-Williams' second collection, A Little Violence, continues his exploration of Nigerian society, addressing themes of urban life, corruption, and personal loss. One review highlighted the poem "When it Rains in Lagos" for its use of irony and personification. The collection also delves into issues like domestic violence, gender injustices, and mental health. The poem "A Little Violence" gained recognition beyond literary circles, referenced by Solomon Fowowe in an article discussing the Zamfara killings to illustrate the impact of violence on communities.

A Little Violence has been recognized in the RovingHeights Bestseller List 2022, presented in collaboration with Open Country Mag. The book ranked as the third top-selling poetry book in Nigeria for 2024.

Lari-Williams has been featured on several literary platforms, including the second edition of the "Book 'n' Gauge" literary event organized by RovingHeights Books and Guaranty Trust Bank, which also featured Poetolu.

== Academic career and honours ==
Seun Lari-Williams is currently a doctoral researcher in the Government and Law Research Group at the University of Antwerp's Faculty of Law. He has authored a number of scholarly publications in the field of intellectual property law, and has earned several distinctions for his academic work. In 2021, Williams was the winner of the Third Edition of the ALAI European Authors’ Right Award, supported by the European Grouping of Societies of Authors and Composers (GESAC), for his MIPLC master’s thesis titled "Bridging the Value Gap Between Content Creators and Digital Media Platforms: A Case Study of YouTube."

In 2025, Lari-Williams received the Third Prize in the Best Doctoral Presentation Contest organized by the International Association for the Advancement of Teaching and Research in Intellectual Property in Copenhagen, for his PhD research on dispute system design in the creative sector. In the same year, he received a Recommendation of Distinction (Runner-Up) for the EPIP Young Scholar Award for his paper "An Empirical Research Agenda for Evaluating Creative Sector Dispute Resolution Systems," which was presented at the European Policy for Intellectual Property (EPIP) Conference in Antwerp. Also in 2025, he received the Tier 1 Prize in the World Intellectual Property Organization ADR Young Article Competition for his paper proposing a novel dispute resolution procedure for AI-related copyright disputes.
