= A Small Silence =

2019 novel by Jumoke Verissimo

- First edition (publ. Cassava Republic Press)
- Author: Jumoke Verissimo

A Small Silence is a 2019 novel by Nigerian poet and writer Jumoke Verissimo.

== Plot ==
A Small Silence tells the story of a professor who never turns on the light in his Lagos apartment where a female spirit who he cannot see always visits him. The spirit who cannot see him too, visits him only at night.
