= The Heresiad =

Book of poetry by Ikeogu Oke

The Heresiad is a poetry book by Nigerian poet Ikeogu Oke, published by Kraft Books in Nigeria. Oke said in an interview that the book took him 27 years to write.

The book won the 2017 Nigeria Prize for Literature. According to the judges, "it employs the epic form in questioning power and freedom" and "probes metaphorically the inner workings of societies and those who shape them".

The Nigeria Review writers Onyebuchi James Ile and Solomon Osekene praised the book's allegorical nature and describes it as the "best poetic piece out of Africa".

Uchenna Ekweremadu's review says that it is the "clarity of the picture and the intensity of the plot that hold the reader spellbound".
