= Now Print! =

Theory in neurobiology

The Now Print! theory, first proposed by Robert B. Livingston in 1967, is an attempt to explain the neurobiology underlying the flashbulb memory phenomenon. The theory argues that a special mechanism exists in the brain, which issues a now print! order to preserve moments of great personal significance.

== Theory ==
The Now Print! mechanism could have evolved because of the selection value of permanently retaining biologically crucial, but unexpected events. The same mechanism may account for both the enduring significant memories in which one has played the role of protagonist and those in which one has only been a member of an interested audience of millions. (Brown & Kulik, 1977, pp. 97–99).

The circumstances of a now print! reaction are described by Brown and Kulik: "First comes the recognition of high novelty or unexpectedness; then comes a test for biological meaning for the individual; if this second test is met, there follows the permanent registration not only of the significant novelty, but of all recent brain events."(1967b, p. 576).

Brown and Kulik proposed that the Now Print! theory delivered an evolutionary advantage by giving rise to very specific and durable memories of events of high personal consequence. Such memories might be used vicariously in preparing effective avoidance and approach strategies and so aid in survival. “The mechanism is activated when a given event occurs unexpectedly and has biologically significant consequences for individual’s lives so that people are ready to recognize similar events in the future,” (Lanciano, Curci & Semin, 2010). When this happens memories for these events contain an abnormal amount of sensory and peripheral details that give the impression of accuracy.

== Studies ==
Researchers have tested this theory extensively in order to determine whether it is viable. The overwhelming evidence has shown the Now Print! hypothesis to be unsupported. Neisser (2000) explains that most memories that become flashbulbs do not obtain their significance immediately, but instead only later with rehearsal and repetition through interactions with other people or personal reflection on an event.

In other studies, Neisser & Harsch (1992) and Neisser et al. (1996) provide evidence for the inaccuracy of flashbulb memories and thereby weaken the Now Print! hypothesis. The former assesses the accuracy of participants memories of the Challenger explosion soon after it happened and then two and a half years later to determine the precision of their memories. The latter compares three different groups of people based on the 1989 California earthquake. One group was located in a different state and only ‘heard’ about the quake, the second group experienced relatively minor effects in Berkeley located near the epicenter, and the third group resided in Santa Cruz, where major damage occurred. The participants answered a questionnaire soon after the earthquake experience and then another time one and a half years later. Although the participants who experienced the more severe conditions of the earthquake had a higher “mean remembered rating” than the other group located nearby, the results from this study show that memory was not necessarily better if high emotionality was involved in the context. The group of participants located in an entirely different state than the quake did even worse regarding the amount of recalled items.
