= Jumoke Verissimo =

Nigerian writer and academic

- Born: 1979 (age 46–47); Lagos, Nigeria
- Education: Lagos State University (B.A.); University of Ibadan (M.A.); University of Alberta (PhD)
- Occupations: Poet; novelist; critic; academic
- Notable work: i am memory , A Small Silence

Jumoke Verissimo (born 1979) is a Nigerian poet, novelist, critic and academic. She is the author of the poetry collections I Am Memory (2008), The Birth of Illusion (2015) and Circumtrauma (2025), and the novel A Small Silence (2019). Verissimo is an assistant professor in the Department of English at Toronto Metropolitan University in Canada.

== Life and career ==
Verissimo was born in Lagos, Nigeria. She studied Literature in English at Lagos State University, Performance Studies at the University of Ibadan, and English at the University of Alberta, where she completed a doctorate.

Before her academic career, Verissimo worked as an editor, sub-editor, copywriter and freelance journalist, including at The Guardian and NEXT. She became involved with the Association of Nigerian Authors and participated in literary workshops and festivals. In 2012, she received the Chinua Achebe Centre Fellowship at Bard College.

Her first poetry collection, I Am Memory, was published in 2008. The collection won the Carlos Idzia Ahmad Prize for First Book of Poetry and the Anthony Agbo Prize for Poetry, and received an honourable mention in the Association of Nigerian Authors Poetry Prize.

Dami Ajayi describes the collection as "a bold stance of pain and other emotions, filtering through the pores of gross indifference and achieving a communal cry of retrospective protest." Shoola Oyindamola of WRR described I Am Memory as a collection centred on memory and its relationship with loss, dispossession and historical experience. A 2026 study by Abigail Kekeghe and Sunny Awhefeada examines I Am Memory through its representations of memory, identifying themes including slavery, racism, exploitation, political violence and anguish.

Her second poetry collection, The Birth of Illusion, was published in 2015. It was shortlisted for the Association of Nigerian Authors Poetry Prize in 2016 and longlisted for the Nigeria Prize for Literature in 2017.

=== A Small Silence ===
Verissimo's debut novel, A Small Silence, was published by Cassava Republic Press in 2019. The novel follows Prof, a former political prisoner and retired academic, and Desire, an orphaned student who forms a relationship with him. It explores trauma, isolation, memory and the aftermath of political violence.

In The Guardian, Irenosen Okojie described the novel as a "lyrical debut" and highlighted its treatment of trauma and the ways in which characters cope with the aftermath of violence. Olukorede Yishau, reviewing the novel in The Lagos Review, identified silence and darkness as recurring motifs in the book.

A Small Silence was shortlisted for the Ondaatje Prize and the Edinburgh International Book Festival First Book Award, and won the Aidoo-Snyder Book Prize in 2020.

=== Later work ===
In 2022, Verissimo and James Yeku co-edited Sọ̀rọ̀sókè: An #EndSARS Anthology, an anthology of poetry responding to the #EndSARS protests. Michael Olatunbosun of The Eagle Online praised the editors' work and described the anthology as a "potent and eloquent protest" against police brutality.

Verissimo's children's book Grandma and the Moon's Hidden Secret was longlisted for the Nigeria Prize for Literature in 2024.

Her third poetry collection, Circumtrauma, was published by Coach House Books in 2025.

Canadian poet and critic Rob McLennan described the collection as an assemblage of poem-fragments and noted its use of archival and research material alongside the poems. Taiwo Michael Oloyede, writing in New Telegraph, described Circumtrauma as an exploration of the Nigeria–Biafra War.

Circumtrauma was named one of CBC Books' best Canadian poetry books of 2025.

== Works ==
=== Poetry ===
- — (2008). I Am Memory. DADA Books. ISBN 978-978-088-065-1.
- — (2015). The Birth of Illusion. Fullpoint Publications. ISBN 978-978-946-697-9.
- — (2025). Circumtrauma. Coach House Books. ISBN 978-1552455128.

=== Novels ===
- — (2019). A Small Silence. Cassava Republic Press. ISBN 9781911115793.

=== Children's books ===
- — (2022). Grandma and the Moon's Hidden Secret. Cassava Republic Press. ISBN 9781913175351.
- — (2022). Àdùkẹ́, Ìyá Àgbà Àti Àṣírí Òṣùpá. Cassava Republic Press. ISBN 9781913175382.

=== Anthologies ===
- —; Yeku, James, eds. (2022). Sọ̀rọ̀sóke: An #EndSARS Anthology. Lagos: Noirledge. ISBN 9789785874693.

== Awards and nominations ==
Year	Nominee / work	Award	Result
2009	Carlos Idzia Ahmad Prize for First Book of Poetry	Won	I Am Memory
2009	Anthony Agbo Prize for Poetry	Second prize	I Am Memory
2012	Chinua Achebe Centre Fellowship	Fellow	
2016	Association of Nigerian Authors Poetry Prize	Shortlisted	The Birth of Illusion
2017	Nigeria Prize for Literature	Longlisted	The Birth of Illusion
2020	Aidoo-Snyder Book Prize	Won	A Small Silence
2020	Ondaatje Prize	Shortlisted	A Small Silence
2020	Edinburgh International Book Festival First Book Award	Shortlisted	A Small Silence
2024	Nigeria Prize for Literature	Longlisted	Grandma and the Moon's Hidden Secret
2025	CBC Books' Best Canadian Poetry Books of 2025	Selected	Circumtrauma
