= James Yeku =

Nigerian-Canadian writer and academic

James Túndé Yékú is a Nigerian-Canadian writer and associate professor of African and African-American Studies at the University of Kansas. He specialises in African literary and cultural studies, and digital humanities research. His research interests include: African literature, digital humanities, Social media, cultural studies, postcolonial and decolonial theories, and Nollywood. He has published widely on different subjects across these fields.

Yékú is the author of Cultural Netizenship: Social Media, Popular Culture, and Performance in Nigeria (Indiana University Press, 2022), and the poetry collection Where The Baedeker Leads: A Poetic Journey, which received an honorable mention for the 2023 African Literature Association Best Book Award for creative writing. Yeku's poetry and essays have been published in various literary journals and mediums.

== Education ==
James Yékú trained as a literary and cultural studies scholar at Ibadan and Saskatoon. He received his bachelor's and master's degrees in English, and Performance Studies respectively at the University of Ibadan in 2008 and 2012. He earned his Ph.D. in English at the University of Saskatchewan in 2018.

== Career and recognition ==
Yékú was engaged as a lecturer at the University of Saskatchewan's Department of English from 2017 to 2018. A year later, he moved to the University of Kansas, where he is currently an associate professor at its Department of African and American Studies and the Institute for Digital Research in the Humanities.

Yékú was the winner of the 2022 Pius Adesanmi Early Career Research Excellence Award from the Canadian Association of African Studies. His journal article "Akpos Don Come Again: Nigerian Cyberpop Hero as Trickster" in the Journal of African Cultural Studies won the 2017 Abioseh Porter Best Essay Award of the African Literature Association. He has also received other awards and fellowships, which include a 2022 Center for Advanced Internet Studies fellowship in Bochum, as well as a 2023 Cultural Entrepreneurship and Digital Transformation in Africa and Asia international guest fellowship at the University of Mainz, both in Germany. In 2023, he had a stint at the Humboldt University of Berlin as a recipient of the Alexander von Humboldt Foundation Fellowship where he completed work on a new nonfiction collection, Ambivalent Encounters and Other Essays. Yékú currently spearheads African Digital Humanities initiatives at the University of Kansas and co-organizes the annual African Digital Humanities Symposium.

== Selected publications ==
- Yeku, James (2025). The Algorithmic Age of Personality: African Literature and Cancel Culture. Michigan State University Press. ISBN 978-1-61186-533-2.
- Yeku, James (2024). Ambivalent Encounters and Other Essays. Griots Lounge Publishing Canada. ISBN 978-1-7386993-5-3.
- Yékú, James (2024). "Encountering Mudi Yahaya's Nina Fischer-Stephan's Respectful Gaze in Lagos". Journal of African Cultural Studies: 1–7. doi:10.1080/13696815.2024.2320781. ISSN 1369-6815.
- Adeoba, ‘Gbenga; Yékú, James (2024-05-15). "Cultural netizenship as platformization of popular culture in Nigeria". International Journal of Cultural Studies. 28: 260–277. doi:10.1177/13678779241252997. ISSN 1367-8779.
- Yékú, James (2023). "#MakeNigeriaGreatAgain". The Black Scholar. 53 (1): 19–34. doi:10.1080/00064246.2022.2145594. ISSN 0006-4246.
- Yékú, James (2023), "Cartooning COVID-19 on Facebook", Global Health, Humanity and the COVID-19 Pandemic, Cham: Springer International Publishing, pp. 329–351, doi:10.1007/978-3-031-17429-2_15, ISBN 978-3-031-17428-5
- Yékú, James (2022). Cultural Netizenship: Social Media, Popular Culture, and Performance in Nigeria. Indiana University Press. ISBN 978-0-253-06050-1.
- Verisssimo, Jumoke; Yékú, James (2022-02-07). Sọ̀rọ̀sóke: An #Endsars Anthology. Noirledge Publishing. ISBN 978-978-58746-9-3.
- Yékú, James (2022), "The Police Is Your Friend", Routledge Handbook of African Popular Culture, London: Routledge, pp. 399–416, doi:10.4324/9781003080855-22, ISBN 978-1-003-08085-5
- Yékú, James (2022). "Digital African Literatures and the Coloniality of Data". The Cambridge Journal of Postcolonial Literary Inquiry. 9 (3): 381–398. doi:10.1017/pli.2022.19. hdl:1808/33604. ISSN 2052-2614.
- Yékú, James; Ojebode, Ayobami (2021). "From Google Doodles to Facebook: Nostalgia and Visual Reconstructions of the Past in Nigeria". African Studies Review. 64 (3): 498–522. doi:10.1017/asr.2020.118. ISSN 0002-0206.
- Yékú, James (2021). "In Praise of Ostentation: Social Class in Lagos and the Aesthetics of Nollywood's Ówàḿbẹ̀ Genres". African Studies. 80 (3–4): 434–450. doi:10.1080/00020184.2021.2000366. ISSN 0002-0184.
- Yeku, James (2019). "Chinua Achebe's There was a Country and the digital publics of African literature". Digital Scholarship in the Humanities. 36 (1): 209–223. doi:10.1093/llc/fqz084. ISSN 2055-7671.
- Yeku, James (2021). Where the Baedeker Leads: A Poetic Journey. Mawenzi House. ISBN 978-1-77415-050-4.
- Yékú, James (2020). "Anti-Afropolitan ethics and the performative politics of online scambaiting". Social Dynamics. 46 (2): 240–258. doi:10.1080/02533952.2020.1813943. ISSN 0253-3952.
- Yékú, James (2020). "Tricksters and female warriors: womanist interweavings from Oríta to Wakanda". Journal of the African Literature Association. 15 (1): 107–124. doi:10.1080/21674736.2020.1815965. ISSN 2167-4736.
- Yeku, James (2018), The Hashtag as Archive: Internet Memes and Nigeria's Social Media Election, African Histories and Modernities, Cham: Springer International Publishing, pp. 217–245, doi:10.1007/978-3-319-91310-0_11, ISBN 978-3-319-91309-4
