= Theresa Lola =

British Nigerian poet and writer (born 1994)

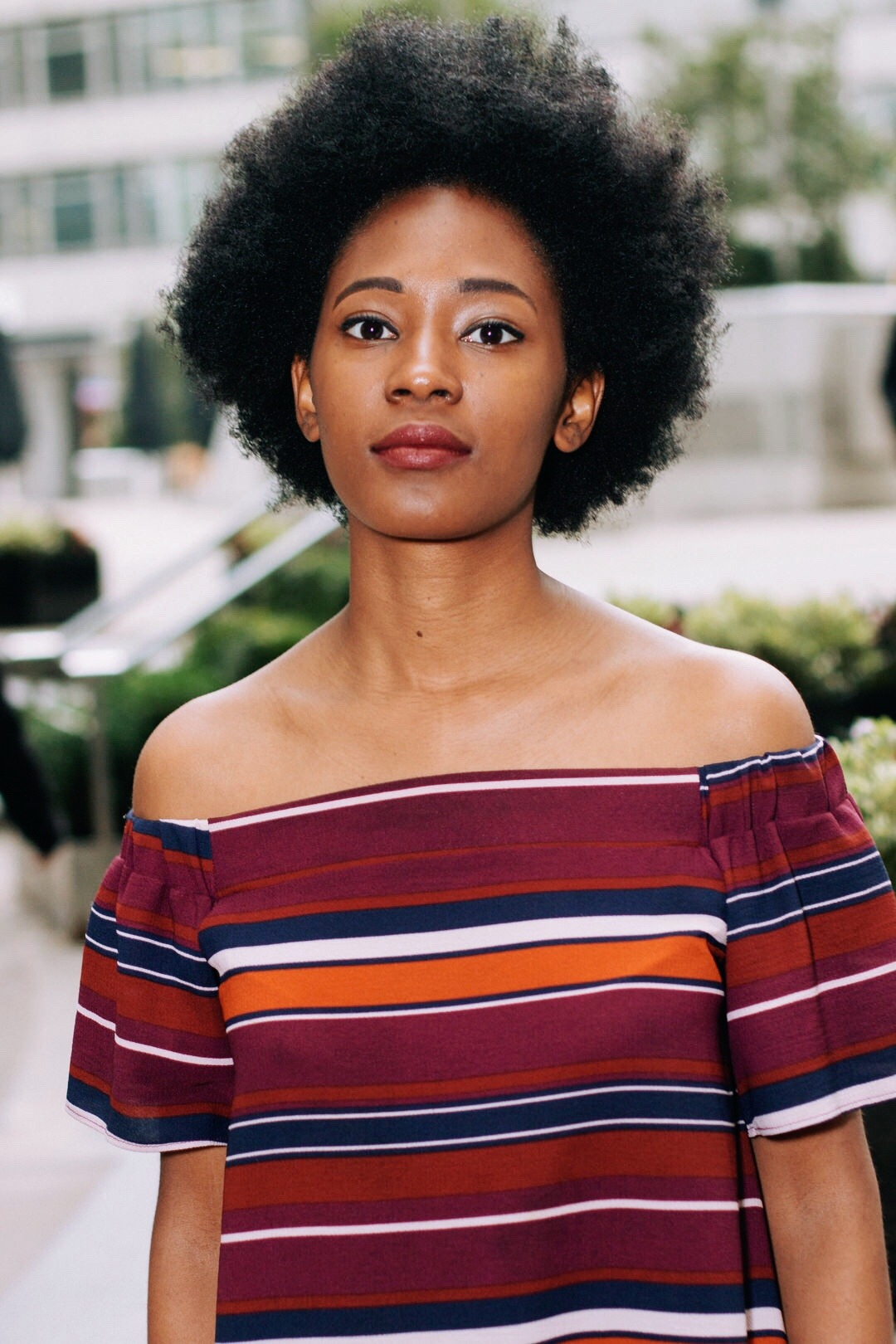
- Born: 6 May 1994 (age 32); Lagos, Nigeria
- Education: Kellogg College, Oxford, University of Hertfordshire
- Occupations: Poet and writer
- Notable work: Ceremony for the Nameless (2024), In Search of Equilibrium (2019)
- Awards: Brunel International African Poetry Prize, Derek Walcott Prize for Poetry

Theresa Lola (born 6 May 1994) is a British Nigerian poet and writer. She was joint winner of the 2018 Brunel International African Poetry Prize and the 2025 Derek Walcott Prize for Poetry. In April 2019, she was announced as the 2019 Young People's Laureate for London.

== Early life ==
Theresa Lola was born on 6 May 1994 in Lagos, Nigeria, and moved to London, England, in 2007 when she was 13 years old. In 2015, she graduated with a first-class degree in Accounting and Finance from the University of Hertfordshire. She later obtained a master's degree in Creative Writing from the University of Oxford.

== Career ==
After her undergraduate studies, Lola took part in the Barbican Young Poets programme. Shortly afterwards, she was shortlisted for the 2016 Bridport Poetry Prize, and later won the 2017 Hammer and Tongue National Poetry Slam.

In 2018, she was joint winner of the 2018 Brunel International African Poetry Prize. In that same year, she was commissioned by the Mayor of London's Office to write and read a poem at the unveiling of Millicent Fawcett's statue at Parliament Square. A year later, in April 2019, she was announced as the 2019 Young People's Laureate for London. In 2019, Lola's debut full-length poetry collection In Search of Equilibrium was published by Nine Arches Press, described by Pascale Petit as a "glorious hymn to being alive and wounded".

Theresa’s second collection, Ceremony for the Nameless, published by Penguin Books in 2024, explores the relationship between names, naming, and identity. The collection won the 2025 Derek Walcott Prize for Poetry, was longlisted for the 2026 Nigeria Prize for Literature, and received praise from critics. Renowned author Ishmael Reed has hailed the book as "relentlessly inventive and often stunning". Legendary writer Nikki Giovanni added: "What a joy to see a new sun rising in the poetic sky!"

== Bibliography ==
=== Poetry collections ===
- Ceremony for the Nameless, Penguin Books, 2024; ISBN 9781802065794
- In Search of Equilibrium, Nine Arches Press, 2019; ISBN 978-1-911027-68-3
