= African Literature Association =

Independent non-profit professional society

- Abbreviation: ALA
- Formation: 1974; 52 years ago
- Type: Independent non-profit professional society
- Purpose: To promote literary and cultural studies related to, and about, Africa and its diasporic populations
- Website: africanlit.org

The African Literature Association (ALA) is an independent non-profit professional society that was founded in the United States in 1974, with the aim of promoting literary and cultural studies related to, and about, Africa and its diasporic populations. It is open to scholars, teachers and writers from every country. According to its mission statement: "The ALA as an organization affirms the primacy of the African peoples in shaping the future of African literature and actively supports the African peoples in their struggle for liberation."

In 2024, Professor Gichingiri Ndigirigi was named as president of the ALA.

== Background ==
The ALA's inaugural conference was held at the University of Texas at Austin in 1975, when Dennis Brutus was elected the first chair of the organization. The ALA holds annual conferences on a variety of themes, marking its 50th anniversary with the 2025 conference on "Ecologies of Transition: Spaces and Mobilities in African Literature and Cultures", hosted by the University of Nairobi's Department of Literature.

== Journal of the African Literature Association (JALA) ==
In 2006, the organization launched its Journal of the African Literature Association (JALA). The journal is published by Taylor & Francis.
