= Ikeogu Oke =

Nigerian writer

- Born: 23 May 1967; Aba, Abia State. Nigeria
- Died: 24 November 2018 (aged 51); Abuja, Nigeria
- Education: University of Calabar; University of Nigeria, Nsukka
- Occupations: Poet, journalist
- Notable work: The Heresiad
- Awards: Nigeria Prize for Literature (2017)

Ikeogu Oke // (23 May 1967 – 24 November 2018) was a Nigerian author, journalist and award-winning poet. In 2017, he won the Nigeria Prize for Literature for his first collection of poetry The Heresiad.

== Education ==
Oke had an MA in Literature from the University of Nigeria, Nsukka and a BA degree in English and Literary Studies from the University of Calabar.

== Career ==
In 2017, Oke's collection of poetry The Heresiad was nominated for the Nigeria Prize for Literature, along with work by Ogaga Ifowodo and Tanure Ojaide. The Heresiad won, and in his acceptance speech, Oke described poetry as "healthy narcotics". "I am happy to be addicted to it as shown by my refusal to be swayed by such concerns. I have invoked the poem here hopefully to arouse the contemplation of how one's resolve to pursue one's dreams in spite of such concerns is the best decision that can lead to a fulfilled life," he wrote in his acceptance speech.

The book has been described as "a work that speaks to an intense commitment to innovation, tenacity, joyful experimentation and social commentary in a way that provokes delight and engagement." The prize judges described it as "a bold and wonderful experiment whose great strength also could have been its great weakness."

== Bibliography ==
=== Poetry ===
- Where I was Born (2002), Fourth Dimension Publishing Company, Nigeria.
- Salute Without Guns (2009), Manila Publishers Company, Nigeria.
- In the Wings of Waiting (2012), Manila Publishing company, Nigeria.
- The Heresiad (2017), Manila Publishing Company, Nigeria

=== Children's literature ===
- The Lion and the Monkey (2014), Manila Publishers Company, Nigeria.
- The Tortoise and the Princess (2015), Manila Publishers Company, Nigeria.

== Death ==
Oke died on 24 November 2018 at the National Hospital in Abuja, where he had been receiving treatment for a yet-to-be-disclosed illness. On 5 December 2020 at the Annual convention of the Association of Nigerian Authors held at Illorin, Kwara State, the maiden edition of the award which was instituted by the family in honour of Late Ikeogu Oke saw Chris Gonoh, announced as the winner by Olu Obafemi.
