= Memory and trauma =

Effects of trauma on memory

Memory and trauma is the deleterious effects that physical or psychological trauma has on memory.

Memory is defined by psychology as the ability of an organism to store, retain, and subsequently retrieve information. When an individual experiences a traumatic event, whether physical or psychological trauma, their memory can be affected in many ways. For example, trauma might affect their memory for that event, memory of previous or subsequent events, or thoughts in general. Additionally, It has been observed that memory records from traumatic events are more fragmented and disorganized than recall from non traumatic events. Comparison between narrative of events directly after a traumatic event versus after treatment indicate memories can be processed and organized and that this change is associated with decrease in anxiety related symptoms.

== Physical trauma ==
When people experience physical trauma, such as a head injury in a car accident, it can result in effects on their memory. The most common form of memory disturbance in cases of severe injuries or perceived physical distress due to a traumatic event is post-traumatic stress disorder, discussed in depth later in the article.

=== Traumatic brain injury ===
Damage to different areas of the brain can have varied effects on memory. The temporal lobes, on the sides of the brain, contain the hippocampus and amygdala, and therefore have a lot to do with memory transition and formation. Patients who have had injury to this area have experienced problems creating new long-term memories. For example, the most studied individual in the history of brain research, HM, retained his previously stored long-term memory as well as functional short-term memory, but was unable to remember anything after it was out of his short-term memory. A patient whose fornix was damaged bilaterally developed severe anterograde amnesia but no effect on any other forms of memory or cognition.

== Brain trauma ==
In addition to physical damage to the brain as a result of mechanical injury, there are other changes in the brain that can be observed. Neuroimaging studies on PTSD repeatedly identify key structures associated with pathology development. The structures observed to change are the amygdala, Anterior Cingulate Cortex (ACC), Pre Frontal Cortex (PFC), insula, and hippocampus. These parts of the brain are most affected because they contribute to the feeling and actions associated with fear, clear thinking, decision making and memory. As a result of individual changes within different brain structures communication and regulation within structures is also impacted.

=== Amygdala ===
The Amygdala is known as the "fear center of the brain," and is thought to be activated and regulated in response to stressful situations marked with perceived heightened stimulation. Specifically, the Amygdala is responsible for identifying threats of danger to self and safety. Consistent exposure to trauma and or stress, may lead to over-perception and heighten responsibility and sensitivity to threat. Increased activation in the fear center can impact communication with other circuits in the brain structure including connections between the PFC, amygdala, and hippocampus which can in turn affect how memory are stored by the hippocampus.

A person's amygdala does not fully develop until their late 20s. Stress experienced prior to that age may have more extensive impact compared to stress experienced after the amygdala is fully developed.

=== Pre-frontal cortex ===
The PFC is a brain structure responsible for executive functioning skills. Included in executive function abilities are emotional regulation, impulse control, mental cognition, and working memory among many other abilities.The PFC is also in charge of modulating response from the Amygdala. However, during high-stress situations, the Amygdala can suppress higher thinking functions of the PFC. Some PFC functions that may be impacted during traumatic stress include; failure of emotion reappraisal, heightened salience of emotional stimuli, failure to inhibit neuro-endocrine response to threat stimuli, inability to maintain or use extinction of conditioned fear.). People who have experienced trauma, especially chronic and ongoing trauma, may be observed to have under-activation of multiple parts of the PFC. Under activation of the PFC can lead to decreased modulation of the amygdala during a stress response. The PFC in most vulnerable to the effects of stress during adolescent and a traumatic event during this time period would have more extensive changes than stress experience when the PFC is fully developed around the mid 20s.

=== Hippocampus ===
The hippocampus is considered the memory center for the brain and is responsible for storing, encoding, retrieving, and reconsolidating memories. Studies indicate that people who have PTSD may have a "shrunken" hippocampus, some estimates indicate that there may be up to a decrease in a range of 5-26%. However, there are alternative explanations to account for the observed decreased hippocampus volume. One study by Gilbertson et al. (2002), suggests that perhaps decrease hippocampal volume may be a pre-existing factor that may predispose people for the development of PTSD. There are conflicting interpretation in understanding if decreased hippocampal volumes are a consequence or a pre-existing vulnerability associated with PTSD. While it is unclear if decreased hippocampal volume is evident as a consequence or prior to the traumatic event; there are numerous studies that indicate the hippocampus in under active during traumatic events and potentially also under-active after the event as well. An underactive or dysregulated Hippocampus has many clinical implications including in areas of neurogenesis, disturbances to organization of memory, and ability to impact other endocrine functions such as a stress-response.

The hippocampus is a major site of neurogenesis, it is where new neurons are born, impact to neurogenesis can have multiple implications. Some studies suggest that blocking of neurogenesis may have the ability to block the efficacy of anti-depressants which are used to treat symptoms of depression. According to the DSM-5 there is comorbidity among depression and PTSD. In addition to comorbidity rates, the symptoms of PTSD and Major Depression Disorder (MDD) also have some overlap. Specifically, both list negative alteration in mood and cognitive disturbances as a symptom, underlying the idea of a "c" factor or a cognitive dysfunction that can be seen as a transdiagnostic dimension of psychopathology. Trauma can impact the hippocampus and may have global implications in mood and symptom progression through the impacts on neurogenesis.

Changes to the hippocampus also may have impact to a person's ability to recall the traumatic experience and produce a trauma narrative . There have been studies that further expand on how trauma can impact victims ability to recall traumatic events. These memory difficulties in identifying, labeling, and completely processing the traumatic event can be targets for treatment through psychotherapy. The age of a person when they experience a traumatic event can also modulate the effects of the hippocampus. Particularly, the hippocampus is developing from birth to age 2 and is most vulnerable to the effects of stress during this time period. During adolescence the hippocampus is fully organized and less vulnerable to the effects of stress.

The hippocampus also has connections with the body's stress response system. The hippocampus is responsible for the negative feedback regulation of the Hypothalamic- pituitary-adrenal axis. Failure to regulate stress response through the HPA axis can have long-term health effects through the experience of chronic stress.

== Interpersonal trauma ==
Interpersonal trauma is psychological trauma resulting from adverse interactions between people. Interpersonal trauma could include sexual violence, domestic violence, and abuse in childhood. People in these instances present with PTSD, often with more complex features. Interpersonal trauma continues to be a significant public health problem in the United States, contributing to significant psychological distress and functional impairment.

Sexual violence victims are predominantly women. When interviewing women who had been sexually abused in childhood, Williams found that 38% of women had no recollection of the abuse in later adulthood. While those who experienced a singular traumatic event (e.g., witnessing the death of a parent) were better able to remember the traumatic experience. These results indicate that repeated traumatic experiences are more likely to be repressed than those that occurred only once.

The World Health Organization has identified that one in three women are victims of intimate partner violence. Exposure to intimate partner violence results in many adverse psychological and neurological outcomes. Strangulation is common in interpersonal violence, causing cerebral dysfunction and leading to memory impairment. Initial consequences of strangulation could be loss of consciousness and mild brain injury, while long-term residual problems include neurological impairment. In a meta-analysis of primarily self-report responses from a female sample, women exposed to intimate partner violence are prone to experiencing loss of consciousness, mild brain injury, motor and speech disparities, memory loss, and lack of help-seeking behavior.

=== Treatment ===
Individuals with a history of interpersonal trauma would benefit from psychoeducation concentrating on the manifestations of PTSD symptoms and trauma's consequences on memory may be beneficial. Some treatment approaches for survivors of interpersonal trauma also focus on memory restructuring. Trauma symptoms aid in preserving impaired memory; thus, restructuring memories through several possible treatment modalities can be advantageous in treating the trauma symptoms and patients' cognitions. These modalities include learning to address trauma memories by specifying triggers, re-conditioning flashbacks, and engaging in narrative restructuring. Additionally, some treatments aim to restructure memory through imagery and nightmare rescripting exercises. One consideration for therapists when suggesting memory restructuring to patients is the possible impact of prolonged exposure during treatment. Patients are required to describe trauma memories in great detail (e.g., imagery rescripting), which could lead to re-traumatization.

== Psychological trauma ==
=== Relevant memory ===
Of the different aspects of memory – working, short-term, long-term, etc. – the one most commonly affected by psychological trauma is long-term memory. Missing memories, changes to memory, intensified memories – all are cases of manipulations of long-term memory. Within the construct of long-term memory, trauma has been shown to alter implicit and explicit memory. For example, sexual abuse victims with PTSD have been shown to present with explicit memory deficits. These alterations can even occur in individuals who did not develop PTSD from trauma exposure.

==== Physical aspect ====
Long-term memory is associated with many different areas of the brain including the hippocampus, amygdala, thalamus and hypothalamus, peripheral cortex and temporal cortex. The hippocampus and amygdala have been connected with transference of memory from short-term memory to long-term memory. Thalamus and hypothalamus, located in the forebrain, are part of the limbic system; they are responsible for regulating different hormones and emotional and physical reactions to situations, including emotional stress or trauma. The thalamus is also related to reception of information and transferring the information, in the case of memories, to the cerebral cortex.

=== Physical effects ===
Psychological trauma has great effects on physical aspects of patients' brains, to the point that it can have detrimental effects akin to actual physical brain damage. The hippocampus is involved in the transference of short-term memories to long-term memories and is especially sensitive to stress. Stress causes glucocorticoids (GCs), adrenal hormones, to be secreted and sustained exposure to these hormones can cause neural degeneration. The hippocampus is a principal target site for GCs and therefore experiences a severity of neuronal damage that other areas of the brain do not. In severe trauma patients, especially those with post-traumatic stress disorder, the medial prefrontal cortex is volumetrically smaller in size than normal and is hyporesponsive when performing cognitive tasks, which could be a cause of involuntary recollection (intrusive thoughts). The medial prefrontal cortex controls emotional responsiveness and conditioned fear responses to fear-inducing stimuli by interacting with the amygdala. In those cases, the metabolism in some parts of the medial prefrontal cortex didn't activate as they were supposed to when compared to those of a healthy subject.

=== Psychological effects ===
As with many areas of psychology, most of these effects are under constant review, trial, and dissent within the scientific world regarding the validity of each topic.

==== Repressed memory ====
Perhaps one of the most controversial and well-known of the psychological effects trauma can have on patients is repressed memory. The theory/reality of repressed memory is the idea that an event is so traumatic, that the memory was not forgotten in the traditional sense, or kept secret in shame or fear, but removed from the conscious mind, still present in the long-term memory but hidden from the patient's knowledge. Sigmund Freud originated the concept of repression and theorized that individuals had full control over this repression. In fact, he refers to them as defense mechanisms that individual uses to keep themselves safe from negative consequences. Despite purposefully repressing these memories, Freud believed they still affect the individual unconsciously and, in some cases, will be brought back into one's recollection. Since Freud's original conception of repression, much has changed and been debated across the field of psychology. In the eyes of critics of repressed memory, it is synonymous with false memory; however its proponents will argue that these people truly did have traumatic experiences. In 2025, a new theory of forgetting linked repression and dissociation (as also did Freud) and used psychoanalytic theory to posit a new model of forgetting that includes repressed memories, motivated forgetting, short term memories and dissociation/PTSD.

Repressed memories and the impact of childhood trauma on memory are significant to note, as childhood sexual assault prosecutions may take place years after an alleged sexual assault. Maltreatment causes impairments or distortions in cognitive, emotional processes, neurobiology, and brain development which might affect memory. Repressed memories of interpersonal violence during childhood have been explored in longitudinal research. Findings suggest that adults' ability to recall from long-term memory instances of childhood maltreatment depends on numerous factors. Factors include individual differences and development, the overall impact of the traumatic experience, and the modality interviewers use to assess adult childhood trauma. For example, the more significant the impact of childhood maltreatment is, the more accurate adult long-term memory of the events recall may be. Additional predictors of long-term memory of child maltreatment are the form of abuse and the age of onset. Research shows that being older when traumatic events occur correlates with a more accurate memory.

==== Intrusive thoughts ====
Intrusive thoughts are defined as unwelcome, involuntary thoughts, images or unpleasant ideas that may become obsessions, are upsetting or distressing, and can be difficult to be free of and manage. In patients who have suffered from traumatic events, especially those with post-traumatic stress disorder, depression or obsessive-compulsive disorder, the thoughts are not as easy to ignore and can become troubling and severe. These thoughts are not typically acted on; the obsession of the thoughts usually comes from intense guilt, shame or anxiety relating to the fact that the patient is having the thoughts to begin with, so they are unlikely to actually act on things they feel so badly about. In trauma patients, the intrusive thoughts are typically memories from traumatic experiences that come at unexpected and unwanted times. The primary difference from other intrusive thoughts for patients is that the memories are real rather than imagined.

=== Emotion ===
Emotion is a large part of trauma, especially near death experiences. The effect emotions have on memory in different instances is an integral part of the effect of trauma on memory. Emotional events tend to be recalled with more frequency and clarity than memories not associated with extreme emotions. Typically traumatic events, such as physical attack or sexual abuse, are interrelated with strong negative emotions, causing these memories to be very strong and more easily recalled than memories not associated with similar emotions, or even those connected to positive emotions. Emotion's strong connection with memory also has to do with how much attention or focus an individual has on the event. If they are heavily emotionally involved in the event, a lot of their attention is directed at what's happening, rendering it a stronger memory. It is also the case with emotionally aroused situations that even if attention is limited, it is more likely that a memory associated with the strong emotion will remain as opposed to some neutral stimulus. This increase in attention and encoding is due to the activation of the prefrontal-hippocampal-amygdala complex and results in improvement in later memories. Chemically, this is because the emotional and physical stress caused by traumatic events creates an almost identical stimulation in the brain to the physiological condition that heightens memory retention. It excites the neuron-chemical activity centers of the brain that affects memory encoding and recollection. This reaction has been enforced by evolution as learning from high-stress environments is necessary in "fight or flight" decisions that characterize human survival.

== Implications in neuropsychological testing and treatment ==
It is common to see mild and subtle neurocognitive deficits in adults with PTSD across differing trauma types. Research typically breaks down the assessment of neurocognitive function into nine cognitive domains. These domains include attention/working memory, executive functions, verbal learning, verbal memory, visual learning, visual memory, language, speed of information processing, and visuospatial abilities. One study highlights the discrepancy in sustained attention, working memory, and verbal memory among veterans with PTSD compared to the control group.

=== Verbal and visual memory ===
Verbal memory is a recollection of verbally presented information. Several neuropsychological assessments can be administered to assess verbal memory, such as the Boston Naming Test (BNT), California Verbal Learning Test (CVLT), and the Logical Memory II subtest of the Wechsler Memory Scale-III (WMS-III). Neuropsychological assessments for verbal memory typically include learning a list of words or a story and then performing recall. Performance on assessments of verbal memory demonstrates an individual's ability to encode said material in memory. By comparison, visual memory is recalling what has been observed or seen.

It is typical for visual memory to remain intact, while verbal memory does not. This may explain why verbal trauma narratives are often disorganized, incoherent, or fragmented. While completing declarative verbal memory tasks, some individuals with PTSD illustrated anterograde memory difficulties and low encoding and storage. Research findings suggest this may be due to complications from PTSD symptoms, which may result from reduced left hippocampal gray matter density. Research suggests that this could have significant implications for an individual with PTSD's responsiveness to cognitive behavioral therapy because verbal memory impairment may impact spoken or written recall of trauma memories.

=== Attention and working memory ===
In response to cognitive tasks, neuroimaging supports the notion that individuals with PTSD evoke a hypoactive response in both attention and working memory. MRI results have shown significantly reduced gray matter density clusters in the anterior cingulate cortex, ventromedial prefrontal cortex, and left hippocampus. This area of the brain is typically involved in fear processing, emotion regulation, memory encoding, and retrieval; as such, damage to this area of the brain can lead to functional discrepancies. These brain structures support cognitive constructs such as attentional switching, information processing speed, and working memory. Hypervigilance is a commonly experienced symptom of PTSD, which indicates a dysfunction in attention processing manifested as a high-attention-bias toward possible environmental threats that is distracting or otherwise problematic in an individual's day to day life.

== Post-traumatic stress disorder ==
Post-traumatic stress disorder is a psychological disorder (in the same category as: reactive attachment disorder, disinhibited social engagement disorder, acute stress disorder and adjustment disorders) caused by exposure to a terrifying event or ordeal involving the occurrence or threat of physical harm or where a person learns these terrible events happened to a close family member or someone whom they care about. It is one of the most severe and well-known of the different types of psychological trauma, mostly due to its prevalence in war veterans. It can manifest itself as early as after the first year of life. Typically symptoms include avoidance of reminders of the traumatic event or mention thereof, irritability, trouble sleeping, emotional numbness and exaggerated reactions to surprises. One of the most common and powerful symptoms, is the recurrence of random intense memories from the event (intrusive thoughts). This can manifest itself in different ways such as flashbacks of the event and unwanted thoughts about the trauma (e.g. "why did this happen to me?"). PTSD patients who have gone through different traumatic experiences will have small variances in their symptoms, mostly insignificant. For example, PTSD patients who were rape victims will have aversion to words such as touch and dirty while patients who were in a fire or war experience will respond similarly to words like burn or fight.

The stress of PTSD can have an adverse effect on memory. Specifically, this can have severe effects on the hippocampus, including decrease in hippocampus volume, causing problems with transferring short-term to long-term memory, and with the formation of short-term memories. To expand on the relationship between PTSD and hippocampal volume, one meta-analysis found that individuals diagnosed with PTSD have significantly smaller hippocampi volumes compared to controls. Another meta-analysis found that in adults who experienced childhood trauma, the hippocampi were smaller than control hippocampi. In a broad overview, individuals with PTSD who have impairments to their memory generally have this impairment in their verbal memory, more so than their visual memory.

Though studies show that there is no singular way in which patients' memories are affected by PTSD, North Korean refugees with PTSD were found to have generally lower scores on memory tests than control groups of refugees without PTSD. The early presentation of memory impairment compared to complications with other cognitive functions may be due to dysfunction in the hippocampus.

World War II (WWII) contributed to an abundance of PTSD cases today. Many of the patients diagnosed with PTSD after WWII did not have memories of the traumatic events yet had symptoms like hysteria. The amnesia can be attributed to Freud's theory of repression which suggests that individuals repress their memories to keep themselves safe from further harm/consequences. Stricker et al.(2017) furthered this idea through research that demonstrated higher rates of cognitive impairment (e.g., executive functioning, attention, working memory, and processing speed) in individuals diagnosed with PTSD, like service members or veterans. Memory and learning ability were the most affected areas. More specifically, veterans had a more difficult time with initial learning and encoding the information than recalling it at a later time.

Moradi et al. ( 1999) attributes the memory loss associated with PTSD to "intrusion, avoidance, and hyperarousal symptoms." These symptoms are thought to interrupt performance memory. Additionally, the loss of memory was attributed to a smaller hippocampus in those with PTSD, as the hippocampus is responsible for memory functioning.

=== Effects of memory impairment on PTSD treatment response ===
Memory is a vital predictive factor in a positive response to cognitive behavioral therapy for individuals with a trauma history. Specifically, the more intact their verbal memory functioning, the greater the positive predictive outcomes are for treatment response. Additionally, treatment impacts highlight the bidirectional relationship between neurocognitive functioning and trauma symptom preservation. Several studies have associated improved PTSD symptoms with receiving a treatment that enhances cognitive inhibition. Some research supports EMDR and brief eclectic therapy as possible treatment modalities that can intercede verbal memory, processing speed, and executive functioning in individuals with PTSD symptoms. Memory performance improves alongside a reduction in PTSD symptoms, which indicates that some effects of PTSD on memory may be reversible upon symptom improvement. For example, patients who exhibited a positive treatment response showed improved verbal memory and increased hippocampal volume.

== See also ==
- Effects of stress on memory
- Involuntary memory
- Traumatic memory
