= Julie Suk =

American poet (1924–2025)

Julie Madison Suk (née Gaillard; March 18, 1924 – October 9, 2025) was an American poet and writer from Charlotte, North Carolina. She is the author of six volumes of poetry - The Medicine Woman (St. Andrews Press, 1980), Heartwood (Briarpatch Press, 1991), The Angel of Obsession (The University of Arkansas Press, 1992), The Dark Takes Aim (Autumn House Press, 2003), Lie Down With Me (Autumn House Press, 2011), and Astonished To Wake (Jacar Press, 2016), and co-editor of Bear Crossings: an Anthology of North American Poets. She is included in The Autumn House Anthology of Contemporary American Poetry. Her poems have appeared in many literary journals including The Georgia Review, Great River Review, The Laurel Review, Ploughshares, Poetry, Shenandoah, and TriQuarterly.

== Life and career ==
Suk was born and raised in Mobile, Alabama, on March 18, 1924. She attended Stephens College and the University of Alabama. In 1944 she married naval officer William Joseph Suk, who later founded the Charlotte engineering services company Polytech Services, Inc. shortly after the couple and their three children Julie, Bill, and Palmer moved from Shaker Heights, Ohio to Charlotte in 1966. For many years she was an artist, painting landscapes in oils. It was not until the 1960s that Suk took up poetry, inspired in part by the work of French poet Saint-John Perse. She lived in Charlotte from 1966. She died on October 9, 2025, at the age of 101.

== Awards ==
- In 2004 Julie Suk received the Irene Blair Honeycutt Lifetime Achievement Award from Central Piedmont Community College
- The Dark Takes Aim won the 2003 North Carolina Poetry Society’s Brockman-Campbell Book Award and The Oscar Arnold Young Award from The Poetry Council of North Carolina.
- Julie Suk was awarded the 1993 Bess Hokin Prize from Poetry magazine.
- The Angel of Obsession won the 1992 Arkansas Poetry Award and the Roanoke-Chowan Poetry Award.

== Works ==
=== Poetry collections ===
- The Medicine Woman. Laurinburg, NC: St. Andrews Press. 1980. ISBN 0-932662-32-3.
- Heartwood: Poems. Davidson, NC: Briarpatch Press. 1991. OCLC 26794405.
- The Angel of Obsession: Poems. Fayetteville, AR: University of Arkansas Press. 1992. ISBN 1-55728-246-3.
- The Dark Takes Aim. Pittsburgh, PA: Autumn House Press. 2003. ISBN 0-9669419-8-5.
- Lie Down with Me: New and Selected Poems. Pittsburgh, PA: Autumn House Press. 2011. ISBN 978-1-932870-55-8.
- Astonished To Wake: Poems. Jacar Press, Durham NC. 2016. ISBN 978-0-9364810-5-0

=== In anthologies ===
- Newman, Anne; Suk, Julie, eds. (1978). Bear Crossings: An Anthology of North American Poets. Newport Beach, CA: New South Co. ISBN 0-917990-02-1.
- McGovern, Robert; Haven, Stephen, eds. (1999). And What Rough Beast: Poems at the End of the Century. Ashland, OH: Ashland Poetry Press. ISBN 0-912592-41-9.
- Parisi, Joseph; Young, Stephen, eds. (2002). The Poetry anthology, 1912-2002 : ninety years of America's most distinguished verse magazine. Chicago, IL: Ivan R. Dee. ISBN 978-1-56663-468-7.
- Kitchen, Judith; Kooser, Ted, eds. (2009). The Poets Guide to the Birds. Tallahassee, FL: Anhinga Press. ISBN 978-1-934695-04-3.
