= Ayo Banjo =

Nigerian academic (1934–2024)

Ayo Banjo CON

Vice-Chancellor of the University of Ibadan
- In office 1984–1991

President, Nigeria Academy of Letters
- In office 2000–2004

Personal details
- Born: Ladipo Ayodeji Banjo; 2 May 1934 Oyo, Colony and Protectorate of Nigeria
- Died: 24 May 2024 (aged 90)

Ladipo Ayodeji Banjo, CON (2 May 1934 – 24 May 2024) was a Nigerian educational administrator and emeritus professor of English who was the Vice-Chancellor of the University of Ibadan, Nigeria. He also served as pro-chancellor of Ajayi Crowther University.

== Early life and education ==
Ayo Banjo was born on 2 May 1934 in Oyo, Colony and Protectorate of Nigeria (now in Oyo State, Nigeria) to Ayodele Banjo. He attended St. Andrews Anglican primary school and Christ Cathedral primary school in what is now Lagos state, Nigeria. He had his secondary education in Igbobi college likewise in the future Lagos State between 1947 and 1952. In 1966, he won the United States Department of State scholarship for an M.A. in linguistics at the University of California, Los Angeles, US. He further obtained a PhD in 1969 from the University of Ibadan, Nigeria.

== Career ==
Banjo began his career as a lecturer at the department of English language, University of Ibadan in 1966. He was appointed associate professor in 1973 and became a full professor in 1975 at the University of Ibadan, Nigeria. In 1981, he became the vice-chancellor of the University of Ibadan. He was appointed vice-chancellor of the University of Ibadan in 1984, a position he held till 1991. During this period, he was the chairman committee of vice-chancellor of Nigerian universities. He served as visiting professor for one year at the University of the West Indies at Cave Hill as well as visiting fellow at the University of Cambridge, England between 1993 and 1994. He was appointed the pro-chancellor of the University of Port Harcourt between 2000 and 2004. After his tenure he was appointed pro-chancellor of the University of Ilorin for two years (2005–2007). He also served as the incumbent pro-chancellor of Ajayi Crowther University.

== Death ==
Banjo died on 24 May 2024, aged 90.

== Awards and honours ==
- Justice of Peace (JP), Oyo State (1984)
- Commander of the Order of Niger, CON (2001)
- Literature honori causa, Port Harcourt (2005)
- Nigeria National Order of Merit, NNOM (2009)

== Membership in professional bodies ==
- President, Nigeria Academy of Letters (2000–2004)
- Fellow Nigeria Academy of Letters (2000–2004)
- Chairman, Sigma Foundation (2005–2010)
- Fellow of the Nigeria English Studies Association (2006)

== See also ==
- List of vice-chancellors of Nigerian universities
- University of Ibadan
