= Ogaga Ifowodo =

Nigerian lawyer, writer, human rights activist

- Born: May 14, 1966 (age 60); Oleh, Delta
- Education: University of Benin; Cornell University
- Occupations: Writer; Poet; Journalist; Lawyer
- Awards: 2026 Nigeria Prize for Literature

Ogaga Ifowodo (born May 14, 1966) is a Nigerian lawyer, scholar, poet, columnist/public commentator and human rights activist. He was awarded the 1998 PEN/Barbara Goldsmith Freedom to Write Award, given to writers "anywhere in the world who have fought courageously in the face of adversity for the right to freedom of expression". In October 2026, Ifowodo was awarded the Nigeria Prize for Literature, valued at $100,000, for his collection of poetry, Why Does God Need A Gun?.

== Biography ==
Ifowodo was born in Oleh, Delta State of Nigeria. He attended Federal Government College, Warri, for his secondary education. He studied law at the University of Benin from where he obtained an LL.B in 1989. He was called to the bar in 1991 and has worked for many years as a human rights activist with Nigeria's Civil Liberties Organization (CLO). He also attended Cornell University, from where he obtained his PhD in 2008. He also holds the Master of Fine Art (MFA) in poetry, and a PhD in English (post-colonial literary/cultural studies) from Cornell University, New York.

He previously taught poetry and literature at Texas State University. His work has been translated into German, Dutch, Romanian, Turkish and Italian. He served as a commissioner for the Nigerian government from 2016 to 2019. He remains active in the human rights sector, and he currently practices law in Nigeria.

== Work as a columnist ==
Ifowodo is a well-known poet and writer. He has published op-ed articles in virtually all of Nigeria's major newspapers. He wrote the fortnightly column "For Crying Out LOUD!" in Vanguard until July 2016. He has also published four books of poetry and his poems have been widely published in several anthologies and literary journals across the world, including Voices from all Over: Poems with Notes and Activities, The Times Literary Supplement, Poetry International, The Massachusetts Review, Crazyhorse, The Dalhousie Review, Atlanta Review, Mantis, Drumvoices Revue, and Migrations (an Afro-Italian anthology selected by Wole Soyinka for the Lagos Black Heritage Festival).

== Arrest and detention ==
In 1997, while returning from a Commonwealth Heads of Governments Summit in Edinburgh, Scotland, Ifowodo was arrested by the military regime of Sani Abacha regime for calling for stronger sanctions against the dictatorship. He was incarcerated, along other human rights activists, writers, and journalists, including his friends and writer Akin Adesokan and Babafemi Ojudu. He was never tried nor released until 1998, following sustained campaigns by Nigerian and international human writers and writer organisations. He was awarded the PEN/Barbara Goldsmith Freedom to Write Award, the Free World Award of the Netherlands-based Poets of All Nations and adopted as an honorary member of the PEN Centres of Germany, United States, and Canada.

Excerpts from his detention memoirs have been published in Gathering Seaweed: African Prison Writing (Heinemann), in New Writing 14 (Granta), in Nigeria's Vanguard newspaper, and on African-Writing.com.

== Politics ==
In 2014, Ifowodo returned to Nigeria from the United States where he had done postgraduate studies and taught for thirteen years. He sought the nomination of the All Progressive Party for a seat in the House of Representatives but, hampered by inadequate financial resources, did not get past the primaries. He had tried unsuccessfully to raise 57 million naira for the bid. In 2016, Ifowodo was appointed to the Niger Delta Development Commission (NDDC) Board of Directors. He served as the federal government commissioner for Delta State until 2019.

== Collections of poetry ==
=== Homeland and Other Poems ===
Ifowodo's first collection of poems, Homeland and Other Poems was published in 1998 by Kraft Books; a second edition was published in 2008 by Africa World Press It is 69 pages long, a collection "largely written in (and bordering on) the military era of Nigeria... describing the despicable situation of the Nigerian society during the period in question." As a manuscript, it won the Association of Nigerian Authors (ANA) Poetry Prize in 1993.

=== Madiba ===
Ifowodo's second collection was titled Madiba and was published by Africa World Press. It is 90 pages long. In it, Ifowodo "captures the angst, the failed hopes and the glaring despair of this generation." The collection won the ANA/Cadbury poetry prize in 2003.

=== The Oil Lamp ===
Ifowodo's third collection, The Oil Lamp, was published by Africa World Press in 2005. It was described as "a deliberate intervention in the Niger Delta debate".

It won the 2005 ANA/Gabriel Okara Poetry Prize.

=== A Good Mourning ===
In 2016, Ifowodo released his fourth collection of poetry titled A Good Mourning (Parrésia Publishers). It is a work containing 26 poems over 78 pages.

It was hailed as "a work of "entrancing quality," with a "familiar strangeness... The authenticity of the voice and the resonance that dot every line, are the stuff great and enduring poetry is made of."

A Good Mourning, the author says, is his poetic reflection on "the intimacy of evil", particularly the devastating blow to the psyche of the people caused by the annulment of the June 12, 1993 elections "by General Ibrahim Babangida, a military dictator."

In July 2017, A Good Mourning was longlisted for the Nigeria Prize for Literature, along with ten other works by Nigerian authors. In August of the same year, it was shortlisted, along with Tanure Ojaide's Songs of Myself and Ikeogu Oke's The Heresiad. The Prize, valued at $100,000 was won by Oke.

=== Why Does God Need A Gun? ===
In October 2026, Why Does God Need A Gun? was awarded the Nigeria Prize for Literature. The collection focused on themes such as religious intolerance and the relationships between religion, power, and the human condition.

== Awards and fellowships ==
- Association of Nigerian Authors (ANA) Prize for Poetry (1996)
- The ANA/Cadbury poetry prize (2003).
- The ANA/Gabriel Okara Poetry Prize (2005)
- The PEN Centres of the USA.
- Heinrich Böll Foundation (Honorary fellow).
- The Iowa Writing Programme (fellow).
- New Word Award of Poets of All Nations based in the Netherlands.
- PEN USA Barbara Goldsmith Freedom-to-Write Award (2008).
- Honorary membership of the PEN Centres of USA, Germany, Canada.
- 2026 Nigeria Prize for Literature
