= Nigeria Prize for Literature =

Nigeria's literary award

- Current: 2025 Nigeria Prize for Literature
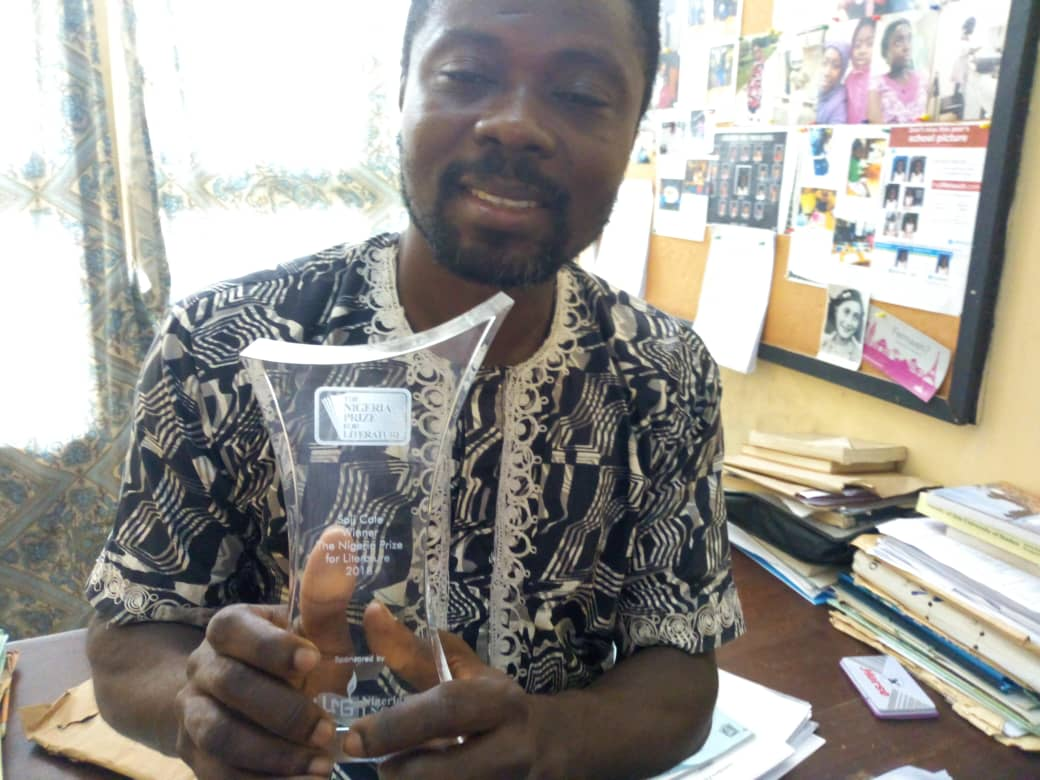
- Soji Cole in his office with his winner's plaque, 2018
- Awarded for: Excellence and literary craftsmanship
- Sponsored by: Nigeria Liquefied Natural Gas Limited
- Date: Annual
- Country: Nigeria
- Presented by: Nigerian Academy of Science; Nigerian Academy of Letters; Association of Nigerian Authors
- Reward: US$100,000
- First award: 2005; 21 years ago
- Current winner: Ogaga Ifowodo
- Website: Official website

The Nigeria Prize for Literature is a literary award given annually to honour literary works of excellence by Nigerian authors. Founded in 2004, the award rotates among four genres; fiction, poetry, drama and children's literature, repeating the cycle every four years. With the total prize value of US$100,000 to individual winner, it is the biggest literary award in Africa and one of the richest literary awards in the world.

== History ==
The prize was established in 2004 and sponsored by Nigeria Liquefied Natural Gas company. However, the process and judging are administered by Nigerian Academy of Science with advisory board made up of members from Nigeria Academy of Letters and Association of Nigerian Authors.

The Prize was initially $20,000. This was increased to $30,000 in 2006, and again to $50,000 in 2008. In 2011 the prize was increased to $100,000.

=== Years with no winner ===
Since its inception, the award is normally awarded in October. However, on three occasions the panel of judges were unable to select a winner, with no prize awarded in 2004, 2009 and 2015. In 2015, chair of the judging panel Ayo Banjo noted: "Unfortunately, the entries this year fall short of this expectation as each book was found to manifest incompetence in the use of language. Many of them showed very little or no evidence of good editing ... Hence, there will be no winner this year."

== See also ==
- Nigeria Prize for Science
- List of literary awards
- List of richest literary prizes
- Grand Prix of Literary Associations
- 9mobile Prize for Literature
- Wole Soyinka Prize for Literature in Africa
