= Demographics of Texas =

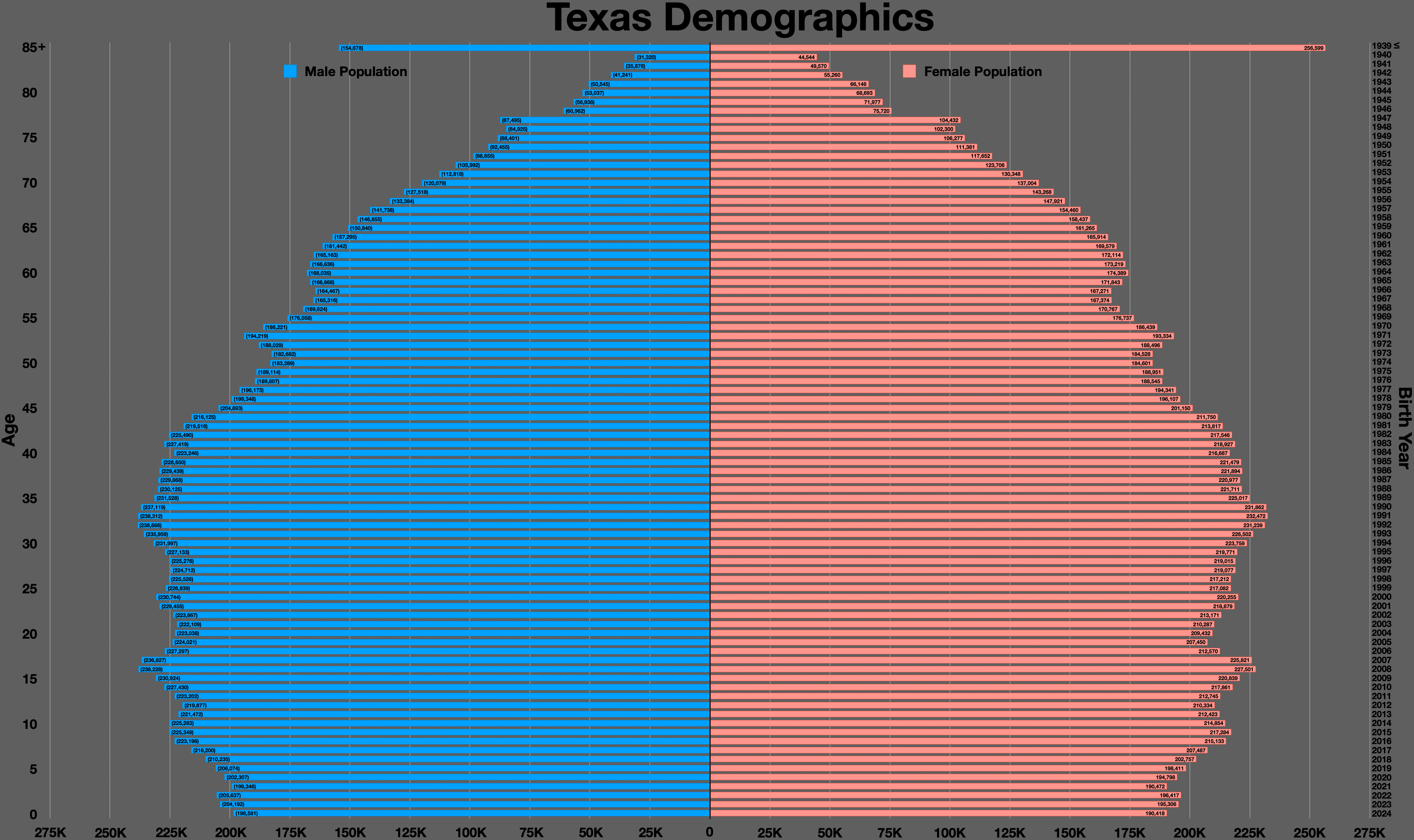
Texas population pyramid

According to the U.S. Census Bureau, as of 2023, Texas was the second largest state in population after California, with a population of 30,503,301, an increase of more than 1.3 million people, or 4.7%, since the 29,145,505 of the 2020 census. Its apportioned population in 2020 was 29,183,290. Since the beginning of the 21st century, the state of Texas has experienced strong population growth. Texas has many major cities and metropolitan areas, along with many towns and rural areas. Much of the population is concentrated in the major cities of Dallas–Fort Worth, Austin, San Antonio, Houston, McAllen, Brownsville, El Paso, and their corresponding metropolitan areas. The first four aforementioned main urban centers are also referred to as the Texas Triangle megaregion.

== Population ==
Historical population
| Census | Pop. | Note | %± |
|---|---|---|---|
| 1850 | 212,592 | | — |
| 1860 | 604,215 | | 184.2% |
| 1870 | 818,579 | | 35.5% |
| 1880 | 1,591,749 | | 94.5% |
| 1890 | 2,235,527 | | 40.4% |
| 1900 | 3,048,710 | | 36.4% |
| 1910 | 3,896,542 | | 27.8% |
| 1920 | 4,663,228 | | 19.7% |
| 1930 | 5,824,715 | | 24.9% |
| 1940 | 6,414,824 | | 10.1% |
| 1950 | 7,711,194 | | 20.2% |
| 1960 | 9,579,677 | | 24.2% |
| 1970 | 11,196,730 | | 16.9% |
| 1980 | 14,229,191 | | 27.1% |
| 1990 | 16,986,510 | | 19.4% |
| 2000 | 20,851,820 | | 22.8% |
| 2010 | 25,145,561 | | 20.6% |
| 2020 | 29,145,505 | | 15.9% |
| 2025 (est.) | 31,709,821 | | 8.8% |
1910–2020 census; 2025 estimate.

Texas is the second-largest U.S. state in population, after California. The state is also the most populous state in the South Central United States, and the most populous state in the South. Texas' population growth between 2000 and 2010 represents the highest population increase, by number of people, for any U.S. state during this time period.

At the 2020 United States census it was reported that Texas had a resident population of 29,145,505, a 15.9% increase since the 2010 U.S. census. Its apportioned population in 2020 was 29,183,290. At the 2010 census, Texas had a population of 25.1 million—an increase of 4.3 million since the year 2000, involving an increase in population in all three subcategories of population growth: natural increase (births minus deaths), net immigration, and net migration. Texas added almost 4 million people between the 2010 and 2020 census'.

Increasing by 470,708 people since July 2021, Texas was the largest-gaining state in the nation, reaching a total population of 30,029,572. By crossing the 30-million-population threshold, Texas joins California as the only states with a resident population above 30 million as of 2023. Growth in Texas was fueled by gains from all three components: net domestic migration (230,961), net international migration (118,614), and natural increase (118,159).

As of 2012, the state had an estimated 4.1 million foreign-born residents, constituting approximately 15% of the state population at the time. An estimated 1.7 million people were undocumented immigrants in 2014. The undocumented population of Texas decreased to an estimated 1,597,000 at the 2016 American Community Survey. Of the undocumented immigrant population, 960,000 have resided in Texas from less than 5 up to 14 years. An estimated 637,000 lived in Texas from 15 to 19 and 20 years or more. The undocumented immigrant population rebounded to 1,730,000 in 2018.

The center of population of Texas is located at 30.905244°N 97.365594°W in Bell County, in the town of Holland.

=== Net domestic migration ===
| Year | In-migrants | Out-migrants | Net migration |
|---|---|---|---|
| 2010 | 486,558 | 411,641 | 74,917 |
| 2011 | 514,726 | 404,839 | 109,887 |
| 2012 | 507,752 | 402,187 | 105,565 |
| 2013 | 548,034 | 409,977 | 138,057 |
| 2014 | 538,572 | 435,107 | 103,465 |
| 2015 | 553,032 | 445,343 | 107,689 |
| 2016 | 531,996 | 444,340 | 87,656 |
| 2017 | 524,511 | 467,338 | 57,173 |
| 2018 | 563,945 | 462,140 | 101,805 |
| 2019 | 559,661 | 453,015 | 106,646 |

== Race, ethnicity, and tribal affiliation ==
=== Racial and ethnic composition ===
Texas – Racial and ethnic composition Note: the US Census treats Hispanic/Latino as an ethnic category. This table excludes Latinos from the racial categories and assigns them to a separate category. Hispanics/Latinos may be of any race.
| Race / Ethnicity (NH = Non-Hispanic) | Pop 1980 | Pop 1990 | Pop 2000 | Pop 2010 | Pop 2020 | % 1980 | % 1990 | % 2000 | % 2010 | % 2020 |
|---|---|---|---|---|---|---|---|---|---|---|
| White alone (NH) | 9,350,297 | 10,291,680 | 10,933,313 | 11,397,345 | 11,584,597 | 65.71% | 60.59% | 52.43% | 45.33% | 39.75% |
| Black or African American alone (NH) | 1,692,562 | 1,976,360 | 2,364,255 | 2,886,825 | 3,444,712 | 11.89% | 11.63% | 11.34% | 11.48% | 11.82% |
| Native American or Alaska Native alone (NH) | 40,045 | 52,803 | 68,859 | 80,586 | 85,425 | 0.28% | 0.31% | 0.33% | 0.32% | 0.29% |
| Asian alone (NH) | 120,224 | 303,825 | 554,445 | 948,426 | 1,561,518 | 0.84% | 1.79% | 2.66% | 3.77% | 5.36% |
| Native Hawaiian or Pacific Islander alone (NH) | x | x | 10,757 | 17,920 | 27,857 | x | x | 0.05% | 0.07% | 0.10% |
| Other race alone (NH) | 40,239 | 21,937 | 19,958 | 33,980 | 113,584 | 0.28% | 0.13% | 0.10% | 0.14% | 0.39% |
| Mixed race or Multiracial (NH) | x | x | 230,567 | 319,558 | 886,095 | x | x | 1.11% | 1.27% | 3.04% |
| Hispanic or Latino (any race) | 2,985,824 | 4,339,905 | 6,669,666 | 9,460,921 | 11,441,717 | 20.98% | 25.55% | 31.99% | 37.62% | 39.26% |
| Total | 14,229,191 | 16,986,510 | 20,851,820 | 25,145,561 | 29,145,505 | 100.00% | 100.00% | 100.00% | 100.00% | 100.00% |

Texas racial breakdown of population (1900–2023)
| Racial composition | 1850 | 1900 | 1910 | 1920 | 1930 | 1940 | 1950 | 1960 | 1970 | 1980 | 1990 | 2000 | 2010 | 2020 |
|---|---|---|---|---|---|---|---|---|---|---|---|---|---|---|
| White | 72.5% | 79.6% | 82.2% | 84.0% | 85.3% | 85.5% | 87.2% | 87.4% | 86.8% | 78.7% | 75.2% | 71.0% | 70.4% | 50.1% |
| Non-Hispanic White | 67.2% | – | – | – | – | 74.1% | – | – | 71.0% | 65.7% | 60.6% | 52.4% | 45.3% | 39.7% |
| Black | 27.5% | 20.4% | 17.7% | 15.9% | 14.7% | 14.4% | 12.7% | 12.4% | 12.5% | 12.0% | 11.9% | 11.5% | 11.9% | 12.2% |
| Hispanic (of any race) | 5.3% | – | 7.1% | 9.9% | 13.8% | 11.5% | 13.3% | 14.8% | 16.4% | 21.0% | 25.5% | 32.0% | 37.6% | 39.3% |
| Asian | – | – | – | – | – | – | 0.1% | 0.1% | 0.2% | 0.8% | 1.9% | 2.7% | 3.8% | 5.4% |
| Native Hawaiian and other Pacific Islander | – | – | – | – | – | – | 0.1% | 0.1% | 0.2% | 0.8% | 1.9% | 0.1% | 0.1% | 0.1% |
| Native | – | – | – | – | – | – | – | 0.1% | 0.2% | 0.3% | 0.4% | 0.6% | 0.7% | 1.0% |
| Other race | – | – | – | – | – | – | – | – | 0.4% | 8.2% | 10.6% | 11.7% | 10.5% | 13.6% |
| Two or more races | – | – | – | – | – | – | – | – | – | | – | 2.5% | 2.7% | 17.6% |

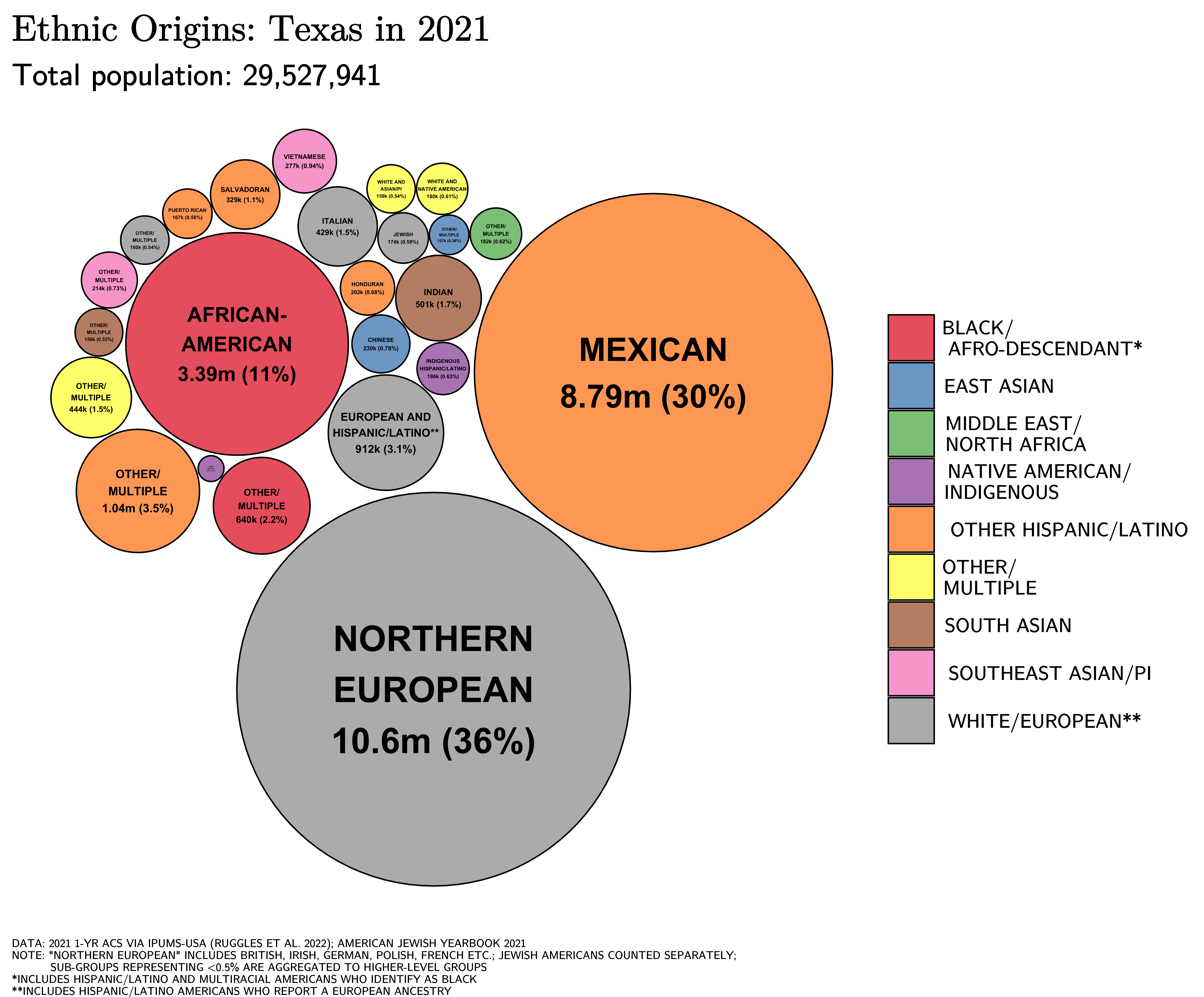
Ethnic origins in Texas

==== 2025 American Community Survey one-year estimates ====
| Racial Makeup of Texas (2025): 1. White alone (46.9%); 2. Black alone (12.1%); 3. Native American alone (0.97%); 4. Asian Alone (6.39%); 5. Pacific Islander Alone (0.15%); 6. Other race alone (9.35%); 7. Two or more races (24.2%) | Racial/Ethnic Makeup of Texas excluding Hispanics from racial categories (2025); NH=Non-Hispanic: 1. White NH (36.5%); 2. Black NH (11.7%); 3. Native American NH (0.32%); 4. Asian NH (6.31%); 5. Pacific Islander NH (0.12%); 6. Other race NH (0.44%); 7. Two or more races NH (3.77%); 8. Hispanic Any Race (40.9%) | Racial Makeup of Hispanics in Texas (2025): 1. White alone (25.5%); 2. Black alone (0.95%); 3. Native American alone (1.59%); 4. Asian Alone (0.20%); 5. Pacific Islander Alone (0.07%); 6. Other race alone (21.8%); 7. Two or more races (49.9%) |

In 2021, 40.2% of the population was Hispanic and Latino American of any race, 39.3% non-Hispanic white, 11.6% Black or African American, 1.5% American Indian or Alaska Native, 5.1% Asian, 0.2% Native Hawaiian or other Pacific Islander, 0.4% some other race, and 3.1% two or more races. At the 2020 census, the racial and ethnic composition of the state was 42.5% white (39.7% non-Hispanic white), 11.8% Black or African American, 5.4% Asian, 0.3% American Indian and Alaska Native, 0.1% Native Hawaiian and other Pacific Islander, 13.6% some other race, 17.6% two or more races, and 39.3% Hispanic and Latin American of any race.

In 2015 non-Hispanic whites made up 11,505,371 (41.9%) of the population, followed by Black Americans at 3,171,043 (11.5%); other races 1,793,580 (6.5%); and Hispanics and Latinos (of any race) 10,999,120 (40.0%). At the 2010 United States census, the racial composition of Texas was the following: White American 70.4 percent, (Non-Hispanic whites 45.3 percent), Black or African American 11.8 percent, American Indian 0.7 percent, Asian 3.8 percent (1.0 percent Indian, 0.8 percent Vietnamese, 0.6 percent Chinese, 0.4 percent Filipino, 0.3 percent Korean, 0.1 percent Japanese, 0.6 percent other Asian), Pacific Islander 0.1 percent, some other race 10.5 percent, and two or more races 2.7 percent. In addition, 37.6 percent of the population was Hispanic or Latino (of any race) (31.6 percent Mexican, 0.9 percent Salvadoran, 0.5 percent Puerto Rican, 0.4 percent Honduran, 0.3 percent Guatemalan 0.3 percent Spaniard, 0.2 percent Colombian, 0.2 percent Cuban). In 2011, 69.8% of the population of Texas younger than age 1 were minorities (meaning they had at least one parent who was not non-Hispanic white).

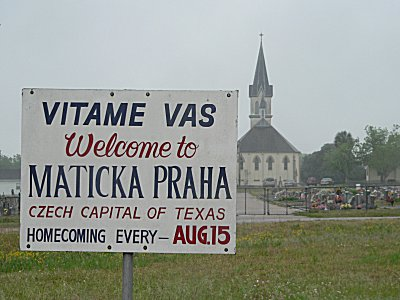
Welcome sign in Praha

=== Hispanic or Latino Americans ===
Hispanics and Latinos are the largest ethnic group in Texas, outnumbering non-Hispanic European Americans as of 2021. More than 11 million people claim Hispanic or Latin American ethnicity. This group forms over 37 percent of Texas's population. People of Mexican descent alone number over 9 million, and made up 31.7 percent of the population. The vast majority of the Hispanic/Latino population in the state is of Mexican descent, the next two largest groups are Salvadorans and Puerto Ricans. There are 385,716 Salvadorans and 269,448 Puerto Ricans in Texas. Other groups with large numbers in Texas include Hondurans, Guatemalans, Nicaraguans, and Cubans, among others. Historically, Hispanics in Texas were more likely than in some other states (such as California) to identify as white; according to the 2010 U.S. census, Texas was home to 6,304,207 White Hispanics and only 2,594,206 Hispanics of "some other race" (usually mestizo), compared to a majority of Hispanics identifying as "some other race" in California. However, self-identification among Hispanics has changed significantly from 2010 to 2020, partly due to changes in census methodology. According to the 2023 American Community Survey, only 2,740,386 Hispanics in Texas identified as White alone, while 9,035,783 Hispanics identified as "some other race" or "two or more races".

=== White or European Americans ===
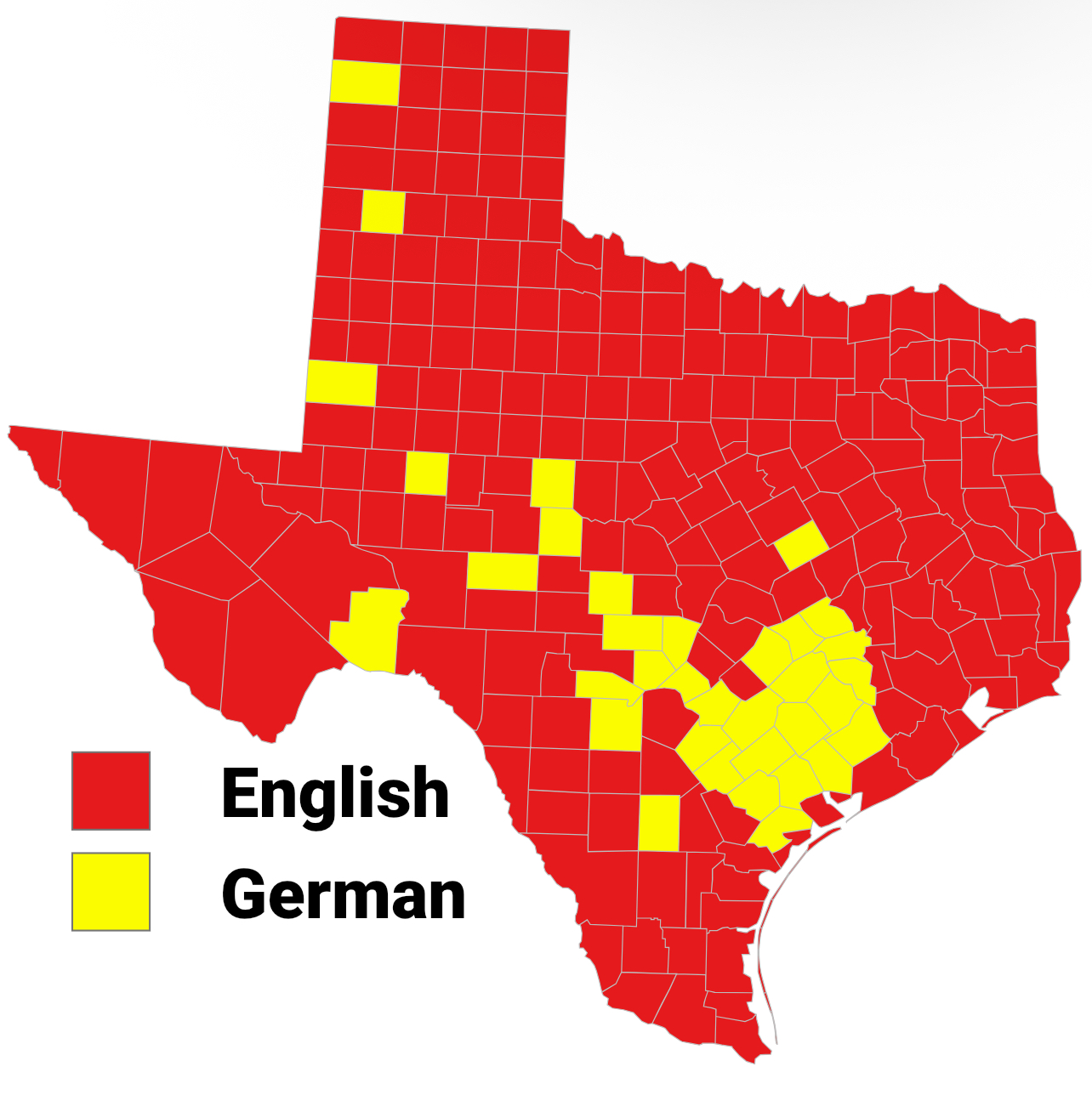
Largest white alone or any combination ethnic origin by county in Texas, per the 2020 census

In 1980, German, Irish, and English Americans were the three largest European ancestry groups in Texas. German Americans made up 11.3 percent of the population and numbered over 2.7 million members. Irish Americans made up 8.2 percent of the population and numbered over 1.9 million. There are roughly over 600,000 French Americans, 472,000 Italian Americans, 369,161 Scottish Americans, and 288,610 Polish Americans residing in Texas; these four ethnic groups made up 2.5 percent, 2.0 percent, 1.5 percent, and 1.0 percent of the population respectively. In the 1980 United States census the largest ancestry group reported in Texas was English with 3,083,323 Texans citing they were of English or mostly English ancestry, making them 27 percent of the state at the time. Their ancestry primarily goes back to the original thirteen colonies (the census of 1790 gives 48% of the population of English ancestry, together with 12% Scots and Scots-Irish, 4.5% other Irish, and 3% Welsh, for a total of 67.5% British and Irish; 13% were German, Swiss, Dutch, and French Huguenots; 19% were African American), thus many of them today identify as "American" in ancestry, though they are of predominantly British stock. In 2012 there were nearly 200,000 Czech Americans living in Texas, the largest number of any state.

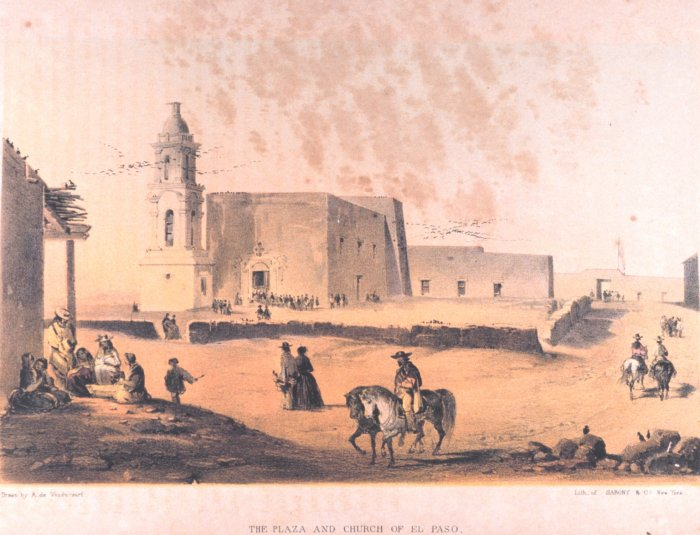
El Paso was founded by Spanish settlers in 1659.

=== Black or African Americans ===
African Americans are a racial minority in Texas. Their proportion of the population has declined since the early 20th century after many left the state in the Great Migration. Blacks of both Hispanic and non-Hispanic origin made up 11.5 percent of the population in 2015; blacks of non-Hispanic origin formed 11.3 percent of the populace. African Americans of both Hispanic and non-Hispanic origin numbered at roughly 2.7 million individuals, increasing in 2018 to 3,908,287. The majority of the Black and African American population of Texas lives in the Greater Houston, Dallas–Fort Worth, San Antonio, Galveston, Tyler and Beaumont–Port Arthur metropolitan areas.

=== Native Americans ===
Native Americans are a smaller minority in the state. Native Americans made up 0.5 percent of Texas's population and number over 118,000 individuals as of 2015. Native Americans of non-Hispanic origin made up 0.3 percent of the population and number over 75,000 individuals. Cherokee made up 0.1 percent of the population, and numbered over 19,400. In contrast, only 583 identified as Chippewa.

=== Asian Americans ===
Asian Americans are a sizable minority group in Texas. Americans of Asian descent formed 4.5 percent of the population in 2015. They total more than 1.2 million individuals. Over 200,000 Indian Americans make Texas their home. Texas is also home to more than 187,000 Vietnamese and 136,000 Chinese. In addition to 92,000 Filipinos and 62,000 Koreans, there are 18,000 Japanese Americans living in the state. Lastly, more than 111,000 people are of other Asian ancestry groups, such as Cambodian, Thai, and Hmong. Sugar Land, a city within the Houston metropolitan area, and Plano, within the Dallas–Fort Worth metropolitan area, both have high concentrations of ethnic Chinese and Korean residents. The Houston and Dallas areas, and to a lesser extent, the Austin metropolitan area, all contain substantial Vietnamese communities.

=== Pacific Islander Americans ===
Americans with origins from the Pacific Islands are the smallest minority in Texas. According to the 2019 American Community Survey, only 21,484 Texans are Pacific Islanders. The city of Euless, a suburb of Fort Worth, contains a sizable population of Tongan Americans, at nearly 900 people, over one percent of the city's population. Killeen has a sufficient population of Samoans and Guamanian, and people of Pacific Islander descent surpass one percent of the city's population.

=== Multiracial Americans ===
Multiracial individuals are also a visible minority in Texas. People identifying as multiracial form 2.9 percent of the population, and number over 800,000 people. Over 80,000 Texans claim African and European heritage. People of European and American Indian ancestry number over 108,800. People of European and Asian ancestry number over 57,600. People of African and Native American ancestry were even smaller in number at 15,300.

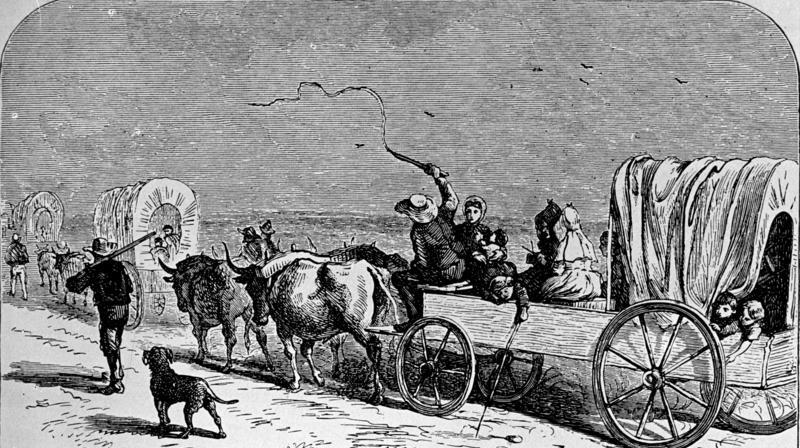
German trek on its way to New Braunfels

German descendants inhabit much of central and southeast-central Texas. Over one-third of Texas residents are of Hispanic origin; while many have recently arrived, some Tejanos have ancestors with multi-generational ties to 18th century Texas. The African American population in Texas is increasing due to the New Great Migration. In addition to the descendants of the state's former slave population, many African American college graduates have come to the state for work recently in the New Great Migration. Since the early 21st century, the Asian population in Texas has grown—primarily in Houston and Dallas. Other communities with a significantly growing Asian American population is in Austin, Corpus Christi, San Antonio, and the Sharyland area next to McAllen, Texas.

Three federally recognized Native American tribes in Texas are headquartered and have Indian reservations in Texas: the Alabama–Coushatta Tribe of Texas, the Kickapoo Traditional Tribe of Texas, and the Ysleta del Sur Pueblo. There are 29,000 Cherokee Nation citizens, the largest number of any state outside of Oklahoma.

In 2010, 49% of all Texas births were Hispanics; 35% were non-Hispanic whites; 11.5% were non-Hispanic blacks, and 4.3 percent were Asians/Pacific Islanders. Based on U.S. Census Bureau data released in February 2011, for the first time in recent history, Texas's non-Hispanic white population is below 50% (45%) and Hispanics grew to 38%. Between 2000 and 2010, the total population growth by 20.6%, but Hispanics and Latin Americans growth by 65%, whereas non-Hispanic whites grew by only 4.2%. Texas has the fifth highest rate of teenage births in the nation and a plurality of these are to Hispanics or Latinos.

Romani Americans are present in Texas. In Texas, the two main Roma subgroups are Vlax and Romanichal. They mainly live in Houston and Fort Worth, though significant numbers of Romani families live in Dallas, San Antonio, Austin, and El Paso.

There is an Italian community in Texas.

== Vital statistics ==
Source: Centers for Disease Control and Prevention (CDC)

| Year | Population | Live births | Deaths | Natural change | Crude birth rate (per 1,000) | Crude death rate (per 1,000) | Natural change (per 1,000) | Crude migration change (per 1,000) |
|---|---|---|---|---|---|---|---|---|
| 1976 | 12,904,089 | 218,746 | 100,760 | 117,986 | 17.0 | 7.8 | 9.1 | |
| 1977 | 13,193,050 | 234,985 | 100,185 | 134,800 | 17.8 | 7.6 | 10.2 | |
| 1978 | 13,500,429 | 236,952 | 103,845 | 133,107 | 17.6 | 7.7 | 9.9 | |
| 1979 | 13,888,371 | 254,508 | 104,821 | 149,687 | 18.3 | 7.5 | 10.8 | |
| 1980 | 14,338,208 | 273,580 | 108,160 | 165,420 | 19.1 | 7.5 | 11.5 | |
| 1981 | 14,746,318 | 281,651 | 110,548 | 171,103 | 19.1 | 7.5 | 11.6 | |
| 1982 | 15,331,415 | 303,016 | 111,319 | 191,697 | 19.8 | 7.3 | 12.5 | |
| 1983 | 15,751,676 | 299,650 | 114,813 | 184,837 | 19.0 | 7.3 | 11.7 | |
| 1984 | 16,007,086 | 303,569 | 117,021 | 186,548 | 19.0 | 7.3 | 11.7 | |
| 1985 | 16,272,734 | 312,598 | 118,336 | 194,262 | 19.2 | 7.3 | 11.9 | |
| 1986 | 16,561,113 | 311,006 | 118,747 | 192,259 | 18.8 | 7.2 | 11.6 | |
| 1987 | 16,621,791 | 305,520 | 121,400 | 184,120 | 18.4 | 7.3 | 11.1 | |
| 1988 | 16,667,022 | 307,563 | 124,329 | 183,234 | 18.5 | 7.5 | 11.0 | |
| 1989 | 16,806,735 | 312,279 | 124,878 | 187,401 | 18.6 | 7.4 | 11.2 | |
| 1990 | 17,044,714 | 321,041 | 125,479 | 195,562 | 18.8 | 7.4 | 11.5 | |
| 1991 | 17,339,904 | 322,065 | 126,795 | 195,270 | 18.6 | 7.3 | 11.3 | |
| 1992 | 17,650,479 | 320,845 | 129,108 | 191,737 | 18.2 | 7.3 | 10.9 | |
| 1993 | 17,996,764 | 326,257 | 134,664 | 191,593 | 18.1 | 7.5 | 10.6 | |
| 1994 | 18,338,319 | 321,114 | 136,079 | 185,035 | 17.5 | 7.4 | 10.1 | |
| 1995 | 18,679,706 | 322,753 | 137,821 | 184,932 | 17.3 | 7.4 | 9.9 | |
| 1996 | 19,006,240 | 327,163 | 139,962 | 187,201 | 17.2 | 7.4 | 9.8 | |
| 1997 | 19,355,427 | 333,974 | 142,776 | 191,198 | 17.3 | 7.4 | 9.9 | |
| 1998 | 19,712,389 | 346,101 | 142,605 | 203,496 | 17.6 | 7.2 | 10.3 | |
| 1999 | 20,044,141 | 349,245 | 146,858 | 202,387 | 17.4 | 7.3 | 10.1 | |
| 2000 | 20,944,499 | 373,414 | 149,939 | 223,475 | 17.8 | 7.2 | 10.6 | |
| 2001 | 21,319,622 | 366,410 | 152,779 | 213,631 | 17.2 | 7.2 | 10.0 | 7.6 |
| 2002 | 21,690,325 | 372,450 | 155,524 | 216,926 | 17.2 | 7.2 | 10.0 | 7.1 |
| 2003 | 22,030,931 | 377,476 | 154,870 | 222,606 | 17.1 | 7.0 | 10.1 | 5.4 |
| 2004 | 22,394,023 | 381,293 | 152,870 | 228,423 | 17.0 | 6.8 | 10.2 | 6.0 |
| 2005 | 22,778,123 | 385,915 | 156,457 | 229,458 | 16.9 | 6.9 | 10.0 | 6.8 |
| 2006 | 23,359,580 | 399,603 | 157,150 | 242,453 | 17.1 | 6.7 | 10.4 | 14.5 |
| 2007 | 23,831,983 | 407,625 | 160,548 | 247,077 | 17.1 | 6.7 | 10.4 | 9.5 |
| 2008 | 24,309,039 | 405,554 | 164,914 | 240,640 | 16.7 | 6.8 | 9.9 | 9.7 |
| 2009 | 24,801,761 | 401,977 | 163,249 | 238,728 | 16.2 | 6.6 | 9.6 | 10.2 |
| 2010 | 25,238,386 | 386,188 | 166,527 | 219,661 | 15.3 | 6.6 | 8.7 | 8.6 |
| 2011 | 25,627,909 | 377,445 | 168,640 | 208,805 | 14.7 | 6.6 | 8.1 | 7.1 |
| 2012 | 26,052,403 | 382,727 | 174,187 | 208,540 | 14.7 | 6.7 | 8.0 | 8.3 |
| 2013 | 26,433,846 | 387,340 | 179,183 | 208,157 | 14.7 | 6.8 | 7.9 | 6.6 |
| 2014 | 26,903,208 | 399,766 | 183,912 | 215,854 | 14.9 | 6.8 | 8.1 | 9.4 |
| 2015 | 27,394,564 | 403,618 | 189,654 | 213,964 | 14.7 | 6.9 | 7.8 | 10.1 |
| 2016 | 27,825,975 | 398,047 | 191,966 | 206,081 | 14.3 | 6.9 | 7.4 | 8.1 |
| 2017 | 28,188,852 | 382,050 | 198,106 | 183,944 | 13.6 | 7.0 | 6.6 | 6.3 |
| 2018 | 28,508,309 | 378,624 | 202,211 | 176,413 | 13.3 | 7.1 | 6.2 | 5.0 |
| 2019 | 28,856,455 | 377,599 | 203,362 | 174,237 | 13.1 | 7.0 | 6.1 | 6.0 |
| 2020 | 29,237,895 | 368,190 | 250,339 | 117,851 | 12.6 | 8.6 | 4.0 | 9.0 |
| 2021 | 29,572,672 | 373,594 | 267,651 | 105,943 | 12.6 | 9.1 | 3.5 | 7.7 |
| 2022 | 30,118,002 | 389,741 | 241,441 | 148,300 | 12.9 | 8.0 | 4.9 | 13.2 |
| 2023 | 30,719,247 | 387,636 | 229,122 | 158,514 | 12.6 | 7.5 | 5.1 | 14.4 |
| 2024 | 31,318,578 | 390,828 | 229,560 | 161,268 | 12.5 | 7.3 | 5.2 | 14.0 |
| 2025 | 31,709,821 | 384,611 | 232,580 | 152,031 | 12.1 | 7.3 | 4.8 | 7.5 |

Note: Births in table don't add up, because Hispanics are counted both by their ethnicity and by their race, giving a higher overall number.

Live births by single race/ethnicity of mother
| Race | 2014 | 2015 | 2016 | 2017 | 2018 | 2019 | 2020 | 2021 | 2022 | 2023 | 2024 |
|---|---|---|---|---|---|---|---|---|---|---|---|
| White | 140,992 (35.3%) | 140,553 (34.8%) | 134,262 (33.7%) | 127,533 (33.4%) | 125,549 (33.2%) | 124,678 (33.0%) | 120,329 (32.7%) | 123,452 (33.0%) | 121,868 (31.3%) | 119,189 (30.7%) | 118,491 (30.3%) |
| Black | 51,274 (12.4%) | 53,144 (13.2%) | 48,562 (12.2%) | 48,642 (12.6%) | 48,144 (12.7%) | 47,326 (12.5%) | 46,643 (12.7%) | 46,371 (12.4%) | 47,804 (12.3%) | 47,140 (12.2%) | 44,543 (11.4%) |
| Asian | 20,844 (5.2%) | 21,775 (5.4%) | 20,889 (5.2%) | 20,385 (5.3%) | 19,850 (5.2%) | 19,930 (5.3%) | 19,064 (5.2%) | 19,424 (5.2%) | 20,794 (5.3%) | 21,694 (5.6%) | 23,546 (6.0%) |
| Pacific Islander | ... | ... | 498 (0.1%) | 510 (0.1%) | 487 (0.1%) | 566 (0.1%) | 543 (0.1%) | 571 (0.1%) | 579 (0.1%) | 607 (0.1%) | 608 (0.1%) |
| American Indian | 1,168 (0.3%) | 1,270 (0.3%) | 782 (0.2%) | 664 (0.2%) | 721 (0.2%) | 689 (0.2%) | 638 (0.2%) | 610 (0.2%) | 685 (0.2%) | 630 (0.2%) | 584 (0.1%) |
| Hispanic (any race) | 189,462 (47.4%) | 191,157 (47.4%) | 188,393 (47.3%) | 180,216 (47.2%) | 179,142 (47.3%) | 179,689 (47.6%) | 175,940 (47.8%) | 177,386 (47.5%) | 190,889 (49.0%) | 191,967 (49.5%) | 195,948 (50.1%) |
| Total | 399,766 (100%) | 403,618 (100%) | 398,047 (100%) | 382,050 (100%) | 378,624 (100%) | 377,599 (100%) | 368,190 (100%) | 373,594 (100%) | 389,741 (100%) | 387,945 (100%) | 390,828 (100%) |

- Since 2016, data for births of White Hispanic origin are not collected, but included in one Hispanic group; persons of Hispanic origin may be of any race.

== Languages ==
The most common American English accent spoken was Texan English, which is a mix of Southern American English and Western American English dialects. Louisiana Creole language is spoken mostly in Southeast Texas. Chicano English is also widely spoken, as well as African American Vernacular English, and General American English.

Top 10 non-English languages spoken in Texas
| Language | Percentage of population (as of 2010) |
|---|---|
| Spanish | 29.21% |
| Vietnamese | 0.75% |
| Chinese (including Mandarin and Cantonese) | 0.56% |
| German | 0.33% |
| Tagalog | 0.29% |
| French | 0.25% |
| Korean and Urdu (tied) | 0.24% |
| Hindi | 0.23% |
| Arabic | 0.21% |
| Niger-Congo languages of West Africa (Ibo, Kru, and Yoruba) | 0.15% |

In 2010, 65.80% (14,740,304) of Texas residents age 5 and older spoke English at home as a primary language, while 29.21% (6,543,702) spoke Spanish, 0.75% (168,886) Vietnamese, and Chinese (which includes Cantonese and Mandarin) was spoken as a main language by 0.56% (122,921) of the population over the age of five. Other languages spoken include German (including Texas German) by 0.33% (73,137,) Tagalog with 0.29% (73,137) speakers, and French (including Cajun French) was spoken by 0.25% (55,773) of Texans. In total, 34.20% (7,660,406) of Texas's population age 5 and older spoke a mother language other than English.

The 2019 American Community Survey estimated 64.4% of the population spoke only English, and 35.6% spoke a language other than English. Roughly 30% of the total population spoke Spanish. Approximately 50,742 Texans spoke French or a French-creole language. German and other West Germanic languages were spoken by 47,098 residents; Russian, Polish, and other Slavic languages by 27,956; Korean by 31,581; Chinese 22,616; Vietnamese 81,022; Tagalog 43,360; and Arabic by 26,281 Texans.

== Religion ==
Religion in Texas (2014)
1. Protestantism (50.0%)
2. Catholicism (23.0%)
3. Mormonism (1.00%)
4. Other Christians (3.00%)
5. No religion (18.0%)
6. Judaism (1.00%)
7. Other religion (3.00%)
8. No response given/Unknown (1.00%)

The majority of Texas's population have been and remain predominantly Christian (75.5%). Influenced by Spanish Catholic and American Protestant missionary work. Texas's large Christian population is also influenced due to its location within the Bible Belt. The following largest groups were the irreligious (20%), Judaism (1%), Islam (1%), Buddhism (1%) and Hinduism, and other religions at less than 1 percent each.

Religious affiliation (2020)
| Christian | 75.5% |
| Catholic | 28% |
| Protestant | 47% |
| Other Christian | 0.5% |
| Unaffiliated | 20% |
| Jewish | 1% |
| Muslim | 1% |
| Buddhist | 1% |
| Other faiths | 5% |

The largest Christian denomination as of 2014 has been the Catholic Church, per the Pew Research Center at 23% of the population, though Protestants altogether made up 50% of the Christian population in 2014; in another study by the Public Religion Research Institute in 2020, the Catholic Church's membership increased to encompassing 28% of the population identifying with a religious or spiritual belief. At the 2020 Association of Religion Data Archives study, there were 5,905,142 Catholics in the state. The largest Catholic jurisdictions in Texas are the Archdiocese of Galveston-Houston—the first and oldest Latin Church diocese in Texas—the dioceses of Dallas, Fort Worth, and the Archdiocese of San Antonio.

Among Protestant Christians, which as a whole declined to 47% of the population in a separate study by the Public Religion Research Institute, predominantly-white Evangelical Protestantism declined to 14% of the Protestant Christian population. Mainline Protestants in contrast made up 15% of Protestant Texas. Hispanic or Latino American-dominated Protestant churches and historically Black or African American Protestantism grew to a collective 13% of the Protestant population.

In contrast, Evangelical Protestants altogether were 31% of the population at the Pew Research Center's 2014 study, and Baptists were the largest Evangelical tradition (14%); per the 2014 study, they made up the second largest Mainline Protestant group behind Methodists (4%). Nondenominational and interdenominational Christians were the second largest Evangelical group (7%) followed by Pentecostals (4%). The largest Evangelical Baptists in the state were the Southern Baptist Convention (9%) and independent Baptists (3%). The Assemblies of God made the largest Evangelical Pentecostal denomination in 2014. Among Mainline Protestants, the United Methodist Church was the largest denomination (4%) and the American Baptist Churches USA comprised the second largest Mainline Protestant group (2%).

According to the Pew Research Center in 2014, the largest historically African American Christian denominations were the National Baptist Convention (USA) and the Church of God in Christ. Black Methodists and other Christians made up less than 1 percent each of the Christian demographic. Other Christians made up 1 percent of the total Christian population, and the Eastern and Oriental Orthodox formed less than 1 percent of the statewide Christian populace. The Church of Jesus Christ of Latter-Day Saints is the largest nontrinitarian Christian group in Texas alongside the Jehovah's Witnesses.

The Association of Religion Data Archives in 2020 determined Southern Baptists numbered 3,319,962; non-denominational Protestants 2,405,786 (including Christian Churches and Churches of Christ, and the Churches of Christ altogether numbering 2,758,353); and United Methodists 938,399 as the most numerous Protestant groups in the state. Baptists altogether (Southern Baptists, American Baptist Associates, American Baptists, Full Gospel Baptists, General Baptists, Free Will Baptists, National Baptists, National Baptists of America, National Missionary Baptists, National Primitive Baptists, and Progressive National Baptists) numbered 3,837,306; Methodists within United Methodism, the AME, AME Zion, CME, and the Free Methodist Church numbered up 1,026,453 Texans.

In 2020, the same study numbered 425,038 Pentecostals spread among the Assemblies of God, Church of God (Cleveland), and Church of God in Christ. Nontrinitarian or Oneness Pentecostals numbered 7,042 among Bible Way Church of Our Lord Jesus Christ, COOLJC, and the Pentecostal Assemblies of the World. Other Christians including the Eastern and Oriental Orthodox numbered 55,329 altogether, and Episcopalians numbered 134,318 although the Anglican Catholic Church, Anglican Church in America, Anglican Church in North America, Anglican Province of America, and Holy Catholic Church Anglican Rite had a collective presence in 114 churches.

Non-Christian faiths accounted for 4% of the religious population in 2014, and 5% in 2020 per the Pew Research Center and Public Religion Research Institute. Adherents of many other religions reside predominantly in the urban centers of Texas. Judaism, Islam, and Buddhism were tied as the second largest religion as of 2014 and 2020. In 2014, 18% of the state's population were religiously unaffiliated. Of the unaffiliated in 2014, an estimated 2% were atheists and 3% agnostic.

In 1990, the Islamic population was about 140,000 with more recent figures putting the current number of Muslims between 350,000 and 400,000 as of 2012. The Association of Religion Data Archives estimated there were 313,209 Muslims as of 2020. Texas is the fifth-largest Muslim-populated state in the country. The Jewish population was around 128,000 in 2008. In 2020, the Jewish population grew to over 176,000. According to ARDA's 2020 study, there were 43 Chabad synagogues; 17,513 Conservative Jews; 8,110 Orthodox Jews; and 31,378 Reform Jews. Around 146,000 adherents of religions such as Hinduism and Sikhism lived in Texas as of 2004. By 2020, there were 112,153 Hindus and 20 Sikh gurdwaras; 60,882 Texans adhered to Buddhism.

== Settlements ==
As of 2010, the state has three cities with populations exceeding one million: Houston, San Antonio, and Dallas. These three rank among the 10 most populous cities of the United States. As of 2020, six Texas cities had populations greater than 600,000 people. Austin, Fort Worth, and El Paso are among the 20 largest U.S. cities. Texas has four metropolitan areas with populations greater than a million: Dallas–Fort Worth–Arlington, Houston–Sugar Land–Baytown, San Antonio–New Braunfels, and Austin–Round Rock–San Marcos. The Dallas–Fort Worth and Houston metropolitan areas numbered about 7.5 million and 7 million residents as of 2019.

Largest city in Texas by year
| Year(s) | City |
|---|---|
| 1850–1860 | Galveston |
| 1860–1870 | San Antonio |
| 1870–1890 | Galveston |
| 1890–1900 | Dallas |
| 1900–1930 | San Antonio |
| 1930–present | Houston |

Three interstate highways—I-35 to the west (Dallas–Fort Worth to San Antonio, with Austin in between), I-45 to the east (Dallas to Houston), and I-10 to the south (San Antonio to Houston) define the Texas Triangle megaregion. The region of 60,000 square miles (160,000 km^{2}) contains most of the state's largest cities and metropolitan areas as well as 17 million people, nearly 75 percent of Texas's total population. Houston and Dallas have been recognized as beta world cities. These cities are spread out amongst the state. Texas has 254 counties, which is more than any other state by 95 (Georgia).

In contrast to the cities, unincorporated rural settlements known as colonias often lack basic infrastructure and are marked by poverty. The office of the Texas Attorney General stated, in 2011, that Texas had about 2,294 colonias and estimates about 500,000 lived in the colonias. Hidalgo County, as of 2011, has the largest number of colonias. Texas has the largest number of people of all states, living in colonias.

Largest cities or towns in Texas 2021 U.S. Census Bureau Estimate
| Rank | Name | County | Pop. |
|---|---|---|---|
| 1 | Houston | Harris | 2,288,250 |
| 2 | San Antonio | Bexar | 1,451,853 |
| 3 | Dallas | Dallas | 1,288,457 |
| 4 | Austin | Travis | 964,177 |
| 5 | Fort Worth | Tarrant | 935,508 |
| 6 | El Paso | El Paso | 678,415 |
| 7 | Arlington | Tarrant | 392,786 |
| 8 | Corpus Christi | Nueces | 317,773 |
| 9 | Plano | Collin | 288,253 |
| 10 | Lubbock | Lubbock | 260,993 |

== Immigration ==
This table includes top sources of immigration to Texas

| # | Country | Number |
|---|---|---|
| 1 | Mexico | 2,392,319 |
| 2 | India | 327,368 |
| 3 | El Salvador | 223,016 |
| 4 | Vietnam | 189,966 |
| 5 | Honduras | 162,456 |
| 6 | China | 155,131 |
| 7 | Philippines | 108,019 |
| 8 | Nigeria | 102,431 |
| 9 | Guatemala | 91,831 |
| 10 | Venezuela | 85,770 |
| 11 | Cuba | 72,034 |
| 12 | Pakistan | 65,084 |
| 13 | Colombia | 63,777 |
| 14 | Canada | 55,821 |
| 15 | United Kingdom | 52,822 |
| 16 | Germany | 39,116 |
| 17 | Iran | 31,692 |
| 18 | Nepal | 29,599 |
| 19 | Brazil | 29,052 |
| 20 | Taiwan | 27,720 |
| 21 | Iraq | 27,590 |
| 22 | Ethiopia | 26,073 |
| 23 | Peru | 24,114 |
| 24 | Kenya | 22,912 |
| 25 | Nicaragua | 21,985 |

== See also ==
- German Texan
- History of African-Americans in Texas
- History of Mexican-Americans in Texas
- Jewish history in Texas
- History of African Americans in Houston
- History of African Americans in Dallas-Ft. Worth
- History of African Americans in San Antonio
- History of Mexican Americans in Houston
- History of Mexican Americans in Dallas–Fort Worth
- History of Nigerian Americans in Dallas–Fort Worth
- History of Nigerian Americans in San Antonio
- Native American tribes in Texas
