= History of African Americans in Texas =

African Americans in Texas
Total population
- 3,444,712 (2020)

Regions with significant populations
- Ark-La-Tex, Central Texas, East Texas, Galveston, Greater Austin, Greater Houston, Beaumont–Port Arthur metropolitan area, Dallas–Fort Worth metropolitan area, Greater San Antonio, North Texas, Northeast Texas, Southeast Texas

Languages
- Texan English, Texan Spanish, Southern American English, Louisiana Creole, African-American Vernacular English, African languages

Religion
- Black Protestant, Roman Catholicism, Hoodoo (spirituality), Louisiana Voodoo

African American Texans or Black Texans are residents of the state of Texas who are of African ancestry and people that have origins as African-American slaves. African Americans formed a unique ethnic identity in Texas while facing the problems of societal and institutional discrimination as well as colorism for many years. The first person of African heritage to arrive in Texas was Estevanico, who came to Texas in 1528. Estevanico was originally from the city, Azamor. He voyaged along with three other Spaniards across Texas and Mexico, gaining popularity for being the first African to journey through Texas.

The earliest black residents in Texas were Afro-Spanish slaves brought by the Spanish.

A large majority of Black Texans live in the Dallas-Fort Worth, Tyler, Beaumont-Port Arthur, Galveston, Killeen, Houston and San Antonio metropolitan areas.

The 2020 U.S. Census identified the Black population alone, non-Hispanic population at 3,444,712, making Texas' Black population the largest of all states and territories in the United States.

== History ==
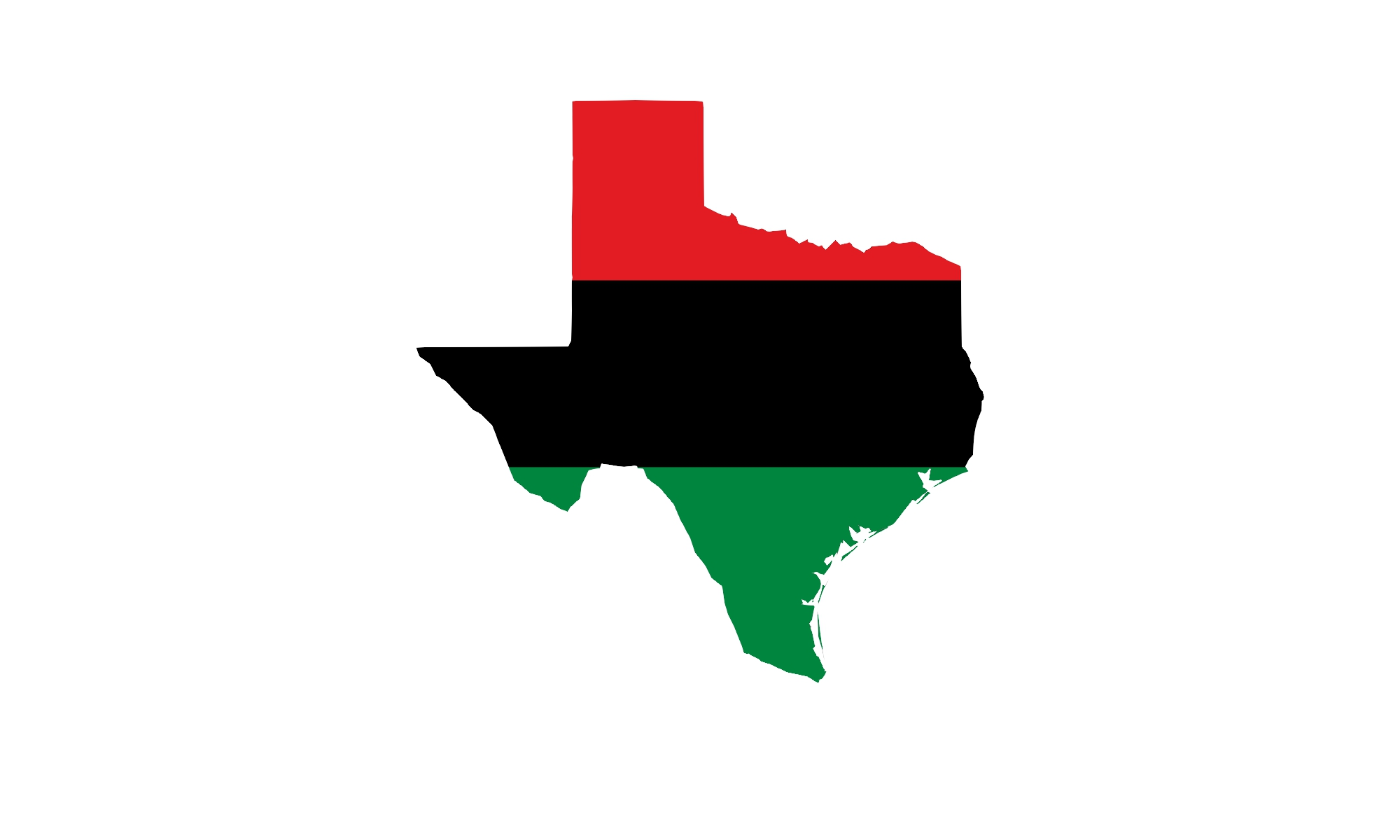
The Texas Black Liberation Flag

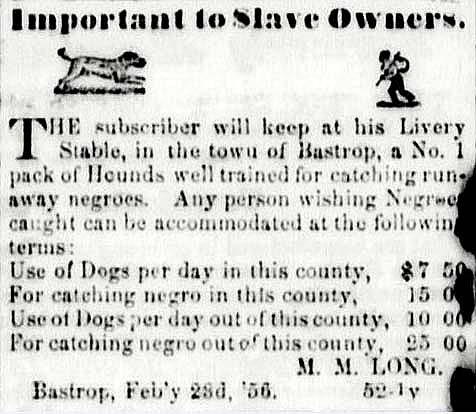
Slave hunting dogs advertisement in Texas

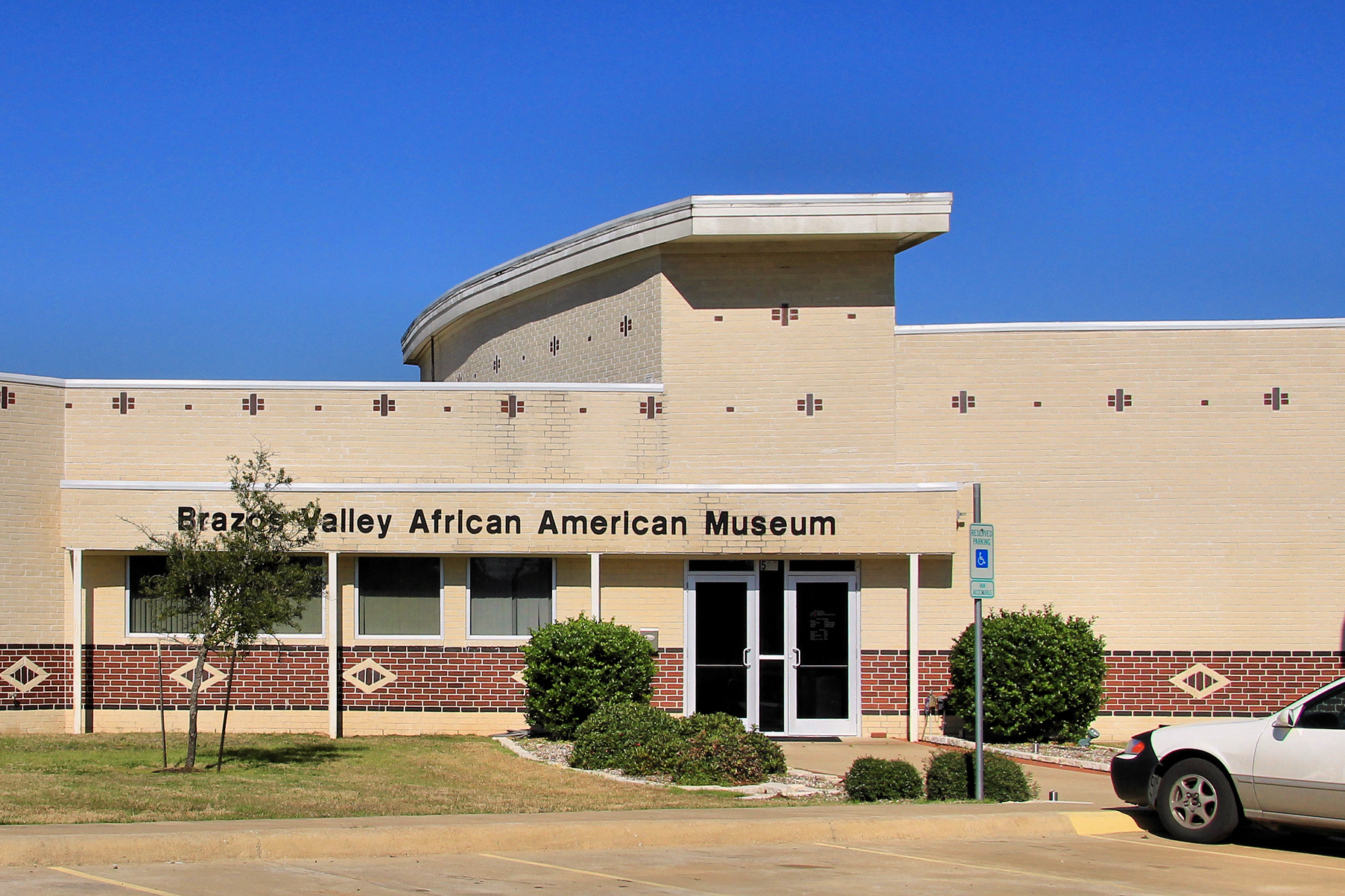
An African American museum located in Bryan, Texas

In 1529, a Moroccan man named Estevanico became the first African to come to what would later become Texas. He was sold into slavery to a Spanish explorer. Arriving in the New World, Estevanico and the rest of his party (including Cabeza de Vaca) were shipwrecked near Galveston Island, captured by a group of Coahuiltecan Native Americans, escaped, and trekked across what is now Texas and northern Mexico. In 1539 he accompanied the Spanish on a second expedition into the Southwest, seeking Cibolo or the “Seven Cities of Gold.” This time he was killed by the Zuñi Indians and the expedition failed.

The first Africans that lived in Texas were brought by Spanish when Texas was still a part of Spain. Enslaved Africans arrived in 1528 in Spanish Texas. In 1792, there were 34 blacks and 414 mulattos in Spanish Texas. Anglo white immigration into Mexican Texas in the 1820s brought an increased numbers of enslaved people. The Ashworths, a free African-American rancher family, began migrating to Spanish Texas in the 1830s.

Most slaves in Texas were brought by white families from the south. Some enslaved blacks came through the domestic slave trade, which was centered in the city of New Orleans. Most enslaved blacks in Texas were forced into unskilled labor as field hands in the production of cotton, corn, and sugar. Some other enslaved blacks lived and worked on large plantations and in urban areas where they engaged in more skilled forms of labor such as cooks, blacksmiths, and carpenters. The estimated 135,000 enslaved Africans forcefully taken throughout the New Orleans Slave trade developed a powerful economic gain for New Orleans; tying the city to slaves, cotton, and sugar.

Their proportion of the population has declined since the early 20th century after many left the state in the Great Migration. Blacks of both Hispanic and non-Hispanic origin made up 11.5 percent of the population in 2015; blacks of non-Hispanic origin formed 11.3 percent of the populace. African Americans of both Hispanic and non-Hispanic origin numbered roughly 2.7 million individuals, increasing in 2018 to 3,908,287. The majority of the Black and African American population of Texas lives in the Greater Houston, Dallas and San Antonio metropolitan areas.

Before the arrival of African American slaves, Native American tribes in Texas were initially enslaved by the Spanish in the Texas region but they died of European diseases. Anglo-Americans then began importing black slaves in Texas because they deemed black people inferior.

== Population ==
There was scarce Union Army activity in Texas, preventing them from joining the Northern Army. Some escaped over the borders to areas where the Union Army was operating. The announcement of emancipation was delayed until June 19, 1865, when officials announced that slavery had been formally abolished. It was celebrated first in Texas as Juneteenth. Juneteenth was celebrated in many African American Communities throughout the United States, it was not until 156 years later in 2021, it became a Federally Nationally recognized Holiday. African Americans left Texas by the tens of thousands during the Great Migration in the first half of the 20th century, seeking work and political opportunities elsewhere. As of the 2020 U.S. Census, African Americans were 11.8% of the state's population which mirrors the national average of 12.1%. The long-term effects of slavery can be seen to be present in the state's demographics. The eastern quarter of the state, where cotton production depended on thousands of slaves, is the westernmost extension of the Deep South and contains a very significant number of Texas' African-American population.

Texas has the largest African-American population in the country: as of 2020, 3,444,712, which is 11.8% of the state's total population. African Americans are concentrated in eastern, east-central and northern Texas, as well as the Houston, Dallas-Fort Worth and San Antonio metropolitan areas.

African Americans form 24 percent of both the cities of Dallas and Houston, 19% of Fort Worth, 8.1 percent of Austin, and 7.5 percent of San Antonio. The African American population in Texas is increasing due to the New Great Migration.

A 2014 University of Texas at Austin study observed that the state's capital city of Austin was the only U.S. city with a high growth rate that was nevertheless losing African Americans, due to suburbanization and gentrification.

In 2018, African-Americans had the second highest net growth in population in Texas compared to 2010. Harris County accounted for the largest percentage of that growth. Harris County's largest city Houston is now known as a center of African-American political power, education, economic prosperity, and culture, often called the next black mecca.

There is a black Louisiana Creole community in Texas.

There is also a Black Seminole presence in the state.

== Historically black colleges and universities in Texas ==
There are nine historically black colleges and universities (HBCUs) in Texas. Texas Southern University (largest) and Prairie View A&M University (second largest) are the two most notable HBCUs in Texas and annually produce a significant portion of college degreed African-American in the state. The schools are also major SWAC sports rivals. St. Philip's College is a public community college located in San Antonio, accredited by the Southern Association of Colleges and Schools. It is the westernmost HBCU in the United States.

== Notable Black Texans ==
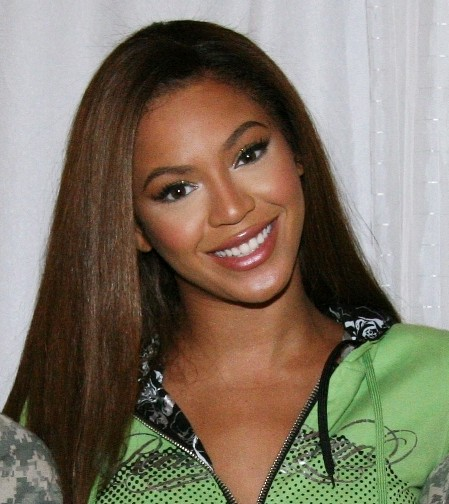
Beyoncé

The following are notable African American figures from Texas who have achieved prominence in music, acting, and entertainment.

- Barbara Jordan, politician
- Bessie Coleman, aviator
- Doris Miller, war hero
- Beyoncé, singer-songwriter and actress
- Ciara, dancer and singer-songwriter
- Debbie Allen, actress and dancer
- Forest Whitaker, actor and filmmaker
- Ivy Taylor, politician
- Jamie Foxx, actor and comedian
- Lecrae, rapper and singer
- Travis Scott, rapper and singer-songwriter
- Lizzo, singer and rapper
- Megan Thee Stallion, rapper and songwriter
- Mel Waiters, singer
- Mickey Leland, politician
- Juanita Craft, politician
- Etta Barnett, actress
- J. Mason Brewer, folklorist
- Rube Foster, baseball
- Yella Beezy, rapper
- Phylicia Rashad, actress
- Chamillionaire, rapper

== Racial laws regarding African Americans ==
The Reconstruction era government by Republicans, 1865 to 1874, worked to help the freed slaves despite fierce resistance from Democrats. A group of Republicans, including Charles Summer Thaddeus Stevens, advocated for African Americans to have protected equal rights. This paved their ultimate goal to better the Republic. The minority of Republicans managed to have Congress pass the Civil Rights Act in 1866 which prohibited unfair treatment to African Americans. The Reconstruction era resulted in a better society that accepted African Americans- especially in the South- and the Fifteenth Amendment sealed this movement.

1865: Juneteenth [Constitution] The people of Texas are informed that, in accordance with a proclamation from the Executive of the United States, all slaves are free. This involves an absolute equality of personal rights and rights of property between former masters and slaves, and the connection heretofore existing between them becomes that between employer and hired labor. The freedmen are advised to remain quietly at their present homes and work for wages. They are informed that they will not be allowed to collect at military posts and that they will not be supported in idleness either there or elsewhere. During the Reconstruction era before 1875, laws were passed to benefit he freed slaves.

1866: Education [Constitution] All taxes paid by African Americans go to maintaining African schools. Duty of the legislature to "encourage colored schools."

1866: Railroads [Statute] All railroad companies shall attach one passenger car for the special accommodation of freedmen.

1871: Barred segregation on public carriers [Statute] Public carriers prohibited from making any distinctions in the carrying of passengers. Penalty: Misdemeanor punishable by a fine from $100 to $500, or imprisonment from 30 to 90 days, or both.

1874: Jim Crow practices were begun informally after the overthrow of Republican control in 1874. However, by the 1890–1910 era they were often codified and enforced by statewide laws with criminal penalties.

1879: Miscegenation [Statute] Confirmed intermarriage law passed in 1858. Penalty applied equally to both parties.

1889: Railroads [Statute] Railroad companies required to maintain separate coaches for white and colored passengers, equal in comfort. Penalty: Passengers refusing to sit where assigned were guilty of a misdemeanor, and could be fined between $5 and $20.

1891: Railroads [Statute] Separate coach laws strengthened. Separate coaches for white and Negro passengers to be equal in all points of comfort and convenience. Designed by signage posted in a conspicuous place in each compartment. Trains allowed to carry chair cars or sleeping cars for the exclusive use of either race. Law did not apply to streetcars. Penalty: Conductors who failed to enforce law faced misdemeanor charge punish able by a fine from $5 to $25. The railroad company could be fined from $100 to $1,000 for each trip. Passengers who refused to sit in designated areas faced fines from $5 to $25.

1902: Poll tax [Amendment to state constitution] Required electors to pay poll tax. People who did not vote did not have to pay the tax, so many poor people stayed home.

1907: Streetcars [Statute] Required all streetcars to comply with the separate coach law passed in 1889. Penalty: Streetcar companies could be fined from $100 to $1,000 for failing to enact law. A passenger wrongfully riding in an improper coach was guilty of a misdemeanor, and faced fines from $5 to $25.

1909: Railroads [Statute] Depot buildings required to provide separate waiting areas for the use of white and Negro passengers.

1914: Railroads [Statute] Negro porters shall not sleep in sleeping car berths nor use bedding intended for white passengers.

1915: Miscegenation [State Code] The penalty for intermarriage is imprisonment in the penitentiary from two to five years.

1919: Public accommodations [Statute] Ordered that Negroes were to use separate branches of county free libraries.

1922: Voting Rights [Statute] "...in no event shall a Negro be eligible to participate in a Democratic party primary election held in the State of Texas. " Overturned in 1927 by U.S. Supreme Court in Nixon v. Herndon.

1925: Education [Statute] Required racially segregated schools.

1925: Public accommodations [Statute] Separate branches for Negroes to be administered by a Negro custodian in all county libraries.

1925: Miscegenation [Penal Code] Miscegenation declared a felony. Nullified interracial marriages if parties went to another jurisdiction where such marriages were legal.

1926: Public carriers [Statute] Public carriers to be segregated.

1935: Health Care [Statute] Established a state tuberculosis sanitarium for blacks.

1935: Public carriers [State Code] Directed that separate coaches for whites and blacks on all common carriers.

1943: Public carriers [State Code] Ordered separate seating on all buses.

1949: Employment [Statute] Coal mines required to have separate washrooms.

1950: Public accommodations [Statute] Separate facilities required for white and black citizens in state parks.

1951: Voting rights [Constitution] Required electors to pay poll tax.

1951: Miscegenation [Statute] Unlawful for person of Caucasian blood to marry person of African blood. Penalty: Two to five years' imprisonment.

1952: Health Care [Statute] Establishment of Tubercular ward hospitals for African Americans which allowed Blacks to receive care despite segregation.

1953: Public carriers [Penal Code] Public carriers to be segregated.

1956: Public accommodations [Municipal Ordinance] Abolished previously required segregation in the city of San Antonio's swimming pools and other recreational facilities.

1958: Education [Statute] No child compelled to attend schools that are racially mixed. No desegregation unless approved by election. Governor may close schools where troops used on federal authority.

1960: Miscegenation [State Code] Strictly Prohibited marriage or living together as man and wife between racially mixed persons. Penalty: One to ten years imprisonment in county jail, or fine

== See also ==
- History of African Americans in Austin
- History of African Americans in Houston
- History of African Americans in Dallas–Fort Worth
- History of African Americans in San Antonio
- History of Nigerian Americans in Dallas–Fort Worth
- History of Nigerian Americans in San Antonio
- Sweatt v. Painter
- Ivy Taylor
- Barbara Jordan
- Joe Lockridge
- Black cowboys
- Black Southerners
- History of slavery in Texas
- Demographics of Texas
- History of education in Texas
- East End Historic District (Galveston, Texas)
- History of Mexican Americans in Texas
- List of African-American historic places in Texas
- List of African-American newspapers in Texas
