= Ruth Evon Benson-Idahosa =

Nigerian-American activist

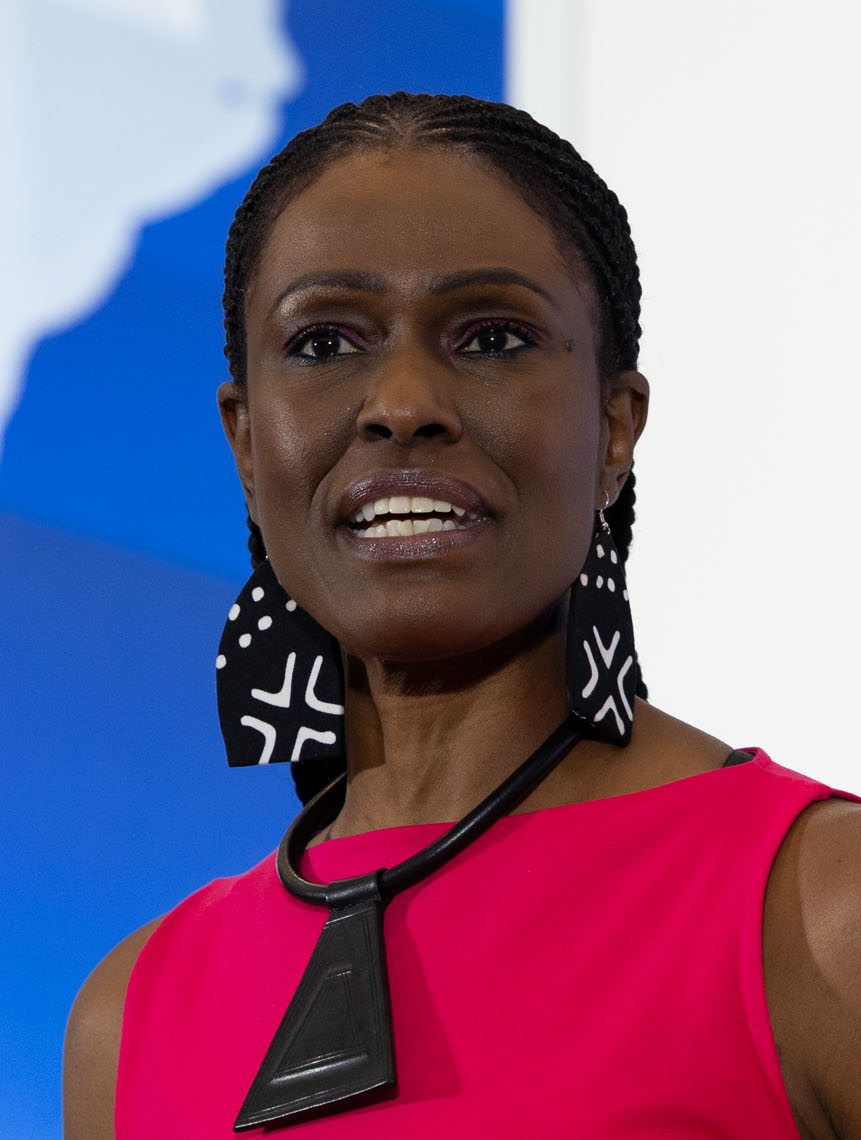
2023 Trafficking in Persons (TIP) Report Hero Ruth Evon Benson-Idahosa speaks during the release of the 2023 TIP Report at the U.S. Department of State in Washington, D.C.on June 15, 2023

Ruth Evon Benson-Idahosa is a Nigerian-American activist on human trafficking. Antony Blinken presented her with the United States Department of State's 2023 Anti-Human Trafficking Special Award. She is the founder of Pathfinders Justice Initiative (PJI), a non-profit organizations that partners with law enforcement and government bodies to combat sex trafficking, support the rehabilitation of survivors and advocate for legal reforms to address the causes of human trafficking. Ruth also launched the www.HERSAfrica.com, an online hub of resources for trafficking survivors.

Benson-Idahosa holds a law degree and is admitted to the bar in the United States and the United Kingdom.
