= Oluwatosin Olaseinde =

Nigerian-American entrepreneur

Oluwatosin Olaseinde is a Nigerian entrepreneur and founder of Money Africa, a financial literacy and investment platform which she founded in Lagos. In 2023, she won the $100,000 NSIA Prize For Innovation.
