= St. Mary's Church of the Assumption (Praha, Texas) =

Historic church in Texas, United States

- U.S. National Register of Historic Places
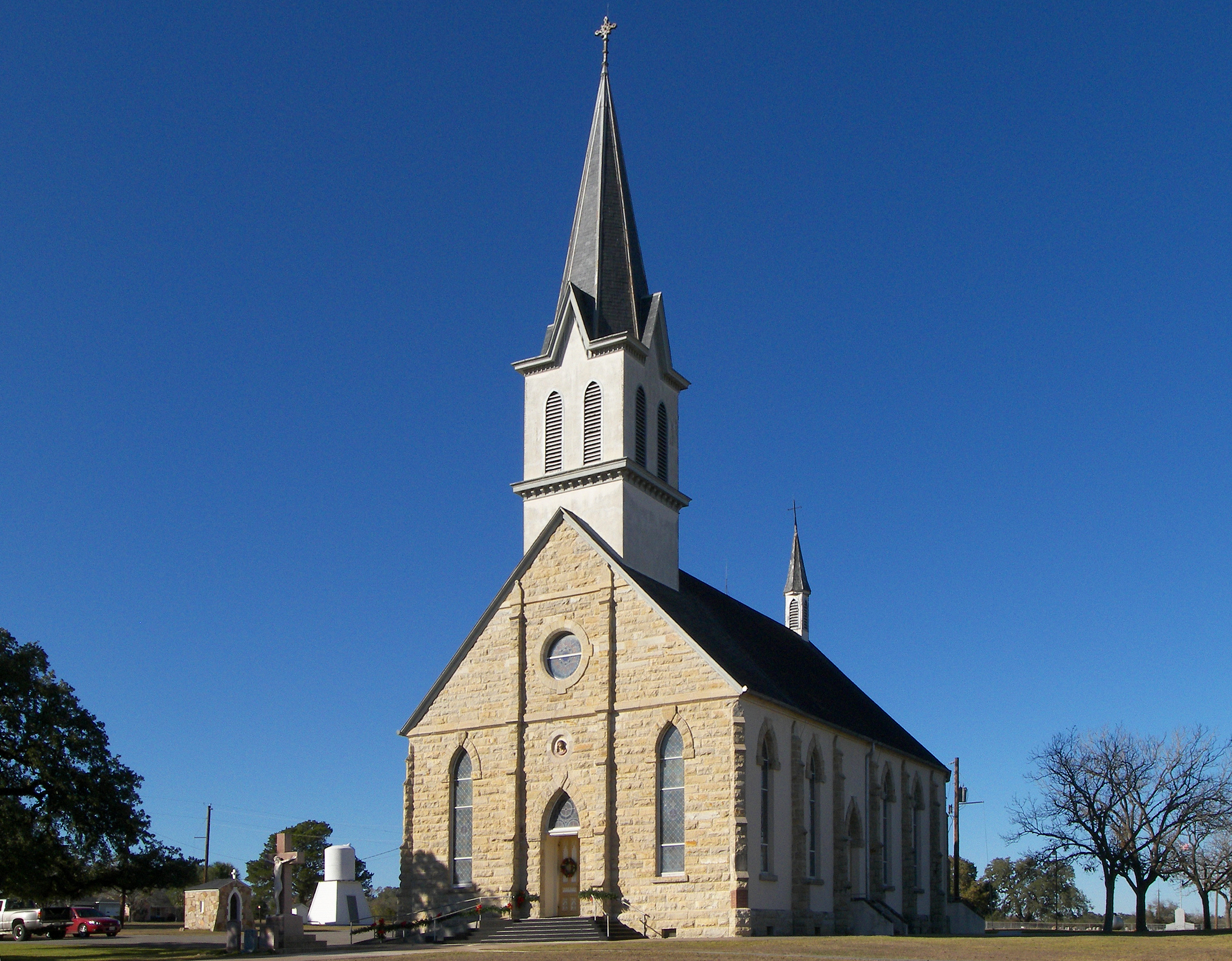
- St. Mary's Church in 2008

- Location within Texas Location within the United States
- Location: FM 1295, Praha, Texas
- Coordinates: 29°40′11″N 97°4′0″W
- Area: less than one acre
- Built: 1895
- Architect: O. Kramer
- Architectural style: Gothic Revival
- MPS: Churches with Decorative Interior Painting TR
- NRHP reference No.: 83003138
- Added to NRHP: June 21, 1983

St. Mary's Church of the Assumption is a historic church on FM 1295 in Praha, Texas.

It was built in 1895 and added to the National Register of Historic Places in 1983. Gottfried Flury, a Swiss-born artist from Moulton, TX, painted much of the interior. Using a combination of stenciling, infill painting, and freehand techniques, Flury's trompe-l'œil designs mimic stone vaults and Gothic tracery reminiscent of central European models. The ornate polychrome interior of St. Mary's Church of the Assumption is typical of the so-called "Painted Churches of Texas" constructed by immigrants who settled in the region in the nineteenth century.

== Plan ==
The church has a rectangular plan consisting of a five-bay nave with side aisles terminated by a polygonal apse.

== Gallery ==
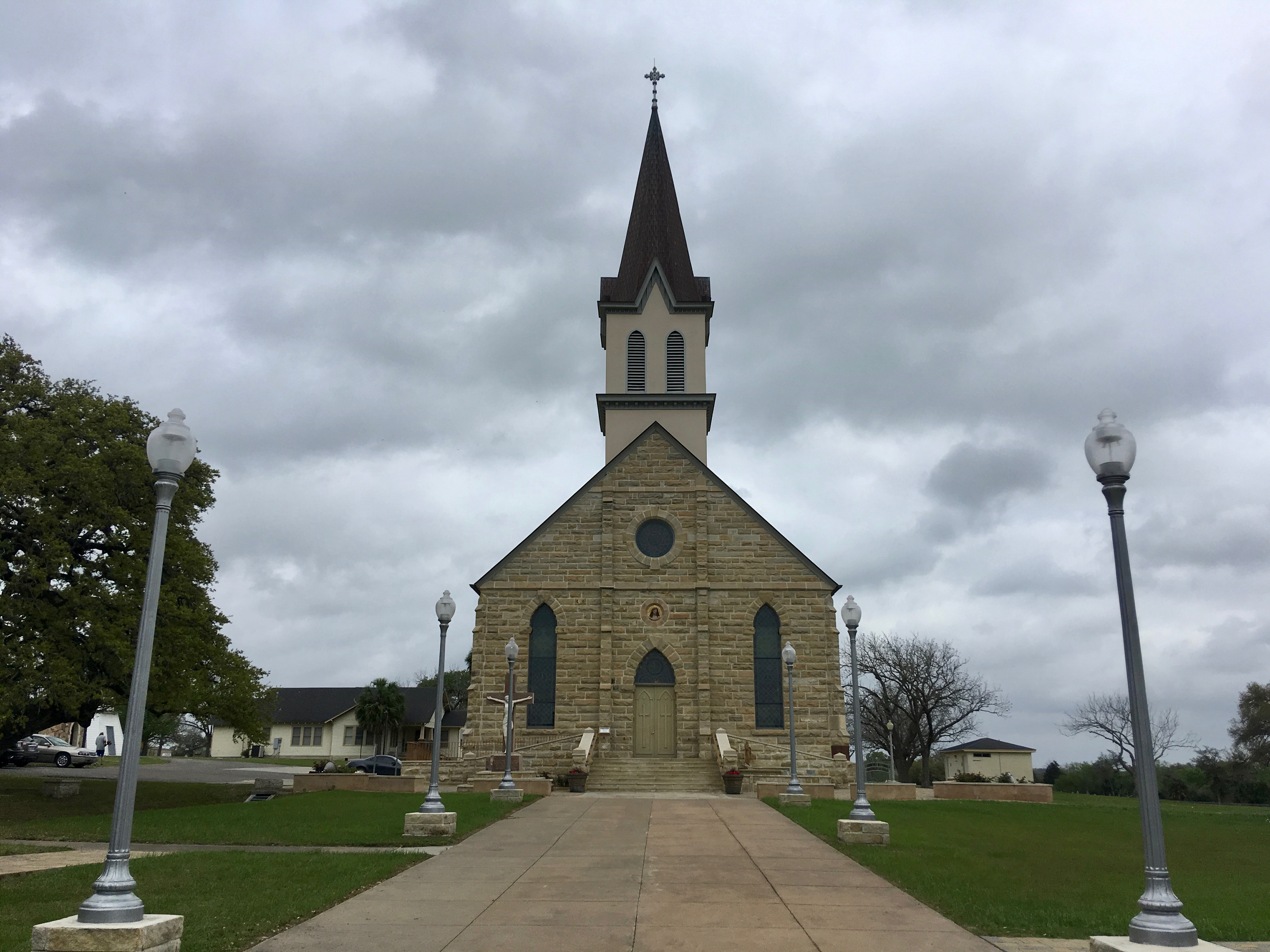
South façade

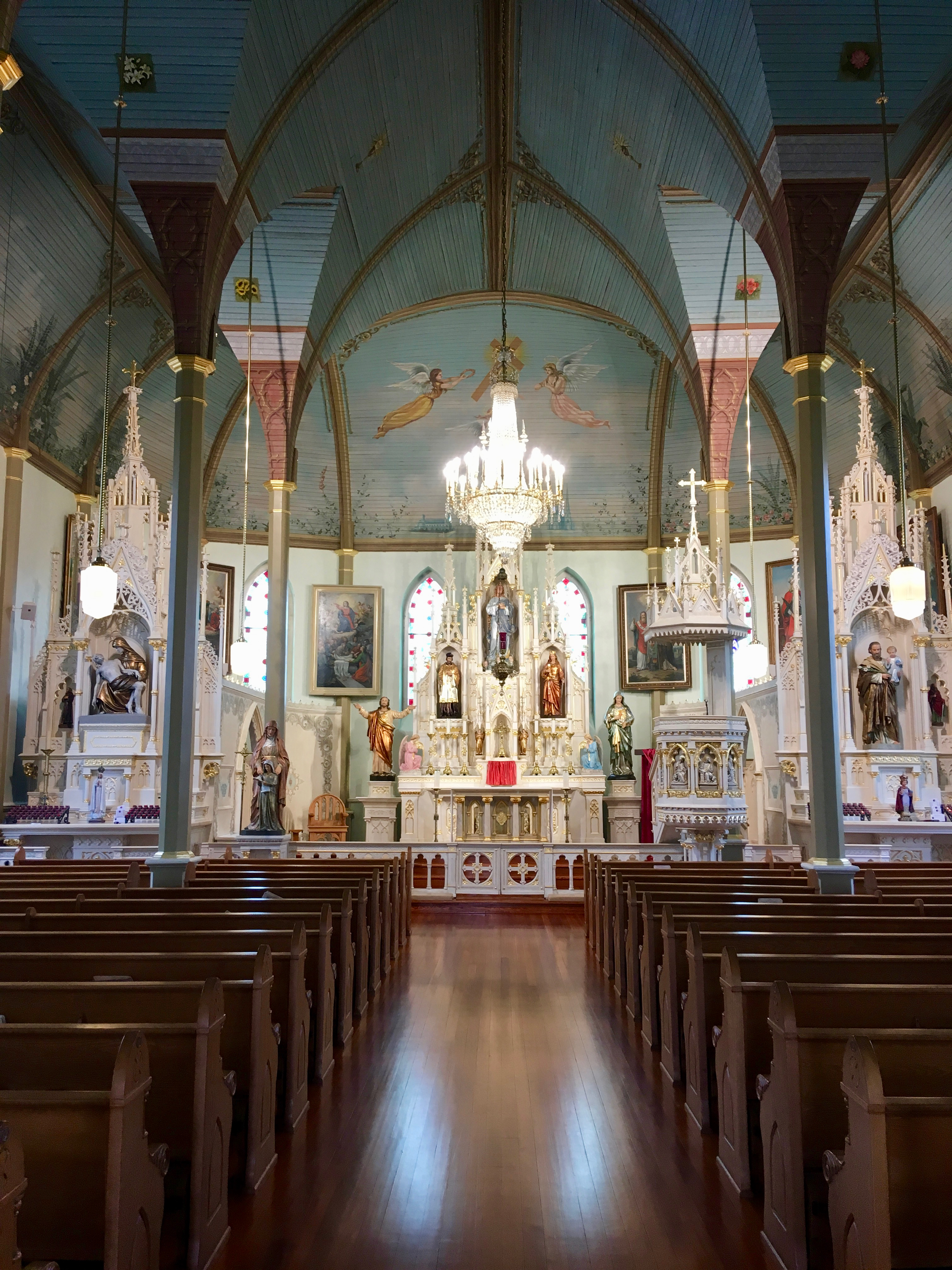
Interior view looking toward apse

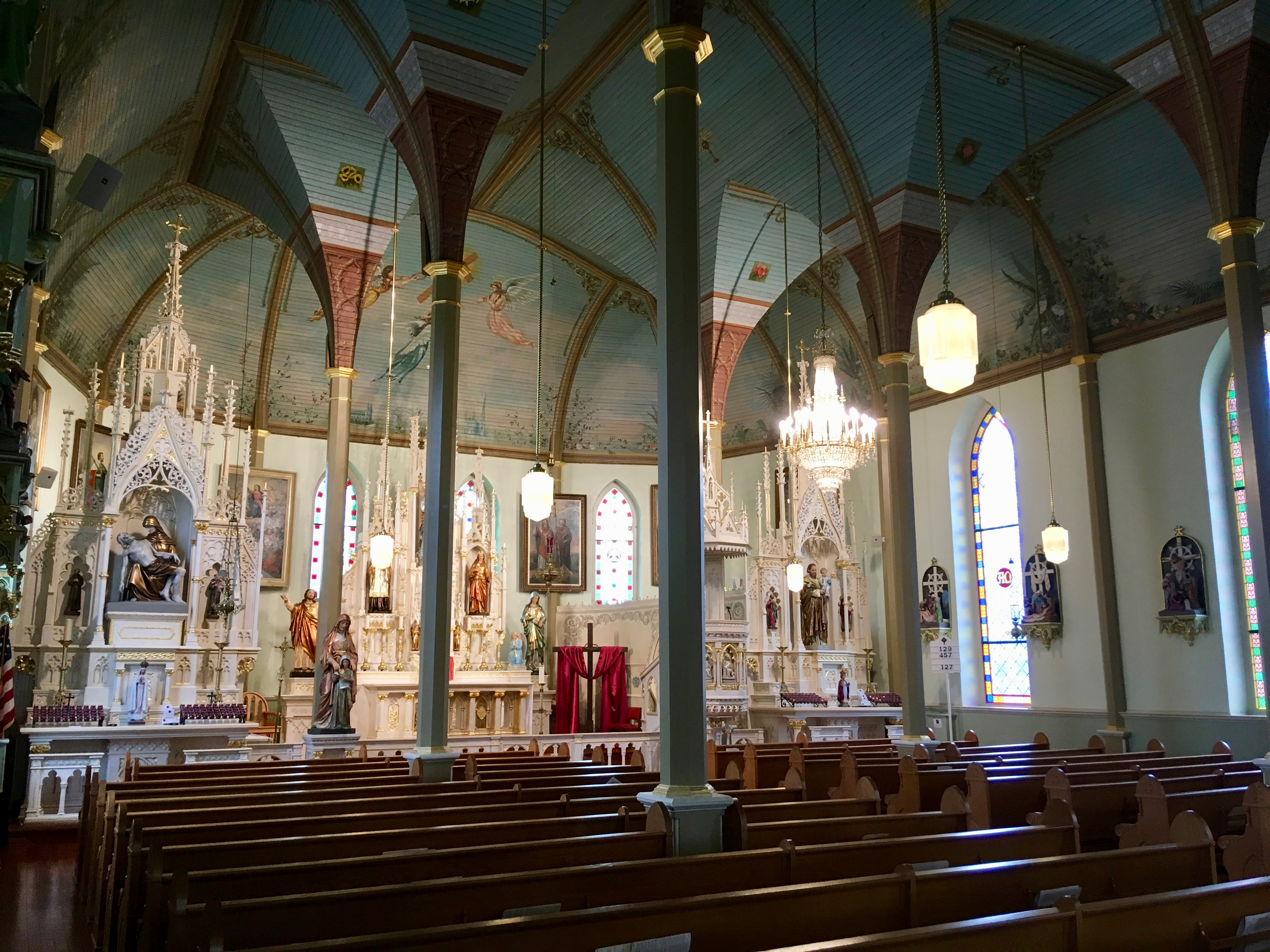
Interior

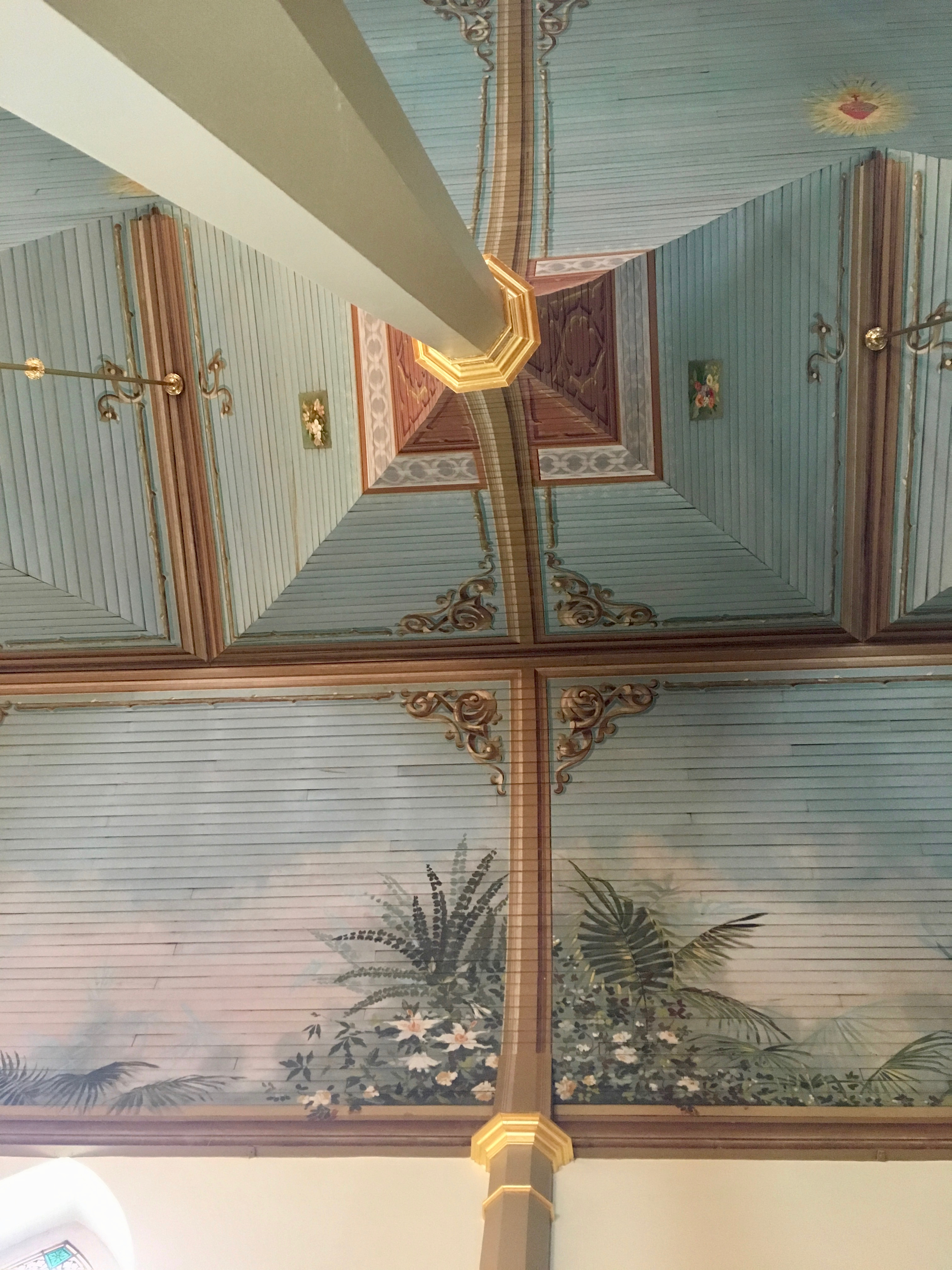
Interior painting, detail

== See also ==
- National Register of Historic Places listings in Fayette County, Texas
