= Nigerian Americans =

Americans of Nigerian birth or descent

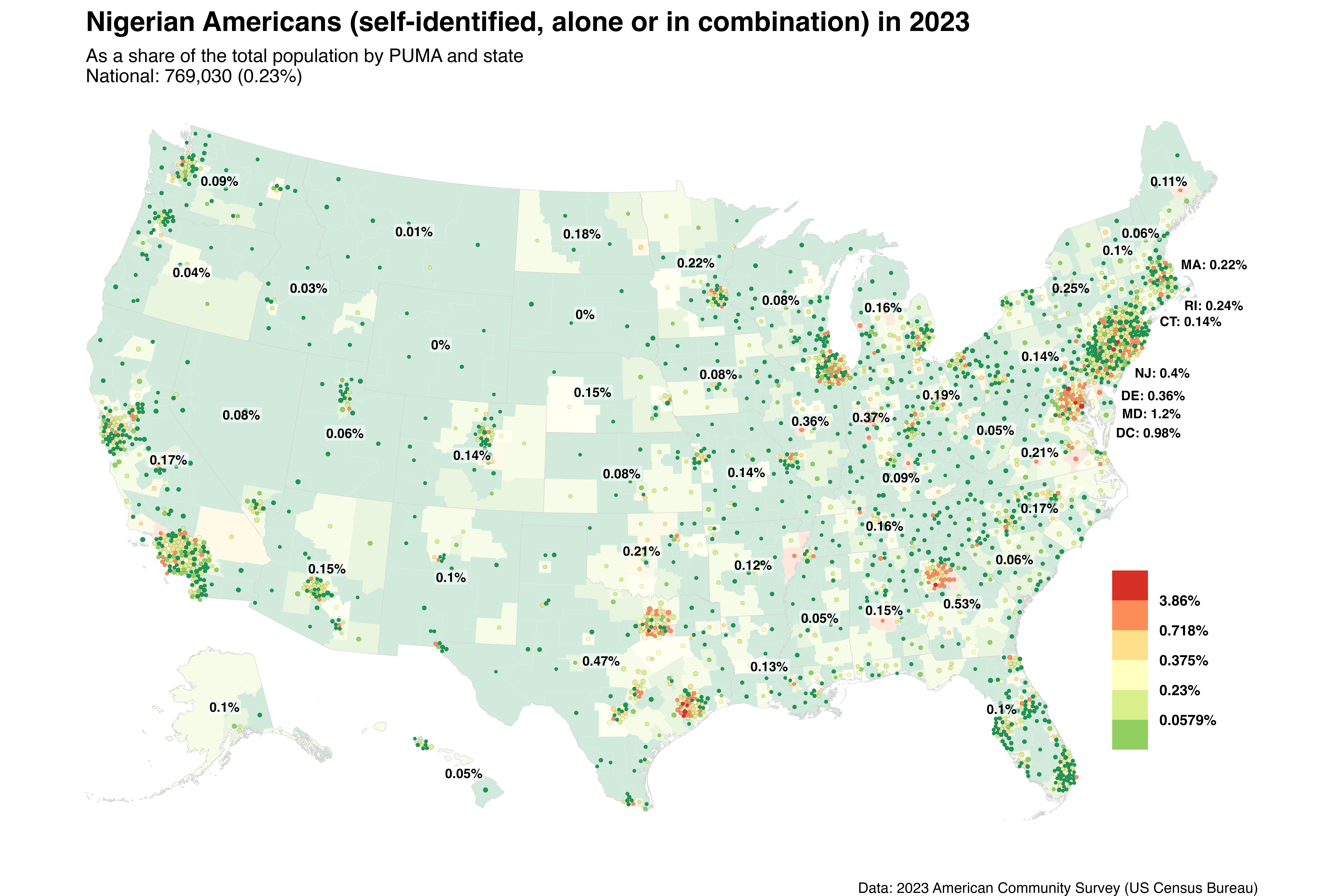

Total population
- 858,236 (2024) (ancestry or ethnic origin); 532,602 (2024) (born in Nigeria)

Regions with significant populations
- Northeastern US (especially NYC, Boston, Philadelphia, Rhode Island and New Jersey); Chicago; Milwaukee; Delaware; Maryland; Virginia; Washington, D.C.; North Carolina; Georgia (Atlanta); Florida (Miami, Tampa and Orlando); Kentucky; Twin Cities; Iowa; Texas (especially Houston, Dallas–Fort Worth and San Antonio); Southwestern US (Albuquerque and Phoenix); Seattle; Denver; California (Los Angeles, Bay Area)

Languages
- Predominantly English (American, Nigerian), Pidgin, Igbo, and Yoruba (and other Southern Nigerian languages such as Nupe and Ibibio); Others Edo, Ibibio-Anaang-Efik, Esan, Urhobo, Isoko, Idoma, Ijaw, Kanuri, Fulfulde, Hausa, Kalabari, Igala, Ikwerre, Tiv, Ebira, Nembe, Etsako, Itsekiri, and other languages of Nigeria

Religion
- Predominantly Christianity (Protestantism, Catholicism); Others Animism, Islam (Sunni, Shia), Juju, Nigerian Chrislam, Odinani, Yoruba religion, agnosticism, and atheism

Related ethnic groups
- Nigerian Canadians, British Nigerians, Nigerian Australians, African Americans, Igbo Americans, Yoruba Americans, Ibibio Americans

Nigerian Americans (Igbo: Ṇ́dị́ Naìjíríyà n'Emerịkà; Hausa: Yan Amurka asalin Najeriya; Yoruba: Àwọn ọmọ Nàìjíríà Amẹ́ríkà; Ibibio: Mbon Naiyiria k'Àmérìkà) are Americans who are of Nigerian ancestry. The number of Nigerian immigrants residing in the United States is rapidly growing, expanding from a small 1980 population of 25,000. The 2024 American Community Survey (ACS) estimated that 858,236 residents of the US were of Nigerian ancestry. The 2012–2016 ACS placed the Nigerian-born population at 277,000. Similar to its status as the most populous country in Africa, Nigeria is also the African country with the most migrants to the US, as of 2013. In a study which was carried out by consumer genetics company 23andMe which involved the DNA of 50,281 people of African descent in the United States, Latin America, and Western Europe, it was revealed that Nigeria was the most common country of origin for testers from the United States, the French Caribbean, and the British Caribbean.

Most Nigerian Americans, like British Nigerians, predominantly originate from southern Nigeria, as opposed to the Islamic northern half of the country.

== History ==
=== Atlantic slave trade (17th century – 1808) ===
The first people of ancestry from what is now modern Nigeria to arrive in what is now the modern United States were brought by force as slaves. These enslaved people were not called Nigerians but were known by their ethnic nations due to Nigeria not being a country until the early 1900s, after the slave trade was over. Calabar and Badagry (Gberefu Island), Nigeria, became major points of export of enslaved people from Africa to the Americas during the 17th and 18th centuries. Most slave ships frequenting this port were English.

==== Nigerian ancestry in enslaved people ====
Most of the slaves of Bight of Biafra – many of whom hailed from the Igbo hinterland – were trafficked to Virginia. After 400 years in the United States and the lack of documentation because of enslavement, African Americans have often been unable to track their ancestors to specific ethnic groups or regions of Africa. Like Americans of other origins, at this point most African Americans have ancestors of a variety of ethnic backgrounds. Most of the people who were stolen from Nigeria were likely to have been Igbo or Yoruba.

==== Enslaved people of Nigerian lineage ====
Ernest Shaw writes that the Demery/Dimery family has Nigerian origins. He says the genealogist Daryl Eley, with Ancestry.com, traced the family to Oya 'Jack' Demaree, who was born in Nigeria on the year 1645.

==== Pathways of specific ethnic groups ====
Other ethnic groups such as the Fula and Edo peoples were also captured and transported to the colonies in the New World. The Igbo were exported mainly to Maryland and Virginia. They comprised the majority of all enslaved Africans in Virginia during the 18th century: of the 37,000 Africans trafficked to Virginia from Calabar during the eighteenth century, 30,000 were Igbo. In the next century, people of Igbo descent were taken with settlers who moved to Kentucky. According to some historians, the Igbo also comprised most of the slaves in Maryland. This group was characterized by high rates of rebellion and suicide, as the people resisted and fought back against enslavement. Many Nigerians of Igbo origin were also brought into the US in the late 1960s as war refugees during Nigerian Civil War.

Some Nigerian ethnic groups, such as the Yoruba, and some northern Nigerian ethnic groups, had traditional, cultural identification marks, such as tattoo and scarification designs. These could have assisted a kidnapped and enslaved person who escaped in locating other members of their ethnic group, but few enslaved people managed to escape the colonies. In the colonies, slavers tried to dissuade the practice of traditional tribal customs. They also mixed people of different ethnic groups to make it more difficult for them to communicate and band together in rebellion.

==== Outlawing of slavery ====
US President Thomas Jefferson officially outlawed the Atlantic slave trade in 1808, although some enslaved Africans continued to be illegally smuggled into the country and the institution of slavery persisted until the American Civil War.

=== Modern migration (1960s–present) ===
In modern times, most Americans of unambiguous Nigerian ancestry are voluntary immigrants and their descendants. Various leaders of the Nigerian independence movement such as Eyo Ita, Mbonu Ojike, and Nnamdi Azikiwe were educated in the United States during the 1930s-1940s. When President Lyndon B. Johnson signed the Immigration and Nationality Act of 1965, US restrictions on immigration from regions outside of Northwestern Europe were eliminated, allowing for a greater number of Nigerians in the United States.

The modern generation of Nigerian migrants was initially motivated by the desire to pursue educational opportunities in undergraduate and postgraduate institutions in the United States. During the 1960s and the 1970s aftermath of the Nigerian Civil War, the Nigerian government funded the education of Nigerian students attending US universities. While this was occurring, there were several military coups, interspersed with brief periods of civilian rule. The instability resulted in many Nigerian professionals emigrating, especially doctors, lawyers and academics, who found it difficult to return to Nigeria.

During the 1980s, a larger wave of Nigerians immigrated to the United States. This migration was driven by political and economic problems exacerbated by the military regimes of self-styled generals Ibrahim Babangida and Sani Abacha. Other émigrés comprised a large number of refugees, fleeing on account of religious persecutions, endless political unrests and ethnic/tribal conflicts, the presumption of Nigeria as a failing state, or just to enhance the quality of lives for themselves and their families (Ogbuagu, 2013). The most noticeable exodus occurred among professional and middle class Nigerians who, along with their children, took advantage of education and employment opportunities in the US.

This exodus contributed to a "brain-drain" of Nigeria's intellectual resources to the detriment of its future. Since the advent of multi-party democracy in March 1999, the former Nigerian head-of-state Olusegun Obasanjo has made numerous appeals, especially to young Nigerian professionals in the United States, to return to Nigeria to help in its rebuilding effort. Obasanjo's efforts have met with mixed results, as some potential migrants consider Nigeria's socioeconomic situation still unstable (Ogbuagu, 2013b).

Since 1980, the estimated population of foreign-born Nigerians has grown from 25,000 to 392,811 in 2019.

== Socioeconomics ==
=== Education ===
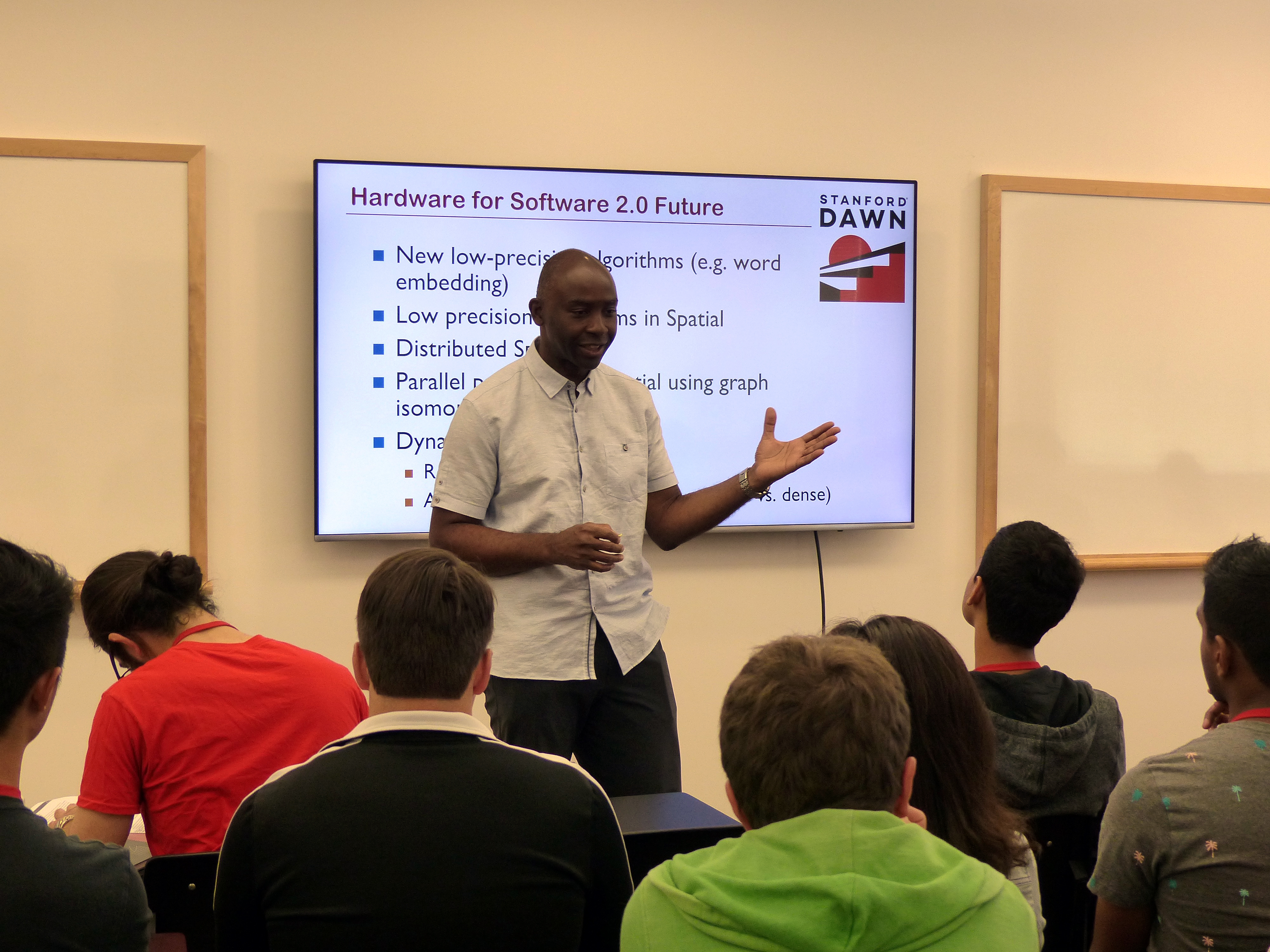
Oyekunle Olukotun, Professor of Electrical Engineering and Computer Science at Stanford University, known as the "father of the multi-core processor"

The Migration Policy Institute reports that 29% of Nigerian Americans have a master's degree, PhD, or an advanced professional degree (compared to 11% of the US population overall). Nigerian Americans are also known for their contributions to medicine, science, technology, arts, and literature. In 2023, 64.4% of Nigerian Americans had attained a bachelor's degree compared to 36.2% for the total population.

Nigerian culture has long emphasized education, placing value on pursuing academic excellence as a means to financial security. Examples of Nigerian Americans in education include Akintunde Akinwande, Oyekunle Olukotun, Jacob Olupona, and Dehlia Umunna, professors at the Massachusetts Institute of Technology, Stanford University, and Harvard University, respectively. Recent famous examples include ImeIme Umana, the first black woman to be elected president of the Harvard Law Review, Ngozi Okonjo-Iweala, the first woman to become the head of the World Trade Organization (WTO), and Tanitoluwa Adewumi, a homeless child refugee who went on to become a chess prodigy. Examples of Nigerian Americans in popular media include Dr. Bennet Omalu, portrayed in the 2015 film Concussion, and Emmanuel Acho, former professional football player and host of the weekly activist webcast Uncomfortable Conversations with a Black Man.

A large percentage of black students at highly selective top universities are immigrants or children of immigrants. Harvard University, for example, has estimated that more than one-third of its black student body consists of recent immigrants or their children, or were of mixed-race parentage. Other top universities, including Yale, Columbia, Duke, and Berkeley, report a similar pattern. As a result, there is a question as to whether affirmative action programs adequately reach their original targets: African Americans who are descendants of American slaves and their discriminatory history in the US.

According to the 2021 Open Doors report, the top five US institutions with the largest student population of Nigerian descent (in no particular order) are Texas Southern University, University of Houston, University of Texas at Arlington, University of North Texas, and Houston Community College. According to Institute of International Education's 2017 Open Doors report, 11,710 international students from Nigeria studied in the US during the 2016–2017 academic year, the 12th highest country of origin and highest of any African country.

=== Economics ===
56.9% of Nigerian Americans work in Management, business, science, and arts occupations compared to 43.2% for the total population. Nigerian Americans in 2023 had a median household income of $80,711 which was higher than the total population's. However, Nigerian Americans had a slightly lower per capita income ($43,030) than the total population ($43,313). Personal earnings for Nigerian American males was $67,475 and $61,208 for females, both of which were higher than the total population's which was $63,975 for males and $52,437 for females. Nigerian Americans had a slightly lower poverty rate than the total population. Nigerian American families also had a lower poverty rate than the total population. Nigerian Americans have a high labor force participation rate of 77.7%.

=== Relations with other African Americans ===
In 2017, sociologist Onoso Imoagene argued that second generation Nigerian Americans are forming a distinct "diasporic Nigerian ethnicity" rather than assimilating into the mainstream African American culture, in contrast to what should have been predicted by segmented assimilation theory. Limited sociological research suggests that Nigerian Americans may have a more positive opinion of the American police compared to the broader black community. The Marshall Project and Prison Legal News have reported that the Texas Department of Criminal Justice heavily recruits Nigerians to serve as guards in Texas prisons, where a significant proportion of the prisoners are black.

== Demography and areas of concentrated residence ==
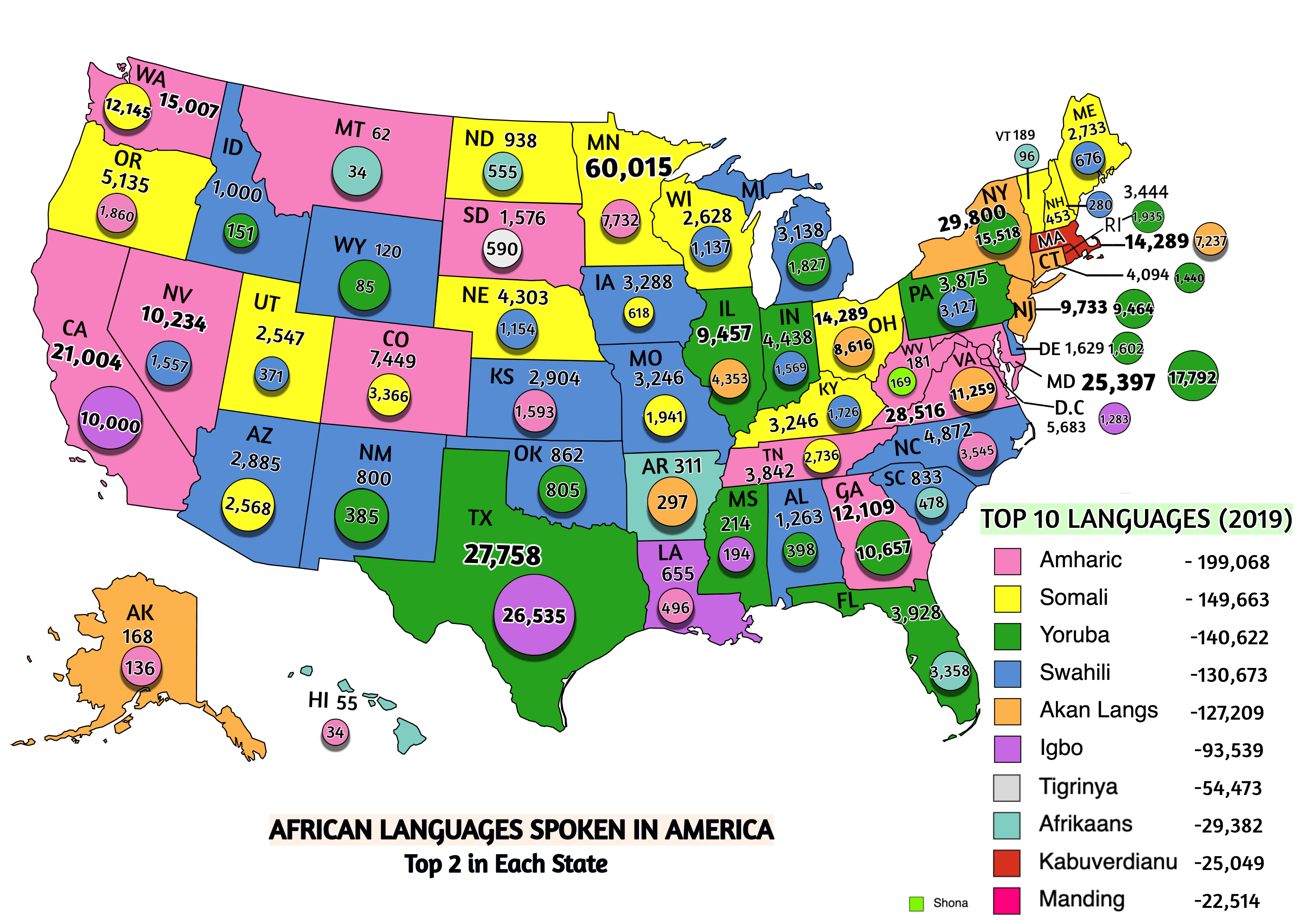
African Languages Spoken in American Households

As of 2013, the World Bank estimated that 252,172 Nigerian migrants live in the US. This is 23% of all Nigerian migrants, the most of any destination country. Nigerian migrants represent 0.5% of all migrants in the US, the 32nd highest of all US source countries.

=== US states with the largest Nigerian populations ===
The 2016 American Community Survey estimates that 380,785 US residents report Nigerian ancestry.

The 2012-2016 ACS estimates that 277,027 American residents were born in Nigeria. It also estimates that these states have the highest Nigerian-born population:

1. Texas 60,173
2. Maryland 31,263
3. New York 29,619
4. California 23,302
5. Georgia 19,182
6. Illinois 15,389
7. New Jersey 14,780
8. Florida 8,274
9. Massachusetts 6,661
10. Pennsylvania 6,371
11. North Carolina 3,561

== Religious demographics ==
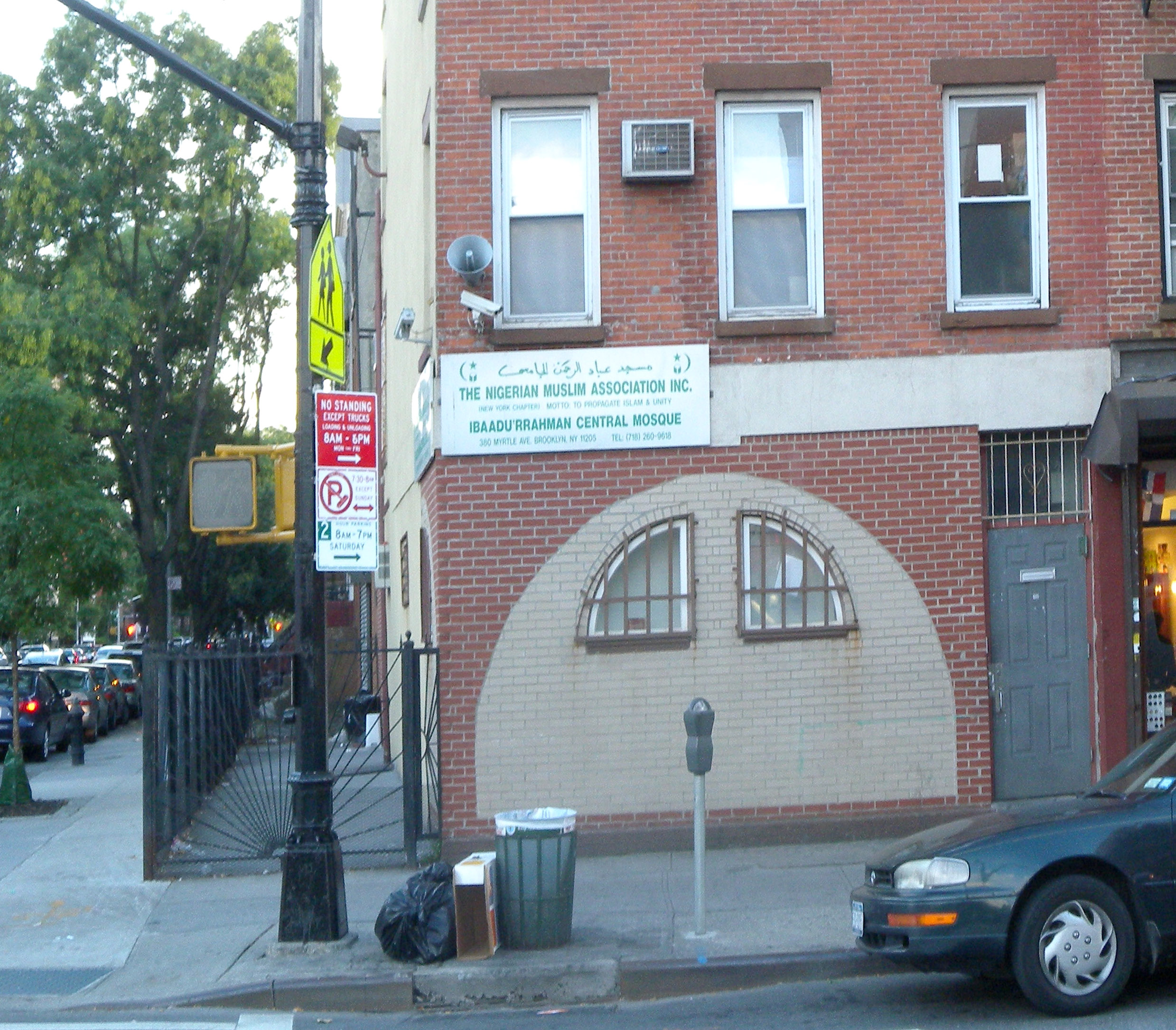
Nigerian Muslim association in Fort Greene, Brooklyn, New York

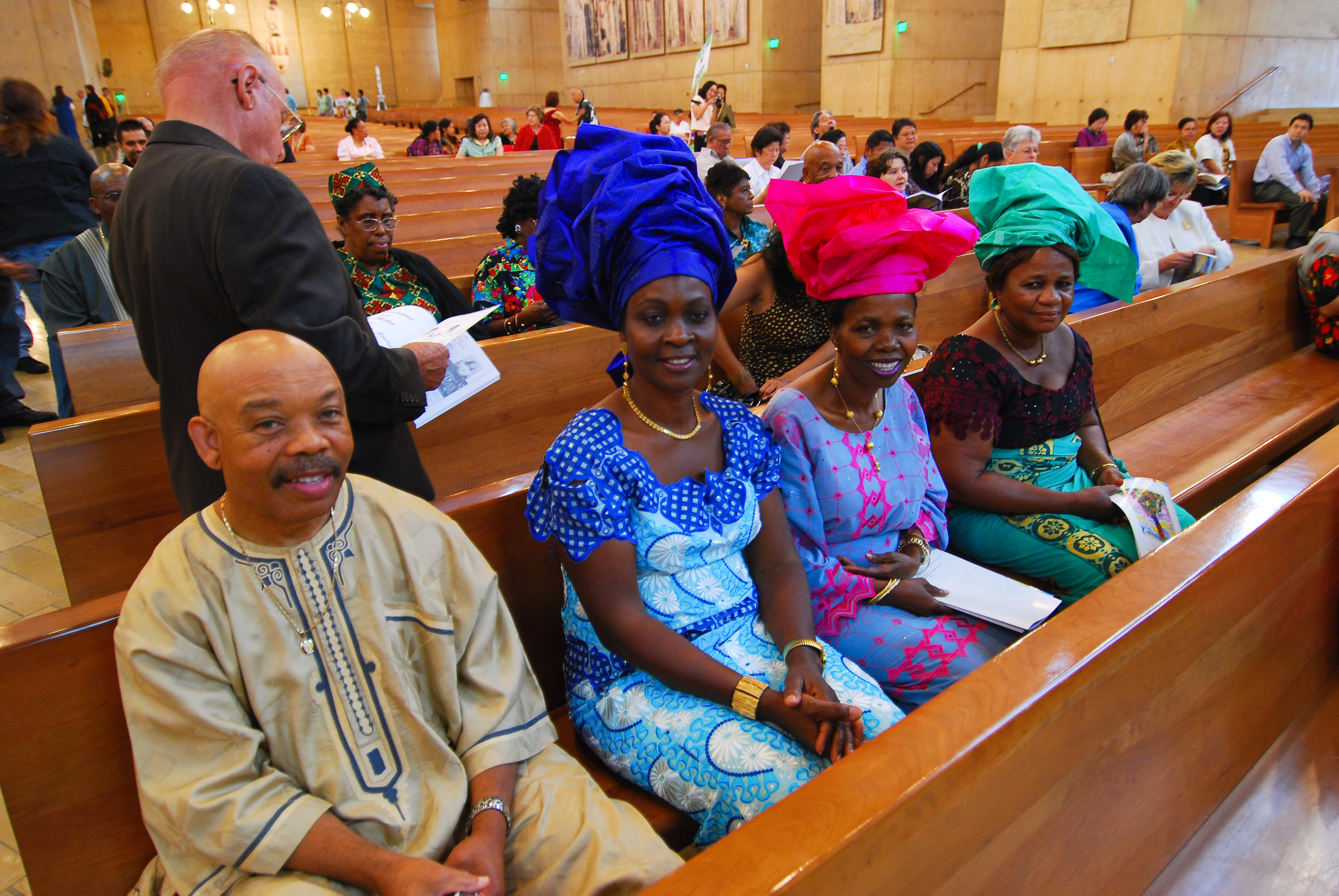
Igbo Catholics in the Cathedral of Our Lady of the Angels, Los Angeles, California

In terms of religion, the Nigerian community in the United States is split, as approximately 70% practice Christianity while 28% follow Islam and the remainder practice other religions (2%).

== Traditional attire ==
Among Nigerian Americans, traditional Nigerian attire remains very popular. However, because the fabric is often hard to acquire outside of Nigeria, traditional attire is not worn on an everyday basis but rather, reserved for special occasions such as weddings, Independence Day celebrations, birthday ceremonies and Muslim Eid celebrations. For weddings, the fabric used to sew the outfit of the bride and groom is usually directly imported from Nigeria or bought from local Nigerian traders and then taken to a local tailor who then sews it into the preferred style. Due to the large number of Nigerians living in America and the cultural enrichment that these communities provide to non-Nigerians, the traditional attire has been adopted in many parts of the country as a symbol of African ethnicity, for example, clothes worn during Kwanzaa celebrations are known to be very influenced by Nigerian traditional attire. In recent years, the traditional fabric has attracted many admirers especially among celebrities such as Solange Knowles and most notably Erykah Badu.

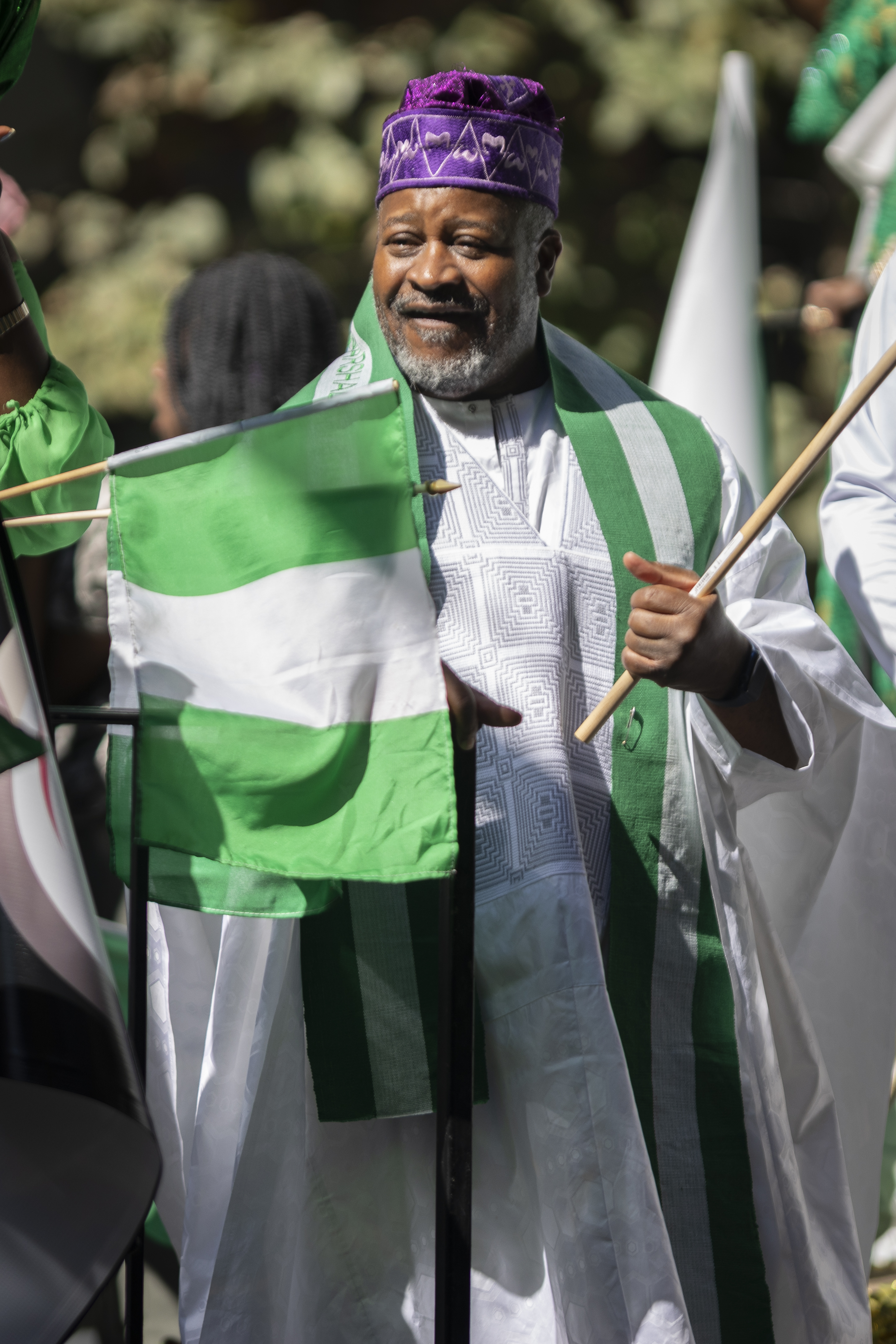
A man attends the Nigerian Independence Day Parade in New York City

In the fashion industry, Nigerian American designers like Boston-born Kiki Kimanu are able to combine the rich distinct colors of traditional attire with Western styles to make clothes that are sought after by young Nigerian professionals and Americans alike.

== Nigerian American ethnic groups ==
Nigerian Americans can be subdivided into Nigeria's three largest ethnic groups: the Igbo, Yoruba, and Hausa-Fulani.

=== Igbo American ===
Igbo Americans are people in the United States that maintain an identity of a varying level of Igbo ethnic group that now call the United States their chief place of residence (and may also have US citizenship). Many moved to the US following the effects of the Biafran War (1967–1970).

=== Yoruba American ===
Yoruba Americans are Americans of Yoruba descent. The Yoruba people (Yoruba: Àwọn ọmọ Yorùbá) are an ethnic group originating in southwestern Nigeria and southern Benin in West Africa. The first Yoruba people who arrived to the United States were imported as slaves from Nigeria and Benin during the Atlantic slave trade. This ethnicity of the slaves was one of the main origins of present-day Nigerians who arrived to the US, along with the Igbos. In addition, native slaves of current Benin hailed from peoples such as Nago (Yoruba subgroup, although exported mainly by Spanish, when Louisiana was Spanish), Ewe, Fon, and Gen. Many slaves imported to the modern United States from Benin were sold by the King of Dahomey, in Whydah.

The native tongue of the Yoruba people is spoken principally in Nigeria and Benin, with communities in other parts of Africa, Europe, and the Americas. A variety of the language, Lucumi, is the liturgical language of the Santería religion of the Caribbean.

=== Ibibio American ===
Ibibio Americans are Americans of Ibibio descent. The Ibibio people (Ibibio: Mbon Ibibio) originate mainly from present day Akwa Ibom State and some parts of Cross River State (this is mainly dominated by the Efik people) of Nigeria. Ibibio Americans are identified by their common names and Ibibio language of the Efik-Ibibio language cluster. This language cluster include the mutually intelligible Efik, Annang, and Ibibio dialects. The main seaport where slaves were moved out of Nigeria is located in Calabar, the capital city of Cross River State and the first British Administrative Headquarter in southern Nigeria.

=== Fulani American ===
Fulani Americans are people in the United States that maintain a cultural identity of various levels from the Fulani ethnic groups and now call the United States home. Most speak Hausa, Fulfulde as well as English fluently and Arabic on various levels. The first wave of Fulani immigrants arrived as a result of the Atlantic slave trade. Recent Fulani arrivals immigrated to the United States during the 1990s. They now make up a large percentage of the Muslim communities across America.

== Organizations ==
Nigerian American organizations in the US include:

- Houston, Texas–based Nigerian Union Diaspora (NUD)
- Society for Africans in the Diaspora (SAiD Institute)
- Houston, Texas–based Nigerian American Multicultural Council, NAMC (namchouston.org)
- San Antonio Nigerian Nurses Association
- Nigeria Peoples Association of San Antonio
- Washington, D.C.–based Nigerian-American Council or Nigerian-American Leadership Council
- The Alliance of Nigerian Organizations in Atlanta, Georgia
- The Nigerian Association Utah
- The Nigerian Ladies Association of Texas (NLAT)
- The Nigerian American Multi Service Association, NAMSA (namsa.org)
- First Nigeria Organisation
- United Nigeria Association of Tulsa
- The Alliance of Nigerian Organizations in Georgia is an organization that tries to satisfy the interests of the community, and represents all Nigeria nonprofit associations in the state (such as Nigerian Women Association of Georgia – NWAG-), in tribal issues, ethnic, educational, social, political and economic. Through the ANOG, the Office of Nigerian Consulate in Atlanta reaches the Nigerian community associations.
- National Council of Nigerian Muslim Organizations in USA;
- The National Council of Nigerian Muslim Organizations is an organization that teaches Islam, study the elements of religion, favoring Muslim integration in the US, creating a Muslim American identity and promoting interpersonal relationships.
- Nigerian Ladies Association of Texas (NLAT) is an apolitical, non-profit formed by Nigerian women that promote fellowship, community and family values. NLAT is looking for ways to improve the lives of its members and their families and contribute to improving the life and development of Nigeria and the United States of America. The association teaches its members on individual rights (especially the rights of women, creating media to promote respect for these rights, to promote equality and peace between the sexes) and establishes job opportunities for Nigerians living in Texas, organizes and provides resources to women and children in Nigeria and the US, teaches Nigerian culture to the new generations, working with women's groups in the US and drives programs to promote education and health services. and the Nigerian American Multi Service Association (NAMSA) provides services to community members.
- Nigerian Lawyers Association (NLA): Incorporated in 1999, the NLA's principal objectives are to cultivate the science of jurisprudence. Its first president was John Edozie of Madu, Edozie, and Madu law firm.
- NNAUSA is an organization for the Ngwa Diaspora in America

Nigerian American associations representing the interests of determined groups include:

- The Association of Nigerian Physicians in the Americas (ANPA)
- Igbo Studies Association Inc., USA
- Nigerian Nurses Association of USA, Inc.
- Ogbakor Ikwerre USA, Inc. is a non–profit organization of Ikwerre indigenes residing in the United States of America and Canada. We are committed to the survival and prosperity of the Ikwerre people and the entire Ikwerre community. OIUSA is an incorporate body that was founded on July 6, 1996 in Los Angeles, California. The organization is incorporated in the city of Atlanta, Georgia, but headquartered in Los Angeles. Membership comprises individuals and associations that subscribe to OIUSA vision. Members come from all over the 50 states in the US and Canada
- Nigerian Student Association
- Akwa Ibom State Association of Nigeria, USA, Inc. (AKISAN)

== See also ==
- Igbo Americans
- Yoruba Americans
- Africans in the United States
- African immigration to Latin America
- History of Nigerian Americans in Dallas–Fort Worth
- History of Nigerian Americans in San Antonio
- List of topics related to Black and African people
- Nigeria–United States relations
