= Akwa Ibom State Association of Nigeria, USA Inc. =

American non-profit organization

AKISAN USA
- AKISAN USA official logo, c. 2002
- Abbreviation: AKISAN
- Formation: 1967
- Type: Non-profit organization
- Legal status: 501(c)(3)
- Headquarters: Washington, D.C.
- Members: 1000+
- National President: Itoro Akpan-Iquot
- Website: www.akisan.org
- Remarks: 2026 AKISAN National Convention was held on August 6–9 in Dallas, TX

Current Atlanta, Georgia
- Key people: Mr. Itoro Akpan-Iquot (National President) Mrs. Uwem Inyang (Vice-President); Sir Michael Asuquo, KSJI (Secretary); Mrs. Elizabeth Ekpenyong (Treasurer); Mr. Assian Ekpoudom, P.E. (Public Relations); Dr. Idorenyin Okpok (Social Secretary) Mrs. Lelia Essien, Esq. (Legal Counsel)

Akwa Ibom State Association of Nigeria, USA Inc., otherwise known as AKISAN, is a 501(c)(3) non-profit organization based in the United States of America, which promotes the interests of the citizens of Akwa Ibom State of Nigeria both in the homeland and the diaspora.

== Objectives ==
Its goals are:

1. To promote, encourage and foster unity amongst the citizens of Akwa Ibom State of Nigeria.
2. To promote economic, educational, cultural, scientific and social progress of Akwa Ibom State within the framework of one Nigeria.
3. To cooperate with and support bona-fide Nigerian Associations in the United States of America and encourage members of the association to join Nigerian Associations and participate in promoting the interest of Nigeria both at the homeland and abroad.
4. To encourage and support the educational, professional and legitimate business aspirations of all Akwa Ibom State citizens, provided those aspirations are consistent with the best interest of Akwa Ibom State of Nigeria and its citizens.
5. To act as a liaison between the Akwa Ibom State government, and others, including other organizations both government and non-governmental, and the members of the association and citizens of Akwa Ibom State of Nigeria in the United States of America.
6. To support and promote various charitable organizations by cooperating with any such organization, participating in its activities or contributing to such an organization.

== History ==
The association was founded in 1967 during the Nigerian Civil War under the name, Association of Students of South Eastern State of Nigeria in the Americas. The purpose was to organize its people and fight for the cause of preserving their identity as a people in Nigeria after the creation of the state, long yearned for. This was no small contribution from students who were not only thousands of miles away from the war-torn homeland but were also self-supported.

=== Early name changes ===
When Cross River State was created in 1976, the association changed its name to The Association of Students of Cross River State of Nigeria in the Americas. With the creation of Akwa Ibom State 20 years later, the name changed to Association of Students and Citizens of Akwa Ibom State in the Americas. The inclusion of citizens in the name was to make it feasible – for those who have completed their studies and are no longer students, to continue their participation and contribution in the affairs of the association. The name was further changed in 1990 to its present name of Akwa Ibom State Association of Nigeria, USA Inc. The association is incorporated in Washington, D.C.

=== Founding chapters and activities ===
Since Akwa Ibomites reside in various cities of the United States, the association is organized in most major cities. The association started initially in New York City, and then in Washington, DC. During the late seventies, the activities of the colloquium included, among other events a soccer match competition between the perennial powers, New York City and Washington, D.C. This match is now played between the eastern and western select teams.

For purposes of coordination, control of activities, and sharing of information between these city organizations and the home country, it became necessary to organize a National Executive Committee consisting of the national president and a cabinet and the different city organizations assumed the status of "Chapters." The national president is the pre-eminent officer and with his/her cabinet is responsible for the day-to-day running of the association and the execution of its overall policies. The national president appoints all members of the National Executive Committee, and starting in 2004 is elected during the AKISAN National Convention to one term of two years. Some chapters appear in diaspora events such as fundraisers, community voluntary efforts, health awareness, and the Nigerian Independence parades.

== The National Council ==
The association has gone through some restructuring over the years consistent with the constitution. A landmark restructuring occurred in 1975 in Chicago, Illinois, during Dr. Edet Inwang's administration when the collection of chapter presidents were accorded the status of national vice president with or without portfolios (distinguished from the national executive vice president appointed by the national president). All the national vice presidents together with the national executive constitute the National Council, the policy-making body of the association.

=== Executive offices and committees ===
The reorganization introduced the involvement of all the chapters in the administrative processes of the organization. The executive administration has as its core responsibility, the duty to execute the policies of the association and report to the National Council and the National Convention. This structure introduces a professional internal administrative control and the involvement of chapters in all policy matters. Some National Vice Presidents are assigned portfolios such as Information, Culture, Education, Youth, Membership, Social Welfare, and Economic & Fiscal. Economic & Fiscal portfolio is usually reserved for the hosting chapter of the National Secretariat administrative term. Each chapter has its president, constitution, and by-laws, and must conform to its chapter's name to the National Constitution, which is supreme whenever there is a conflict.

=== The general counsel ===
Another major body of the association was the appointment of a general counsel during the 1988 colloquium, to advise and act on behalf of the association and its chapters in all legal matters. This position was elevated to a constitutional office during a constitutional amendment in the year 2000. The association’s first general counsel was Dr. Emmanuel D. Akpan, who was followed by Hope Umana, Esq., Michael Essien, Esq., David Essien, Esq., and Lelia Essien, Esq. the current legal counsel.

Current Board of Trustees
- Key people: Mr. Bobby Onofiok (Chairman) Dr. Umoh Ntekim (Vice Chairman); Lady Nkoyo Ekpo (Secretary); Mr. Emmanuel Akpan (Asst. Secretary); Mrs. Itawan Ita (Treasurer); Mr. Efiong Okon, Sr. (Asst. Treasurer); Dr. Ibanga Ikpe (Liaison Officer); Dr. Ini Ekpenyong (Asst. Liaison Officer); Mrs. Comfort Ekpenyong (Project Coordinator); Mr. Itoro Akpan-Iquot (Ex-Officio) Sir Michael Asuquo, KSJI (Ex-Officio)

=== The Board of Trustees ===
The 2000 constitutional amendment also introduced a nine-member Board of Trustees, elected at-large to sit for three years on a rotational basis. At least three trustees are elected each year during the National Convention. The trustees are the key advisers to the national president on financial matters and are responsible for the association's properties and monies. The board is also responsible for helping the association implement fund raising policies. The inaugural chairman of the board was late Dr. Nsidibe Ikpe. Dr. Peter E. Udo Umoh of Connecticut, as General Secretary of the board, functioned as Board manager and worked with Dr. Nsidibe Ikpe and the board members to facilitate a reengineering of the association structurally and financially to strengthen it and to align it with its core and traditional mission of gathering Akwa Ibom people in the United States under a collective umbrella of common brotherhood. In the first few years of the Board, the Leadership and its members worked in close collaboration with the National President and the National Council to reshape the association, engendering unity across the nation while injecting integrity into the modernization of the association.

== Achievements ==
The Hon. Monday R. Affiah's administration recorded major achievements for the association which include the commissioning of a borehole water project for the students and staff of the Government Trade Center, Ikot Akata. As part of the School of Excellence program; the donation of 3 soccer trophies to Akwa Ibom State government for soccer tournaments among all post-primary institutions in the state, the institution of the first youth challenge competition where the winner was crowned at the 2008 Convention, the restart of Mbuk Akwa Ibom newsletter publication and the commissioning of infrastructure design for the building of Akwa Ibom Learning Center in Uyo. A total of at least 250 people made the trip from Nigeria to the 2008 National Convention. The event recorded the largest number of attendees and the largest official delegation from Nigeria ever witnessed. The Akwa Ibom youth dance troupe led by the then Youth President Mr. Paul Frank performed at the U.S Capitol to a packed crowd of spectators.

Other achievements recorded by the association include the publication of its first magazine, then called "Searchlight", by the late Dr. Bassey Obotette, as editor and later changed to “Mbuk Akwa Ibom” with Okon W. Akpan as Director of Information. Other achievements are the establishment of the emergency trust fund, and the establishment of the project fund and obtaining tax-exempt status, the introduction of the beauty pageant, the shipping of dialysis machines to the state, the book project, project hope, sending various communiqués to federal and state governments, establishment of the strategic planning committee, appearance at the U.S. Cherry Blossom Festival and the American Folklife festival.
