= Praha, Texas =

Unincorporated community in Fayette County, Texas, United States

Praha
- Unincorporated community
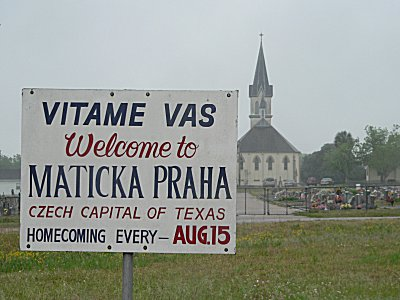
- Welcome sign of Praha, Texas

- Praha (Texas)
- Coordinates: 29°40′06″N 97°04′02″W
- Country: United States
- State: Texas
- County: Fayette County
- Elevation: 381 ft (116 m)

Population (1954)
  - Total: 21
- GNIS feature ID: 1344478

Praha is an unincorporated community located in Fayette County, Texas, United States. The community was sometimes called "Maticka Praha," which means in Czech "Mother Prague." The city is called the "Czech capital of Texas".

== History ==
The town was originally called Mulberry by the first Anglo settlers, James C. Duff, William Criswell and Leroy Criswell. (It was also known as Hottentot, a name which apparently referred to a band of local outlaws.)

In 1854 a recent Czech immigrant named Matyáš (Matěj) Novák purchased 100 acres (0.40 km^{2}) of land and built a house in which early Masses were celebrated. His arrival attracted other Czech immigrants, including Jan Baca, Josef Vyvjala, Ondřej Gallia, Josef Hájek, František Václ, and George Morýsek. In 1858 the town was renamed "Praha", the native name for the Czech capital Prague.

The small town slowly grew over the next decades. In 1865 Joseph Bithowski, a Bernardine father, built a small frame church, and at midnight on Christmas Day the first Mass was offered. In 1868, a public school was established, and by the 1880s Praha had three stores, a restaurant, and a new frame church, which served as the mother parish for surrounding towns. A post office started service in 1884, and in 1896 a Czech Catholic school was established.

Praha began a gradual decline after 1873, when the Southern Pacific Railroad laid tracks a mile north of town and Flatonia, a new town founded nearer the tracks, began to draw business away from Praha.

At its peak in the 1880s, Praha boasted 700 residents, but during the twentieth century the population of Praha never rose above 100, and in 1906 the post office closed. By 1968, the population had dropped to 25. In 1973, both the parochial and public schools closed.

However, worshipers from the area continue to attend Mass at the parish church, St. Mary's Church of the Assumption, currently the town's most notable feature. The Gothic Revival structure was completed in 1892 and is the center of the annual Feast of the Assumption homecoming festival, which has been celebrated in Praha each August 15 since 1855. Locally known as "Praha Picnic", the celebration draws as many as 5,000 visitors to its traditional Czech polka music and kolaches.

During the Second World War, Praha had the unfortunate distinction of being the U.S. town with the largest ratio of war deaths to residents. The largest number of deaths occurred in 1944, when nine soldiers from Praha were killed. Three small identical chapels were built in memory of the dead.
