= History of Nigerian Americans in San Antonio =

The Greater San Antonio area has one of the largest Nigerian American populations in the United States. San Antonio is home to a growing Nigerian community.

== History ==
A significant number of African immigrants call San Antonio home. Many Nigerians of Igbo origin began leaving Nigeria after the Biafra war of 1967–1970. By the 1980s, San Antonio began receiving many persons of Nigerian origin, forming the Nigerian community in San Antonio. Many Nigerians are currently moving to San Antonio due to affordable cost of living than other major Texas cities and job opportunities. Nigerians and other West Africans in San Antonio are concentrated around areas particularly in the South Texas Medical Center, Leon Valley, and the Northwest side. The Nigerian population in San Antonio, Texas, is estimated to be around 10,000 to 15,000 individuals. This number can vary over time due to migration trends and demographic changes.

== Demographics ==
As of 2000, within the counties of Bexar, Comal, and Medina, there were 7,100 persons who were born in Nigeria, making up about 1% of the total foreign-born population of these three counties. As of 2020 about 150,000 Nigerian Americans live in the San Antonio area.

== Economy ==
By 2018, several San Antonio area Nigerians became involved in the home health care business. In 2018, the home healthcare business has attracted Nigerians since it has tremendous income possibilities compared to many other types of jobs and it may allow them to own their own businesses. There are several Nigerian American owned businesses in San Antonio.

== Education ==
As of 2004 large numbers of Nigerian immigrants in the San Antonio area have post-secondary education, and almost all of them had received secondary education. Nigerian immigrants in San Antonio have higher education levels than other immigrant groups and U.S.-born whites.

== Organizations ==
San Antonio have several Nigerian organizations such as the San Antonio Nigerian Nurses Association, and the Nigeria Peoples Association of San Antonio. The Owerri and Igbo people have ethnic associations in San Antonio.

== See also ==
- Nigerian Americans
- History of Nigerian Americans in Dallas-Fort Worth
