= History of Nigerian Americans in Dallas–Fort Worth =

The Dallas–Fort Worth area has one of the largest Nigerian American populations in the United States.

== History ==
Many Nigerians of Igbo origin began leaving Nigeria after the Biafra war of 1967–1970. After that, Dallas began to receive many persons of Nigerian origin, and by the 1980s the Nigerian community in Dallas formed.

== Demographics ==
As of 2000, within the counties of Dallas, Denton, Collin, and Tarrant, there were 7,300 persons who were born in Nigeria, making up about 1% of the total foreign-born population of these four counties. As of 2005 most of the Nigerian immigrants come from southern Nigeria.

As of 2014 the numbers of Igbo Nigerian Americans in the Dallas–Fort Worth area were in the ten thousands. Several Nigerian community leaders in the DFW area stated that there were up to 50,000 Igbos in the region.

In 2005 Dennis D. Cordell and Manuel Garcia y Griego, authors of "The Integration of Nigerian and Mexican Immigrants in Dallas/Fort Worth, Texas," wrote that "virtually all Nigerians arriving in the DFW, even the most recent cohort in 2000-2004, came with high levels of spoken English." This is because most Nigerians coming to DFW historically came from the upper and middle classes and had used English extensively.

== Geography ==
As of 2000, of the recent Nigerian immigrant population in DFW, 61% live in Dallas County, and of the total number in Dallas County 49% live within the Dallas city limits.

The main area of Nigerian settlement in Dallas, also occupied by African-Americans, includes a market frequented by Nigerians, a Nigerian-centered restaurant, and many rental units. It is in proximity to U.S. Highway 75.

== Economy ==
By 2014 several DFW area Nigerians became involved in the home health care business. in 2014 Nigerian American attorney Godson Anyanwu stated that the home healthcare business attracted Nigerians since it has better income possibilities compared to many other types of jobs and it may allow them to own their own businesses. That year U.S. federal officials had entered several indictments against some of them, accusing them of engaging in fraud. U.S. attorney Sarah Saldaña stated that their Nigerian origins were "not material" and "carries no weight in any of the indictments I am aware of."

== Organizations ==
As of 2015 North Texas has over 50 organizations focused on Nigerian ethnic groups. The Igbo and Owerri people have ethnic associations in DFW.

== Education ==
As of 2007 large numbers of Nigerian immigrants in the DFW area have post-secondary education, and almost all of them had received secondary education.

== Media ==
The Africa Herald is published in Dallas. As of 2014 the publisher is Richard Nwachukwu. The African International is also published in DFW.

== Notable residents ==
- Ike Diogu (Garland)
- Ugo Ihemelu (Cedar Hill)

== See also ==
- Africans in Guangzhou
- Africans in Hong Kong
- History of Nigerian Americans in San Antonio
- Sub-Saharan African community of Paris
