= Illegal immigration to China =

Illegal immigration to China is the process of migrating into China in violation of Chinese immigration laws. The Chinese government has instituted policies against illegal immigration, particularly from North Korean refugees and defectors, workers and refugees from Vietnam, the Philippines, Myanmar, Laos and Africans in Guangzhou.

== Policies ==
The Chinese government actively discourages this type of behavior out of fears that it may cause instability in the region and encourage more illegal immigration.

In 2003, campaigns against illegal immigration were conducted in Guangdong and other Chinese provinces, and around 2008, the police repeatedly conducted so-called "hurricane" campaigns against illegal immigration in Guangdong.

=== Guangzhou ===
Since 2004 at the latest, illegal immigration has increasingly come into the focus of the police authorities in Guangzhou, primarily targeted against immigrants from African countries, and later throughout the country. In Guangzhou, a regulation has been in force since 2004 under which citizens are requested to report cases suspected of illegal immigration to the police, which can be rewarded with CN¥100 for information that leads to successful expulsions.

According to Reuters in 2009, there were as many as 100,000 Africans and Arabs in Guangzhou, mostly illegal overstayers.

In 2012, the legal framework on the exit-entry administration was amended and the new regulations featured extended power of the local police in immigration issues, higher sanctions against illegal stay and illegal employment as well as revised rules regarding deportation.

On May 20, 2025, rumors went viral on Chinese social media of over 3000 police officers conducting a raid on Sanyuanli Subdistrict, which has a huge African community. On May 27, 2025, the Sanyuanli Subdistrict government dismissed these claims as "false and baseless rumors".

=== North Korean border ===
Illegal immigrants from North Korea have moved across the China–North Korea border to seek higher wages and escape repression.

The Chinese government transferred responsibility for managing the border to the army from the police in 2003. Chinese authorities began building wire fences "on major defection routes along the Tumen River" in 2003. Beginning in September 2006, China erected a 20 kilometres (12 mi) fence on the border near Dandong to prevent defectors and refugees from crossing the border into China.

=== From Southeast Asia ===
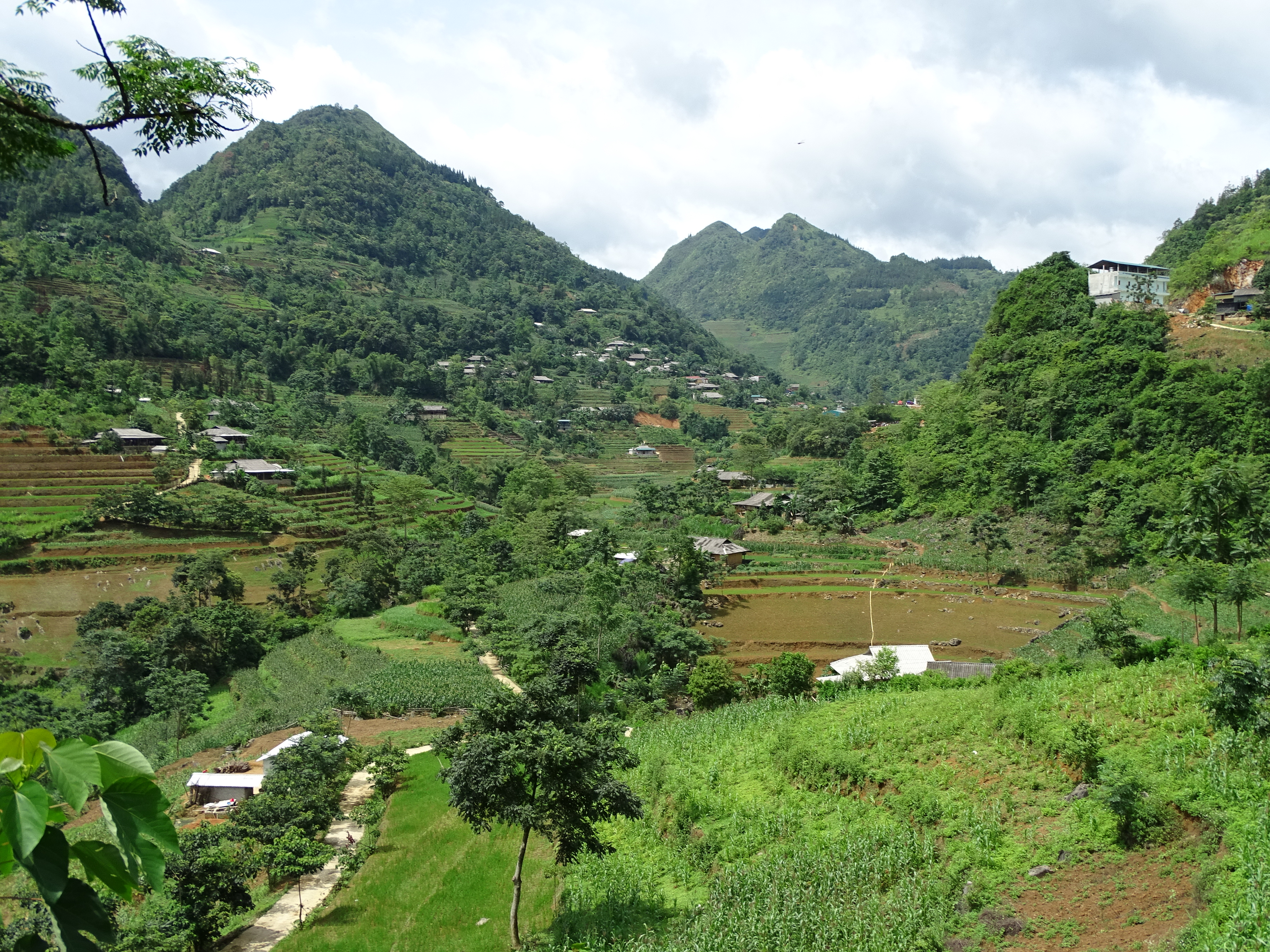
Countryside of Vietnam's impoverished Lao Cai Province, source of many illegal migrant workers to China

Significant numbers of Vietnamese, Cambodian and Burmese workers have been smuggled into China illegally to work low-skilled jobs for wages undercutting those of domestic workers and to fill vacancies left by Chinese migrant workers. Thousands of Vietnamese from the poorer northern provinces move to China to work illegally each year.

== See also ==
- National Immigration Administration
