= Chinese people in Nigeria =

- (China) (Taiwan) (Nigeria)
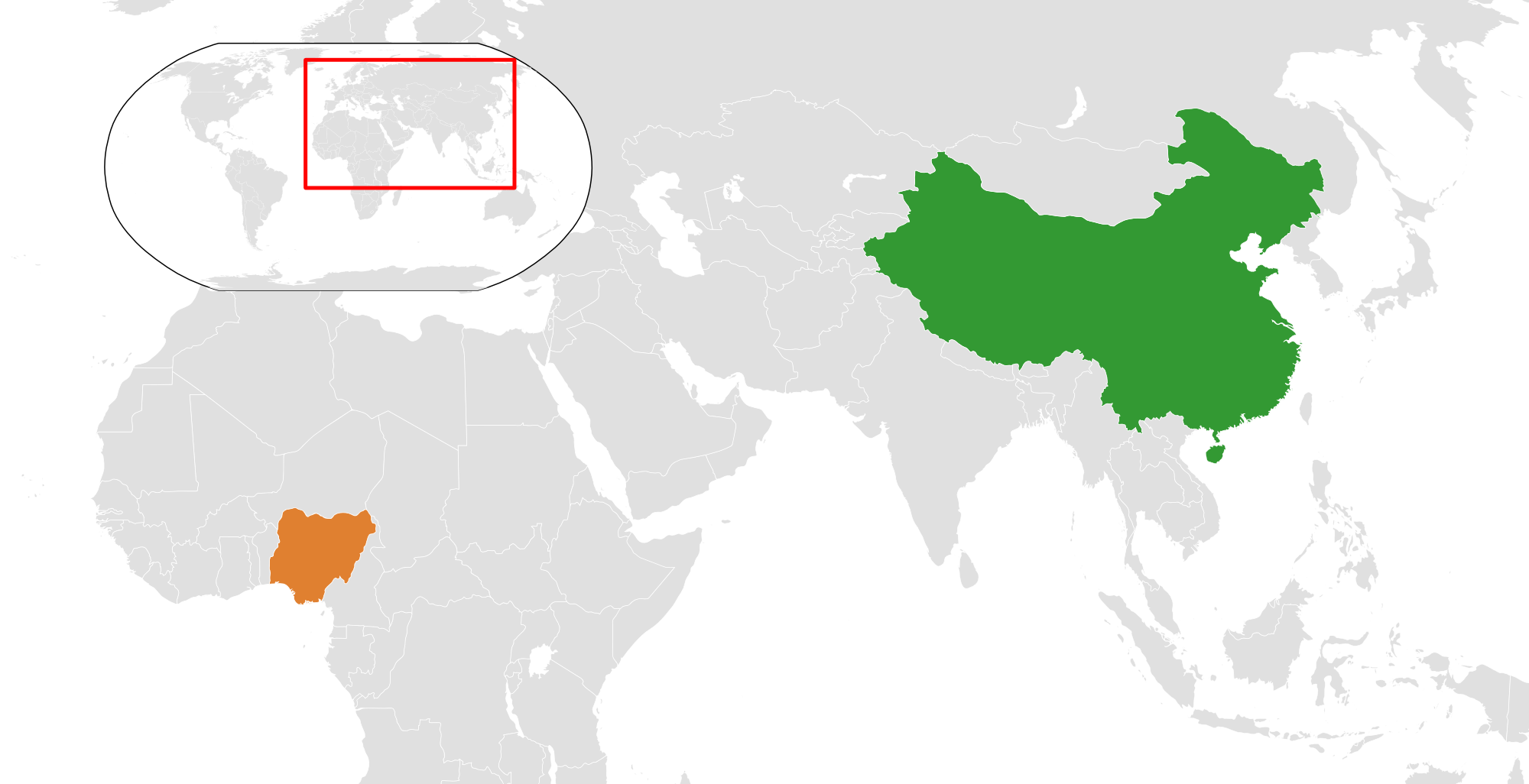

Total population
- 40,000 (2017)

Regions with significant populations
- Lagos, Kano, Abuja, Jos.

Languages
- Cantonese, Mandarin, Nigerian English, Yoruba and other Languages of Nigeria

Religion
- Buddhism, Irreligion and Christianity.

Related ethnic groups
- Chinese diaspora

There is a large population of Chinese people in Nigeria which can include Chinese expatriates and descendants born in Nigeria with Hakka ancestry.

== Migration history ==
In 1930, colonial Nigeria's census showed four Hakka people living there. Hong Kong investors began opening factories in Nigeria as early as the 1950s. By 1965 there were perhaps 200 Chinese people in the country. By 1999, that number had grown to 5,800, including 630 from Taiwan and 1,050 from Hong Kong. The 21st century would be a period of large fluctuations in the Chinese population with both a quick rise and drop. By one estimate the Chinese population reached 100,000 in 2007 according to demography researcher Y.J. Park. The Chinese Ambassador to Nigeria Zhou Pingjian in 2017 noted the community's numbers were in decline with people returning home and gave the embassy's estimate of 40,000.

== Business and employment ==
=== Investors and technical staff ===
One early Hong Kong company in Nigeria was the Li Group. It grew in scale, and by 2011 Kano trade unionists believed it to be the city's largest private employer, with up to 7,000 employees there and 20,000 nationwide. There were a number of other early Chinese entrepreneurs in Nigeria as well. Shen Wenbo (沈文伯) arrived in 1959, and began working in a Lebanese-owned ceramics factory. In 1972, he purchased an enamelware factory, sourcing his materials locally and exporting the finished product to Germany. He later began to import Chinese ceramics to Nigeria, making him possibly the first to introduce them on a commercial scale. He was also the first person of Chinese origin to naturalise as a Nigerian citizen. Zhu Nanyang (朱南揚), a Shanghai native who moved to Hong Kong and then arrived in Nigeria in the 1960s, would go on to head up the Ikeja Industrial Area, a government-sponsored industrial development project established at Ikeja in 1986.

Chinese companies are widely believed to offer worse pay and labour conditions than local or other foreign companies, and to be unwilling to promote locals over Chinese nationals. A scholarly study found corroboration of poor working conditions, with one notorious case being a 2002 fire in a Chinese-owned plastics factory from which 45 workers were unable to escape as they were locked inside by their bosses. However, Chinese companies state that they prefer to recruit and retain local workers as the cost of attracting expatriate talent from China has risen. The Li Group, for example, has a total of about 500 Chinese employees. Another large Chinese company, Lagos-based Golden Telecommunications, employs about 300 Chinese staff, and an equal number of locals; wages are not as good as competitors, but their training programmes are superior.

=== Small vendors ===
Lagos's Chinatown (or China Commercial City, 中国商城) was built in 2004. It was raided in 2006 by Nigerian customs authorities and temporarily shut down. A Nigerian lawyer connected to the raid claims that Chinese were given impunity to sell copyright violating products. Chinese vendors themselves state that they are minimally profitable or unprofitable, and complain of corruption and theft by customs officials. Vendors therein formerly a wide range of products including textiles, doors, electronics, shoes, bags, books, and films, but by 2011, many vendors had closed shop and returned to China; the range of products on offer had also shrunk, with traders stating that the only profitable businesses were those selling shirts, jeans, or shoes.

Other locations with concentrations of Chinese vendors include Old Dragon City (老龙城), New Dragon City (新龙城), and Jinmao Commercial Building (金贸商厦 As of 2006 there were estimated to be about 250 Chinese trading companies operating in Nigeria, with a total turnover of about US$300 million. Such vendors also often find themselves the target of robberies and violent crimes.

=== Migrant labour ===
Chinese labourers in Nigeria are the most controversial category of migrants. They are employed not just by Chinese or other foreign firms, but by indigenous firms as well, including some which proudly advertise their Nigerian roots. One example is Aliko Dangote's Dangote Group, which along with French conglomerate Lafarge attracted protests in Lagos in 2010 for allegedly employing thousands of Chinese workers in semiskilled construction positions. However most anger in such protests is directed at the employers rather than the Chinese workers themselves; they are perceived to be in a similar situation to Nigerians, forced to take difficult jobs far from home in order to make ends meet, and thus attract sympathy as much as resentment. However, there have also been cases of kidnapping against Chinese migrant workers in Nigeria, including three incidents totaling sixteen people in 2007.

== Organisations and media ==
In December 2010, the West Africa and Nigeria Overseas Chinese Joint Association was established in a ceremony in Lagos attended by roughly 100 guests, including representatives of overseas Chinese associations in Senegal, Ghana, Ivory Coast, Mali, and Benin. Other Chinese community organisations in the country include the Nigeria Chinese Business Association (尼日利亚中国商贸企业协会) and the Nigerian Council for the Promotion of Peaceful Reunification of China. In 2008, community organisations and Chinese companies jointly organised a karaoke competition, attracting roughly 300 participants.

The West Africa United Business Weekly, believed to be the first Chinese-language newspaper in west Africa, was established in 2005. China's official People's Daily also sought to form a partnership with Nigerian national newspaper Thisday in 2006.

== Notable people ==
- Brian Fok, Nigerian-born Hong Kong footballer

== See also ==
- Filipinos in Nigeria
- Nigerians in China
- Africans in Guangzhou
- China–Nigeria relations

== Bibliography ==
- Mohan, Giles; Lampert, Ben; Chang, Daphne (September 2011), "Chinese diaspora, African development? Chinese business migrants in Angola, Ghana and Nigeria" (PDF), Rethinking Development in an Age of Scarcity and Uncertainty, University of York
- 莊炎林 [Zhuang Yanlin], ed. (1995), 世界華人精英傳略：大洋洲與非洲卷 [Biographies of Overseas Chinese Elites: Oceania and Africa] (in Traditional Chinese), 百花洲文藝出版社 [Baihuazhou Literature and Art Publishing House], ISBN 978-7-80579-449-5
