= African Chinese =

Ethnic group in China

African Chinese 非裔中國人 / 非裔中国人
- African neighbourhood in Xiaobei, Guangzhou

Regions with significant populations
- Eastern metropolitan areas, including Guangzhou and Shanghai

Languages
- English, Chinese, Igbo, Bambara, French, Arabic

Religion
- Islam, Catholic, Protestant

African Chinese are an ethnic group in China with partial or full ancestry from any of the ethnic groups of Africa.

== Population ==
There are various estimates for the number of Africans living in China. In 2012, scholar Adams Bodomo estimated that there were over 500,000 Africans in China, with a large concentration in Guangzhou. Bodomo’s figure, based primarily on field observations rather than official statistics, has since been criticized for likely overestimating the population, especially given the fluid and transient nature of African migration to China. More recent studies, including work by Roberto Castillo, suggest that the African population in Guangzhou peaked at around 16,000 in 2014 and had fallen to approximately 4,553 by 2020, according to data from the Guangzhou Public Security Bureau.

However, by 2024, the African population in Guangzhou had rebounded to near pre-pandemic levels, driven by the easing of travel restrictions, the reopening of trade routes, and resumed business activity. This marks a recovery from the sharp decline during the COVID-19 pandemic, when the official number had fallen to 4,553 in April 2020—down from 13,652 in December 2019.

== Education in China ==
China has become a major destination for African students, experiencing rapid growth in enrollments since the early 2010s. In 2018, official statistics from China's Ministry of Education reported 81,562 African students enrolled in Chinese universities, marking a 770% increase compared to 1996. By this measure, China had become the third-largest destination for African students globally, after France and the United States. Following 2018, comprehensive official enrollment figures for African students in China have not been consistently released, primarily due to disruptions caused by the COVID-19 pandemic. Many African students either returned home or continued their studies remotely.

== Notable people ==
- Brian Fok
- Godfred Karikari
- Lou Jing
- Eddy Francis
- Ding Hui
- Hao Ge
- Jean Ping

== See also ==
- Africans in Guangzhou
- Racism in China
