= Africans in Hong Kong =

Total population
- 4,697 (2021)

Regions with significant populations
- Tsim Sha Tsui, Yuen Long

Languages
- English, Cantonese, French, Portuguese, Igbo, Yoruba and other languages of Africa

Related ethnic groups
- African diaspora

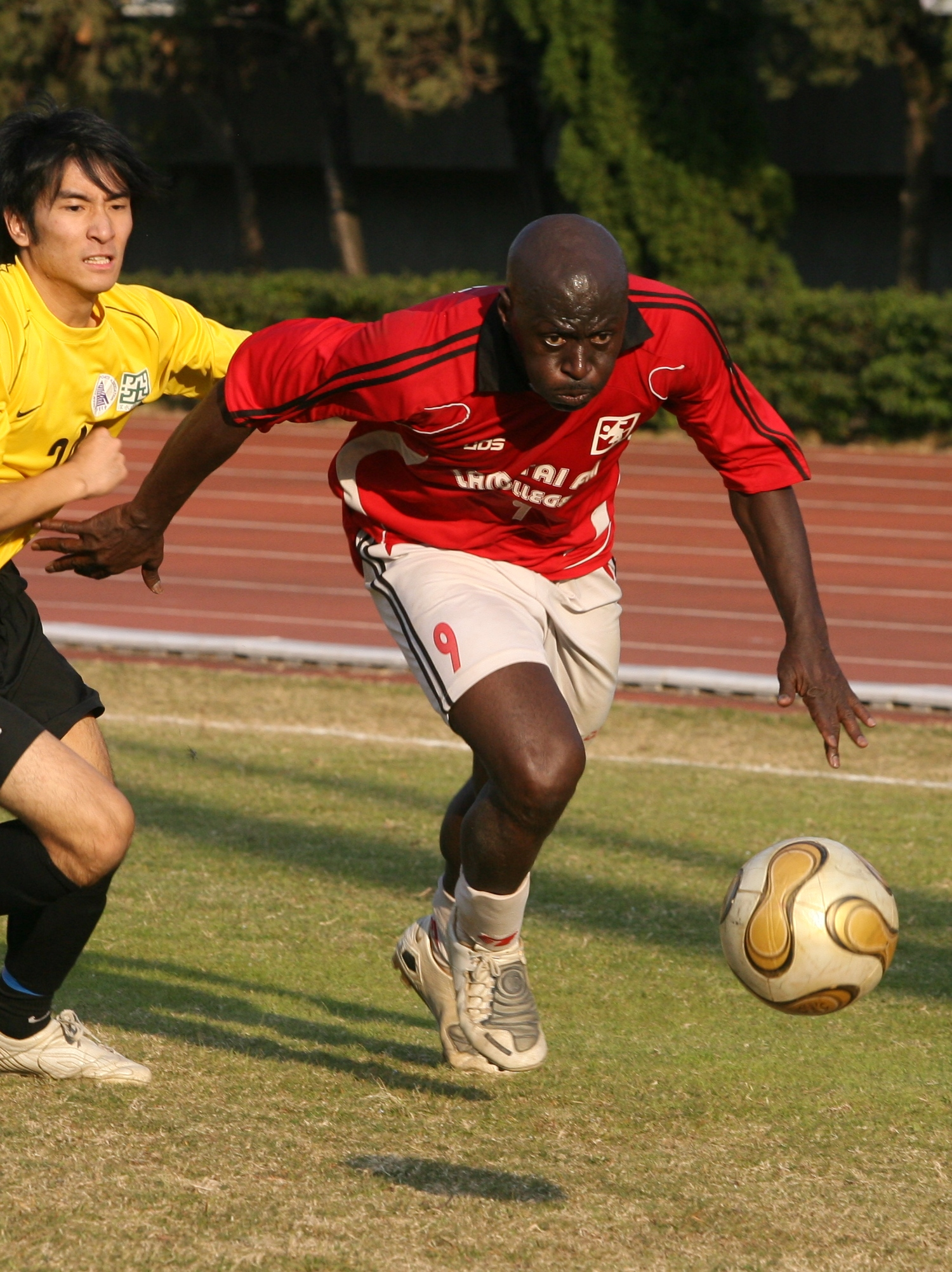
Lawrence Chimezie Akandu

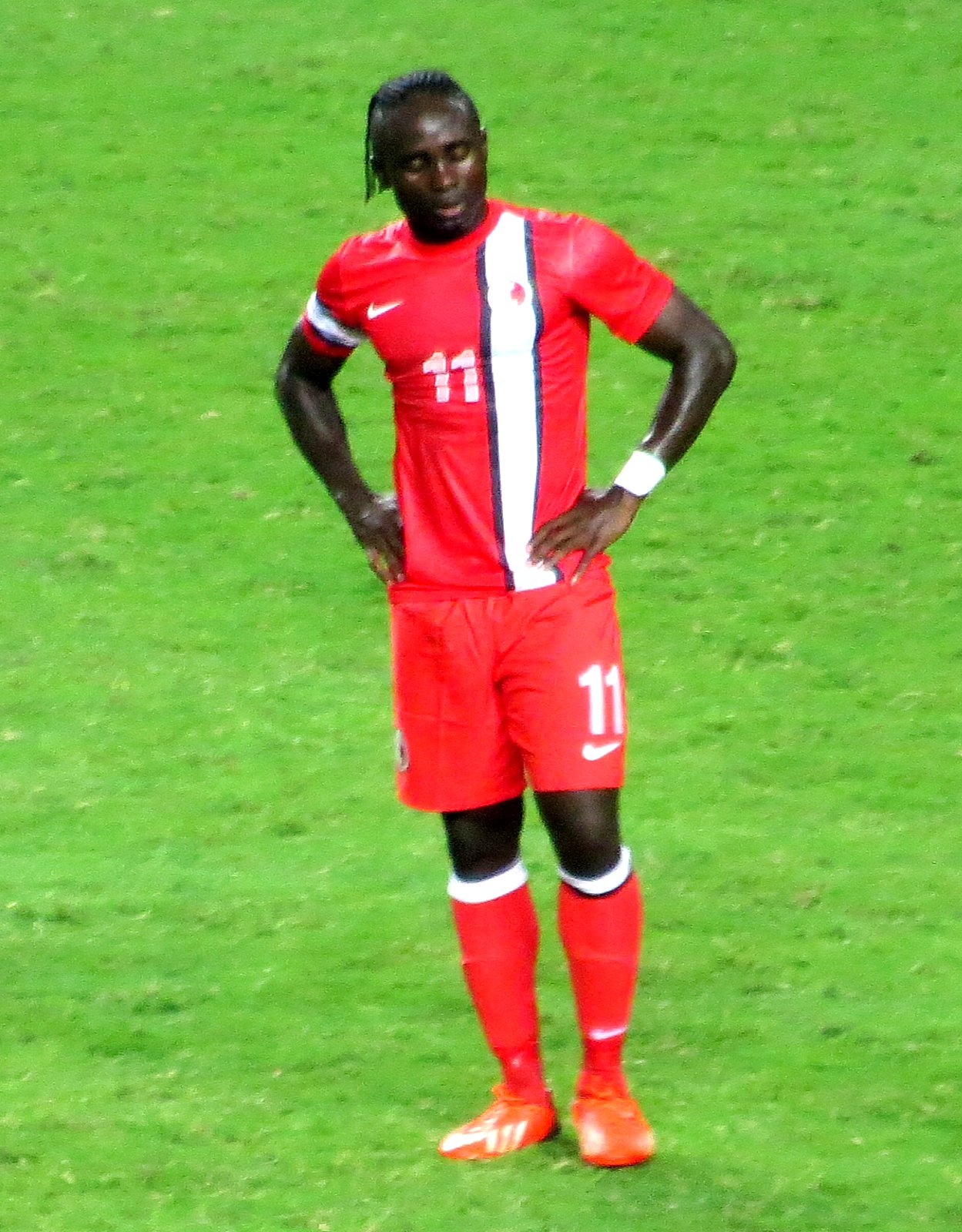
Godfred Karikari

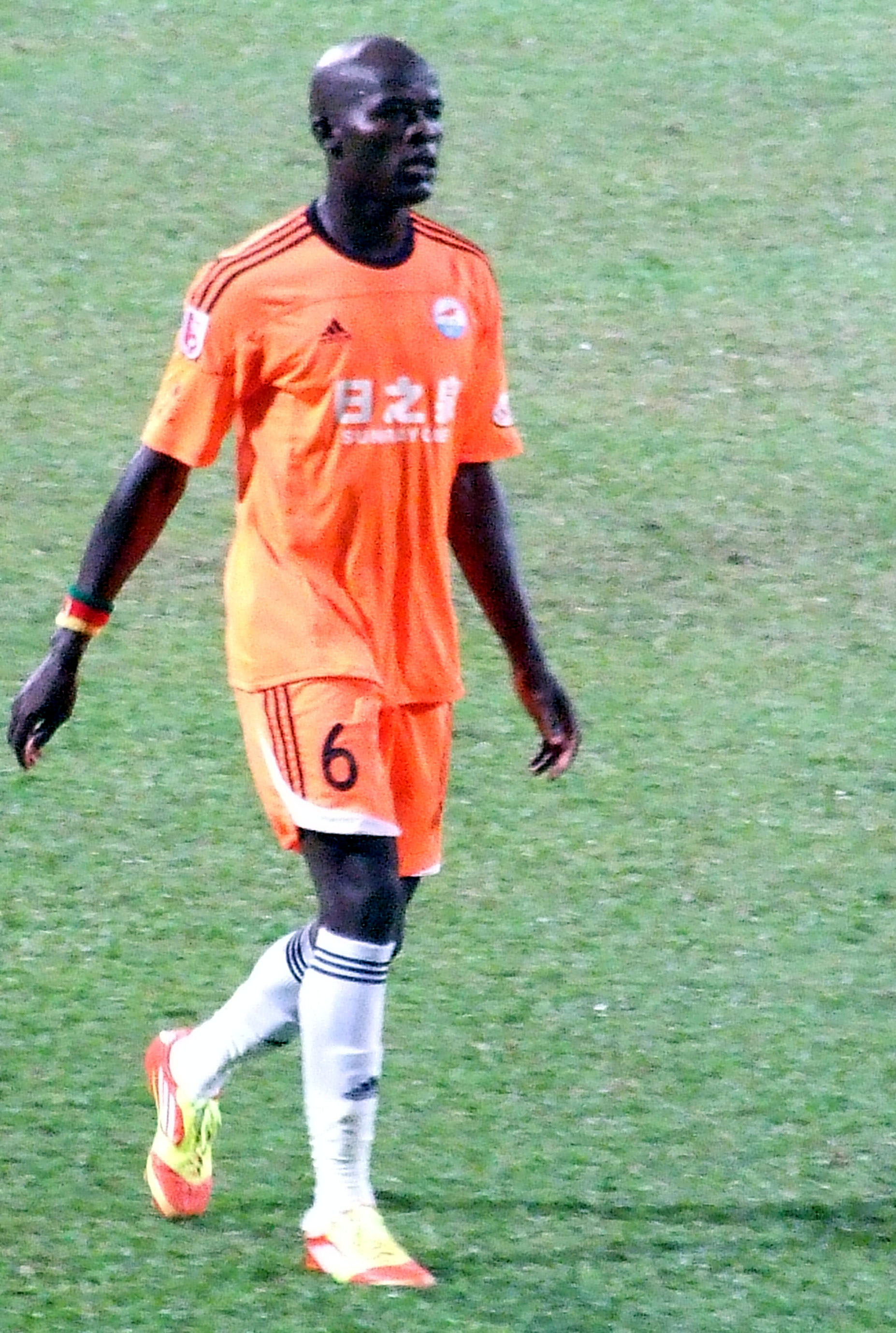
Jean-Jacques Kilama

Africans in Hong Kong constitute a small number of total residents in Hong Kong.

== Population ==
There were a total 4,697 Africans living in Hong Kong in 2021 according to the Africa Center Hong Kong. 3,545 were ordinary residents and 1,052 were non-foulement claimants. Breakdown among the ordinary residents; 1,937 male and 1,708 females. Breakdown among the non-refoulement claimants; 831 male and 221 female The total population includes migrants from Southern Africa, who number around 200 residents and consist mainly of Africans of European origin.

Africans began settling in Hong Kong in the 1990s, arrivals typically being businessmen coming to Hong Kong to engage in trading activities, or to make deals with Mainland China through a middleman. Many stayed, resulting in the majority of people of African descent currently residing in Hong Kong.

About half of the Africans in Hong Kong live in Yuen Long, with another concentration in Chungking Mansions in Kowloon's Tsim Sha Tsui district. Some notable Africans in Hong Kong includes Innocent Mutanga, an investment banker with Goldman Sachs who came to Hong Kong with only 200 HKD and worked his way up from being homeless to becoming one of the elites in Hong Kong and also runs the Africa Center Hong Kong. Historically, many Africans in Hong Kong were traders, dealing in mobile phones and electronic devices for export markets at shops in Chungking Mansions, but this is quickly changing as Africans choose Guangzhou's Xiaobei for this business.

There were 492 complaints of racial discrimination against them from 2015 to 2020.

== See also ==
- Africans in Guangzhou
- Nigerians in China
