= Nigerians in China =

Total population
- c. 10,000 (2014)

Regions with significant populations
- Guangzhou

Languages
- Chinese, Nigerian English, Igbo, and other languages of Nigeriazz

Nigerians in China are people of Nigerian descent who reside in China.

== Population ==
According to Nigerian Senator David Mark, on a delegation visit to China in May 2014, about 10,000 Nigerians are living in China. Nigerians are concentrated in Guangzhou, a city in the Guangdong Province with a large population of Africans. Nigerians make up the largest African population in China.

== See also ==
- Africans in Guangzhou
- African Chinese
- China–Nigeria relations
