= Permanent Resident Card =

Permanent Resident Card or PR Card may refer to:

- Canada permanent resident card
- Foreign Permanent Resident ID Card (China)
- Hong Kong identity card
- Macau Resident Identity Card
- Green card (US)

== See also ==
- Permanent residence (disambiguation)
