= Social Security Card (China) =

Chinese social security smart card and electronic credential

People's Republic of China Social Security Card
- National-emblem side of the current card
- Type: Smart card and electronic credential
- Issued by: Provincial and prefecture-level human resources and social security departments, under a national framework administered by the Ministry of Human Resources and Social Security
- First issued: 1999, in Shanghai
- Purpose: Social insurance, public employment and related public services; financial and other local functions where enabled
- Valid in: Mainland China
- Website: 12333.gov.cn

Social Security Card
- Traditional Chinese: 中華人民共和國社會保障卡
- Simplified Chinese: 中华人民共和国社会保障卡
Transcriptions
Standard Mandarin
- Hanyu Pinyin: Zhōnghuá Rénmín Gònghéguó Shèhuì Bǎozhàng Kǎ
Yue: Cantonese
- Jyutping: zung1 waa4 jan4 man4 gung6 wo4 gwok3 se5 wui6 bou2 zoeng3 kaa1

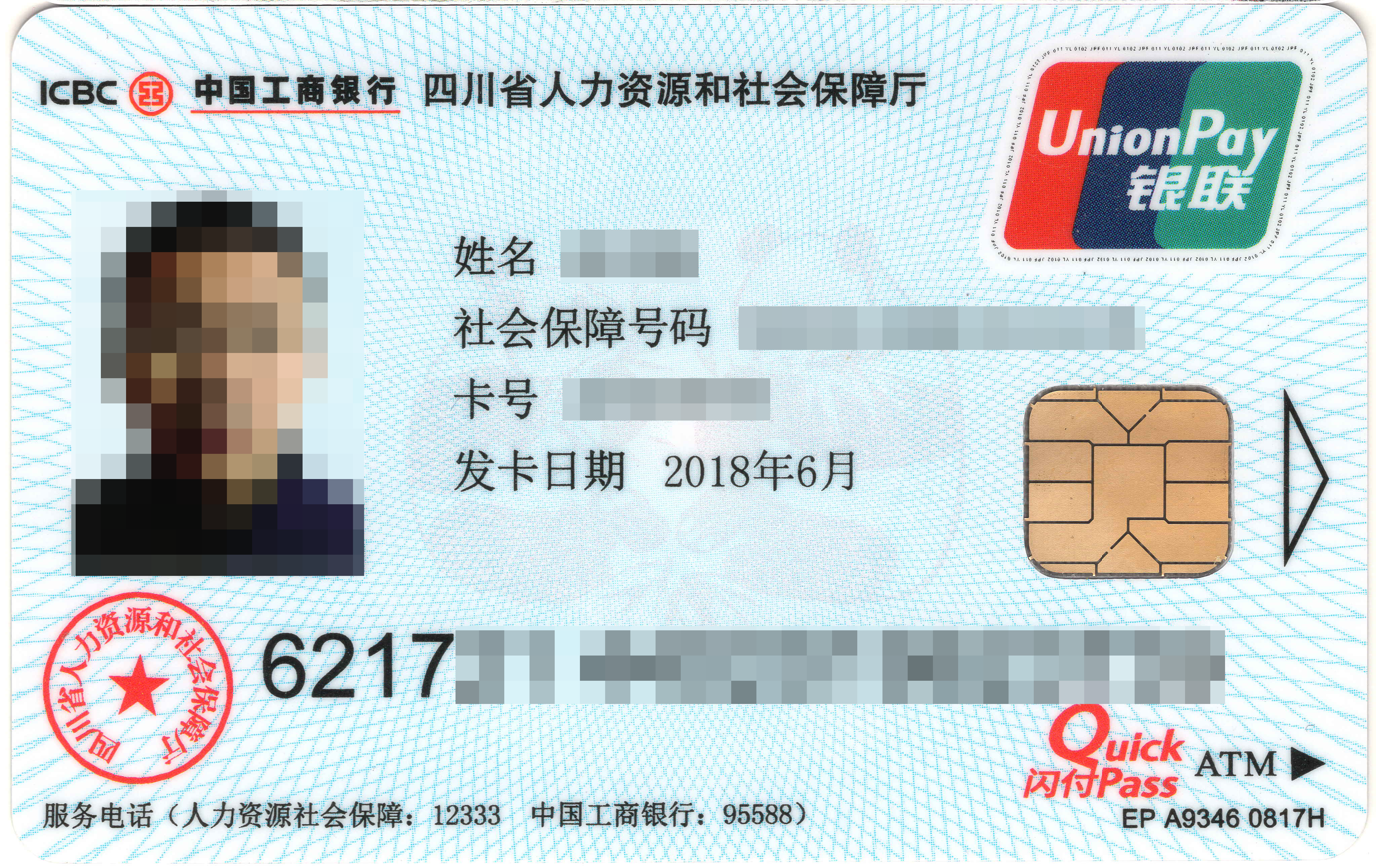
Shebaoka

The People's Republic of China Social Security Card (Chinese: 中华人民共和国社会保障卡), commonly known as the Shebaoka (社保卡), is a government-issued smart card and corresponding electronic credential used in mainland China. It is primarily used for social insurance, medical services, public employment and other human-resources. Under national administrative rules, the card is issued to members of the public according to common national standards, while provincial and prefecture-level human resources and social security departments are responsible for issuance and application within their jurisdictions.

== History ==
China's first social security card was issued in Shanghai in 1999. In December 1999, the then Ministry of Labour and Social Security issued a national development plan for the system. The plan required regions intending to issue cards to prepare local implementation plans and established a registration system for card-issuing authorities.

In 2011, the Ministry of Human Resources and Social Security adopted national administrative rules governing card issuance, production, use and security. In the same year, the ministry and the People's Bank of China introduced a framework for adding banking functions to social security cards. Financial-function cards were designed to contain both the social-security application and a banking application on a single chip. Pilot implementation was scheduled for 2011 and 2012, followed by broader issuance of single-chip cards from 2013.

The first nationally issued electronic social security card was issued on 22 April 2018 at the first Digital China Summit in Fuzhou. In 2019, the Ministry of Human Resources and Social Security ordered nationwide implementation of the electronic card. The ministry defined it as the online form of the physical card, with a one-to-one relationship between the two and common status and functions, supported by a national social security card service platform.

A national programme for third-generation social security cards was announced in 2020 by the Ministry of Human Resources and Social Security and the People's Bank of China. The policy called for newly issued, replaced and reissued cards from 2021 onward to use third-generation specifications supporting China's SM-series cryptographic algorithms. The transition was intended to take place through normal issuance and replacement rather than compulsory mass replacement of cards that were still valid.

As of June 2026, the Ministry of Human Resources and Social Security reported 1.39 billion social security card holders nationwide, of whom 1.114 billion had obtained an electronic social security card. The ministry also reported that 189 nationwide services had been made available through the social security card system.

== Design and identification ==
The Ministry of Human Resources and Social Security is responsible for nationwide administration of social security card issuance and application. Provincial and prefecture-level human resources and social security departments may issue cards after receiving approval from the ministry, and are responsible for local administration and technical implementation. Local authorities also establish detailed rules covering eligibility, applications, permitted uses, validity periods, loss reporting and replacement, which means some administrative procedures differ between regions.

The physical card uses a nationally standardized design. Under the 2011 administrative rules, the side bearing the national emblem carries the words 中华人民共和国社会保障卡 ("Social Security Card of the People's Republic of China"), while personalized information includes the holder's name, social security number, photograph and issuing authority.

For Chinese citizens with a citizen identification number, Article 58 of the Social Insurance Law of the People's Republic of China provides that the citizen identification number serves as the individual's national social security number. Foreign nationals covered by Chinese social insurance instead receive a number constructed according to separate rules using a country or territory code and the number of a valid passport or permanent residence document.

== Functions and reception ==
The core functions of the social security card are information recording, information queries and the processing of human-resources and social-security services. Under the 2023 social-insurance regulations, it can serve as a credential in connection with basic old-age insurance, basic medical insurance, work-injury insurance, unemployment insurance and maternity insurance and the receipt of related benefits. The card is not restricted to Chinese citizens: foreign nationals employed in China who participate in the Chinese social-insurance system are assigned social security numbers and are issued social security cards under separate rules.

Cards equipped with the financial application can also function as debit cards. The 2011 framework specifies a renminbi-denominated debit application permitting cash withdrawals, transfers and purchases, but not credit functions. The banking application and the social-security application can reside on the same chip while remaining separately managed, including separate cryptographic key-management systems under the responsibility of human resources and social security authorities and participating banks respectively.

Additional public-service functions vary by region. For example, Beijing's third-generation cards support functions including public transport and annual park passes in addition to medical, social-security and financial applications.

The central government has also promoted broader cross-regional and cross-department use of the card. In 2024, the Ministry of Human Resources and Social Security stated a policy objective of achieving a basic nationwide "all-in-one" social security card service framework by 2027, with expansion into areas including medical services, transportation and cultural services.
