= Hu Jieguo =

Nigerian Chinese businessman

- Born: 1948 (age 77–78); Shanghai, China
- Other names: Jacob C.K. Wood Baba Ase
- Education: Shanghai Jinyuan Middle School
- Occupation: Businessman
- Parent: Hu Pieyu

Hu Jieguo (Chinese: 胡杰国; pinyin: Hú jiéguó) (born 1948 whose English name is Jacob Wood) is a Nigerian Chinese chief, businessman and president of the Nigeria Chinese Chamber of Commerce, and an overseas Chinese leader. As of 2015, he may have been the only tribal chief of Chinese origin in Africa.

== Early years ==
Hu Jieguo was born in 1948 and grew up with his mother and siblings in Shanghai. In 1962, he was among the first batch of workers, peasants and soldiers who entered college during the latter part of the Cultural Revolution as he joined Shanghai Jingyuan Middle School. He later graduated in 1972 as an English major and was a teacher at Shanghai Nanhai Middle School for 7 years.

Hu Jieguo's father, Hu Pieyu, had left for Hong Kong which at that time was a British colony to start a textile business. In the 1960s however, due to the economic recession in Hong Kong, he went to Nigeria and has co-opened the largest local textile processing factory in Nigeria. He gained a good reputation in the local area including befriending politicians like Olusegun Obasanjo, who later became president of Nigeria. Hu Pieyu hoped that his son would succeed him, but Hu Jieguo himself was not willing. It was not until 1978 that Feng Yujiu, the then Chinese Ambassador to Nigeria, advised Hu Jieguo to travel to Nigeria to reunite with his father.

Hu Jieguo worked in a Shangri-La restaurant in Lagos, and soon made it to manager. He then left to study hotel management in Canada. Upon his return to Lagos, he invested $8 million to build the Golden Gate Restaurant and Hotel in 1997.

== In business ==
With his investment in Golden Gate Restaurants and Hotels, Hu expanded the family's network and strengthened the ties between Chinese and Nigerian companies and politicians.

Since 1998, Hu has helped Chinese companies invest in Nigeria. A 3,000 km railway reconstruction and maintenance project undertaken by China Civil Engineering Construction Corporation in Nigeria was negotiated with the help of Hu Jieguo and at the time, was the largest project undertaken by a Chinese enterprise in Africa. Hu also received a delegation from the China National Petroleum Corporation and introduced them to Nigeria's Federal Ministry of Petroleum Resources.

He has additionally worked with Chinese provinces like Shandong to organise commodity fairs, and open industrial estates in Nigeria, thus attracting private Chinese companies.

== Chieftaincy ==
In 1999, during Obasanjo's presidency and Bola Tinubu's the governorship of Lagos, Hu was involved in the reconstruction and development of more than 20 secondary schools.

In 2001, acknowledging Hu's contributions, the head chief of the Yorubas in Lagos awarded him a chieftaincy title, approved by the governor. At the ceremony, which Hu attended in the traditional attire of the Yoruba, the head chief offered him several titles to choose from. Hu picked Baba Ase, meaning "service chief" saying he wanted to “serve the people in Africa”.

Hu Jieguo had a great influence on Nigeria's politics and has made many economic contributions. In addition, he can communicate with people proficiently in Hausa.

Hu Jieguo currently has an armed guard of nearly a hundred people specially approved by relevant Nigerian departments and under his full command.

== Other works ==
In July 2004, the President of Nigeria, Olusegun Obasanjo appointed Hu Jieguo as presidential adviser, responsible for the development of small and medium-sized enterprises (SMEs) and also promote economic and trade exchanges between China and Nigeria. In April 2005, Hu Jieguo accompanied the President of Nigeria on his visit to China. In November 2011, Hu Jieguo was one of the recipients of Nigeria's 2010-2011 "National Honor Award".

During the 2015 Ebola virus outbreak in West Africa, Hu Jieguo temporarily closed his newly opened four-star hotel for safety concerns. The President of Liberia requested assistance from China, with China sending reinforcements and medical teams but the team needed accommodation and the capital of Liberia, Monrovia was almost empty and it was difficult to purchase items. On receiving the news, Hu Jieguo, who was in Canada, travelled to Liberia and personally purchased food items for the Chinese medical team.

Hu Jieguo is currently the president of the Nigeria-China Chamber of Commerce, the president of the Nigeria-China Friendship Association and the chairman of the West African Unified Business News.
