= Lou Jing (singer) =

- Also known as: Vicky Lou
- Born: 1989 (age 35–36)
- Origin: Shanghai, China
- Genres: Pop
- Occupation(s): Student, reality TV show contestant
- Years active: 2009 – present

Lou Jing
- Simplified Chinese: 娄婧
- Traditional Chinese: 婁婧
Transcriptions
Standard Mandarin
- Hanyu Pinyin: Lóu Jìng

Lou Jing (born 1989), also known as Vicky Lou, is a Chinese talent show contestant from Shanghai. She was born to a Chinese mother and an African American father. Her father left China before she was born and the two have not remained in contact. Her mother raised her as a single mother. She entered the Shanghai-based Dragon TV's Go Oriental Angel talent quest in August 2009, where she became one of the five finalists from Shanghai.

Dubbed the "Black Pearl" and "Chocolate Girl" on the show, her rise to fame culminated in heated discussions in the Chinese blogosphere. While some comments on internet forums expressed support, some commenters insulted Lou and her mother with racist remarks. Her attention in the media opened serious debates about racism in China and racial prejudice.

== Fame and racist uproar ==
Lou entered Shanghai's Go Oriental Angel program in August 2009 and reached the top-five in the Shanghai region. Initially hosts of the show were baffled by her skin colour and questioned her background and the origins of her father. Through the exposure she received on the show, she gained attention as a human interest story and granted several interviews to television stations. The media attention resulted in mass discussions on the Chinese language internet, but soon spreading to the English language internet and media. On November 1, British newspaper The Guardian reported that Lou had emerged as the most famous talent show contestant in China and has become the subject of intense debate because of her skin colour.

She ranked as one of the top 30 contestants before being eliminated from the competition. Rumours flared on cyberspace, allegedly citing a press report, that Lou's mother engaged in an extra-marital affair with an African American, resulting in the birth of Lou. Subsequently, a blog entitled "Could Lou Jing's dad be Obama?", where the author of the blog used many sarcastic remarks to ridicule Lou, received particular notoriety. Another blog, titled Lou Jing's American black father and Shanghai mother, appeared on Tianya, a popular Chinese internet forum, and garnered over 40,000 hits, with many vicious racist attacks made on Lou based on her dark skin. Racial slurs such as xiaoheigui (小黑鬼 xiǎohēiguǐ; lit. Little black devil) were made about her. Other bloggers wrote comments such as "Numb! This bitch still has the audacity to appear on television! I don't know what to say! One cannot be shameless to this kind of level!" Lou initially did not discover these comments on the internet until her friends contacted her with messages of support. She also remarked that it was the first time she has experienced such racial hatred in her life."The whole thing was a big bomb to my family and me, and it caused great harm," Lou told Neteast News on Sept 14.

On August 31, 2009, someone posted a "Four Point Announcement" on KDS (a Shanghai local forum) under the name "Lou Jing," which led more controversy to this incident. The post titled "I am Lou Jing from ‘Oriental Angels’, I am making an announcement here" claimed that "I am a native Shanghainese." The "Four Point Announcement" later attracted more online attacks against Lou, saying that she is the racist one. However, in the interview with NetEase, Lou Jing proved that the announcement was fabricated.

China Daily columnist Raymond Zhou remarked that the backlash on the internet was caused by numerous factors, including China's homogeneity, her "non-Chinese" appearance and her mother's associations with a foreigner, but more relevantly, her dark skin from her father. Zhou opined that China's intolerance is color-based, where people value lighter skin and thus discriminate against darker skin. He further commented that this trend is "not totally race based," as the Chinese are biased against other darker skinned Chinese, especially women, and that he believes this to be an "offshoot of class discrimination" because historically, lower class laborers who usually worked outdoors often had darker skin due to constant exposure to the sun. Zhou was one of several media commentators in China who responded to the hostile reactions in the blogosphere. Zhou wrote that it was "high time [we] introduced some sensitivity training on races and ethnicities if we are going to latch on to the orbit of globalization." Author Hung Huang wrote on her blog, "In the same year that Americans welcome Barack Obama to the White House, we can't even accept this girl with a different skin colour." In the mainstream Chinese media, Lou Jing also had many supporters.

In an interview with Chinese internet portal Netease, Lou discussed her background and how her skin colour has affected her since childhood. She responded to a hoax declaration widely circulated on the internet that proclaimed in her name that her father is "American, and not African". She replied, "Isn't it kind of stupid to say it now since China is America's biggest creditor?" When asked whether she agrees about being "a native of Shanghai", she remarked "I'm a Chinese person born and raised in China," adding that her best friends are from Anhui and Henan. She also remarked that she was grateful that her parents gave birth to her, and played down racial discrimination, saying it has been overblown by false press reports.

Lou received an internship offer from Shanghai television station Dragon TV after the show. She has since become a co-host of the show News Surfing Intelligence, a local Shanghai program. In an interview with the BBC's Matthew Bannister, she remarked that racial discrimination is present in all countries of the world, but in China it seems particularly focused towards people of an African background due to the assumption that Africa is less developed. She said that she found it interesting children of mixed Chinese-white parents do not receive nearly as much negative attention.

Lou Jing is not the first Chinese person of African descent to have received widespread media attention in recent years. In June 2009, the entrance of Ding Hui (Chinese: 丁慧), a black man from Hangzhou, to the China men's national volleyball team also gained significant coverage on Chinese media.

== Personal ==
Lou Jing has a very close relationship with her mother, a native Shanghai woman. Her mother appeared at all of her shows in support of her. Lou had a timid personality before appearing as a TV contestant, and is sensitive towards outside criticism, though she maintains an air of optimism. Lou Jing speaks fluent Shanghainese and Mandarin.

== See also ==
- Racism in the People's Republic of China
- Africans in Guangzhou
- Hao Ge (Brother Hao)
- Ding Hui
