= Permanent residence =

Permanent residence may refer to:

- Permanent Residence, a 2009 Hong Kong film

It may also refer to:

- Permanent residency
  - Australian permanent resident
  - Permanent residency in Canada
  - Permanent residents (Jammu and Kashmir) (India)
  - New Zealand permanent residency
  - Permanent residency in Singapore
  - Indefinite leave to remain (UK)
  - Permanent residence (United States)
  - Permanent Resident Card (disambiguation)
- Institute of permanent residence as a variant of habitual residence in various countries law systems
