= Hao Ge =

Nigerian Chinese-language singer

Brother Hao
- Also known as: Hao Ge, Brother Hao
- Born: Emmanuel Uwechue; 1973 (age 52–53); Lagos, Nigeria
- Origin: Nigeria
- Genres: Mandopop; Country
- Occupation: Singer
- Instrument: Vocals
- Years active: 2006–present

Emmanuel Uwechue, known by his stage name Brother Hao (Chinese: 郝歌; pinyin: Hǎo Gē), is a Nigerian singer. He rose to fame through a performance with Han Hong on the CCTV New Year's Gala and has emerged as one of the most notable foreign singers in China.

== Career ==
Uwechue began his singing career in the choir at House on the Rock Pentecostal Church in Lagos, Nigeria. He received a degree in engineering, and began to pursue a singing career, which led his father to disown him. Before getting his career off the ground in China, he was a country music singer. In 2001, a friend advised Uwechue to move to Beijing, where he started performing at bars and hotels. At the Big Easy Bar in Beijing in 2006, he was discovered by Liu Huan, a well-known music producer, who helped him learn Mandarin Chinese. In the same year, he participated in the TV show Xing Guang Da Dao.

In 2011, a video of Uwechue singing the Mao-era patriotic song Without the Communist Party, There Would Be No New China was posted on YouTube. It became a viral video, and helped to increase his fame on the Internet both within and outside China. "非洲小伙好兄弟 唱红歌已无法自拔"

== Discography ==
- Red and Black (2006)
- Hao Ge’s Latest Songs (2008)
- Beloved Life (2009)

== See also ==
- Lou Jing
