= China–Nigeria relations =

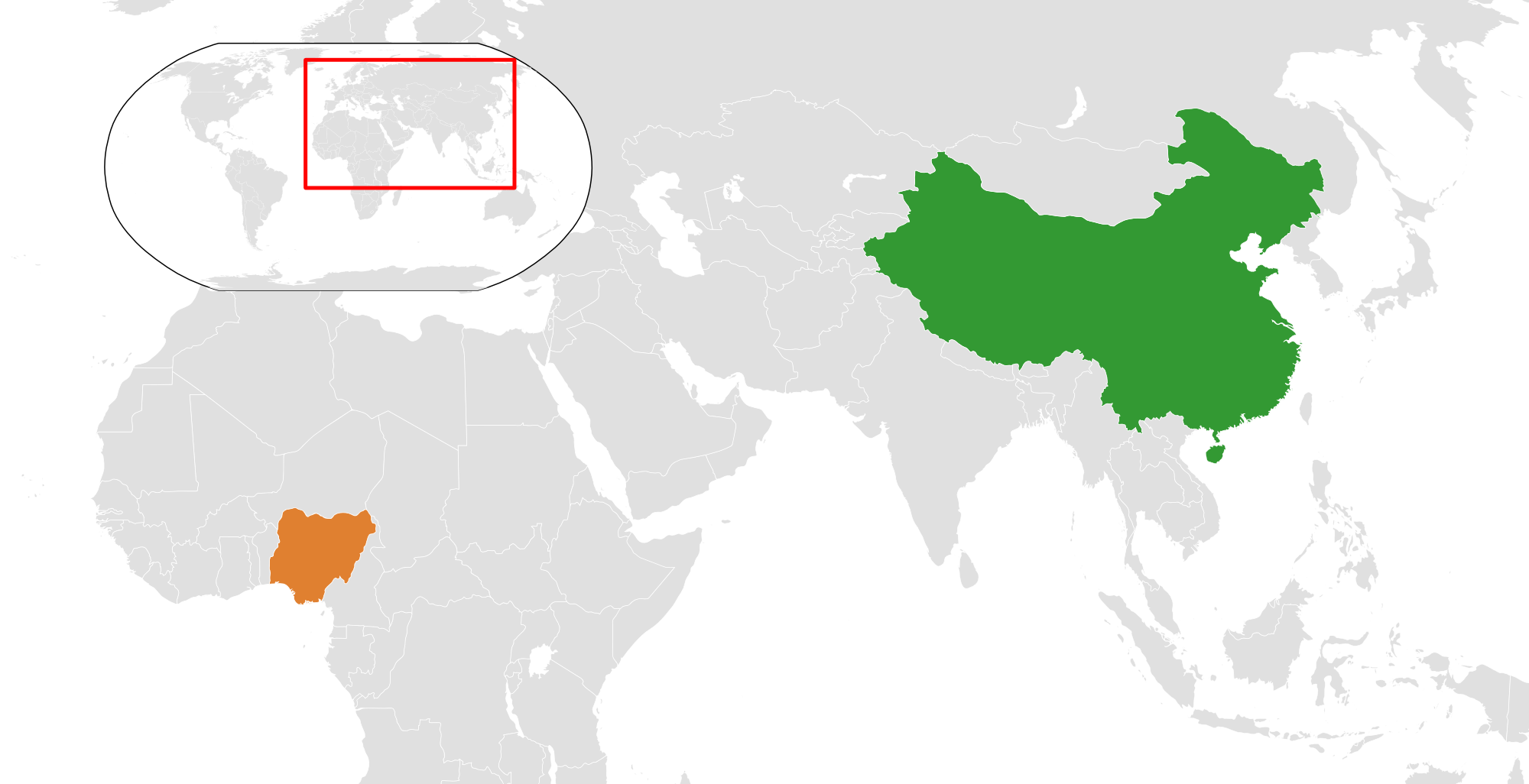

- China: Nigeria

The People's Republic of China and the Federal Republic of Nigeria established diplomatic relations on 10 February 1971 - a decade after Nigeria gained its independence from the British Empire. Relations between Nigeria and China have expanded on growing bilateral trade and strategic cooperation. China is also one of Nigeria's important trading and export partners.

Although Nigeria maintains trade relations with Taiwan, and has a representative office in Taipei, it issued a joint communiqué with China in 2005, reaffirming that Beijing was "the only legitimate government representing the whole of China and Taiwan is an unalienable part of its territory".

Nigeria has an embassy in Beijing, a consulate in Guangzhou, and consulates-general in Shanghai and Hong Kong. China has an embassy in Abuja and a consulate-general in Lagos.

== History ==
Nigeria and the People's Republic of China established formal diplomatic relations on February 10, 1971. Relations between the two nations grew closer as a result of the international isolation and Western condemnation of Nigeria's military dictatorships (1970s-1998). Nigeria has since become an important source of oil and petroleum for China's rapidly growing economy and Nigeria is looking to China for help in achieving high economic growth; China has provided extensive economic, military, and political support.

In 1996, as the Clinton administration lobbied in favor of sanctions against Nigeria. China, along with West-European countries, were unfavorable to a global freeze of Nigerian assets.

In 2004 and again in 2006, Chinese President Hu Jintao made state visits to Nigeria and addressed a joint session of the National Assembly of Nigeria. Both nations signed a memorandum of understanding on establishing a strategic partnership. China has supported Nigeria's bid for a seat in the U.N. Security Council. As of February 2013, the Chinese Ambassador in Nigeria was Deng Boqing.

In response to the hesitation of the United States and other Western countries to aid Nigeria in their efforts to combat insurgents in the oil-rich Niger Delta region, the Nigerian government has developed close military cooperation with China, which has supplied arms, equipment, training, and technology to the Nigerian armed forces. Both nations also signed a US$311 million agreement to develop cooperation in communications and space programs; China helped develop and launch the Nigerian communications satellite (NigComSat-1) by 2007 to expand cellular and internet networks in Central Africa.

In January 2017, the Nigerian government ordered Taiwan to move its unofficial embassy out of Abuja and into Lagos (Nigeria's economic center), stating that the African country was a defender of the One-China vision. This order came after Nigeria obtained a $40 billion investment pledge from China. Taiwan was required to rename the unofficial embassy (the "Business Delegation of the ROC in the Federal Republic of Nigeria") to the "Trade Representative Office of Taipei in Lagos").

In 2021, the two countries celebrated their 50 years of official relations.

== Treatment of Nigerians in China ==
In April 2020, the foreign minister, Geoffrey Onyeama, condemned China's discriminatory attitude towards Nigerians, after a video emerged on the web showing Nigerian residents in China being discriminated against by locals. While Chinese officials said they took the issue very seriously, they also blamed Western media for emphasizing isolated events to feed a PR smear campaign over its Nigerian interests.

In November 2020, the Chinese government blocked entry to China for all foreigners, including Nigerians, over COVID-19 concerns, except for "essential services" including diplomatic service.

It was reported that Nigerians in China were placed on lockdown for more than the average 2-week quarantine a Chinese citizen would experience.

== Economic relations ==
Countries which signed cooperation documents related to the Belt and Road Initiative

Bilateral trade reached US$3 billion in 2006 – up from $384 million in 1998. During Chinese President Hu Jintao's visit in 2006, China secured four oil drilling licenses and agreed to invest $4 billion in oil and infrastructure development projects in Nigeria, and both nations agreed to a four-point plan to improve bilateral relations – a key component of which was to expand trade and investments in agriculture, telecommunications, energy, and infrastructure development. Furthermore, China agreed to buy a controlling stake in the Kaduna oil refinery that would produce 110,000 barrels per day (17,000 m^{3}/d). Nigeria also promised to give preference to Chinese oil firms for contracts for oil exploration in the Niger Delta and Chad Basin. In 2006, China also agreed to grant a loan of $1 billion to Nigeria to help it upgrade and modernize its railway networks. In 2005, Nigeria agreed to supply PetroChina with 30,000 barrels per day (4,800 m^{3}/d) of oil for $800 million. In 2006, the CNOOC purchased a share for $2.3 billion in an oil exploration block owned by a former defence minister. China has also pledged to invest $267 million to build the Lekki free trade zone near Lagos. However, the "flooding" of Nigerian markets with cheap Chinese goods has become a sensitive political issue, as – combined with the importation of second-hand European products – it has adversely affected domestic industries, especially in textiles, and led to the closure of 65 textile mills and the laying-off of 150,000 textile workers over the course of a decade. Nigerian militants have also threatened to attack Chinese workers and projects in the Niger Delta. In 2010, trade between the two countries was worth US$7.8 billion. In 2011, Nigeria was the 4th largest trading partner of China in Africa and in the first 8 months of 2012, it was the 3rd.

In April 2018, Nigeria signed a $2.4-billion currency swap deal valid for 3 years. In 2019, bilateral trade between China and Nigeria reached $19.27 billion.

Nigeria joined the Belt and Road Initiative (BRI) in 2018.

=== Chinese development finance to Nigeria ===
From 2000 to 2011, there were approximately 40 Chinese official development finance projects identified in Nigeria through various media reports. These projects ranged from a $2.5 billion loan for Nigerian rail, power, or telecommunications projects in 2008, to an MoU for $1 billion for the construction of houses and water supply in Abuja in 2009, and several rail networks.

Since 2000, trade relations have risen exponentially. There has been an increase in total trade of over 10,384 million dollars between the two nations from 2000 to 2016. However, the structure of the China-Nigerian trade relationship has become a major political issue because Chinese exports accounted for around 80 percent of total bilateral trade volumes. This has resulted in a serious trade imbalance with Nigeria importing ten times more than it exports to China. Nigeria's economy is becoming over-reliant on cheap foreign imports to sustain itself, resulting in a clear decline in Nigerian Industry under such arrangements. In September 2018, Nigeria signed a $328 million loan with China to heavily boost the development of telecommunication infrastructures in Nigeria.

China provided the financing for the following projects in Nigeria:

- Abuja-Kaduna Railway, Abuja Metro Light Rail, Abuja and Port Harcourt Airport terminals
- Lekki Free Trade Zones, Ogun – Guangdong
- Zungeru Hydro Power Dam
- University of Transportation, Daura

In exchange, Nigeria often/systematically hires a Chinese firm to oversee its development projects, such as the 3,050 MW Mambilla hydroelectric Power Station.

=== Chinese military equipment sales ===
In 2015, a China-made drone crashed in the countryside of Nigeria. It is believed the drone was involved in Nigeria's struggle against the Islamic militant group, Boko Haram. China supplied the CH-3 to Nigeria's government prior to 2014, along with YC-200 guided bombs and AR-1 air-to-ground missiles.

In 2020, the Nigerian Air Force (NAF) Chief, Air Marshal Sadique Abubakar, disclosed that the NAF has concluded the acquisition of eight Wing Loong II, CH-4, and CH-3 drones.

== Space cooperation ==
In 2006, Nigeria obtained $200 million in preferential buyer's credit from the Export-Import Bank of China to help fund its first communication satellite. Nigerian scientists received training in China regarding satellite construction and design. The satellite was manufactured by China Great Wall Industry Corporation. The satellite successfully launched in 2007, but failed the next year due to problems with its solar arrays. Funded by insurance proceeds, a replacement was launched from China in 2011.

In 2018, Nigeria signed an agreement with China to purchase two communications satellites with funds provided the Export-Import Bank of China. In exchange, China will receive part ownership of Nigerian Communications Satellite, a Nigerian government-owned company that manages satellite communications.

As of mid-2019, China had provided 500 Nigerian students with scholarships for training as space engineers.

== Political relations ==
Nigeria follows the one China principle. It recognizes the People's Republic of China as the sole government of China and Taiwan as an integral part of China's territory, and supports all efforts by the PRC to "achieve national reunification". It also considers Hong Kong, Xinjiang and Tibet to be China's internal affairs.

In July 2019, UN ambassadors of 37 countries, including Nigeria, signed a joint letter to the United Nations Human Rights Council defending China's persecution of Uyghurs. Nigeria was one of 16 countries that defended China in 2019 but did not do so in 2020.

== Public opinion ==
A survey published in 2026 by the Pew Research Center found that 78% of Nigerians had a favorable view of China, while 17% had an unfavorable view.

== See also ==
- Africans in Guangzhou
