= Sanyuanli Subdistrict =

Subdistrict in Guangzhou, People's Republic of China

Sanyuanli Subdistrict 三元里街道
- Subdistrict
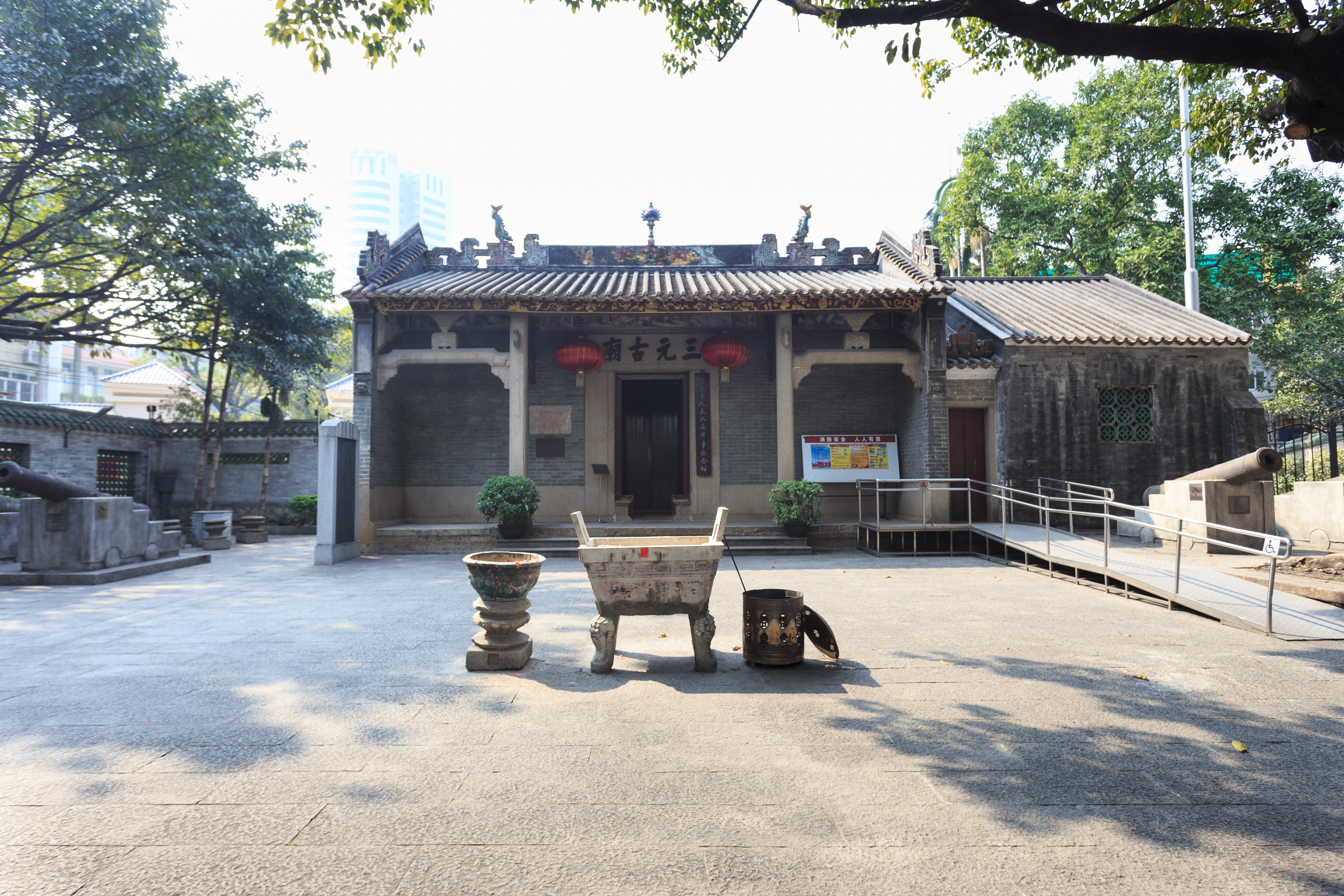
- Interactive map of Sanyuanli Subdistrict
- Coordinates: 23°09′48″N 113°15′30″E
- Country: People's Republic of China
- Province: Guangdong
- Sub-provincial city: Guangzhou
- District: Baiyun

Area
  - Total: 6.8 km^{2} (2.6 sq mi)
- Time zone: UTC+8 (China Standard Time)

Sanyuanli Subdistrict (Chinese: 三元里街道; pinyin: Sānyuánlǐ Jiēdào; Jyutping: saam^{1} jyun^{4} lei^{5} gaai^{1} dou^{6}) is a subdistrict of Baiyun District, Guangzhou, People's Republic of China. As of 2020, it has 13 residential communities (社区) under its administration.

== Local African community ==
Sanyuanli is one of the neighborhoods in Guangzhou with a relatively large African migrant community.

On May 20, 2025, rumors went viral online of over 3000 police officers raiding Sanyuanli in an effort to deport illegal migrants. On May 27, 2025, the subdistrict government dismissed these claims as false, noting the increased presence of police was due to security for the subdistrict's reconstruction efforts, and were unrelated to illegal migrants in the area.

== See also ==
- List of township-level divisions of Guangdong
