= Immigration to China =

Immigration to the People's Republic of China (PRC) is the international movement of non-Chinese nationals in order to reside permanently in the country.

In the late 1970s, roughly 300,000 ethnic Chinese emigrated from Vietnam to China. Immigration has increased modestly since the opening up of the country and the liberalization of the economy, mostly of people moving to the large cities and to Hong Kong. Many of the foreign nationals who immigrate to China are of Chinese ethnic heritage. China has also been the destination of illegal immigration, particularly along the China–North Korea border, Guangzhou, Guangxi Province, and the China-Myanmar border.

According to 2020 Chinese census, China has 1,430,695 immigrants, dividing between 845,697 foreign nationals and 584,998 residents of Hong Kong, Macao and Taiwan. As of 2023, there are around 12,000 foreigners with permanent residency in China.

== Legal immigration and permanent residency ==
In 2016, China issued 1,576 permanent residency cards. This was more than double what it had issued the previous year, but still roughly 750 times lower than the United States' 1.2 million at the time. By 2017, the number of foreigners holding Chinese Permanent Residence passed the 10,000 mark. More recent concrete numbers are not easily available; however, since 2019, China has also been revamping the process for foreigners to apply for the "Chinese Green Card".

In 2023, China launched the Five-Star Card, the new version of the Foreign Permanent Resident ID Card of the PRC.

=== Application Requirements ===
According to the Management Measures for the Permanent Residence Approval of Foreigners in China approved by the State Council of China, foreigners applying for permanent residence in China shall abide by Chinese laws, be in good health, have no criminal record, and meet one of the following conditions:

1. Have made direct investments in China, with a stable investment situation for three consecutive years and a good tax record.
2. Hold positions such as vice general manager, deputy factory director, or higher, or possess the title of associate professor, associate researcher, or higher, enjoying equivalent benefits. Have served continuously for at least four years, resided in China for a cumulative period of no less than three years within the past four years, and maintained a good tax record.
3. Have made significant and outstanding contributions to China or are urgently needed by the country.
4. Spouses and unmarried children under 18 of the individuals referred to in the first, second, and third items.
5. Spouses of Chinese citizens or foreigners who have obtained permanent residence qualifications in China, with a marriage lasting for five years, continuous residence in China for five years, residing in China for no less than nine months each year, and having stable living conditions and a residence.
6. Unmarried children under 18 who are dependent on their parents.
7. Have no direct relatives abroad, depend on immediate relatives in China, and are over 60 years old, have continuously resided in China for five years, reside in China for no less than nine months each year, and have stable living conditions and a residence.

The time limits referred to in this article all refer to the continuous period before the application date.

=== Hainan Free Trade Zone Immigration Preferential Policies ===
In July 2019, the Chinese Ministry of Public Security and National Immigration Administration announced updated preferential policies that applied to the Hainan Province (Hainan Free Trade Zone), including:

==== Facilitate Employment and Entrepreneurship for Foreign University Students ====
Foreign students who have obtained a master's or higher degree from Chinese universities can apply for a residency permit of up to 2 years for innovation and entrepreneurship in Hainan with the recommendation of their affiliated universities. Foreign students studying at overseas universities are allowed to engage in regular internships at Hainan's star-rated hotels, hospitals, international schools, and other entities. With the required invitation letter from the relevant entity and proof of enrollment at a foreign university, they can apply for the necessary visas for their internships.

==== Provide Permanent Residency Convenience for Foreigners Working or Investing ====
Chinese of foreign nationalities with a Ph.D. degree working in Hainan, or Chinese of foreign nationalities who have worked continuously in Hainan for at least 4 years with an accumulated residency of no less than 6 months each year, are eligible to apply for permanent residency. Their foreign spouses and minor children can also apply for permanent residency together. Foreign individuals who invest in innovative enterprises in Hainan and maintain stable investments with good tax records for three consecutive years, recommended by the Hainan Provincial People's Government, can apply for permanent residency. Foreign individuals who have worked continuously in Hainan for 4 years and meet the income and personal income tax payment standards in Hainan are eligible to apply for permanent residency.

=== Return of Overseas Chinese ===
The most significant immigration to China has been by the Overseas Chinese, who in the years since 1949 have been offered various enticements to return to their homeland. Several million may have done so since 1949. The largest influx came in 1978–79, when about 160,000 to 250,000 ethnic Chinese refugees fled Vietnam for southern China, as relations between the two countries worsened. The Washington Post reported that as of June 1978, more than 133,000 Chinese had fled into southern China. Many of these refugees were settled in state farms on Hainan Island.

== Illegal immigration ==
=== North Koreans ===
Illegal immigrants from North Korea have moved across the China–North Korea border to seek higher wages and escape repression.

Approximately 1,850 North Koreans fled their country in 2004. However, China views them as illegal economic migrants rather than refugees; China sends many of them back. This is also due to pressure from North Korea under a 1986 protocol China made with North Korea (the "Mutual Cooperation Protocol for the Work of Maintaining National Security and Social Order and the Border Areas"). Many of those who succeed in reaching sanctuary in foreign diplomatic compounds or international schools have been allowed by China to depart for South Korea.

== African migrants ==
There is a sizeable community of black Africans primarily concentrated in Guangzhou, China. Since the country's late 1990s economic boom following the reform and opening up, thousands of African traders and businesspeople, predominantly from West Africa, migrated to the city of Guangzhou, creating an "Africatown" in the middle of the southern Chinese metropolis of approximately 10 km^{2}. The primarily male population often set up local businesses and also engage in international trade as well.

According to official statistics of the PRC government, the number of Africans in Guangzhou has increased by 30-40% each year, and now form the largest black community in Asia. However, as many have overstayed their visas, official figures may be understated. Estimates vary on the number of Africans living in Guangzhou: from 20,000 to over 200,000. This has led to controversies and anger by the local community due to rumors of increasing numbers of crimes, including rape, fraud, robberies, and drug dealing committed by Africans. Huang Shiding of the Guangzhou Institute of Social Sciences estimates the number of permanent residents of foreign nationality (six months and above) to be around 50,000, of which some 20,000 are of African origin.

By 2020, there was an estimated 500,000 Africans residing in China, with around 100,000 in Guangzhou.

== Refugees ==
At the end of 2015, China held 301,622 refugees. Most of those refugees were from Vietnam, and the rest were from Africa and Middle East.

== See also ==
- Chinese Foreign Permanent Resident ID Card
- Migration in China
- Chinese emigration
