= Foreign Permanent Resident ID Card =

Chinese identity card

People's Republic of China Foreign Permanent Resident ID Card
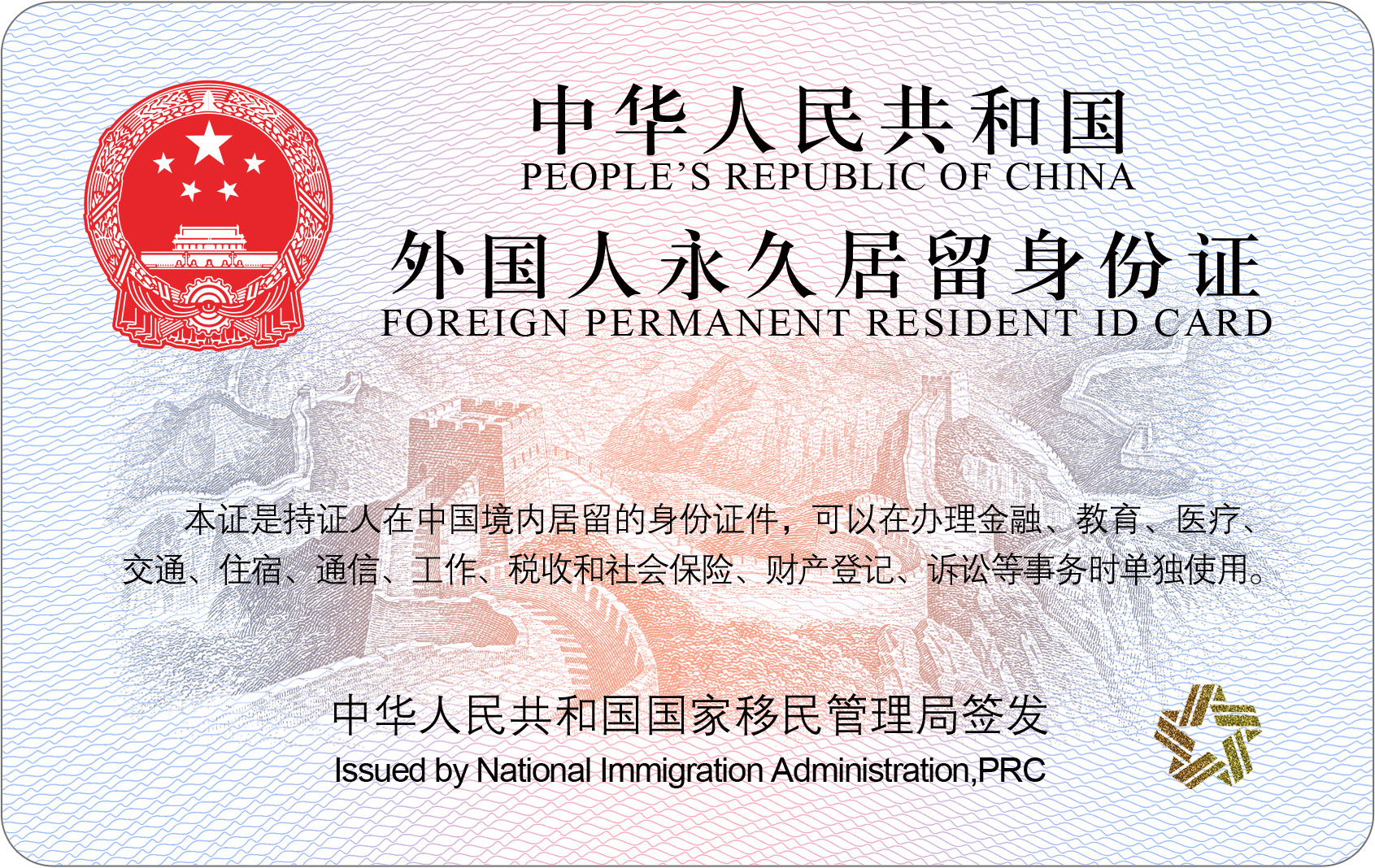
- Front

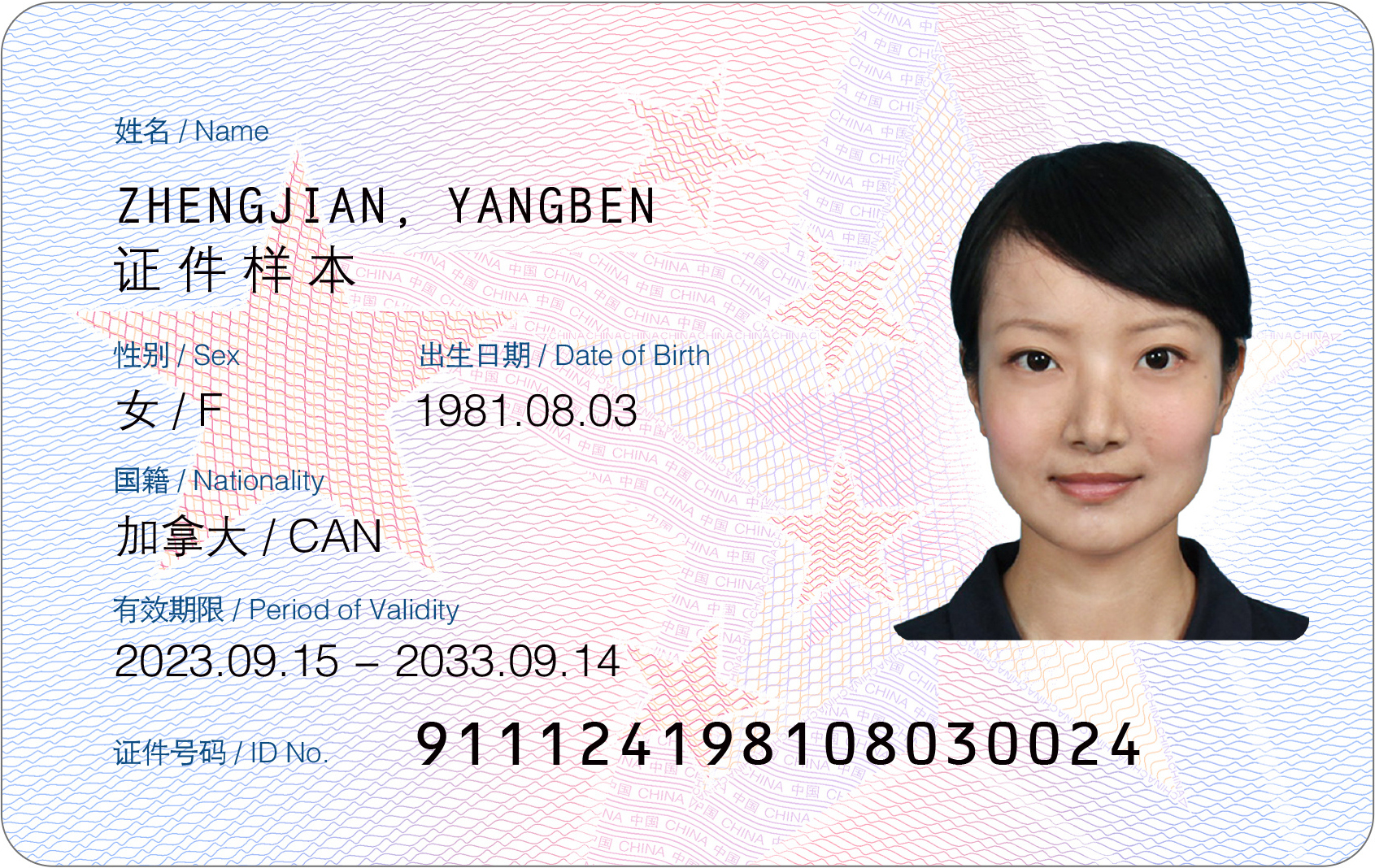
- Back
- Issued by: National Immigration Administration
- First issued: 05.12.2019
- Purpose: Identification
- Valid in: 05.12.2030
- Eligibility: Work Authorization
- Expiration: 10 years (18 years old and above) 5 years (under 18 years old)
- Cost: CN¥300 (for the first application and renewal upon expiration); CN¥600 (for replacement of a lost or damaged card)

Foreign Permanent Resident ID Card
- Simplified Chinese: 中华人民共和国外国人永久居留身份
- Traditional Chinese: 中華人民共和國外國人永久居留身份
Transcriptions
Standard Mandarin
- Hanyu Pinyin: Zhōnghuá rénmín gònghéguó wàiguó rén yǒngjiǔ jūliú shēnfèn zhèng
Yue: Cantonese
- Jyutping: zung1 waa4 jan4 man4 gung6 wo4 gwok3 ngoi6 gwok3 jan4 wing5 gau2 geoi1 lau4 san1 fan6

The People's Republic of China Foreign Permanent Resident ID Card (Chinese: 中华人民共和国外国人永久居留身份证; pinyin: Zhōnghuá rénmín gònghéguó wàiguó rén yǒngjiǔ jūliú shēnfèn zhèng; lit. 'Permanent Residence Identity Card of the People's Republic of China for Foreigners'), colloquially referred to as the PR Card (PR卡; PR kǎ), Green Card (绿卡; Lǜkǎ) or Five-Star Card (五星卡; Wǔxīng kǎ) by expats, is an identity document for permanent residents in China.

== History ==
In August 2004, the Ministry of Public Security and the Ministry of Foreign Affairs of the People's Republic of China issued Order No. 74 to implement "Administrative Measures for the Approval of Foreigners' Permanent Residence in China", which stipulate the qualifications, application materials, approval procedures, approval authority, and disqualification of foreigners for permanent residence in China.

On September 30, 2014, Chinese Premier Li Keqiang stated that it would be easier for foreigners to get green cards in China in the future, making it more convenient for foreigners to teach and carry out research in China and invest in business.

In 2016, China implemented a series of policy measures, including offering green cards to foreign-national Chinese with a doctoral degree or above who worked in Zhongguancun enterprises for four consecutive years, with accumulated actual residence of not less than 6 months. Similarly, the "New Ten" entry-exit policy for the construction of Shanghai Science and Technology Innovation Center, offered permanent residency to highly-qualified foreigners and foreign investors.

In 2017, the Ministry of Public Security modified permanent residence permit cards, including renaming and redesigning the card to align with the second-generation resident ID card, including a chip for storing management information compatible with existing ID card readers.

In February 2020, in the early stages of the COVID-19 pandemic, the Ministry of Justice publicly solicited opinions on the Regulations on the Administration of Permanent Residence of Foreigners. After the public opinion draft of this regulation was published, it immediately aroused opposition from the public.

On August 11, 2022, the National Immigration Administration reiterated that overseas Chinese with a doctorate degree can apply for permanent residence in China after submitting relevant materials.

On December 1, 2023, the new version of the Foreign Permanent Resident ID Card began to be issued. On the first day, a total of 50 qualified foreigners received the first batch of cards.

== Sample ==
=== 2023 version ===
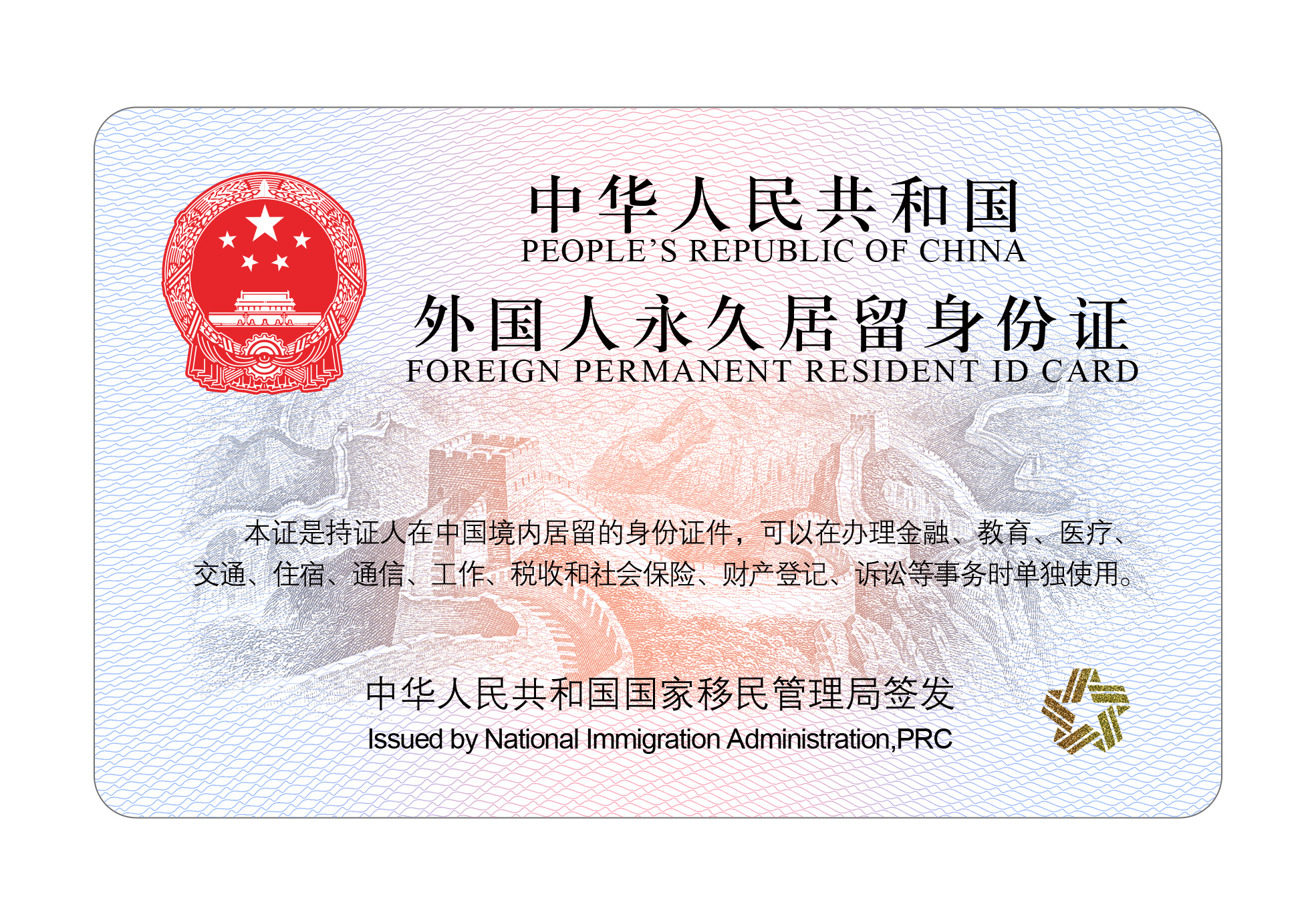
Front

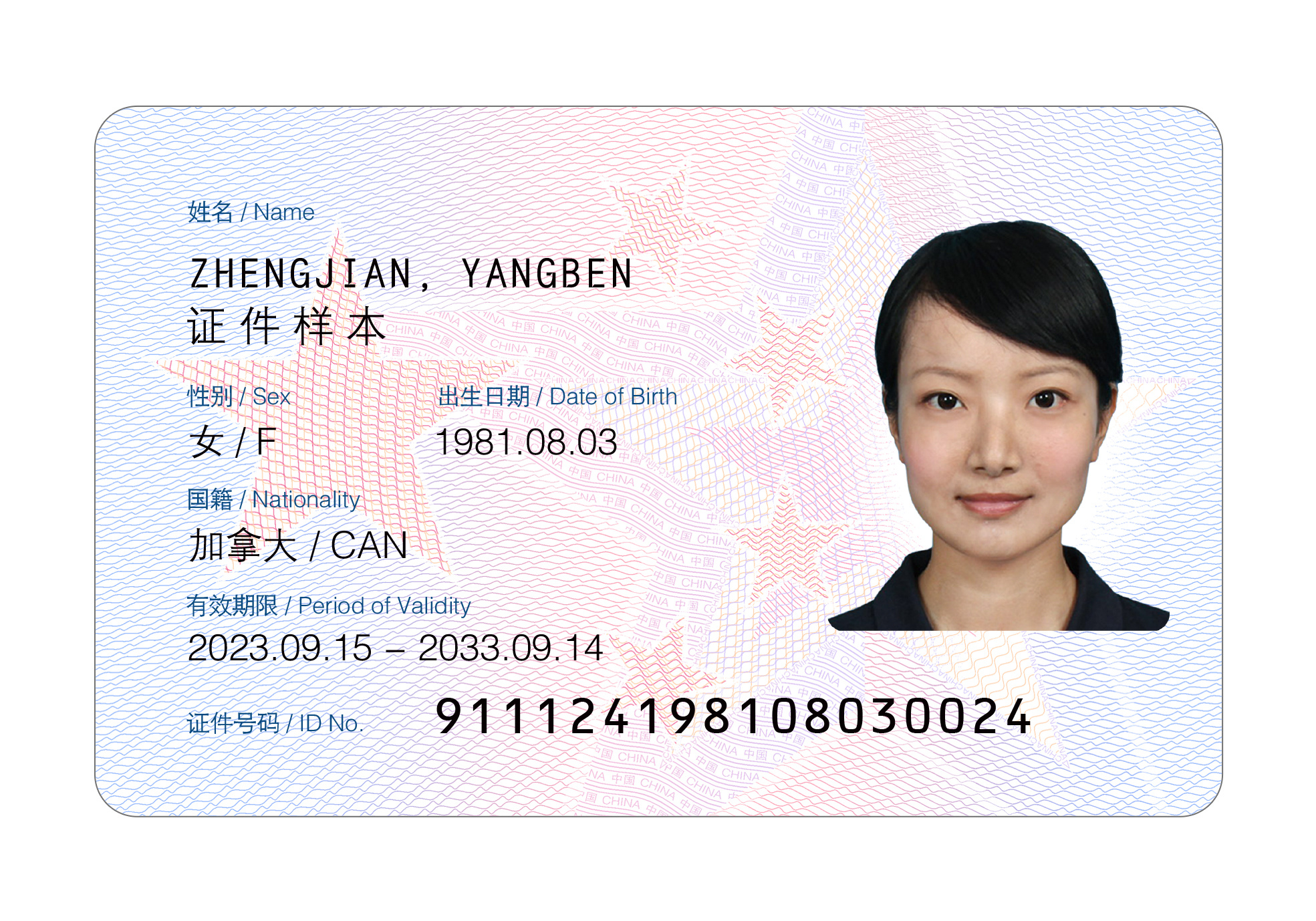
Back

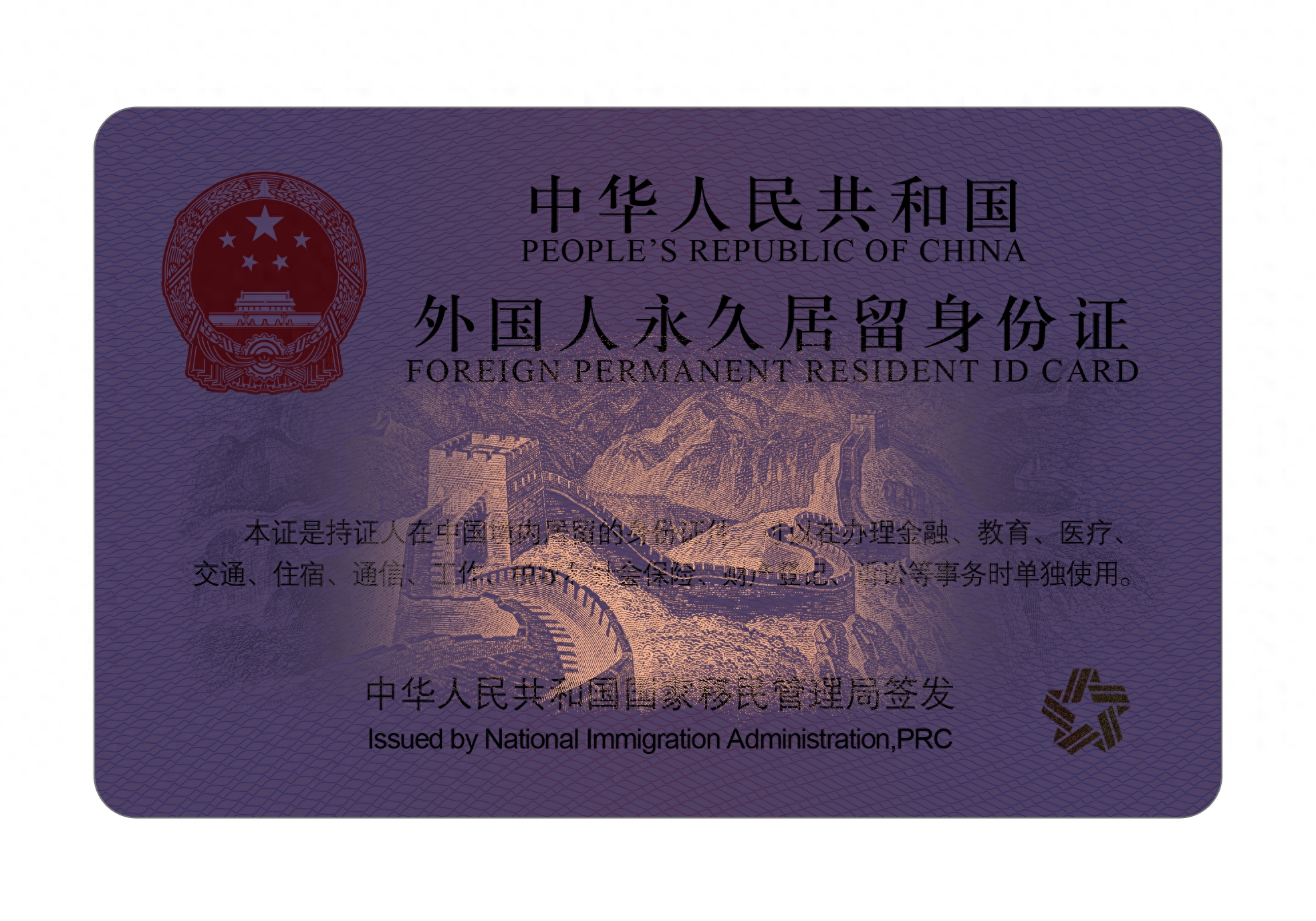
Front under UV light

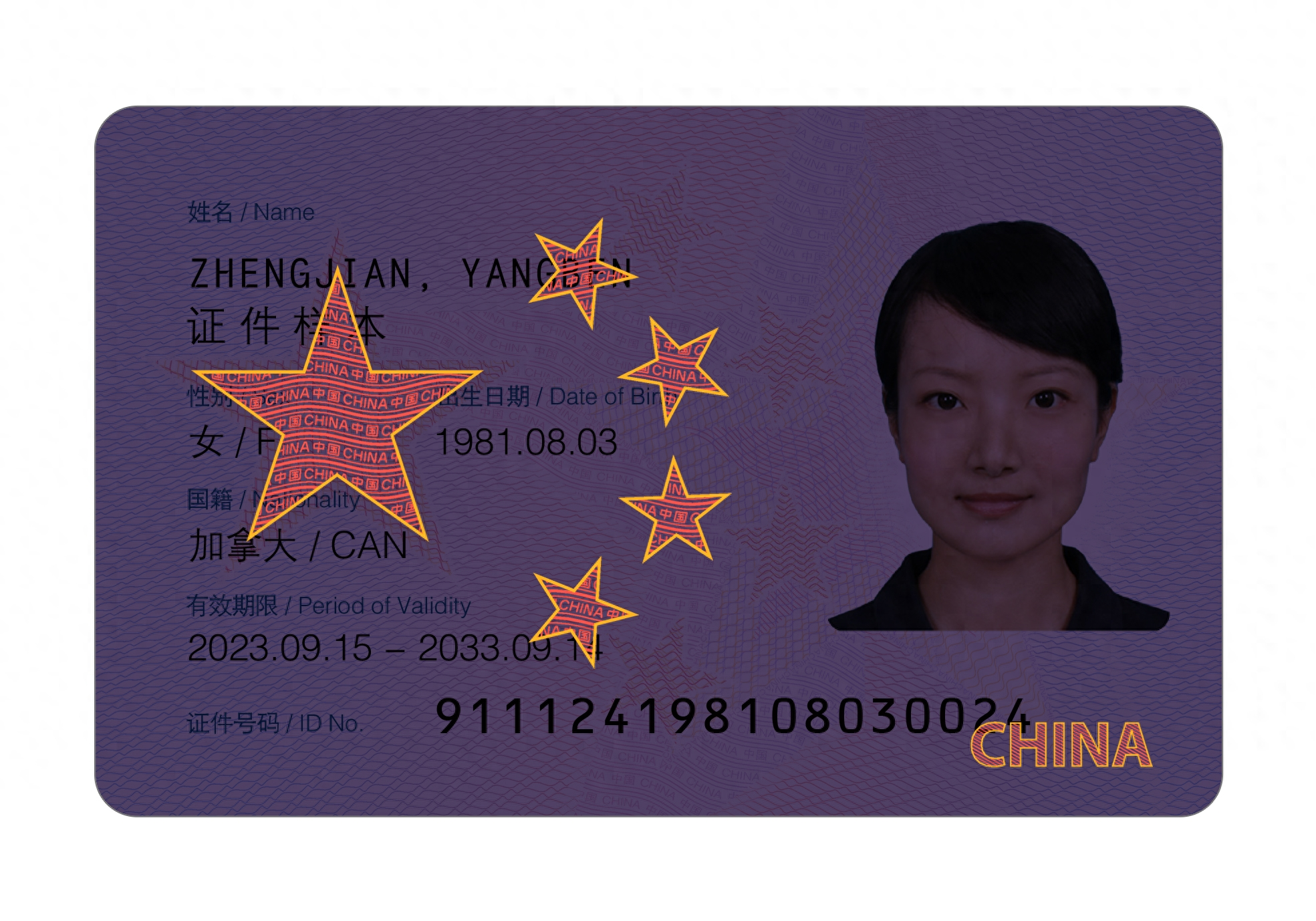
Back under UV light

- Name: Name of holder
- Gender/Sex: "Male/M" or "Female/F"
- Date of Birth: YYYY.MM.DD
- Nationality/Nationality: Chinese name of the holder's nationality/ nationality code
- Validity Period/Period of Validity: 20YY.MM.DD-20YY.MM.DD
- 18-digit ID number/ID No. (2023 new coding rule)

=== 2017 version ===
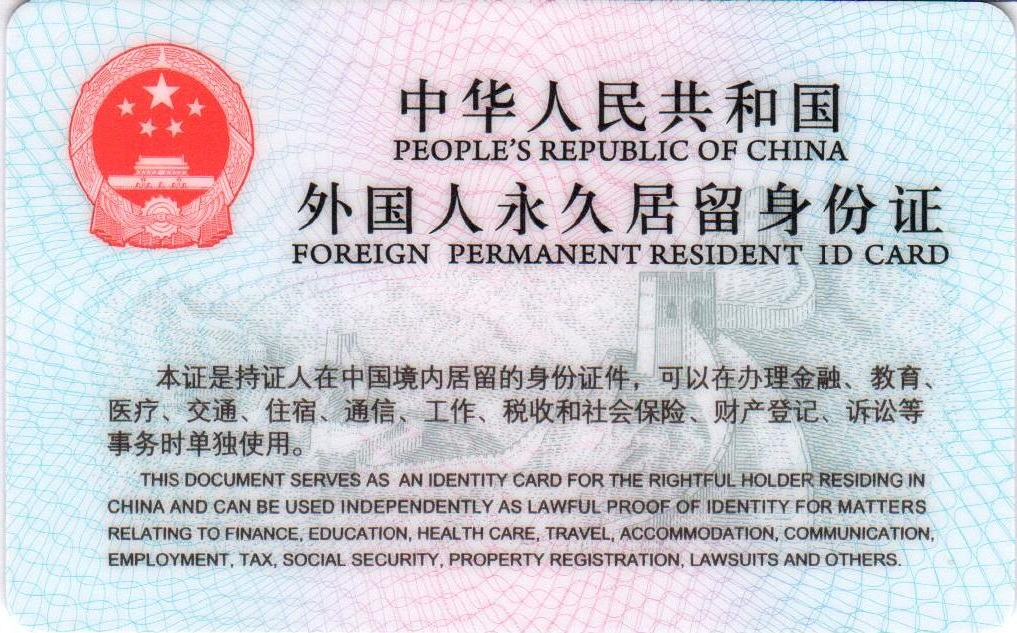
Back view

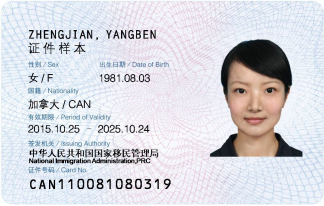
Front view

- Name: Name of holder
- Gender/Sex: "Male/M" or "Female/F"
- Date of Birth: YYYY.MM.DD
- Nationality/Nationality: Chinese name of the holder's nationality/ nationality code
- Validity Period/Period of Validity: 20YY.MM.DD-20YY.MM.DD
- Issuing Authority: National Immigration Administration, PRC (formerly Ministry of Public Security)
- 15-digit ID number/Card No. (follows the 2004 coding rule)

=== 2004 version ===
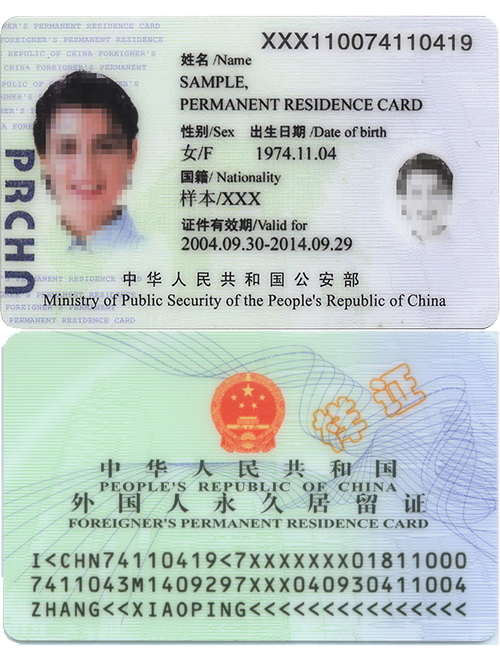
- Name: Name of holder
- Gender/Sex: "Male/M" or "Female/F"
- Date of Birth: YYYY.MM.DD
- Nationality/Nationality: Chinese name of the holder's nationality/ nationality code
- Validity Period/Period of Validity: 20YY.MM.DD-20YY.MM.DD

The 15-digit ID number is printed in the top right-hand corner, and the issuing authority (Ministry of Public Security of the People's Republic of China) is printed at the bottom of the card.

== Coding rule ==
=== 2023 coding rule ===
The combination of the 18-digit ID number is as follows:

Foreigner	Administrative division codes		Nationality			Date of birth								Sequence			Check digit
9	1	1	1	2	4	Y	Y	Y	Y	M	M	D	D	8	8	8	X

Its format is similar to resident ID card numbers, sharing the same length and checksum system, but the meaning of different digit positions changes.

=== 2004 & 2017 coding rule ===
The combination of the 15-digit ID number is as follows:

Nationality			Code of first acceptance authority				Date of birth						Sequence	Check digit
C	A	N	1	1	0	0	Y	Y	M	M	D	D	8	X

== Validity period ==
Regarding the issuance of the "Permanent Residence Permit for Foreigners of the People's Republic of China", Article 19 of the "Measures" stipulates: "Foreigners who are approved for permanent residence in China, the Ministry of Public Security shall issue a "Permanent Residence Permit for Foreigners"; Overseas, the Ministry of Public Security will issue the "Confirmation Form of Permanent Residence Status for Foreigners", and the applicant will go to the Chinese embassy or consulate abroad to apply for a residence visa (D visa) with the "Confirmation Form of Permanent Residence Status of Foreigners", 30 days after entry They can obtain the "Permanent Residence Permit for Foreigners" from the public security organ that accepts their application within the country."

Article 20 of the "Measures" stipulates: "Foreigners who have been approved for permanent residence in China shall stay in China for not less than three months in total each year. Approved by the public security department or bureau of the province, autonomous region or municipality directly under the Central Government where the long-term residency resides, but the cumulative stay in China within five years shall not be less than one year."

According to a report in 2004, "foreigners come to China for short-term residence, long-term residence and permanent residence." In 2003, there were 230,000 foreigners living in China for a long time. The newly launched "Permanent Residence Permit for Foreigners of the People's Republic of China" is an important reform of the People's Republic of China on the entry and residence of foreigners since 1949.

== Use ==
The foreign permanent resident ID card is a legal identification document for individuals residing in China, and it can be used independently when proving personal identity in various affairs such as financial transactions, education, healthcare, transportation, accommodation, communication, employment, taxation, social insurance, property registration, litigation, etc.

According to the National Immigration Administration, the conveniences of holding the permanent residence ID card mainly include the following aspects:

1. The cardholder can enter and exit the Chinese border multiple times with the foreign permanent resident ID card and a valid passport, without the need for additional visa procedures.
2. When using various transportation means such as airplanes, trains, and ships within the country, the cardholder can purchase tickets and travel by presenting the foreign permanent resident ID card.
3. When staying in domestic hotels, the cardholder can handle relevant check-in procedures by presenting the foreign permanent resident ID card.
4. When dealing with financial transactions such as banking, insurance, securities, and futures, as well as communication, taxation, property registration, litigation, and other social affairs, the foreign permanent resident ID card can serve as a legitimate identity document.
5. With the comprehensive implementation of offline applications, major internet platforms, application software, and public/government service apps such as the "National Government Service Platform," "Railway 12306," "Traffic Management 12123," and "Personal Income Tax" have recognized and accepted the foreign permanent resident ID card as a valid identification document.

== Application Requirements ==
According to the Management Measures for the Permanent Residence Approval of Foreigners in China approved by the State Council of China, foreigners applying for permanent residence in China shall abide by Chinese laws, be in good health, have no criminal record, and meet one of the following conditions:

1. Have made direct investments in China, with a stable investment situation for three consecutive years and a good tax record.
2. Hold positions such as vice general manager, deputy factory director, or higher, or possess the title of associate professor, associate researcher, or higher, enjoying equivalent benefits. Have served continuously for at least four years, resided in China for a cumulative period of no less than three years within the past four years, and maintained a good tax record.
3. Have made significant and outstanding contributions to China or are urgently needed by the country.
4. Spouses and unmarried children under 18 of the individuals referred to in the first, second, and third items.
5. Spouses of Chinese citizens or foreigners who have obtained permanent residence qualifications in China, with a marriage lasting for five years, continuous residence in China for five years, residing in China for no less than nine months each year, and having stable living conditions and a residence.
6. Unmarried children under 18 who are dependent on their parents.
7. Have no direct relatives abroad, depend on immediate relatives in China, and are over 60 years old, have continuously resided in China for five years, reside in China for no less than nine months each year, and have stable living conditions and a residence.

The time limits referred to in this article all refer to the continuous period before the application date.

== See also ==
- Blue Card (European Union)
- Green card
- Immigration to China
