= National Immigration Administration =

Immigration authority of People's Republic of China

National Immigration Administration 国家移民管理局
- Ministry of Public Security Patch

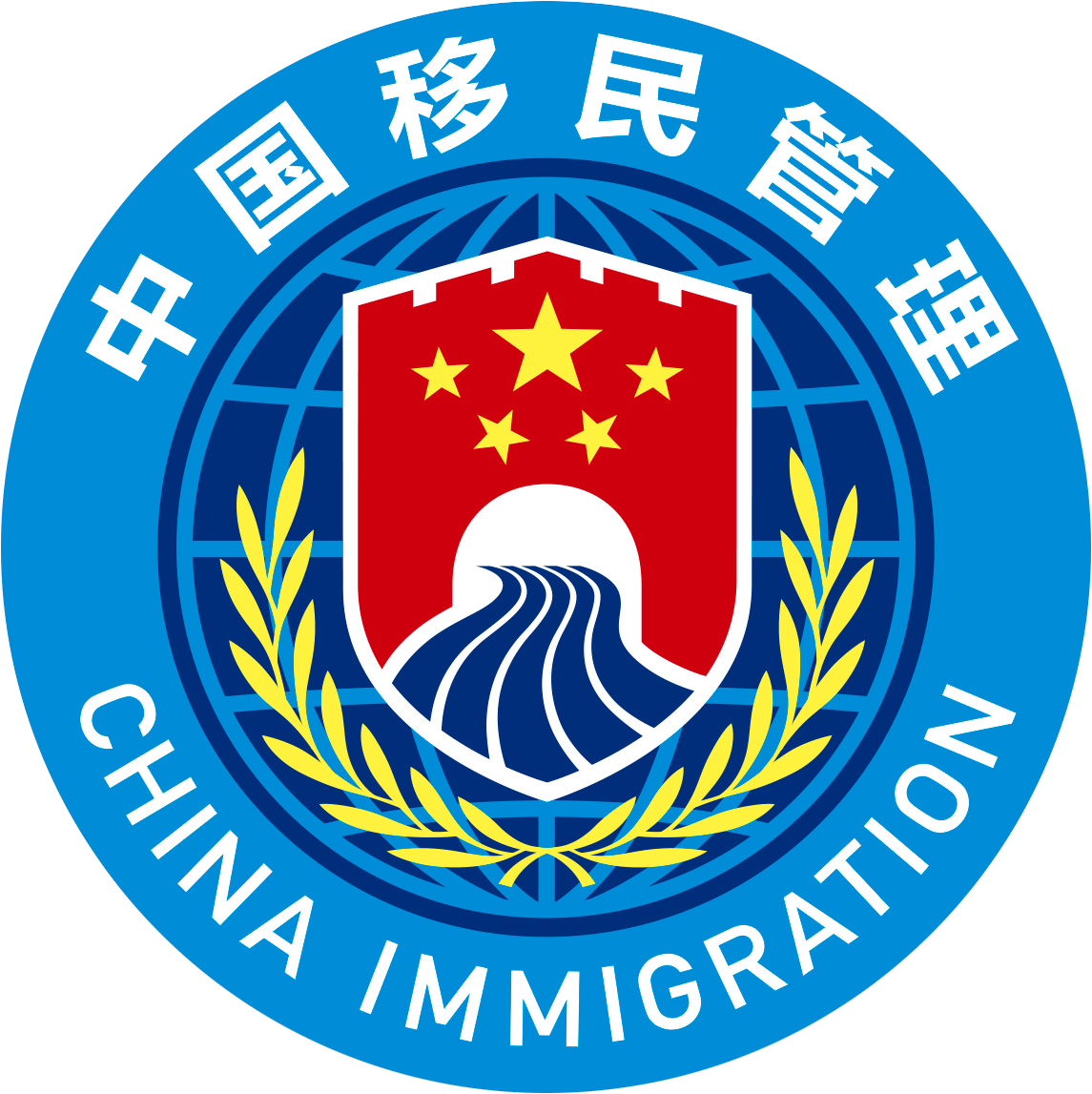
- Logo of the NIA

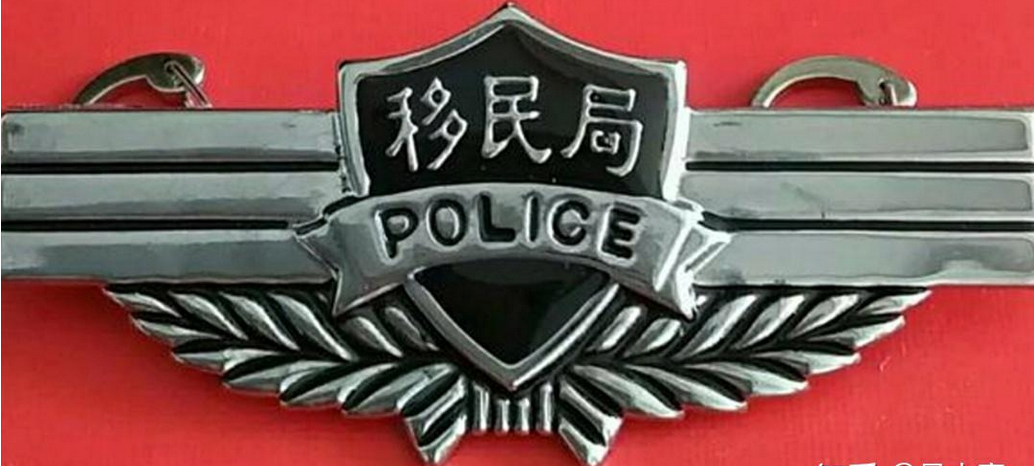
- Emblem

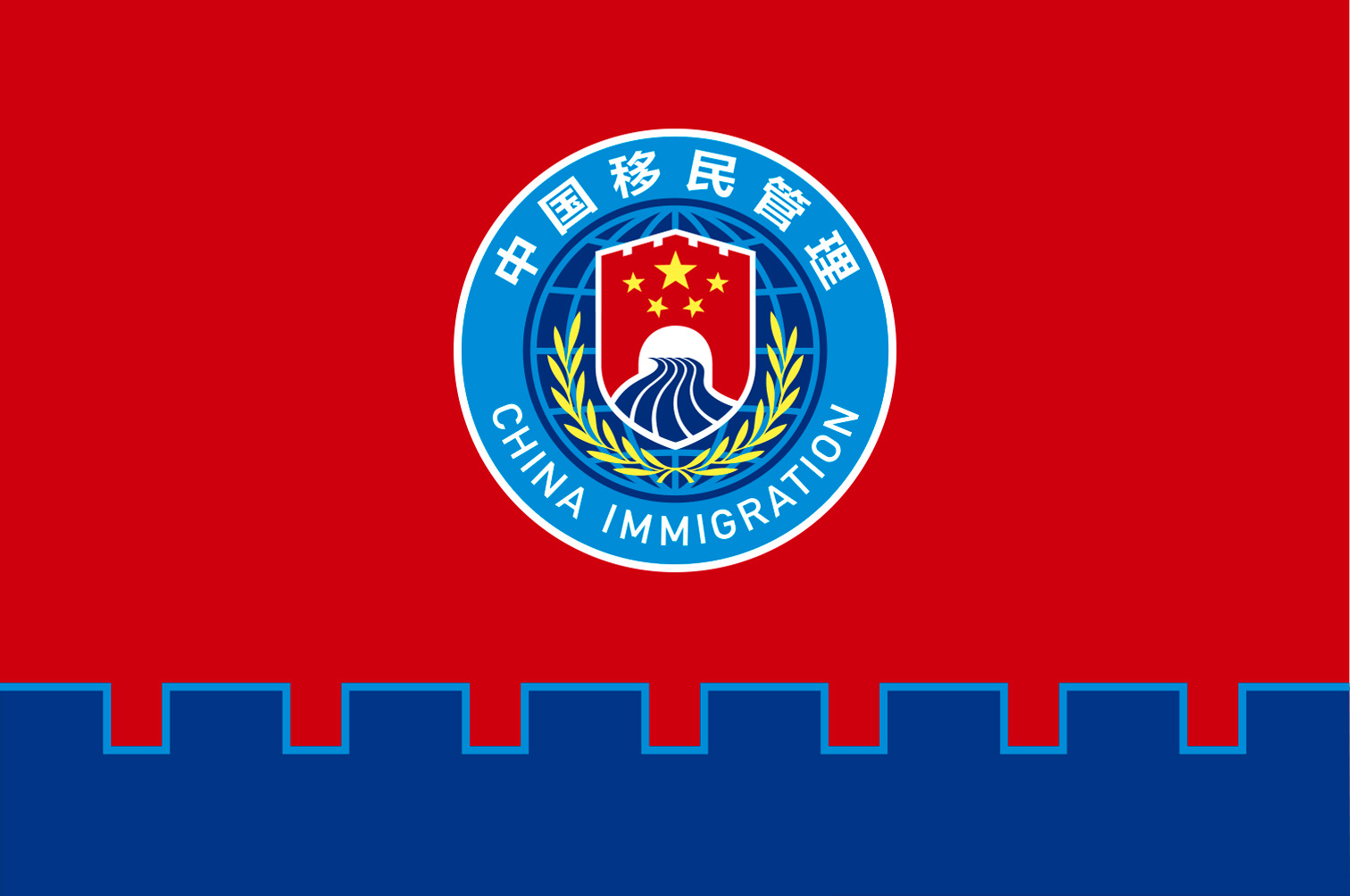
- Flag
- Abbreviation: NIA

Agency overview
- Formed: April 2, 2018
- Annual budget: 62.5 Billion RMB (2025)

Jurisdictional structure
- National agency: China
- Operations jurisdiction: China
- Governing body: Ministry of Public Security
- General nature: Civilian police
- Specialist jurisdictions: Immigration; National border patrol, security, integrity

Facilities
- Vehicles: 11782

Website
- https://en.nia.gov.cn/

National Immigration Administration
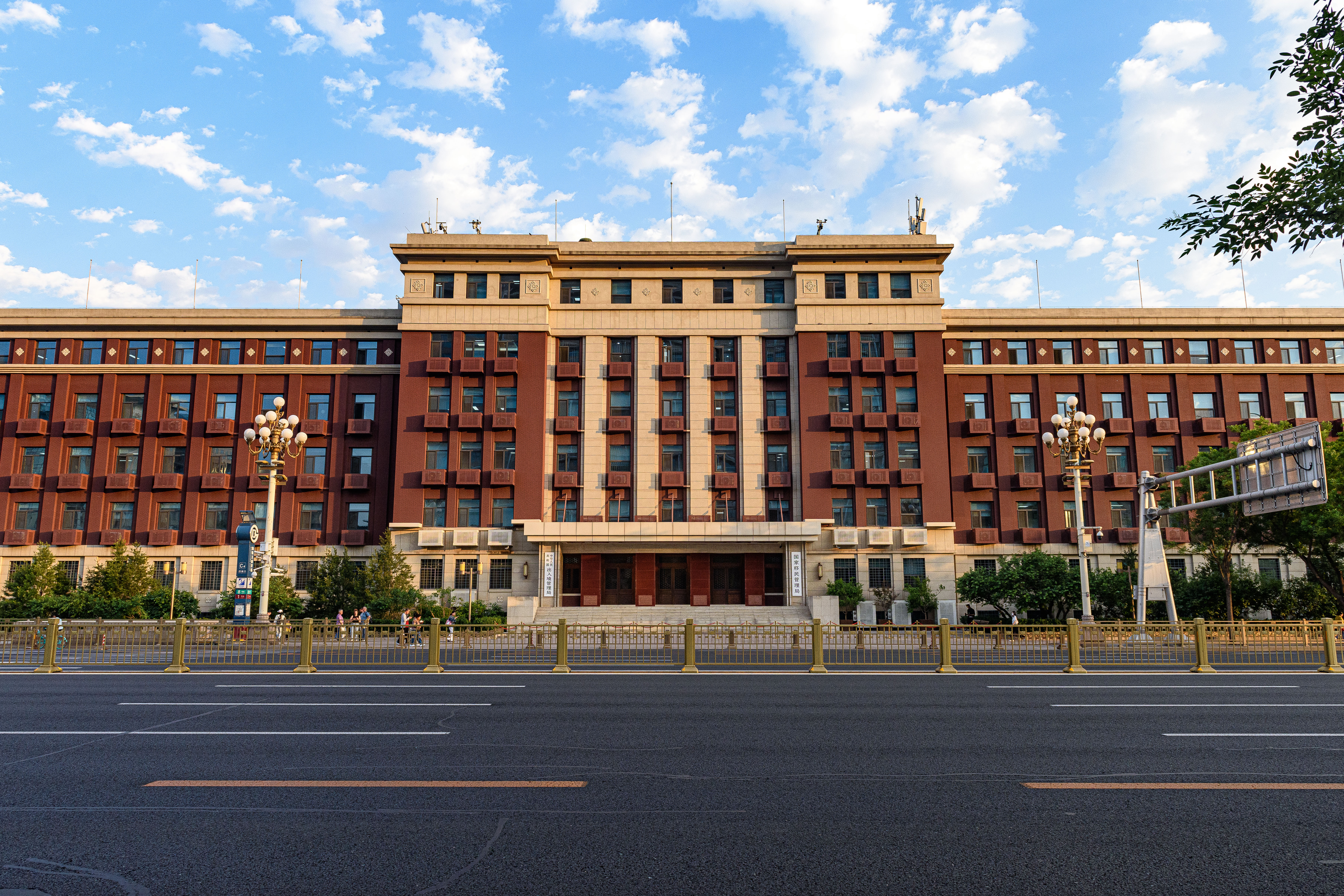
- Simplified Chinese: 国家移民管理局
Transcriptions
Standard Mandarin
- Hanyu Pinyin: Guójiā Yímín Guǎnlǐ Jú

The National Immigration Administration (NIA), alternatively known as the Exit and Entry Administration of the People's Republic of China (for mainland China's regional border controls with Hong Kong, Macau, and Taiwan), is a sub-ministry-level executive agency administrated by the Ministry of Public Security. The administration is responsible for coordinating and formulating immigration policies and their implementation, border control (and border patrol along with drug interdiction), administering foreigners' stay, management on refugees and nationality, taking the lead in coordinating the administering of foreigners who illegally enter, stay or are employed in China, and the repatriation of illegal immigrants. The NIA is also responsible for manning border checkpoints.

In 2025, the NIA had an annual budget of 62,567,100,300 Renminbi.

== History ==
In July 1998, nine cities including Beijing, Tianjin, Shanghai, Guangzhou, Shenzhen, Zhuhai, Xiamen, Haikou, and Shantou established the entry-exit border checkpoints, which were vertically led by the Ministry of Public Security Exit and Entry Bureau. In 2011, according to the Central Office document on the "approval on the adjustment of Beijing in seven vocational institutions specifications preparing Frontier Guard Inspection Station" (Central Office Document No. 54), Shenzhen FGIS and seven other professional Frontier Inspection Station Specifications adjusted from the deputy department level to the main department level with the institutional affiliation and staffing remaining unchanged.

Prior to the 2018 People's Armed Police reform, the People's Armed Police Border Defense Corps (Chinese: 武警边防部队; pinyin: Wǔjǐng Biānfáng Bùdùi), more commonly known as the Ministry of Public Security Border Defense Corps (Chinese: 公安边防部队) due to it being a Ministry of Public Security Active Service Force, was formerly China's primary border patrol force overseen by the Ministry of Public Security Border Control Department.

After the 2018 people's armed police reforms, the Ministry of Public Security Exit and Entry Bureau and Ministry of Public Security Border Control Department (with the People's Armed Police Border Defense Corps) merged to form the national immigration administration on April 2, 2018, with the latter's personnel becoming part of the People's Police.

On April 1, 2021, with the approval of the Central Committee of the Chinese Communist Party, the National Immigration Management Agency will use its own flag and logo from April 2, 2021, onward.

== Organizational structure ==
The National Immigration Administration has an institution that Deputy Bureau level (副司局级), and each border inspection station and standing force are at Office level (正厅级). The National Immigration Service has the following subordinate bodies:

=== Internal organs ===
- Department of General Affairs (综合司) (Migration Issues International Cooperation Office—移民事务国际合作司）
- Department of Political and Legal Affairs (政策法规司)
- Department of Foreigner Management (外国人管理司)
- Department of Citizen Exit-Entry Management (公民出入境管理司)
- Department of Border Security Check (边防检查管理司)
- Department of Information Technology (信息科技司)
- Department of Cadres and Personnel (干部人事司)
- Logistics Support Division (后勤保障司)
- Unit Party Committee (机关党委)

=== Affiliated units ===
- Immigration Management Information Technology Research Institute (出入境管理信息技术研究所)
- Immigration Services Center (移民事务服务中心)
- Policing Security Center (警务保障中心)

=== Directly subordinate units ===
==== Immigration Inspection General Stations ====
The Inner Mongolia, Liaoning, Jilin, Heilongjiang, Guangxi, Yunnan, Tibet, Gansu and Xinjiang General Station of exit and entry frontier inspection also have the name of the Provincial Public Security Department's Border Management Unit under One institution with two names.

- Beijing General Station of Exit and Entry Frontier inspection (北京出入境边防检查总站)
- Tianjin General Station of Exit and Entry Frontier inspection (天津出入境边防检查总站)
- Shanghai General Station of Immigration Inspection (上海出入境边防检查总站)
- Guangzhou General Station of Exit and Entry Frontier Inspection (广州出入境边防检查总站)
- Shenzhen General Station of Exit and Entry Frontier inspection (深圳出入境边防检查总站)
- Zhuhai General Station of Immigration Inspection (珠海出入境边防检查总站)
- Xiamen Entry and Exit Border Inspection Station (厦门出入境边防检查总站)
- Haikou General Station of Exit and Entry Frontier Inspection (海口出入境边防检查总站)
- Chongqing General Station of Exit and Entry Frontier Inspection (重庆出入境边防检查总站)
- Hebei General Station of Exit and Entry Frontier Inspection (河北出入境边防检查总站)
- Shanxi General Station of Exit and Entry Frontier Inspection(山西出入境边防检查总站)
- Jilin General Station of Exit and Entry Frontier Inspection (吉林出入境边防检查总站)
- Liaoning General Station of Exit and Entry Frontier Inspection| (辽宁出入境边防检查总站)
- Heilongjiang General Station of Exit and Entry Frontier Inspection (黑龙江出入境边防检查总站)
- Shaanxi General Station of Exit and Entry Frontier Inspection (陕西出入境边防检查总站)
- Gansu General Station of Exit and Entry Frontier Inspection (甘肃出入境边防检查总站)
- Qinghai General Station of Exit and Entry Frontier Inspection (青海出入境边防检查总站)
- Shandong General Station of Exit and Entry Frontier Inspection (山东出入境边防检查总站)
- Zhejiang General Station of Exit and Entry Frontier Inspection (浙江入境边防检查总站)
- Henan General Station of Exit and Entry Frontier Inspection (河南出入境边防检查总站)
- Hubei General Station of Exit and Entry Frontier Inspection (湖北出入境边防检查总站)
- Hunan General Station of Exit and Entry Frontier Inspection (湖南出入境边防检查总站)
- Jiangxi General Station of Exit and Entry Frontier Inspection (江西出入境边防检查总站)
- Jiangsu General Station of Exit and Entry Frontier Inspection (江苏出入境边防检查总站)
- Anhui General Station of Exit and Entry Frontier Inspection (安徽出入境边防检查总站)
- Sichuan General Station of Exit and Entry Frontier Inspection (四川出入境边防检查总站)
- Guizhou General Station of Exit and Entry Frontier Inspection (贵州出入境边防检查总站)
- Yunnan General Station of Exit and Entry Frontier Inspection (云南出入境边防检查总站)
- Inner Mongolia General Station of Exit and Entry Frontier Inspection (内蒙古出入境边防检查总站)
- Xinjiang General Station of Exit and Entry Frontier Inspection (新疆出入境边防检查总站)
- Ningxia General Station of Exit and Entry Frontier Inspection (宁夏出入境边防检查总站)
- Guangxi General Station of Exit and Entry Frontier Inspection (广西出入境边防检查总站)
- Tibet General Station of Exit and Entry Frontier Inspection (西藏出入境边防检查总站)

=== Police tactical units ===
The Hulunbuir Border Management Detachment of the Inner Mongolia General Station of Exit and Entry Frontier Inspection operates the Barga Commando Unit (Chinese: 巴尔虎突击队; pinyin: Bā'ěr hǔ tújí duì), a police tactical unit used for border patrol, CQB anti-terrorism, anti-hijacking, apprehending dangerous suspects, search and rescue, bomb disposal and security at large events. It operates K9s, infantry mobility vehicles along with submachine guns and sniper rifles.

== Equipment ==
As of July 2024, the NIA operated 11782 vehicles. Police dogs are also used for drug interception and border patrol.

In 2023, 15 police dogs became the first batch of police dogs with the award of "Meritorious Police Dogs". Horses and drones are also used for border patrol operation.

=== Firearms ===
Name	Type	Origin	Reference
QSZ-92	Semi-automatic pistol	China	
QCQ-171	Submachine gun	China	
QBZ-95	Assault rifle	China	

== Reforms ==
From 1 April 2019 onwards, all mainland citizens can apply and receive passports and exit and entry permits from the NIA offices anywhere in the country, instead of requiring citizens to go to their Hukou city/province to apply. Also, exit and entry permits to Hong Kong, Macau and Taiwan can be applied to, received, and delivered within a few minutes on automatic machines.

== Line of duty casualties ==
Due to the NIA being responsible for border patrol, there are occasionally gunfights between NIA officers and drug traffickers on the China–Myanmar border, most famously on December 4, 2021, when ethnic Hani officer Cai Xiaodong (蔡晓东) of the Xishuangbanna border management detachment was shot and killed by a drug trafficker on the China Myanmar border. He was posthumously awarded martyr status.

In 2021, 7 NIA officers (both sworn and auxiliary) were killed in the line of duty, with a further 49 being injured

In 2022, 6 NIA officers (both sworn and auxiliary) were killed in the line of duty, with a further 40 being injured

In 2023, 12 NIA officers (both sworn and auxiliary) were killed in the line of duty, with a further 77 being injured.

In 2024, 15 NIA officers (both sworn and auxiliary) were killed in the line of duty, with a further 66 being injured.

== See also ==
- Ministry of Public Security (China)
- People's Police (China)
- Immigration to China
