= Africans in Guangzhou =

Africans who reside in Guangzhou

Total population
- 10,344 (official count, 2017) "almost to pre-pandemic levels" (2024)

Languages
- English, French, Igbo, Bambara and other African languages, Mandarin Chinese, Cantonese

Related ethnic groups
- African diaspora

Africans in Guangzhou are African immigrants and African Chinese residents of Guangzhou, China.

Beginning in the late 1990s economic boom, an influx of thousands of African traders and business people, predominantly from West Africa, arrived in Guangzhou and created an African community in the middle of the southern Chinese metropolis.

Since 2014, the city's African population has significantly declined due to strict immigration enforcement by Chinese authorities and economic pressures in home countries, including depreciation of the Nigerian naira and Angolan kwanza.

== Population ==
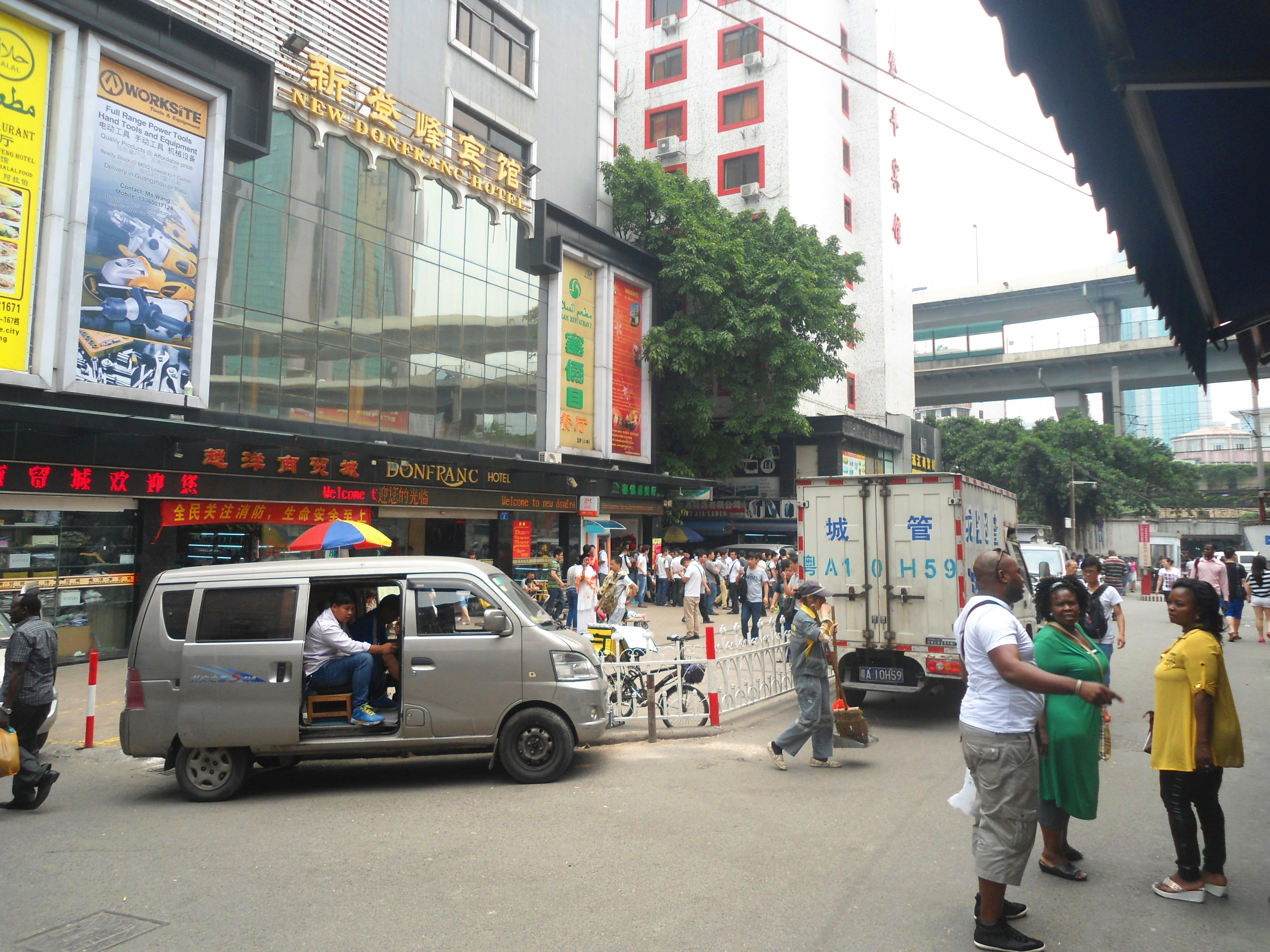
The southern end of Baohan Straight Street, Dengfeng Subdistrict, Yuexiu District, Guangzhou

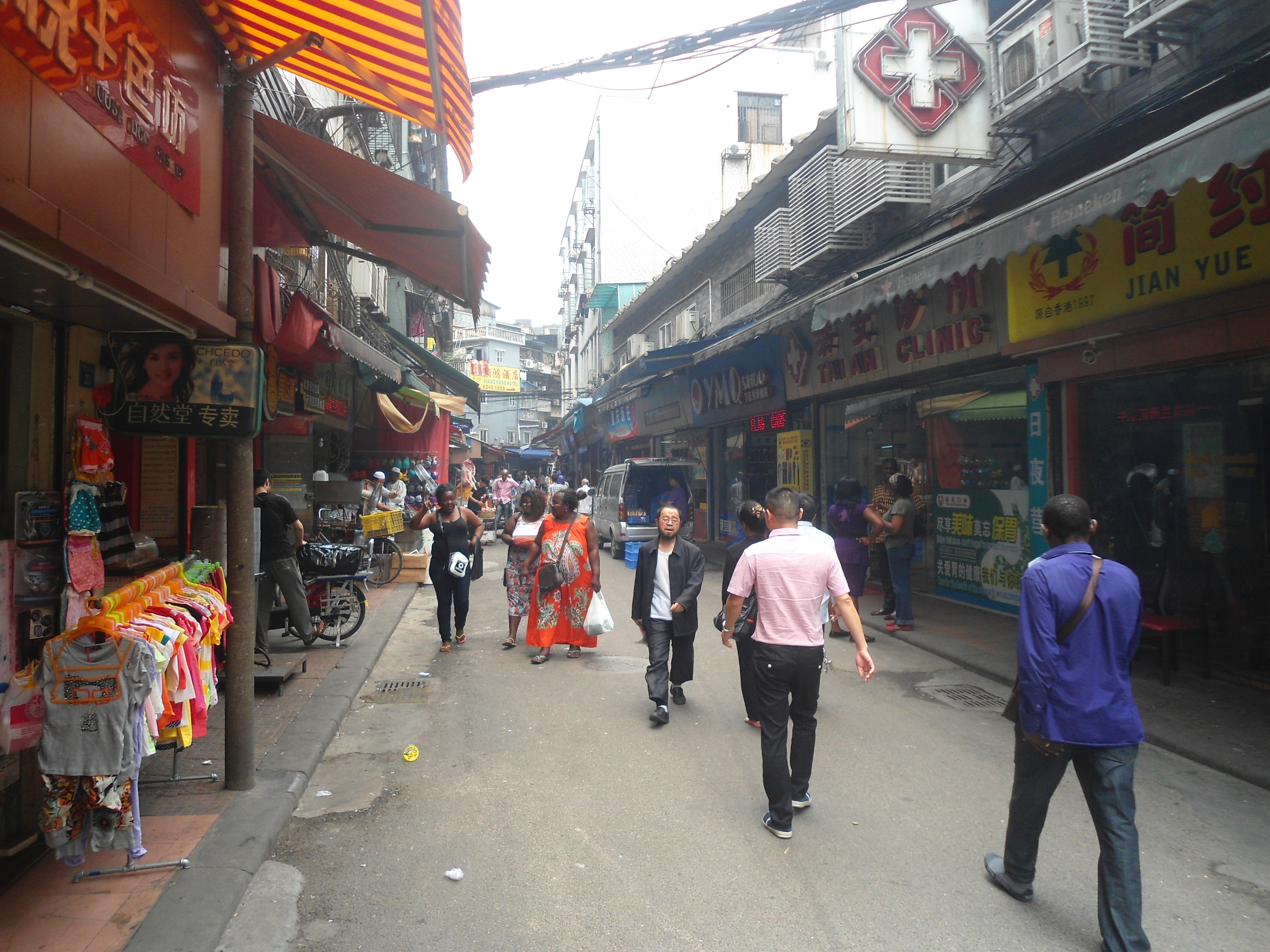
Some Africans seen in Guangzhou, 2014

Estimating the number of Africans in Guangzhou is difficult due to the highly mobile and transient nature of the community. Most arrivals are short-term visitors engaged in trade, which can lead to inflated perceptions of the resident population. For instance, official figures recorded 430,000 arrivals and departures by African nationals at city checkpoints in the first nine months of 2014—figures that include repeat entries and do not reflect long-term residency.

In response to public concern during the 2014 Ebola outbreak, Guangzhou authorities stated that approximately 16,000 Africans, including North Africans, were living in the city. Of these, only about 4,000 were considered long-term residents, defined as those staying over six months.

A 2020 report estimated that 500,000 Africans were living in China, with around 100,000 in Guangzhou alone. Scholar Adams Bodomo had earlier estimated over 500,000 Africans in China in 2012; however, his figure, based primarily on fieldwork, has been criticized as an overestimate due to the community's mobility.

Following 2014, population estimates began to decline. A 2014 article in This Is Africa cited stricter immigration enforcement and currency exchange issues as reasons for the decrease. In 2016, CNN reported that thousands of African migrants had left Guangzhou in the preceding 18 months. By early 2017, official data indicated that the number of African residents had dropped to 10,344. According to the Public Security Bureau of Guangzhou, the figure declined further to 4,553 by 2020. Researcher Roberto Castillo attributes this trend in part to the COVID-19 pandemic and stricter enforcement against overstayers.

By 2024, the African population in Guangzhou had reportedly rebounded to near pre-pandemic levels. This recovery is credited to the reopening of China's borders, renewed trade activity, and the easing of pandemic-era immigration controls.

Among African nationalities in Guangzhou, the largest groups are from Nigeria and Mali. Nigerians, mainly of the Igbo ethnicity, constitute the largest group overall, while Malians represent a significant portion of long-term residents. Other notable communities include migrants from the Democratic Republic of the Congo, Ghana, and Senegal, with a few hundred individuals from each country registered with civic groups as of 2014.

Overstaying visas has been a significant factor influencing population estimates. Many traders reported that the standard 30-day tourist visa was insufficient for conducting business, and the high cost of return flights made frequent travel impractical. Anthropologists Gordon Mathews, Linessa Dan Lin, and Yang Yang found that Nigerians—particularly Igbos—were especially likely to overstay, linking the practice to social expectations and notions of "masculine pride," as well as family pressure to demonstrate success.

== Neighborhoods ==
There are two main areas where Africans live and do business in Guangzhou: Xiaobei and Guangyuanxi, both areas in the centrally located Yuexiu District.

The area of Xiaobei is near Xiaobei station and home to several streets catering to African and Middle Eastern residents. Since the area was home to an existing Muslim population from Ningxia and Xinjiang, many African immigrants, around half of whom are Muslims, congregated around one area of town primarily because of the convenience in finding halal food. Owing to the neighborhood's history there are slightly more Muslim Africans than Christian Africans in Xiaobei. The nerve center of the area is Baohan Straight Street where there are African orientated shops and restaurants. The street was repaved in 2015 and many of the hawkers have departed or set up shops.

About 3 kilometres (2 mi) from Xiaobei and north of the Guangzhou railway station is Guangyuanxi, a more business orientated area with a major presence of Nigerian Igbo people. The area is filled with large trademarts selling shoes, clothing, and other goods. The trademarts are housed in large buildings called Tong Tong Trade Mart, Tian'en Clothing Market, Tangqi Building, Canaan Market, and Ying Fu Building. Since stricter immigration enforcement in the summer of 2013, this area has become much more dormant than before.

== History ==
=== 1990s and 2000s ===
Since China's economic boom in the 1990s, thousands of Africans migrated to China; most of these migrants were from West Africa. Many Africans left Indonesia and Thailand and went to Guangzhou after the 1997 Asian financial crisis, and the economic opportunity attracted more.

In Guangzhou, Africans are generally engaged in commerce, visiting or residing in the city because of its wholesale trading markets supplied by nearby factories. During the 2000s, the city's African population rapidly increased with a 2008 news report stating the number of African residents had increased by 30% to 40% annually.

Since 2004, illegal immigration enforcement has become an increasing focus for police authorities in Guangzhou and other parts of China. In 2003, campaigns against illegal immigration were conducted in Guangdong and elsewhere, and by 2008, police launched a series of "hurricane" campaigns targeting visa overstayers in the province. In Guangzhou, a local regulation adopted in 2004 encouraged residents to report suspected cases of illegal immigration, offering cash rewards of CN¥100 for confirmed tips.

=== Riots in 2009 and 2012 ===
Conflict between the African community and police in Guangzhou resulted in riots in 2009 and 2012. In July 2009, two Nigerian men jumped several floors from a building in an attempt to flee Chinese immigration authorities. Both men were hurt from the fall. But on hearing rumors of their deaths, hundreds of Africans, mostly Nigerian, surrounded a local police station. The demonstration escalated into a riot that shut down eight lanes of traffic on a major thoroughfare for several hours.

In June 2012, an African held in police custody after a taxi fare dispute died after "suddenly losing consciousness", according to police. Over a hundred Africans gathered at the police station in question demanding to know the cause of death. Guangzhou police responded with a statement that they would "investigate and settle this case strictly by law" and also that "All should abide by the law of China; no one should harm public interests or damage public order."

=== Stricter immigration enforcement ===
A large scale immigration enforcement sweep was conducted by local police in July and August 2013.

The system of immigration that had been in place since 2013 in Yuexiu District appeared to undergo change in summer 2018, with media reports that several low cost hotels and apartments in the area had prohibited African guests or singled out passport holders from Uganda and Nigeria, and shops and restaurants catering to Africans had been closed. The Uganda daily Daily Monitor spoke to Ugandans in Guangzhou who reported being advised to stay in more costly 4 or 5-star hotels, and other sources for the newspaper claimed the crackdown targeting Ugandans had followed an increasing number of Ugandan criminal suspects in China charged with drug trafficking, with the suspects allegedly being Nigerian citizens that obtained Ugandan passports through bribing "rogue" Ugandan immigration officials. A newspaper source described as a "senior government official" in Uganda blamed the Ministry of Internal Affairs for illegally selling Ugandan passports. A spokesperson for the Directorate of Citizenship and Immigration Control, under the Ministry of Internal Affairs, responded that the Ugandan passports were stolen or sold by Ugandan individuals.

=== COVID-19 pandemic ===
During the COVID-19 pandemic in mainland China, reports became widespread of Africans of Guangzhou being evicted from flats and hotels by landlords, and having difficulty in finding food and shelter as a result. Some became homeless and had to sleep on the street.

On 11 April, the United States Consulate General in Guangzhou warned African-Americans to avoid travel to the Guangzhou city, with a report by some African-Americans that "some businesses and hotels refuse to do business with them". The Consulate further raised a travel warning to announce the discrimination condition against African-Americans in Guangzhou on 13 April. In that warning, it said that Chinese officials might require Africans to participate in the COVID-19 test and undergo a 14-day supervised quarantine at their own expense.

Ambassadors in China from many African countries wrote to Foreign Minister of the People's Republic of China, Wang Yi, for asking China to resolve the discrimination problem against Africans in Guangzhou. The chair of African Union Commission, Moussa Faki Mahamat, also summoned Chinese Ambassador to the AU, Liu Yuxi, to express his extreme concern.

On 12 April, Zhao Lijian, the spokesperson of Ministry of Foreign Affairs of the People's Republic of China, said that:

During our fight against the coronavirus, the Chinese government has been attaching great importance to the life and health of foreign nationals in China. All foreigners are treated equally. We reject differential treatment, and we have zero tolerance for discrimination. Since the outbreak, the authorities in Guangdong attach high importance to the treatment of foreign patients, including African nationals. Specific plans and proper arrangements are made to protect their life and health to the best of our ability, thanks to which we were able to save the lives of some African patients in severe or critical conditions.

He also said in the regular press conference on 13 April that China will address the "African friends' concerns" by adopting a series of measures to avoid racist and discrimination problems, and condemned "the US had better focus on domestic efforts to contain the spread of the virus. Attempts to use the pandemic to drive a wedge between China and Africa are bound to fail".

=== Post pandemic ===
By 2024, trade activity in Guangzhou by African businessmen was pre-pandemic levels. In May 2025, public concern over immigration enforcement resurfaced when social media rumors claimed that over 3,000 police officers had raided Sanyuanli Subdistrict, a neighborhood with a large African community, in a mass crackdown on undocumented migrants. The Sanyuanli Subdistrict government denied the allegations, describing them as "false and baseless rumors" and clarified that the heightened police presence was related to urban redevelopment projects, not immigration enforcement. It also characterized the claim of "3,000 officers" as an exaggeration.

== Intermarriage ==
By 2014, there had been multiple marriages between African and Chinese people in Guangzhou, with almost all marriages being between African men and Chinese women. Chinese marriage visas do not legally allow the spouse to work. Many marriages have stability issues due to the difficulties in keeping visas. The majority of the Chinese who live and marry Africans in Guangzhou, for example, come from the rural poorer provinces Sichuan, Hunan, Hubei. From 2010 to 2014, rural Chinese who married Africans and foreigners were allowed to have multiple children, unlike average Chinese citizens.

== Trade and currency challenges ==
In addition to immigration enforcement, another difficulty to navigate for African traders has been the depreciation of several African currencies after the fall in oil prices since 2014. Nigerian traders who are a large part of the African contingent reported being stymied by the difficulty of obtaining foreign currency in Nigeria needed to purchase goods. The Nigerian government had initially reacted to the sharp depreciation in the Nigerian naira by limiting access to foreign exchange and refusing to devalue the official exchange rate. In order to obtain naira, Nigerian traders had to resort to the black market to buy dollars at a 75% premium, making it difficult to turn a profit. The foreign exchange problem proved so discouraging that one long time Nigerian clothing trader in Guangzhou interviewed by the Financial Times reported being unable to fill a single container halfway into the year in 2016. Difficulties were reported by traders with foreign exchange in other African countries including Angola, another top oil producer.

More recently, these challenges have intensified. Nigeria's ongoing currency instability and restrictions on official access to dollars have led traders to rely on informal naira–RMB networks and cryptocurrency to finance trade with China. Many traders say that bank-mediated transfers are no longer viable. According to one Igbo trader: "For us, it would be better to exchange naira directly with RMB; then 10,000,000 naira can buy one container. However, if I must exchange USD, I can only load half a container."

The naira's rapid depreciation (plummeting by more than 70% between 2022 and 2024) along with a low uptake of official currency swap programs, has left most Nigerian importers dependent on unofficial payment channels to settle trade with Chinese suppliers. Traders frequently cited delays, limited availability, and bureaucratic opacity at Central Bank of Nigeria forex windows. In some cases, traders' efforts to wire USD or RMB through the banking system were blocked, prompting them to turn to stablecoins like USDT, despite regulatory crackdowns.

== Crime ==
Crime involving African nationals in Guangzhou has been a subject of concern among both African and Chinese.

In August 2013, the Guangzhou Municipal Public Security Bureau carried out a major anti-drug operation involving 1,300 police officers who raided the Lihua (Dragon) Hotel in the city's Yuexiu District, a known center of activity for African migrants. The raid coincided with a broader immigration enforcement crackdown that summer and resulted in the arrest of 168 suspects, most of whom were described by police as citizens of Nigeria and Mali.

Following the raid, the Nigerian Ambassador to China at the time, Sola Onadipe, issued a highly critical public rebuke of his compatriots. In an interview with Vanguard, he lamented the scale of involvement by Nigerians in illegal activities in China. He added that some Nigerians in China smoked marijuana openly and drank heavily, calling such behavior "ridiculous" and expressing personal frustration at representing them diplomatically. The ambassador also drew a pointed contrast with other African nationals, stating that citizens of Ghana, Cameroon, and Côte d'Ivoire did not face the same level of scrutiny from Chinese police, suggesting that Nigerians' conduct may have invited disproportionate enforcement. This unusually harsh rhetoric from a sitting ambassador prompted scholarly commentary. Political scientist Steven F. Jackson interpreted the tirade as not just an expression of diplomatic frustration but possibly a reflection of deeper ethnic and class tensions within Nigeria. He noted that many Nigerians in Guangzhou are of Igbo origin from southeastern Nigeria, while Ambassador Onadipe is likely Yoruba, from the southwest. Jackson observed that "ambassadors are usually diplomatic and even-handed in their advocacy for their own citizens," but Onadipe's statements may have revealed latent divisions within the Nigerian state itself.

In 2017, a Nigerian consulate official in Guangzhou estimated that on average, 1% of Nigerians arriving in the city were arrested for drug-related offenses.

== See also ==
- Africans in Hong Kong
- Yiwu - Chinese city with large African and Middle East merchant population
