= List of Sayonara, Zetsubou-Sensei chapters =

The cover of the first volume of Sayonara, Zetsubou-Sensei as published by Kodansha on September 16, 2005, in Japan.

Chapters of the manga series Sayonara, Zetsubou-Sensei (さよなら 絶望先生, Sayonara Zetsubō Sensei) written by Kōji Kumeta were serialized in the Japanese manga magazine Weekly Shōnen Magazine, published by Kodansha, from 2005 to 2012 (except for chapter 259, guest-published in Shogakukan's Weekly Shōnen Sunday). It is a comedy about a teacher who takes all aspects of life, world and culture in the most negative light possible. It satirizes politics, media, and Japanese society. In 2007, the manga received the thirty-first Kodansha Manga Award in the shōnen category.

All 301 serialized chapters except chapter 268 were collected in thirty tankōbon volumes released in Japan. The series was licensed for English-language publication by Del Rey Manga, and the first volume was released in February 2009. Del Rey and Kodansha Comics released the first fourteen volumes in North America, the last in April 2012.

== Volume list ==
No.	Original release date	Original ISBN	English release date	English ISBN
1	September 16, 2005	978-4-06-363582-9	February 24, 2009	978-0-345-50893-5
1. "Sayonara, Zetsubou-sensei" (さよなら絶望先生, Sayonara Zetsubō Sensei); 2. "Zetsubou-sensei Returns" (帰ってきた絶望先生, Kaettekita Zetsubō Sensei); 3. "Beyond the Tunnel Was Whiteness" (トンネルを抜けると白かった, Tonneru o Nukeru to Shirokatta); 4. "Before Me, There's No One; Behind Me, There's You" (僕の前に人はいない 僕の後ろに君はいる, Boku no Mae ni Hito wa Inai Boku no Ushiro ni Kimi wa Iru); 5. "Not Losing to Elbows, Not Losing to Knees" (ヒジニモ負ケズ ヒザニモ負ケズ, Hiji nimo Makezu Hiza nimo Makezu); 6. "Fly Over That Country to Come Here" (その国を飛び越して来い, Sono Kuni o Tobikoshite Koi); 7. "The Antenna is Rising... We Must Attempt to Live!" (アンテナ立ちぬ いざ生きめやも, Antena Tachinu Iza Ikimeyamo); 8. "Align Your Books Precisely on the Shelves, Go Out into the Streets!" (書をきちんと本棚にしまって町へ出よう, Sho o Kichinto Hondana ni Shimatte Machi e Deyō); 9. "No Matter What, We've Got to Stick Together" (僕たちは、どんなことがあっても一緒に固まっていなければ駄目だ, Bokutachi wa, Donna Koto ga Atte mo Issho ni Katamatteinakereba Dame da); 10. "This Class Has Many Problems, Please Understand" (当組は問題の多い教室ですからどうかそこはご承知ください, Tōkumi wa Mondai no Ōi Kyōshitsu desu kara dōka Soko wa Goshōchi Kudasai)
On the first day of school, Kafuka Fuura finds a man who has hanged himself amidst blossoming cherry trees. She paradoxically pulls him down while strangling him further. Having survived, the downcast man is bewildered by Kafuka's relentlessly optimistic nature. Later, at school, the man introduces himself as Kafuka's teacher, Nozomu Itoshiki, and she reveals the portentous writing of his name as "despair" (zetsubou) to their second-year class, 2-He. As "Zetsubou-sensei" preaches his hopeless worldview at every opportunity, accompanied by suicide attempts that never succeed, he discovers the troublesome tendencies of his other students, one by one. His irresponsibility and laziness are repeatedly foiled by the strict school counselor, Chie-sensei, and he is quickly rendered subordinate to his own class, several of whom play along with his lecturing while plotting to romantically conquer him. Their lovelorn jealousy is often inflamed by Kafuka's machinations, as her actions betray concealed sophistication, cynicism, and dark intent. Most chapters deal in topical humor, and are summarized by their respective topics.: 1. Naming rights. Introduction of Nozomu Itoshiki and Kafuka Fuura.; 2. Least hopeful career goals. Introduction of Arai Chie.; 3. Zashiki-warashi. Introduction of Kiki Komori.; 4. Undue expressions of love. Introduction of Matoi Tsunetsuki.; 5. Abuse. Introduction of Abiru Kobushi.; 6. Culture clash. Introduction of Kaere Kimura.; 7. Things better left unsaid. Introduction of Meru Otonashi.; 8. Failing to pick a lane. Introduction of Chiri Kitsu.; 9. The complaisance of the Japanese. Introduction of Tarou Maria Sekiuchi.; 10. Introduction of Nami Hitou.
2	December 16, 2005	978-4-06-363619-2	May 19, 2009	978-0-345-51023-5
11. "May the Moon of This Month's Evening Cloud Over with My Tears" (今月今夜のこの月が僕の涙で曇りますように, Kongetsu Kon'ya no Kono Tsuki ga Boku no Namida de Kumorimasu yō ni); 12. "Your Front Hair Swept Back for the First Time" (まだ開けそめし前髪の, Mada Akesomeshi Maegami no); 13. "Thou Shalt Not Know" (君 知りたもうことなかれ, Kimi Shiritamō Koto Nakare); 14. "I'm Predestined to Be in the Shadows" (私は宿命的に日陰者である, Watashi wa Shukumeiteki ni Hikagemono dearu); 15. "Confessions of a Pen Name" (仮名の告白, Kamei no Kokuhaku); 16. "The People Are at the Breaking Point" (民さんはいっぱいいっぱいな人だ, Tami-san wa Ippai Ippai na Hito da); 17. "Sister-in-law, I'm an Aristocrat" (義姉さん 僕は貴族です, Ane-san Boku wa Kizoku desu); 18. "Leap Before You Lock Eyes" (見合う前に跳べ, Miau Mae ni Tobe); 19. "That Is Why You Are Unable to Flee, Follow Me! Philostratus" (それだから逃げるのだ ついて来い!フィロストラトス!, Sore da kara Nigeru no da Tsuite Koi! Firosutoratosu!); 20. "Because It Is So Unstable, I Went to Search the Skies" (あんまり不安定だからわたし空を探しに行ってきましたのよ, Anmari Fuantei da kara Watashi Sora o Sagashi ni Ittekimashita no yo)
11. Wishes.; 12. "Opening" things, in various senses.; 13. Things that one would rather not know.; 14. Greatness that was overshadowed by something still greater. Introduction of Kagerou Usui.; 15. 4-koma. Introduction of Harumi Fujiyoshi.; 16. Things that are on the brink of disaster.; 17. Introduction of Mikoto Itoshiki and the Itoshiki family.; 18. Eye contact.; 19. Name-calling.; 20. Things that are "unstable", in various senses.; The students learn that their teacher hails from a wealthy and influential family, and meet his older brother, Mikoto, a local doctor.
3	March 17, 2006	978-4-06-363646-8	August 25, 2009	978-0-345-51024-2
21. "It's Way Too Gross in This Sad Town" (きもすぎて悲しみの市, Kimosugite Kanashimi no Ichi); 22. "I've Read Books Full of Shame" (恥ずかしい本ばかり読んできました, Hazukashii Hon bakari Yondekimashita); 23. "A Cultured Man Was Waiting for the Rain to Stop Under the Rashomon Gate" (一人の文化人が羅生門の下で雨やどりをしていた, Hitori no Bunka-jin ga Rashōmon no Shita de Amayadori o Shiteita); 24. "The Namayatsuhashi Must Be Burned" (生八ツ橋を焼かねばならぬ, Nama-yatsuhashi o Yakaneba Naranu); 25. "I Am Amakudari. I Still Don't Have Any Work to Do" (吾輩は天下りである 仕事はまだない, Wagahai wa Amakudari dearu Shigoto wa Mada Nai); 26. "As Gregor Samsa Awoke One Morning He Found Himself Carrying a Mikoshi" (ある朝 グレゴール·ザムザが目をさますと神輿を担いでいた, Aru Asa Guregōru Zamuza ga Me o Samasu to Mikoshi o Katsuideita); 27. "Evening Primroses on Mt. Fuji Are a Mistake" (富士に月見草は間違っている, Fuji ni Tsukimisō wa Machigatteiru); 28. "I Was Thinking of Proving It This New Year" (証明しようと思っていた。今年の正月, Shōmei Shiyō to Omotteita. Kotoshi no Shōgatsu); 29. "Because of My Hereditary Lack of Energy, I Have Been Hibernating Since Childhood" (親譲りの無気力で、子供のときから冬眠ばかりしている, Oyayuzuri no Mukiryoku de, Kodomo no Toki kara Tōmin Bakari Shiteiru); 30. "The Musashino of Today is Shrouded in Darkness" (今の武蔵野は闇である, Ima no Musashino wa Yami dearu)
21. Disgusting things. Introduction of Rin Itoshiki.; 22. Things that can be "read". Introduction of Jun Kutou.; 23. Bare minimums.; 24. Dipping a toe in.; 25. Big fish in small ponds.; 26. Idolizing an unexceptional achievement. Introduction of Kotonon.; 27. Mistakes in life. Introduction of Majiru Itoshiki.; 28. Proof.; 29. Being stuck in a holding pattern.; 30. Shames that one cannot live down.; Nozomu's younger sister, Rin, who has only known a life of luxury, begins visiting to satisfy her curiosity about "commoner" life. Nozomu also takes in Majiru, his nephew by way of the family's disowned eldest son, Enishi.
4	June 16, 2006	978-4-06-363703-8	November 24, 2009	978-0-345-51025-9
31. "The Thrownaway Bronze" (青銅のキリステ, Seidō no Kirisute); 32. "I'm Sorry For Being Born on November 4th" (十一月四日に生まれてすいません, Jūnigatsu Yokka ni Umarete Suimasen); 33. "How Do I Organize This One Space?" (この一間 どうして片してよいものか, Kono Hitoma Dōshite Katashite Yoi Mono ka); 34. "Well, 'Tis Better to be a Couple Than to Be by Oneself" (一人より女夫の方がええいうことでっしゃろ, Pin yori Konbi no Hō ga Ee Yū Koto dessharo); 35. "I've Always Called That Person a Leftover" (私はその人を常に残りものと呼んでいた, Watashi wa Sono Hito o Tsune ni Nokorimono to Yondeita); 36. "Tsugaru Correspondence School" (津軽通信教育, Tsugaru Tsūshin Kyōiku); 37. "Ah, Silence..." (あヽ 無言……, Aa Mugon......); 38. "Chocolates Returned Without Hesitation" (惜しみなくチョコは返す, Oshimi Naku Choko wa Kaesu); 39. "The Story Of Jiro" (二郎物語, Jirō Monogatari); 40. "Life Is Like A One-Tier Doll Display" (人生は1段のひな壇にも若かない, Jinsei wa Ichidan no Hinadan nimo Shikanai)
31. Being cut loose.; 32. Being conceived on Christmas Eve.; 33. Unused space.; 34. Spacing out.; 35. Things that were left over.; 36. Certifications.; 37. Keeping silent.; 38. Reneging.; 39. Second opinions.; 40. Downward social comparison.
5	September 15, 2006	978-4-06-363723-6	January 26, 2010	978-0-345-51636-7
41. "The White Lie" (白い虚構, Shiroi Kyokou); 42. "Detox" (シミと毒出し, Shimi to Doku Dashi); 43. "Goodbye, Snow" (雪よ さらば, Yuki yo Saraba); 44. "The Restaurant That Never Takes Orders" (注文は聞かない料理店, Chuumon wa Kikanai Ryouriten); 45. "Weighing In" (身のたけくらべ, Minotakekurabe); 46. "Vita Sexualis" (ベタ·セクシャリス, Beta Sekusharisu); 47. "The Story of Dreamless Houichi" (夢無し芳一の話, Yumenashi Houichi no Hanashi); 48. "Be Prepared" (ヨボー家の人々, Yoboo Ie no Hitobito); 49. "The Secret Code" (暗夜号路, Anya Gou Ro); 50. "Wake Up, Old-fashioned Folks" (新しくない人よ、目覚めよ, Atarashikunai Hito yo, Mezame yo)
41. White lies.; 42. Things that lose their appeal when made wholesome.; 43. Reconciling for the wrong reasons.; 44. Personal prerogatives. Introduction of Kei Itoshiki.; 45. Conspicuous consumption.; 46. Second-guessing the most obvious conclusion. Introduction of Mayo Mitama.; 47. Dreaming.; 48. Precautions that backfire.; 49. Jargon.; 50. Things said to be "old", in various senses. Introduction of Ikkyu-san.
6	December 15, 2006	978-4-06-363762-5	April 27, 2010	978-0-345-51812-5
51. "The Pororoca Wave" (波に乗ってくるポロロッカ); 52. "On the Assumption That We're Brother and Sister" (あにいもうと、という前提で。); 53. "Respect the Original" (あれ、不可よ。原作があるじゃないかね); 54. "The Cat Who'd Heard It a Million Times" (百万回言われた猫); 55. "What a Pain" (なんたる迷惑であることか!); 56. "The Situation Is Terminal" (最早、末期を告げねばならぬ); 57. "The Benefits of Zero" (ゼロの特典); 58. "The Almost-Transparent-Failure Blues" (限りなく惨敗に近いブルー); 59. "Avoiding Love in the Center of the World" (世界の中心で愛を避ける); 60. "The Silver Time Difference" (銀の時差)
51. Cart before the horse.; 52. Acting based on assumptions.; 53. Things that are followed to escape responsibility.; 54. People whose circumstances subject them to the same overly apt remark at every turn.; 55. Self-reproach. Introduction of Ai Kaga.; 56. Signs that various things are in terminal decline.; 57. Actions that are more rewarding under specific conditions.; 58. Disappointment due to high expectations.; 59. Avoidance.; 60. Time flying while having fun, and dragging while bored.
7	February 16, 2007	978-4-06-363793-9	July 27, 2010	978-0-345-51813-2
61. "A Life Without Connections" (縁のある阿呆の一生); 62. "100 Inconveniences" (不便百景); 63. "Prioritize This!" (蟹優先); 64. "Cowards Come in Groups" (ツルムの小心); 65. "The Half Police Report" (半分捕物帳); 66. "The Worthless Opera" (二束三文オペラ); 67. "Whose Money Is It Anyway?" (誰がために金はある); 68. "Map of the Humanities" (文化系図); 69. "Confusing Names" (バラバラの名前); 70. "The Shield" (原型の盾)
61. Lifelong unattained things.; 62. Inconveniences of convenient technology.; 63. Misplaced priorities. Introduction of Wataru Manseibashi.; 64. Collectives.; 65. "Half" things that are not literally halved.; 66. Commoditization.; 67. Inherited advantages.; 68. Non-athletic counterparts of "athletic" things, and vice versa.; 69. Things that are not named literally. Introduction of Kuniya Kino.; 70. Things that bear no resemblance to their former selves.
8	April 17, 2007	978-4-06-363818-9	November 23, 2010	978-0-345-52227-6
71. "Duty and Soldier" (義務と兵隊); 72. "Gone with the Numbers" (数と共に去りぬ); 73. "Shichigosan-Shirou" (七五三四郎); 74. "You're Seventeen Years Old... Don't You Wanna Grab Your Wrinkles?" (十七歳ね、自分のシワをつかんで見たくない?); 75. "Matasaburou Gets a Cold" (風邪の又三郎); 76. "Unwanted Items in the Tempei Era" (天平のいらね); 77. "The Turtle's Fraud" (亀の詐欺にて); 78. "A Woman's Role" (或る女 役); 79. "The Baby Who Swallowed a Go Stone" (碁石を飲んだ赤ちゃん); 80. "The Not So Narrow Gateaway" (狭くない門)
71. Shticks.; 72. Carryovers.; 73. Unfortunate rites of passage.; 74. Acting too young or too old for one's age. Introduction of Manami Ookusa.; 75. Social contagion.; 76. Unwanted freebies.; 77. Make believe for adults rather than children.; 78. Unwittingly playing a thankless role in a momentous occasion for someone else.; 79. Emergencies that should not be broadcast.; 80. Uncontested contests.
9	July 17, 2007	978-4-06-363854-7	June 21, 2011	978-1-935429-79-1
81. "Kamakura Myohonji Temple Dismissal" (鎌倉妙本寺解雇); 82. "Extra Chocolate" (大チョコもり); 83. "No Longer Shogun" (将軍失格); 84. "Record of Ancient Stretching" (古事つけ記); 85. "Decorations at Tiffany's" (ティファニーで装飾を); 86. "Glasses Girl's House" (眼鏡子の家); 87. "Fascism of Love and Total Victory" (愛と全勝のファシズム); 88. "Mountain Man's April Fools" (山男の四月馬鹿); 89. "'It's recharging', said Yada-chan in a quiet voice" (「充電ですの。」とヤダちゃんが小声で言った。); 90. "'Don't act like it's nothing!' Melos rebutted in a rage" (「さらっと言うな!」とメロスは、いきり立って反駁した)
81. People who fell from favor.; 82. Unromantic Valentine's chocolates.; 83. "Shogun" as a figure of speech.; 84. Drawing an unwarranted connection.; 85. Ostentation.; 86. Kneejerk prejudicial worldviews.; 87. Suffering from a shortcoming while backhandedly complimenting someone who does not.; 88. Joking by serious people.; 89. Returning from a hiatus worse than before. Then, second winds.; 90. Dropping a bombshell offhandedly.
10	September 14, 2007	978-4-06-363887-5	August 16, 2011	978-1-935429-80-7
91. "If you work by reason, you grow rough-edged; if you choose to oar into sentiment's stream, it will sweep you away. Demanding your own way only serves to constrain you. However you look at it, the human world is a three-way standoff" (智に働けば角が立つ。情に棹させば流される。意地を通せば窮屈だ。とかくこの世は3すくみ。); 92. "Time to celebrate, though in this world there's nothing worth celebrating" (おめでたき こともなき世を おめでたく); 93. "I'm telling you, I'm not myself these days. Every little thing makes me so mad" (だから僕は、このごろ毎日、不自然なんだ。ひどく怒りっぽくなった。); 94. "When the Fruits of Exposure Ripen" (暴露の実の熟する時); 95. "You must profit from disaster as Kinkaku" (金閣で焼け太らねばならぬ); 96. "I will not return to Japan. I could not make that promise" (私は日本には帰りません。そういう決心をできませんでした。); 97. "Concealment in the Ranks" (隠蔽卒); 98. "The Serene Realm Beyond Entitlement" (恩着せの彼方に); 99. "A Landing Amply Rewarded" (着陸の栄え); 100. "A Roadside Artist" (路傍の絵師)
91. Sets of three counterbalancing things.; 92. Actions that oversell oneself.; 93. "Unnatural" things, in various senses.; 94. Putting up a front that is soon exposed.; 95. Profiting from being publicly disgraced.; 96. Indecision between two choices, only to choose neither.; 97. Things not known to one's parents.; 98. Fishing for gratitude.; 99. Easing someone into a rude awakening.; 100. Being sidetracked by a peculiar detail.
11	December 17, 2007	978-4-06-363929-2	October 18, 2011	978-1-935429-81-4
101. "All Quiet on the Unnecessary Front" (勝負戦線異状なし); 102. "Dr. Jekyll and Mr. Seed" (ジキル博士とシード氏); 103. "Wuthering Blights" (晒しが丘); 104. "Doctor Kahogo" (ドクトル·カホゴ); 105. "The Releaser in the Rye" (ライ麦畑で見逃して); 106. "Rekka-Ryusui" (劣化流水); 107. "Spy Nut Pudding" (スパイナツプリン); 108. "The Off-Guard Road to the Interior" (奥の抜け道); 109. "Banned Abstract" (発禁抄); 110. "Hear the Wind Sleep" (風の中で聴け)
101. Failing to pick one's battles.; 102. Placements based on unflattering qualifications. Then, how to qualify as "21st-century".; 103. Discovering one's worst self as a tourist.; 104. Overprotectiveness.; 105. Blissful ignorance.; 106. Things that underperform on purpose.; 107. Innocent situations where one is suspected of spying.; 108. Carelessness.; 109. Behind-the-scenes intrigues.; 110. Becoming the center of a controversy from the sidelines.
12	February 15, 2008	978-4-06-363949-0	December 20, 2011	978-1-935429-82-1
111. "The First-Timer Condition" (一見の條件); 112. "Daidoji Shinsuke: The Voice" (大導寺信輔の音声); 113. "Naomi (A Fool's 'It's Hot')" (痴人のアリ); 114. "Adult Go-Ahead" (大人の決行); 115. "The Double-Binders" (ダブルンの市民); 116. "The Last Defoliation" (最後の落葉); 117. "The Grapes of Disappointment" (がっかりの葡萄); 118. "Hunt of a New Laborer" (蘇る勤労); 119. "Multiple Full Circles" (様々なる一周); 120. "One Thousand and One Christmasses" (聖夜一夜物語)
111. Things that are inaccessible to newcomers.; 112. Voice. Introduction of Meru's father.; 113. Deferring to other people's bad taste against one's better judgment.; 114. Privileges gained and lost with adulthood.; 115. Double binds.; 116. To "fall" in various senses.; 117. Letdowns. Then, giving off bad vibes.; 118. When non-workers "work", and when workers do no work.; 119. Coming full circle.; 120. Being pitied for spending Christmas like any other day.
13	May 16, 2008	978-4-06-363985-8	February 21, 2012	978-1-61262-077-0
121. "The Individualism of Passing" (渡しの個人主義); 122. "Comparing Abysses" (断崖の比較); 123. "Gaman-esque" (ガマンネスク); 124. "The Emergency That Became a Nun" (尼になった急場); 125. "Marco Polo's Setsubun" (東方節分録); 126. "The Sweet Girl" (あまい姫); 127. "The Way to Hell" (落園への道); 128. "The Measles of Madison County" (マディソン郡のはしか); 129. "Time Stories of Russia" (おろしや国タイム譚); 130. "The Loser Book" (負けたの草子)
121. Undesirable handoffs.; 122. Having only one standard for all comparisons.; 123. Disinhibition.; 124. Emergency makeshifts.; 125. Shadowboxing.; 126. Honey trapping.; 127. Superstition.; 128. Ills that are more safely befallen in childhood than adulthood.; 129. Things that belatedly take effect.; 130. Showdowns where both sides come off as losers.
14	July 17, 2008	978-4-06-384011-7	April 3, 2012	978-1-61262-078-7
131. "The Forest of Flower Keepers" (花係の森); 132. "The Woman in the Yellow Sands" (黄砂の女); 133. "The Murders in the Rue Are Not Included" (対象街の殺人); 134. "The Postman of Spring Always Rings Twice" (春の郵便配達は二度ベルを鳴らす); 135. "Chapaev and Elimination" (チャパーエフと消去); 136. "The Protest's Intent" (デモの意図); 137. "Only Yesterday" (おもひこみでぼろぼろ); 138. "It Is Said That Procedural Happiness Is the Root of All Evil" (曰く、過程の幸福は諸悪の本); 139. "Determination of Innocence" (決定無罪); 140. "The World with Words" (言葉のある世界)
131. Buying into the gimmick.; 132. Catching strays.; 133. Exclusions, exceptions and exemptions.; 134. Unpleasant tidings of spring.; 135. Process of elimination.; 136. Protesters who fail to pick a side.; 137. Placebos and nocebos.; 138. Lingering on process while neglecting outcome.; 139. Outsized influence.; 140. Euphemisms.
15	October 17, 2008	978-4-06-384049-0; 978-4-06-937273-5 (limited edition)	—	—
141. "" (余は如何にして真人間となりし乎, Yo wa ikani shite maningen tonari shika); 142. "" (恥と卵, Haji to tamago); 143. "" (六月の崩袈裟固め, Rokugatsu no kuzurekesagatame); 144. "" (ククリなき命を, Kukuri naki inochi o); 145. "" (祝系図, Iwai keizu); 146. "" (いた子さんと兎, Itako-san to usagi); 147. "" (てりやき狂言, Teriyaki kyōgen); 148. "" (失われたオチを求めて, Ushinawa reta ochi o motomete); 149. "" (暗中問答, Anchū mondō); 150. "" (予言省告示, Yogen-shō kokuji)
141. Faux pas.; 142. Antics that are reined in by sudden self-consciousness.; 143. Feuds.; 144. Individuals who presume to speak for entire groups. Then, the "Coocle" search engine's unflattering generalizations.; 145. Special occasions where celebration is inappropriate.; 146. Putting one's own words in someone else's mouth.; 147. Things that come off strangely when done by the book.; 148. Familiar tropes that are now seldom-seen.; 149. The difficulty of writing new jokes for a long-running manga.; 150. Knowingly making a futile effort.
16	February 17, 2009; February 13, 2009 (limited edition)	978-4-06-384096-4; 978-4-06-937274-2 (limited edition)	—	—
151. "" (尾州鎮撫隊, Bishū chinbu-tai); 152. "" (黙人の行方は、誰も知らない, Mokunin no yukue wa, daremoshiranai); 153. "" (ああサプライズだよ、と私はうつろに呟くのであった, Ā sapuraizuda yo, to watashi wa utsuro ni tsubuyaku nodeatta); 154. "" (持つ女, Motsu on'na); 155. "" (うもれすく, Umoresuku); 156. "" (君よ知るや隣の国, Kimiyo shiru ya tonari no kuni); 157. "" (夜の多角形, Yoru no takaku kei); 158. "" (アンドロイドは機械の花嫁の夢を見るか, Andoroido wa kikai no hanayome no yumewomiru ka); 159. "" (学者アゲアシトリの見た着物, Gakusha ageashitori no mita kimono); 160. "" (最後の、そして始まりのエノデン, Saigo no, soshite hajimari no enoden)
151. Learning of something after the fact.; 152. Approval bodies.; 153. Surprises.; 154. Multiply gifted people.; 155. Enclaves.; 156. People who disrupt daily life to the point of sabotage.; 157. Being desensitized when a problem takes many forms. Introduction of Kanako Oura.; 158. The razor and blades racket. Introduction of Miko Nezu and Shoko Maruuchi.; 159. Committing gaffes for attention.; 160. Seeking opinions after one has already decided.
17	May 15, 2009	978-4-06-384120-6	—	—
161. "" (イキてこそ); 162. "" (大逸走); 163. "" (×の悲劇); 164. "" (往復の王子); 165. "" (告白縮緬組); 166. "" (アーとウルーとビィの冒険); 167. "" (ハルピンの一矢); 168. "" (削られた恋占い); 169. "" (ジェレミーとドラコンの卵); 170. "" (三次のあと)
161. Situational irony.; 162. Triple threats of non-talents.; 163. People who are "switched on" by their hobbyhorses.; 164. Undesirable advancements in status.; 165. Confessing.; 166. Supernumeraries.; 167. Passive-aggressive kinds of revenge.; 168. Cutting the indispensable parts of things.; 169. The range of one's comfort zone.; 170. Wishful thinking.
18	August 17, 2009; August 19, 2009 (limited edition)	978-4-06-384170-1; 978-4-06-358302-1 (limited edition)	—	—
171. "" (強引の窓); 172. "" (三十年後の正解); 173. "" (こんにちはご起源いかが); 174. "" (過多たたき); 175. "" (終われない事実); 176. "" (クラックな卵); 177. "" (男もすなる夢日記といふものを、女もしてみむとてするなり); 178. "" (葬られ損ねた秘密); 179. "" (われらライナス); 180. "" (暗黙童話)
171. Dangerous allures.; 172. Giving the right answer on the wrong occasion.; 173. Disputed origins.; 174. Superlatives.; 175. Market runs.; 176. Chicken or the egg.; 177. Dream diaries.; 178. The Taepodong-2.; 179. Security objects.; 180. Unwritten rules.
19	November 17, 2009; November 13, 2009 (limited edition)	978-4-06-384208-1; 978-4-06-358306-9 (limited edition)	—	—
181. "" (ウィルス将軍と三人兄弟の医者); 182. "" (傍観者たち); 183. "" (閉門ノススメ); 184. "" (流行り短し走れよ乙女); 185. "" (ネジまき鳥クロニクル); 186. "" (貧しき人々の胸); 187. "" (誤字院原の敵討); 188. "" (かぶったさんのカレーライス); 189. "" (夏かしい人たち); 190. "" (散る散る・満ちる)
181. Reviving something that has run its course.; 182. The bystander effect.; 183. Lockdown.; 184. Affectation.; 185. Busywork. Introduction of Taku Gojiki and Hajime Kuji.; 186. Boasting with meager claims.; 187. Major mistakes overlooked while catching minor ones.; 188. Things that encroach on each other. Then, other kinds of people called "sensei".; 189. When a unit of measurement cuts off sooner than one would like.; 190. Trash, in various senses. Introduction of Tane Kitsu.
20	February 17, 2010; February 15, 2010 (limited edition)	978-4-06-384246-3; 978-4-06-358313-7 (limited edition)	—	—
191. "" (カンサツ・シティ); 192. "" (狼と一匹の子山羊); 193. "" (神さんが流されてきた); 194. "" (終われぬ夏を抱いて); 195. "" (個性肝要記); 196. "" (くみあはせ); 197. "" (早すぎたMy soul); 198. "" (ブンカとカワウソの冒険); 199. "" (０・００１秒の天国と地獄); 200. "" (長い長いさっしん)
191. Observation journals.; 192. Receiving awkward one-on-one treatment at a venue because no one else showed up.; 193. Sequacity.; 194. Holding out after something is over.; 195. Gratuitous displays of individuality.; 196. Things that were combined for non-obvious purposes.; 197. Things that should not be discovered early.; 198. Subdivision.; 199. The momentary lapse of self-preservation in the face of imminent danger.; 200. Legacy costs.
21	May 17, 2010	978-4-06-384307-1	—	—
201. "" (スキマの手毬唄); 202. "" (対極の環飾); 203. "" (シフトは乱れて); 204. "" (ねぶみ小僧の谷); 205. "" (その線を飛び越して来い!); 206. "" (プルトップの伝説より); 207. "" (セット内海の惨劇); 208. "" (わたくしのなかのあなた); 209. "" (大いなる徴収); 210. "" (豆まきごんのしん)
201. Filling gaps.; 202. Arguing past each other.; 203. Personalization.; 204. Pricing.; 205. Pulling a stunt that is far tamer than what someone else got away with.; 206. Beliefs that one should grow out of.; 207. Things that come with other things.; 208. Putting the onus on someone else.; 209. Things that can't be had in full.; 210. Trivia.
22	August 17, 2010	978-4-06-384344-6	—	—
211. "" (知りすぎて普通の男); 212. "" (悦子立場逆転); 213. "" (戸棚の奥深くのソクラテス); 214. "" (滑りゆく新世界); 215. "" (身代わりひな人形のラブソング); 216. "" (ルールとミミ); 217. "" (起承転結を思ひがけんとすれば); 218. "" (オンリー・ハル・キラー); 219. "" (たわむれにリスクを背負いて); 220. "" (繋がれた毎日)
211. Things that stop mattering when there is too much.; 212. Reversed responsibilities.; 213. Depth.; 214. Change.; 215. Scapegoats.; 216. Moving the goalposts.; 217. Leaving out endings.; 218. Proving a negative.; 219. Risk without reward.; 220. Perverse pride.
23	November 17, 2010	978-4-06-384396-5	—	—
221. "" (さまよえるミランダ人); 222. "" (幸いなるかな心貧しき土地); 223. "" (摘むや摘まざるや); 224. "" (その神は今生まれたばかりだといふ事は一目に解った); 225. "" (清兵衛が瓢箪で瓢箪が清兵衛); 226. "" (花ムコ村と貴族たち); 227. "" (別れろ切れろはしっぽの人にいう言葉); 228. "" (分母変); 229. "" (光あれ。するとワカメがあった); 230. "" (老人は網などなくしてしまった)
221. Giving fair warning.; 222. Demoralizing places.; 223. Things that should be nipped in the bud.; 224. God complex.; 225. Things whose contents were swapped.; 226. When weddings are auspicious for brides but not grooms.; 227. Surpassing one's former cohorts after being ousted.; 228. Failing to compare things on the same scale.; 229. Wakame.; 230. Things that caused unforeseen repercussions when left unattended.
24	February 17, 2011	978-4-06-384443-6	—	—
231. "" (ニャン京の基督); 232. "" (半七見世物帳); 233. "" (四十日と四十夜のアリバイ); 234. "" (放射後のロックンロール・パーティ); 235. "" (初手に告げるなかれ); 236. "" (遅き・琴・菊); 237. "" (見られようが見られまいが我間接); 238. "" (この道はいつも通らない道); 239. "" (団結は手抜きなり); 240. "" (ぐりとぐだぐだのおおおかさばき)
231. Mondegreens.; 232. When something is shown, but is not for viewing. Then, kappas.; 233. Trying to look busy.; 234. Going from one extreme to another.; 235. Starting something off on the wrong foot.; 236. Opportunities that were seized too late.; 237. Indirection.; 238. Things never used all one's life.; 239. The Ringelmann effect.; 240. Impartial yet unfair decisions.
25	April 15, 2011	978-4-06-384483-2	—	—
241. "" (蔓延元年のハロウィン); 242. "" (安定期というには若すぎる); 243. "" (いろいろと飛ぶ教室); 244. "" (五位は五六年前から焼き芋と云ふ物に、異常な執着を持つてゐる); 245. "" (人間悪平等起源論); 246. "" (さ部); 247. "" (ハラの立ちたることもなしと思えば); 248. "" (七草物語); 249. "" (イワンのなかば); 250. "" (一杯のエスプレッソ分)
241. Gresham's law.; 242. Being home free after getting to a turning point.; 243. Skipping a necessary step.; 244. Being rejected as too good.; 245. Things done in one case that should not be done in all cases.; 246. Interests that should not be shared in a club.; 247. Tolerating something by pretending it is something else.; 248. Seven herbs.; 249. The Zeigarnik effect.; 250. Sliding scale fees.
26	July 15, 2011	978-4-06-384519-8	—	—
251. "" (生まれ出づる難民); 252. "" (蒲団に入ると気持ちいい); 253. "" (『いきすぎ』の構造); 254. "" (壁木灘); 255. "" (親譲りの無鉄砲で子供の時からゾロ目ばかり見てゐる); 256. "" (出でよ、オツベルと象!); 257. "" (よだかは実に柄にも無いことを言いました); 258. "" (大ら鏡); 259. "" (アウェイなる一族); 260. "" (角度ならないこともない)
251. Relative deprivation.; 252. The Barnum effect.; 253. Prosecutorial storytelling.; 254. Hitting a wall.; 255. The frequency illusion.; 256. Being summoned.; 257. Having an uncharacteristic grasp of something.; 258. Half full or half empty.; 259. Homefield disadvantage.; 260. Things that can't be seen from certain angles.
27	October 17, 2011; October 14, 2011 (limited edition)	978-4-06-384566-2; 978-4-06-358367-0 (limited edition)	—	—
261. "" (春は曙。やうやう難くなりゆくやめ際。); 262. "" (夜の霧); 263. "" (どーせ書生気質); 264. "" (あひあひゞき); 265. "" (あめれおん日記); 266. "" (笹の上のメモ); 267. "" (節電中の日本より); 269. "" (蒲田未更新曲); 270. "" (代理の子); 271. "" (能動とは何か)
261. Things that are hard to continue but harder to quit.; 262. Sleepwalking.; 263. Leaving something undone until next time it needs doing.; 264. Umbrellas.; 265. Misfits who fit into certain surroundings.; 266. Historically significant years.; 267. Not laughing.; 269. Treating people based on outdated information.; 270. Interloping.; 271. Being baited into making the first move.; The limited edition of volume 27 was bundled with an audio CD containing an additional story titled 希望と絶望のはざまで (with the English title "Between Hope and Despair"), performed by the anime cast.
28	February 17, 2012	978-4-06-384629-4	—	—
272. "" (あいまいな日本の形); 273. "" (唯ぼんやりとしてるから不安); 274. "" (善いサマリア人ね。善いサマリア人は善いね。); 275. "" (一割の労苦); 276. "" (悲しき絶対); 277. "" (バレときどきぶた); 278. "" (似勢物語); 279. "" (釣れ釣れ草); 280. "" (時をかけるニート); 281. "" (曾根崎心中未遂)
272. Enclothed cognition.; 273. Seeking a reason when there is none.; 274. No good deed goes unpunished.; 275. The ninety–ninety rule.; 276. Autotelism.; 277. Spoilers.; 278. When the inside does not match the outside.; 279. Attracting a different following than intended.; 280. Upward counterfactual thinking.; 281. When partway is success and all the way is failure.; The class returns from summer vacation, suddenly noticing that they have become class 3-He and are half a year to graduation. They facetiously dismiss the implication that the manga will soon end.
29	May 17, 2012	978-4-06-384673-7	—	—
282. "" (山なみのあちらにも同じ人がゐる); 283. "" (宇治拾位物語); 284. "" (すべてがカプになる); 285. "" (グダグダースの犬); 286. "" (在庫の人は); 287. "" (悲式玩具); 288. "" (横倒れつちまった悲しみに); 289. "" (第二第二ハッピー); 290. "" (出席番号二十三の瞳); 291. "" (畳の国のアリス)
282. Being spotted here when one should be there.; 283. Rounding out a top ten list.; 284. Twosomes.; 285. Winning by attrition.; 286. Remaindered stock.; 287. Formulas by which someone "graduates".; 288. "Beans" that can make someone fall.; 289. Things that are iconic in one place but generic anywhere else.; 290. Color associations.; 291. Failing to follow through.; The class's graduation photos are collected, but there is no photo of Kafuka among them. Then, when Abiru's eyepatch comes off, she sees most of the girls in class as Kafuka, including herself. Kafuka no longer appears in the chapters that follow.
30	August 17, 2012	978-4-06-384705-5	—	—
292. "" (入れ替えばや物語); 293. "" (ゲンソー先生); 294. "" (卒業と入学のあいだ); 295. "" (イン・ザ・クール); 296. "" (新・陳・人); 297. "" (（あと）五回の憂鬱); 298. "" (ようこそ絶望先生); 299. "" (絶望の組の幸福な少女たち); 300. "" (私たちの知っている可符香ちゃんは天使みたいないい子でした); Final chapter. "Sayonara, Zetsubou-sensei" (さよなら絶望先生)
292. Anagrams.; 293. Social constructs.; 294. Interims.; 295. Playing it too cool.; 296. Becoming someone new.; 297. Posthumous marriage.; 298. "Goodbye, Zetsubou-sensei"; 299. "Goodbye, Zetsubou girls" 300. "Goodbye, Kafuka Fuura"; Final chapter. Mischiefs that are excusable in childhood but not adulthood. The last standalone chapter is 295; the ending runs continuously through chapters 296 and later. On graduation day, Majiru is confused when Zetsubou-sensei addresses each of the girls by posthumous names. The girls explain to Majiru that the graduation was not for them, but for the restless spirits of a number of girls who died untimely deaths during the Shōwa era; most of the 2-He girls had once attempted suicide, and each was visited by one of these spirits afterwards. 2-He had been, all along, roleplaying as students and teacher, joined by their near-death experiences that allow them to speak to the dead, for the sake of laying these lingering souls to rest by living out their unfinished school days. The Itoshiki family set up the memorial rituals behind the scenes, while the boys in class were actually designated backups for Zetsubou-sensei. With this seven-year memorial service completed, the girls gratefully acknowledge Zetsubou-sensei as their teacher one last time. Meanwhile, the police discover that "Kafuka Fuura" is not a real person, and interrogate Mikoto and Chie-sensei over this discrepancy. The two admit that "Kafuka" is a pseudonym invented to honor the memory of a deceased organ donor named An Akagi, taken from a beloved book of hers: The Metamorphosis by Franz Kafka. The 2-He girls had each received a life-saving transplant from "Kafuka", and now take turns supernaturally manifesting her personality and memory, still encoded in her tissues beyond her death. Chie-sensei concludes that the girls will all forget Kafuka, even as she becomes an indelible part of each of them. On a remote island, Zetsubou-sensei starts a new class. Chiri, not placated by her posthumous graduation, sets all the girls upon him to compete for his hand in "posthumous marriage". Fleeing to a chapel, Zetsubou-sensei encounters one of the would-be brides, and knowingly greets her as one of the Kafukas. An epilogue appended to the collected edition explains that Nozomu has long misguidedly blamed himself for An's accidental death, and intends to marry "Kafuka" to make amends. This is followed by "chapter 30X", showing a "possible" outcome: because "Kafuka" is not one person but many, Nozomu pledges his devotion to her by marrying and divorcing the 2-He girls one by one in an endless cycle. With each, he rears a child bearing Kafuka's face and his own name. Now living communally, Nozomu's wives offer up transfusions to an injured woman, adding the hapless victim to their ranks.

== Chapter 268 ==
Chapter 268, published in July 2011 and titled "Pei no Kakujū" (ペイの拡充), discusses real-world pay-to-work jobs, then imagines a world where sellers pay money to buyers. After its magazine publication, due to similarities to the Doraemon story "A World Without Money" (お金のいらない世界), chapter 268 was left out of the collected tankōbon.

Kumeta explains the incident in volume 27: after receiving reader complaints, Kumeta voluntarily contacted Shogakukan's Doraemon department, who concluded that the similarities were unintentional. Despite receiving clearance, Kumeta still held back chapter 268 due to suspecting himself of subconscious plagiarism.
