= Black flight =

Demographic concept in the United States

Black flight is a term applied to the migration of African Americans from predominantly black or mixed inner-city areas in the United States to suburbs and newly constructed homes on the outer edges of cities. While more attention has been paid to this since the 1990s, the movement of black people to the suburbs has been underway for some time, with nine million people having migrated from 1960 to 2000. Their goals have been similar to those of the white middle class, whose out-migration was called white flight: newer housing, better schools for their children, and attractive environments. From 1990 to 2000, the percentage of African Americans who lived in the suburbs increased to a total of 39 percent, rising 5 percentage points in that decade. Most who moved to the suburbs after World War II were middle class.

Early years of residential change increased in the late 1960s after passage of civil rights legislation ended segregation, and African Americans could exercise more choices in housing and jobs. Since the 1950s, a period of major restructuring of industries and loss of hundreds of thousands of industrial jobs in northeast and Midwest cities began. Since the late 20th century, these events led to reduced density in formerly black neighborhoods in cities such as Chicago, Detroit, and Philadelphia, which have also had absolute population decreases, losing white population as well. Since the 2000 census, the number and proportion of black population has decreased in several major cities, including New York, Los Angeles, Atlanta, Austin, Cleveland, Denver, Miami, San Francisco, Seattle, St. Louis and Washington, DC.

In addition to moving to suburbs, since 1965 African Americans have been returning to the South in a New Great Migration, especially since 1990 to the states of Georgia, Texas, Maryland, and Virginia, whose economies have expanded. In many cases, they are following the movement of jobs to the suburbs and the South. Because more African Americans are attaining college degrees, they are better able to find and obtain better-paying jobs and move to the suburbs. Most African-American migrants leaving the northern regions have gone to the "New South" states, where economies and jobs have grown from knowledge industries, services and technology.

Achieving higher education has contributed to an increase in overall affluence within the African-American community, with increasing median income. According to a 2007 study, average African-American family income has increased, but the gap with white families has increased slightly.

== History ==
=== Suburban flight ===
Since the 1960s, many middle-class African-Americans have been moving to the suburbs for newer housing and good schools, just as European Americans had done before them. From 1960 to 2000, the number of African Americans who moved to suburbs was nine million, a number considerably higher than the Great Migration of African-Americans from the rural South to the North during the first half of the century. As C. Hocker writes,

The fact is African Americans desire the same things all Americans want for their families: employment opportunities with well-paying positions that can keep up with -or stay ahead of- the cost of living; the chance to own affordable homes in safe neighborhoods; quality options for educating our children; and the social and cultural amenities that make it all worthwhile. Right now, the South, more than any other region of the country, is living up to that promise.

==== By city ====
In the last 25 years, for example, the population of Prince George's County, Maryland, where suburban housing was developed near Washington, DC, became majority African American. By 2006 it was the wealthiest majority-black county in the nation. Similar to White Americans, African Americans continue to move to more distant areas. Charles County, Maryland has become the next destination for middle-class black migrants from Washington and other areas; by 2002, the students in the school system were majority black. Charles County has the fastest-growing black population of any large county in the nation except the Atlanta suburbs. Randallstown near Baltimore has also become a majority-black suburb. Some other major majority-black suburbs include localities around:

- Atlanta (College Park, East Point)
- Birmingham (Bessemer)
- Chicago (Harvey, Matteson, Maywood, Merrillville, Robbins)
- Cincinnati (Forest Park)
- Dallas (Desoto, Glenn Heights, Lancaster)
- Detroit (Eastpointe, Harper Woods, Inkster, Oak Park, Southfield)
- Houston (Missouri City)
- Los Angeles (Ladera Heights, View Park-Windsor Hills)
- Miami (Miami Gardens)
- New York City (Hempstead, Mount Vernon, Roosevelt, Wyandanch)
- Newark (East Orange, Irvington, Orange, Plainfield)
- Orlando (Pine Hills)
- Philadelphia (Darby, Willingboro, Yeadon)
- Pittsburgh (Rankin, Wilkinsburg)
- Saint Louis (Berkeley, Ferguson, Kinloch)

In 1950 few northern cities yet had majority or near majority percentages of black people, nor did southern ones: Washington, DC was 35 percent African American and Baltimore was 40 percent. From 1950 to 1970, the black population increased dramatically in Philadelphia, Pittsburgh, Newark, Chicago, Detroit, Cleveland, St. Louis, Kansas City, Cincinnati and Indianapolis. By 1960, 75 percent of black persons lived in urban environments, while white people had been moving to suburbs in large numbers following WWII. Black flight has altered the hyper-urban density that had resulted from the Second Great Migration to cities (1940–70), with hyper-segregation in inner-city areas, such as in Chicago, St. Louis, and East St. Louis.

Job losses in former industrial cities have often pushed population out, as people migrate to other areas to find new work. In the 1950s and 1960s, numerous black people from Chicago began to move to suburbs south of the city to improve their housing. Industry job losses hit those towns, too, and many people have left the area altogether. Chicago lost population from 1970 to 1990, with some increases as of the 2000 census, and decreases again from 2000 to 2005. Since 2000, nearly 55,000 black people have left Chicago, although one million still live in the city. The migrants caused losses in businesses, churches, and other African-American community institutions. The concentration of poverty and deterioration of inner-city public schools in many cities also contributes to pushing black parents to move their families to suburban areas, with historically better funded schools. Detroit and Philadelphia are two other major industrial cities that have suffered dramatic population losses since the mid-20th century due to the loss of industrial jobs.

Reviews of the 2000 census showed that African Americans have also left New York, but continued in-migration of young whites and immigrants has appeared to stabilize the white proportion of residents. Joseph J. Salvo, director of the New York Department of City Planning's population division, noted the diversity within the white population, as older White Americans are replaced by new immigrants, including the many Hispanics who identify as white. Similarly, black out-migration from Boston since 2000 resulted in the city's becoming majority white again by 2006. In 1970 at the peak of African-American expansion in Washington, DC, black people comprised 70% of the capital's population. The percentage of black population has decreased significantly - to 55.6% in 2007, down nearly 8% since 2000, and much more since the 1970s.

California cities, a destination for black migrants from 1940 to 1970, have changed as well. The state has lost black migrants for the first time in three decades. San Francisco has had the largest decrease in black population, 23 percent from 1990 to 2000, but Oakland, Los Angeles and San Diego also have had losses. In Los Angeles, the percentage of population that is black has dropped by half to 9.9% since 1970, a proportion that also reflects recent increased Hispanic and Asian immigration.

The large inner-city area of South Los Angeles offers an example of change caused by ethnic succession, where new immigrants replace former residents who move away or where an older generation is replaced by young people with children. This also often occurs because African Americans have emulated the white flight of their European American counterparts and move to the outer sections of the Greater Los Angeles areas to escape the ever-increasing Hispanic population. In 1985 African Americans made up 72% of the population of the area. By 2006 the black proportion of the population had decreased to just 46%. The Latino population had risen from 21% in 1985 to 51% in 2006, as one population replaced another. From 2004 to 2005, Latino demand for housing caused prices to rise more than 40 percent in Watts and South Central Los Angeles.

=== New Great Migration ===
With the reverse movement of the New Great Migration, the South has been the gaining region for black migrants coming from all three other census regions, especially from 1995 to 2000. The chief gaining states have been Georgia, Texas, North Carolina, Florida, Maryland, Virginia and Tennessee. In the same period, Georgia, Texas and Maryland attracted the most black college graduates. Atlanta, Dallas, and Houston have the highest increase of African Americans respectively. Several smaller metro areas also saw sizable gains, including San Antonio; Raleigh and Greensboro, N.C.; and Orlando. In a change from previous settlement patterns, new regional migrants settle directly in the suburbs, the areas of largest residential growth and often the location of jobs as well. In addition to Atlanta, the top metropolitan areas attracting African Americans include Charlotte, Houston, Dallas, Raleigh, Washington, D.C., Tampa, Virginia Beach, San Antonio, Memphis, Orlando, Nashville, Jacksonville, and so forth.

== Phenomena ==
=== Economic disparities ===
The economic disparities between some classes of European Americans and African Americans have diminished. Black Americans today have a median income level much higher than they did in the 1990 census and as compared to the 2000 census, after inflation is considered. African Americans occupy a higher percentage of high-paying jobs within the USA than they used to. This has led to a rapidly increasing black middle class. Many of United States suburbs are becoming diversified with black and white residents coexisting in affluent neighborhoods. With the economic division within similar classes declining between races, African-American movement to the suburbs has resulted in some suburbs becoming more diverse.

The extent to which increased economic prosperity among African Americans has led to integration among white people and black people is debatable. Some scholars suggest that the narrowing economic divide is helping the US to become an increasingly "color-blind" society, but others note the de facto segregation in many residential areas and continuing social discrimination.

=== Inner-city home value appreciation ===
In other instances, longtime black homeowners in central city areas have "cashed out" at retirement age and profited from increasing home values. These longtime residents have relocated to more affordable condominiums in outlying suburban areas, or in other regions altogether.

=== School shifts ===
The term "black flight" has also been used to describe African-American parents in some cities moving their children from public schools to charter schools or suburban schools featuring open enrollment. This has taken place in a variety of places, including the Twin Cities and the Dallas/Fort Worth Metroplex. Other issues in the city proper of Dallas include an increase in immigration of Latinos. In the 1980s and 1990s, the school district had a majority of black students. Today it has a preponderance of Latino students, in a kind of ethnic succession that reflects residential changes in the city. Latinos constitute 68 percent of students, while black people are 26 percent, and whites are 5 percent. In addition, 87 percent of the Latino students qualify as "economically disadvantaged," and many are just learning English. Middle-class black people are moving to suburbs in a repetition of earlier migration of middle-class whites. The issues of schools and residential patterns are strongly related to economic class, as well as parents' preferring that their children go to schools with native speakers of English.

== See also ==
- Gentrification
- Historic preservation
- Mortgage discrimination
- Planned shrinkage
- Redlining
- Urban decay
- The Boondocks (TV series)
