= Second Great Migration (African American) =

Migrations in the US from 1940 to 1970

External videos
- Booknotes interview with Nicholas Lemann on The Promised Land, May 5, 1991, C-SPAN
- Q&A interview with Isabel Wilkerson on The Warmth of Other Suns, September 26, 2010, C-SPAN

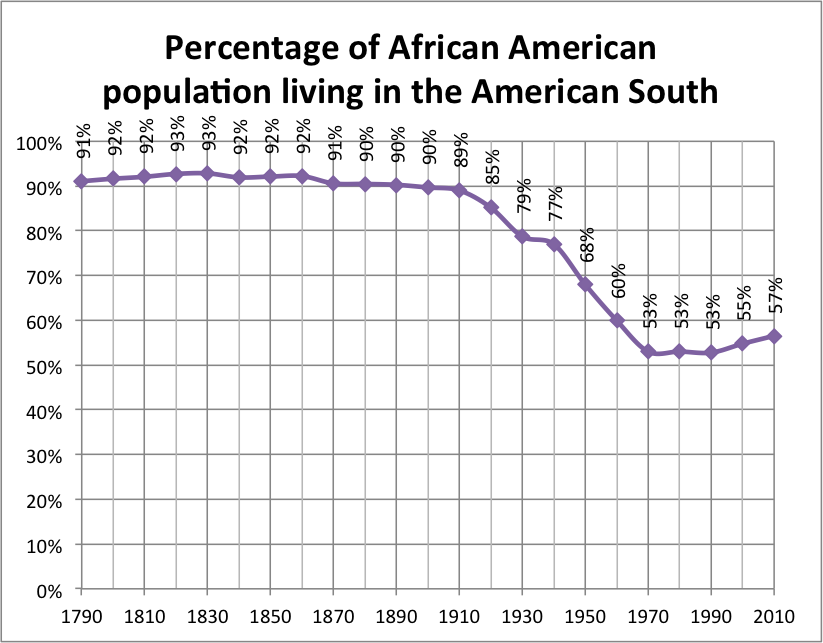
Graph showing the percentage of the African-American population living in the American South, 1790–2010.

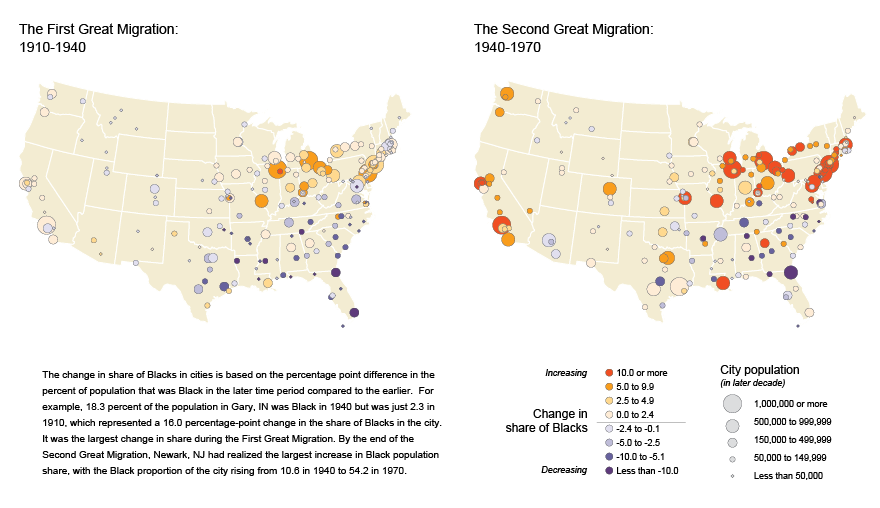
First and Second Great Migrations shown through changes in African-American share of population in major U.S. cities, 1916–1930 and 1940–1970

In the context of the 20th-century history of the United States, the Second Great Migration was the migration of more than 5 million African Americans from the South to the Northeast, Midwest and West. It began in 1940, through World War II, and lasted until 1970. It was much larger and of a different character than the first Great Migration (1916–1940), where the migrants were mainly rural farmers from the South and only came to the Northeast and Midwest.

In the Second Great Migration, not only the Northeast and Midwest continued to be the destination of more than 5 million African Americans, but also the West as well, where cities like Los Angeles, Oakland, Phoenix, Portland, and Seattle offered skilled jobs in the defense industry. Most of these migrants were already urban laborers who came from the cities of the South. In addition, African Americans were still treated with discrimination in parts of the country, and many sought to escape this.

Before the arrival of Black Southerners, the Black community in Los Angeles and California was mainly rooted in a complex Black identity with Afro-Mexicans of mixed Spanish, indigenous and African ancestry. By 1821, Mexico had abolished slavery as part of the Atlantic slave trade, and thus, these Afro-Mexicans were allowed to assimilate earlier into a society that later had become the United States following the Mexican–American War.

== Urban settlement ==
Compared to the more rural migrants of the period 1910–1940, many African Americans in the South were already living in urban areas and had urban job skills before they relocated. They moved to take jobs in the burgeoning industrial cities in the North and West, including the defense industry during World War II. Workers who were limited to segregated, low-skilled jobs in some cities were able to get highly skilled, well-paid jobs at California, Oregon, and Washington shipyards.

By the end of the Second Great Migration, African Americans had become a highly urbanized population. More than 80% lived in cities, a greater proportion than among the rest of American society. 53% remained in the Southern United States, while 40% lived in the Northeast and North Central states and 7% in the West.

While African Americans were often relegated to support roles during World War II, often these roles could be exceedingly hazardous. An accidental munitions explosion at Port Chicago, California, claimed the lives of over 200 African-American sailors in 1944. Some sailors refused to resume work until conditions were made less hazardous. Up to 50 were imprisoned after a court martial convicted them of mutiny.

Further up the West Coast, high-paying shipbuilding war jobs attracted large numbers of African Americans into the small existing communities. Their numbers in Seattle, Washington, tripled; the numbers in Portland, Oregon, quadrupled. The newcomers became permanent residents, building up Black political influence, strengthening civil rights organizations such as the NAACP, calling for antidiscrimination legislation. On the negative side, racial tensions increased, both Black and White residential areas deteriorated from overcrowding, and inside the Black community there were angry words between "old settlers" and recent arrivals for leadership in the Black communities.

== Causes ==
Like participants in the Great Migration, those in the Second Great Migration were motivated to move for economic reasons. The economic deprivation suffered by southern African Americans prior to the Great Migration has been well documented. Plantation agriculture such as sharecropping limited African Americans to gain and work up the "agricultural ladder". The agricultural ladder was a system in which a worker's status determined their position, not how skilled or valuable they were. Because of segregation, African-American men were placed in agricultural jobs and women were placed in domestic services. These conditions had little to no change from the early decades of the twentieth century, which was a powerful incentive for African-American southerners to leave and go look for opportunity elsewhere.

The Agricultural Adjustment Act (AAA) of 1933 significantly influenced the Second Great Migration by reshaping the economic dynamics of the Southern United States. It was actually the cornerstone of President Franklin D. Roosevelt's New Deal, aimed at alleviating the economic hardships faced by American farmers during the Great Depression. Unfortunately things didn't go as planned. The act aimed to increase agricultural prices by reducing production, resulting in land consolidation and technological advancements that displaced a significant number of rural workers. The lack of opportunities in the agricultural sector, combined with ongoing racial segregation and discrimination, pushed African Americans to seek better prospects in Northern cities.

In the 1930s and 1940s, the introduction of the mechanical cotton picker and other forms of farm mechanization reduced the demand for field labor in southern agriculture, leading many African Americans to seek new jobs in urban areas. Migrating north and west out of the South was a way to improve their economic fortunes. World War II resulted in labor shortages due to millions of people enlisting or being drafted into active military service. As a result, northern and western employers began recruiting southern Blacks and Whites to keep up with the nation's demands for the war effort. Social factors such as educational opportunities, political disenfranchisement, and racial violence also drove migration.

== Urban spatial segregation ==
The rapid mobilization of resources and weapons during World War II prompted many African Americans to migrate to Northern and Western cities in search of jobs in the booming munitions industry. While the Northern Black communities such as Chicago and New York City were already well established from the first Great Migration, relocating to the West was a new destination for the migrants in places like the San Francisco Bay Area, Los Angeles, Portland, Phoenix, and the Puget Sound region in Washington. Once they arrived, they were met with a variety of factors that separated emerging migrant communities from White ones. This urban spatial segregation led to the creation of racially homogeneous areas in cities that saw large amounts of African-American migration. It is estimated that less than 1% of Los Angeles's 461,000 Black residents lived in communities without a Black majority in 1960, resulting in de facto segregation.

In order to exploit the poor financial situation many migrants were in, areas of low income housing were established in places city planners wanted them to live. For example, the South Side area of Chicago and the South Central region of Los Angeles were established as designated areas for African Americans as early as the 1920s and 1930s respectively. Working class Blacks were attracted by the low price of housing intentionally placed in order to encourage the concentration of minorities away from Whites. Freeways were often built with the isolation of racial communities in mind. They served to reinforce lines of segregation and further contributed to the isolation of racially homogeneous communities in racially diverse cities. The fear of racially motivated violence and discrimination also served to isolate communities of minorities as they sought collective security and nondiscriminatory treatment close to home. The limited amount of housing, combined with the upsurge of migrants during the Second Great Migration lead to severe overcrowding and housing shortages that contributed to increasingly low property values.

As property values within these communities plummeted, the middle class, mostly White residents of target areas evacuated en masse. This is a phenomenon known as white flight. The introduction of non-White residents into a traditionally White area, in this case, inner city neighborhoods, caused the rapid evacuation of Whites, usually to the suburbs. In this way, the common social trope of white suburbia and the racially diverse inner city came to be. It is currently estimated that over 70% of Blacks operating in a given metropolitan area live in the city center. Comparatively, only 30% of Whites operating within that same city live in the inner city. White flight was driven in part by the process of blockbusting. White property owners, fearful of minority groups, sold their homes to real estate agents at a low price, often due to the tactics of the real estate companies themselves. Agents would then encourage that the vacant properties be bought by Black families seeking respite from the overcrowded neighborhoods in which they were sequestered. When one Black family moved in, the White neighbors would immediately sell their homes to the waiting real estate companies, who would in turn sell to more Black people at a significant markup.

Another obstacle facing migrating Blacks were the discriminatory housing laws that were put in place to counteract progressive legislation following World War II. The 1963 Rumford Fair Housing Act that outlawed discrimination in housing was effectively nullified by California Proposition 14 in 1964. This legislation, sponsored by the California Real Estate Association and conservative state institutions, affirmed the property owner's right to refuse to sell, rent or lease their property based solely on race. The federal government immediately cut funding to California housing and both the California and United States Supreme Court declared Prop 14 unconstitutional. It was officially repealed by California Proposition 7 in 1974, but while it was in practice it contributed to the segregation of Black migrants and is cited as a direct cause of the Watts riots in 1965.

The effect of racially homogeneous communities composed largely of migrant Blacks that formed because of spatial segregation in destination cities was that they were largely influenced by the Southern culture they brought with them. The food, music and even the discriminatory White police presence in these neighborhoods were all imported to a certain extent from the collective experiences of the highly concentrated African-American migrants. Writers have often assumed that Southern migrants contributed disproportionately to changes in the African-American family in the inner city. However, census data for 1940 through 1990 show that these families actually exhibited more traditional family patterns – more children living with two parents, more ever-married women living with their spouses, and fewer never-married mothers.

== Statistics ==
Blacks as a % of the population by U.S. region (1900–1970)
Region	1900	1910	1920	1930	1940	1950	1960	1970
Northeast	1.8%	1.9%	2.3%	3.3%	3.8%	5.1%	6.8%	8.8%
Midwest	1.9%	1.8%	2.3%	3.3%	3.5%	5.0%	6.7%	8.1%
West	0.7%	0.7%	0.9%	1.0%	1.2%	2.9%	3.9%	4.9%
South	32.3%	29.8%	26.9%	24.7%	23.8%	21.7%	20.6%	19.0%

== See also ==
- Black Belt in the American South
- Great Migration (African American)
- Urban culture
- New Great Migration
- Hillbilly Highway
