= Mortgage discrimination =

Mortgage discrimination or mortgage lending discrimination is the practice of banks, governments, or other lending institutions denying loans to one or more groups of people primarily on the basis of race, ethnic origin, sex or religion.

Instances of mortgage discrimination occurred in United States inner city neighborhoods from the 1930s and there is evidence that the practice continues to a degree in the United States today. In the United States, banks practiced redlining or denial of financial services including banking or insurance to residents of areas based upon the racial or ethnic composition of those areas, either directly or through selectively raising prices. Prior to the passage of the 1974 Equal Credit Opportunity Act and Housing and Community Development Act, lenders and the U.S. federal government frequently and explicitly discriminated against female mortgage loan applicants.

== Background ==
African Americans and other minorities found it nearly impossible to secure mortgages for property located in redlined areas. The systematic denial of loans was a major contributor to the urban decay that plagued many American cities during this time period. Minorities who tried to buy homes continued to face direct discrimination from lending institutions into the late 1990s. The disparities are not simply due to differences in creditworthiness. With other factors held constant, rejection rates for Black and Hispanic applicants were about 1.6 times that for Whites in 1995.

Fairness in lending was improved by the Home Mortgage Disclosure Act, passed in 1975. It requires banks to disclose their lending practices in the communities they serve. In the 1970s, the private sector fight against mortgage discrimination began to be led by community development banks, such as ShoreBank in Chicago.

== Contemporary ==
Several class action mortgage discrimination claims have been filed against lenders across the country, alleging that those lenders disproportionately targeted minorities for high cost, high risk subprime lending, which has resulted in disproportionately higher rates of default and foreclosure for minority African American and Hispanic borrowers.

FHA loans, a federal mortgage program, went to the white majority and reached few minorities. In a study done in Syracuse, between 1996 and 2000, of the 2,169 FHA loans issued only 29 or 1.3 percent went to predominantly minority neighborhoods compared with 1,694 or 78.1 percent that went to white neighborhoods. Mortgage discrimination played a significant part in the real estate bubble that popped during the later part of 2008, it was found that minorities were disproportionately steered by lenders into subprime loans.

In 1993 President Bill Clinton made changes to the Community Reinvestment Act to make mortgages more obtainable for lower and lower-middle-class families. In 1993 the Federal Reserve Bank of Boston issued a report entitled "Closing the Gap: A Guide to Equal Opportunity Lending". The 30-page document was intended to serve as a guide to loan officers to help curb discriminatory lending "Closing the Gap", instructs banks to hire based upon diversity needs, sweeten the compensation structure for working with lower income applicants, encourages shifting high risk, low income applications to the sub prime market, by saying "the secondary market [Subprime Market] is willing to consider ratios above the standard 28/36", and "Lack of credit history should not be seen as a negative factor".

While, "Closing the Gap" was not an industry-wide mandate, it illustrates the efforts banks made to meet public pressure to overcome mortgage discrimination. Under the Clinton administration community organizers pressured banks to increase their loans to minorities. Karen Wegmann, the head of Wells Fargo's community development group in 1993 told the New York Times, "The atmosphere now is one of saying yes." The same New York Times article echoed "Closing the Gap", writing, "The banks have also modified some standards for credit approval. Many low-income people do not have credit-bureau files because they do not have credit cards. So lenders are accepting records of continuously paid utility bills as evidence of creditworthiness. Similarly, they will accept steady income from several employers instead of the length of time at one job."

Because of looser loan restrictions many people who did not qualify for a mortgage before now could own a home. The banks issued loans with teaser rates, knowing that when higher variable rates kicked in later the borrowers would not be able to meet their payments. As long as housing prices kept rising and borrowers could refinance easily, everyone appeared to be doing well.

Minorities willingly entered sub-prime mortgages in far greater numbers than whites and represented a disproportional percentage of foreclosures,

Recently, the NAACP has submitted a lawsuit concerning alleged injustices in the lending industry. An analysis, by N.Y.U.'s Furman Center for Real Estate and Urban Policy, illustrated stark racial differences between the New York City neighborhoods where subprime mortgages were common and those where they were rare. The 10 neighborhoods with the highest rates of mortgages from subprime lenders had black and Hispanic majorities, and the 10 areas with the lowest rates were mainly non-Hispanic white. The analysis showed that even when median income levels were comparable, home buyers in minority neighborhoods were more likely to get a loan from a subprime lender. Discrimination motivated by prejudice is contingent on the racial composition of neighborhoods where the loan is sought and the race of the applicant. Lending institutions have been shown to treat black and Latino mortgage applicants differently when buying homes in white neighborhoods than when buying homes in black neighborhoods. An example of this occurred in the 1960s and 1970s on the near northside of Chicago. Thousands of blacks, Latinos, and poor people were systematically dislocated and prevented from acquiring loans by realtors and lending institutions with the blessings of the city's urban renewal program.

A 2015 Measure of America study commissioned by the American Civil Liberties Union examined the likely effect of discriminatory lending leading up to the financial crisis on the racial wealth gap for the next generation, and found that, among families that owned homes, white households had started to rebound from the worst effects of the Great Recession while black households were still struggling to make up lost ground. The analysis projected that the racial wealth gap will be significantly greater in the next generation because of the differential impact of the Great Recession.

=== Reverse redlining ===
Reverse redlining is a term that was coined by Gregory D. Squires, a professor of Sociology and Public Policy and Public Administration at George Washington University. This phenomenon occurs when a lender or insurer particularly targets minority consumers, not to deny them loans or insurance, but rather to charge them more than would be charged to a similarly situated majority consumer, specifically marketing the most expensive and onerous loan products. These communities had largely been ignored by most lenders just a couple decades earlier. However these same financial institutions in the 2000s saw black communities as fertile ground for subprime mortgages. Wells Fargo for instance partnered with churches in black communities, where the pastor would deliver "wealth building" seminars in their sermons, and the bank would make a donation to the church in return for every new mortgage application. There was pressure on both sides, as working-class blacks wanted a part of the nation's home-owning trend.

A survey of two districts of similar incomes, one being largely white and the other largely black, found that branches in the black community offered largely subprime loans and almost no prime loans. Studies found out that high-income blacks were almost twice as likely to end up with subprime home-purchase mortgages as low-income whites. Loan officers were clearly aware that they were exploiting their customers, in some cases referring to blacks as "mud people" and to subprime lending as "ghetto loans". A lower savings rate and a distrust of banks stemming from a legacy of redlining may help explain why there are fewer branches in minority neighborhoods. In recent years while subprime loans were not sought out by borrowers, brokers and telemarketers actively pushed them. A majority of the loans were refinance transactions allowing homeowners to take cash out of their appreciating property or pay off credit card and other debt.

Several state attorneys general have begun investigating these practices which may violate fair lending laws, and the N.A.A.C.P. have filed a class-action lawsuit charging systematic racial discrimination by more than a dozen banks. These suits have met with some success.

==== Occupy Our Homes ====
Reverse redlining has been cited as justification for the Occupy Our Homes movement. In Occupy Our Homes, protesters camp out at a person's foreclosed home to gain concessions from the lender, such as a delay in eviction.

== Laws ==
=== Equal Credit Opportunity Act ===
Under the Equal Credit Opportunity Act ("ECOA"), a creditor may not discriminate against an applicant based on the applicant's race, color, or national origin "with respect to any aspect of a credit transaction", 15 U.S.C. § 1991.

=== Fair Housing Act ===
Under the Fair Housing Act ("FHA") (Title VIII of the Civil Rights Act of 1968), it is "unlawful for any person or other entity whose business includes engaging in residential real estate-related transactions to discriminate against any person in making available such a transaction, or in the terms or conditions of such a transaction, because of race, color, religion, sex, handicap, familial status, or national origin". 42 U.S.C. § 3605. Section 3605, although not specifically naming foreclosures, discrimination in "the manner in which a lending institution forecloses a dlinquent or defaulted mortgage note" falls under the realm of the "terms or conditions of such loan". Harper v. Union Savings Association, 429 F.Supp. 1254, 1258-59 (N.D. Ohio 1977). The Office of Fair Housing and Equal Opportunity is charged with administering and enforcing the Fair Housing Act. Any person who feels that they have faced lending discrimination can file a fair housing complaint.

=== FDIC ===
Consistent with many jurisdictions throughout the country, the Federal Deposit Insurance Corporation ("FDIC"), based in part on a study conducted by the Federal Reserve Bank of Boston, issued a "Policy Statement On Discrimination In Lending" on April 29, 2004, emphasizing the breadth of prohibitions on discriminatory conduct in lending under the ECOA and the FHA. The FDIC Policy Statement explained that "courts have recognized three methods of proof of lending discrimination under the ECOA and the FH Act", including: "Overt evidence of discrimination", when a lender blatantly discriminates on a prohibited basis; evidence of "disparate treatment", when a lender treats applicants differently based on one of the prohibited factors; and evidence of "disparate impact", when a lender applies a practice uniformly to all applicants but the practice has a discriminatory effect on a prohibited basis and is not justified by business necessity.

FDIC Policy Statement, p. 5399 (April 29, 2004).

=== Civil Rights Act of 1866 ===
The 1874 Revised Statutes of the United States and subsequent United States Code provide that "[a]ll citizens of the United States shall have the same right, in every State and Territory, as is enjoyed by white citizens thereof to inherit, purchase, lease, sell, hold, and convey real and personal property" This provision is based loosely on the Civil Rights Act of 1866.

== See also ==
- Black flight
- Home Mortgage Disclosure Act
- Office of Fair Housing and Equal Opportunity
- Racial steering
- Redlining
- Segregation
- White flight
