= Enclothed cognition =

Influence of clothing on the wearer's mind

Enclothed cognition is a psychological phenomenon where the clothing a person wears influences their thoughts, feelings, and behaviors. The term was coined by Hajo Adam and Adam D. Galinsky who exhibited the effects of clothing in a 2012 experiment that used white lab coats. They hypothesised that worn attire affects the wearer's psychological processes due to the activation of abstract concepts through its symbolic meaning.

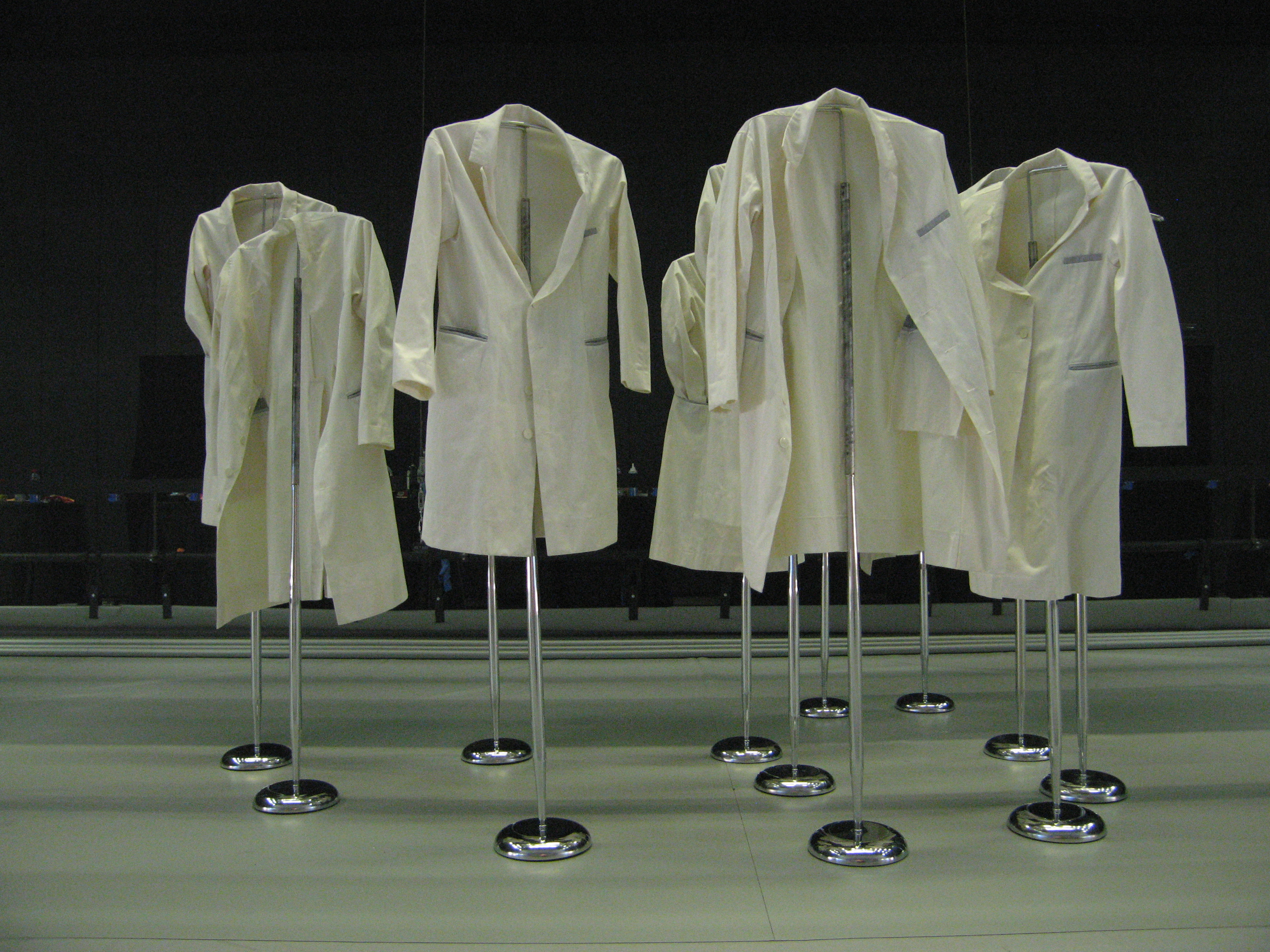
Lab coats

== Theory ==
Embodied or grounded cognition, is the process in which bodily actions such as cleaning or the decision to change posture, or changing one's perception of a certain aroma, temperature, influence one's subsequent judgment and behaviours. Embodied cognition is the basis for a link between an action's fitting metaphorical interpretation and the system of symbols guiding a person while reflecting the individual's selfhood, outlook on others, and/or notion about the world (for example, a feeling of power and significance). In the end, the results show that this social contagion influences not only the standpoints of the subject but as well as the standpoints and behaviour of the people around them.

The idea of embodied cognition is connected with enclothed cognition as the cognitive processes are controlled by the emotions and sensations linked to the body. The reflection of imaginations by real objects as abstract concepts, like putting on clothes which symbolize specific features or positions can affect a person's cognition and behavior. Noted that the symbolic meaning of is only realized once the individual embodied the clothes physically.

== Adam and Galinsky study ==
Prior to the experiment, a survey was carried out to see whether people associate attributes of attentiveness with white lab coats. The survey confirmed that participants linked attention-related characteristics to lab coats. Adam and Galinsky then hypothesised that the physical experience of wearing a lab coat and its symbolic meaning would enhance participant's performance on tasks that required high levels of attention. To test this hypothesis, a total of three experiments were executed.

=== First experiment ===
In their first experiment, 58 undergraduates with an average age of 20 were randomly assigned to two scenarios. Either wearing or not wearing a lab coat. Participants then completed a Stroop Test, where colour words are written in different colours, to measure selective attention. The first experiment consisted of 50 randomised trials with 20 being incongruent and 30 non-incongruent. Participants were asked to do this as fast as possible. This tested their selective attention abilities which is to concentrate on relevant stimuli while disregarding irrelevant stimuli. The results of this first experiment illustrated that participants wearing a lab coat made half as many errors than participants who wore their own clothing on incongruent trials. The amount of errors was the same in both groups on non-incongruent trials and there was no variation in the time completing the task in the different conditions. The experiment exhibited how physically wearing a lab coat can increase selective attention on a Stroop task.

=== Second experiment ===
The second experiment assessed the symbolic meaning of clothing. This experiment's aim was to demonstrate that both the physical wearing of clothing and its symbolic meaning are needed for enclothed cognition to appear. To convey this, different occupations were associated with the lab coats. One was a doctor's coat and the other, a painter's. The experiment tested sustained attention using a comparative visual search task. 74 undergraduates with an average age of 20 were randomly assigned to three different conditions in which one group wore a doctor's coat, another a painter's coat and one group wearing their own clothing while a doctor's coat was displayed in front of them. Before the experiment, participants in all three scenarios were asked to answer questions regarding the lab coat (i.e., how they perceived the coat in the context of different occupations). During the experiment, participants were asked to do four comparative visual search tasks where they had to find four small differences in two almost identical images as fast as possible. The results saw more differences found by the group wearing a doctor's coat, displaying greater sustained attention in comparison to the group wearing a painter's coat and the group having a lab coat displayed in front of them. The time participants needed to complete the task did not vary. This showed that results were from increased sustained attention obtained wearing lab coats and not due to levels of effort.

=== Third experiment ===
Experiment two brought into question whether wearing the lab coat really caused an increase in sustained attention or if the reason was through establishing a connection between oneself and the coat. This divided the concurrent hypothesis posed by Adam and Galinsky. Studies on behavioural priming propose that being exposed to a doctor's coat should have resulted in increased sustained attention for group three similar to that of group one. Results of the second experiment indicated that sustained attention differed between the group wearing a doctor's coat and the group having the coat displayed in front of them. The third group saw the doctor's lab coat only when they entered the laboratory, but not during the rest of the experiment. Adam and Galinsky hypothesised that this absence of the priming effect may be due to the lack of exposure of the coat. As the physical wearing of clothing is a fundamental component in Adam and Galinsky's hypothesis, they included an altered condition in the third experiment to demonstrate its significance. 99 undergraduate students participated and were randomly assigned to one of three scenarios of either wearing a doctor's coat, a painter's coat or writing about how they identified with the coat without wearing it. They were asked to repeat the same task from experiment 2 to examine their sustained attention. Results indicated that the group wearing a doctor's lab coat found more differences than the group who wrote about the coat whilst the group wearing a painter's coat performed worst. The result of the third experiment was the final evidence needed to effectively exhibit the enclothed cognition hypothesis.

=== Results ===
Adam and Galinsky's research on enclothed cognition illustrate the effects of the physical experience of wearing clothing as well as its symbolic meaning on the wearer's psychological processes. The first experiment showed that participants wearing a lab coat had higher selective attention than people wearing their own clothing. The second and third experiment displayed strong evidence that enclothed cognition significantly depends on both wearing and the symbolic meaning of a piece of clothing. Sustained attention only increased when participants were told they were wearing a doctor's coat. Therefore, Adam and Galinsky concluded that the principle of enclothed cognition relies on the co-occurrence of two independent variables, physically wearing clothing and its symbolic meaning.

== Other studies ==
The concept of enclothed cognition has been further investigated and applied to various different domains. Following the line of lab coat, the effect of formal clothing on cognition, such as abstract processing was measured. Abstract processing consists of superordinate, holistic, and broad mental representations and wearing formal clothes is related to this. Using Navon task, study also demonstrated that formal clothes improved global perceptual processing. There is also one study that intends to investigate one step further into the positive correlation between the formality of clothes and mental abstraction. More recent study demonstrate that wearing formal clothes can trigger self-controlled and organized images, leading people to choose healthy food as this is congruent with their associations. Kraus and Mendes compared participants in upper-class clothes (business-suit) and lower-class clothes (sweatpants) using negotiation profits and testosterone level as hormone related to dominance. They suggested that wearing upper class clothes is associated with sartorial symbols lead to higher self-benefiting behavior and significantly higher testosterone.

What uniform and occupation-related clothes a person puts on has a role in determining people's reaction and cognitive prowess. The clothes of nursing tunic were linked to higher levels of empathic concern and more salient compared to the same tunic described as a cleaner or merely identified, aligned with the original study. Similarly, red cross uniform was used to compared with military uniform to demonstrate prosocial behaviors in a task involving electric shocks. Results showed that wearing red cross uniform led to more prosocial behaviours and more neural empathic responses. Existing studies demonstrated that police uniforms could potentially related to bias intern of social attention and reaction. For example, Civile and Obhi suggested that students wearing police uniform had their attention drawn significantly less toward someone in suit (represent high socio-economic status) than someone in a hoodie (represent low socio-economic status)compare to student wearing mechanic's uniform. Participants wearing a police uniform are also more likely to shoot unarmed targets.

By wearing additional clothes, human cognitive processes could be affected. Existing study suggested that wearing bicycle helmets compared to wearing baseball caps would cause the participants to score higher in risk taking and sensation seeking. Furthermore, a watch as a fashion accessory is associated with higher levels of conscientiousness and punctuality. Wearing counterfeit products has been shown to increases likelihood of behaving dishonestly and judging others as unethical as well as make individuals feel less authentic.

The concepts of enclothed cognition have practical applications in many areas and provide insight into solving societal problems. One example is a Japanese study, which found that pink clothes are associated with stronger egalitarian sex-role attitudes and weaker benevolent sexism than blue clothes, suggesting wearing pink clothing for men is a possible means to combat gender stereotypes and traditional sex-role perceptions. Also, in White et al., children who dressed up as positive characters such as Batman spent more time on repetitive tasks than children without customers, as these outfits are associated with strength and perseverance.

== Criticisms ==
Although enclothed cognition study is based on multitude of theoretical and empirical evidence, it is also challenged by some opponents. Others scientists argue that reproduction of findings is a limited issue which must be supplemented with more cases. Replication failures had appeared in multiple studies using similar measures but different participants, with failed replication including the links between student interest in science and wearing the lab coat, individual differences in working memory capacity and wearing lab coat and sustained attention and lab coat and/or glasses. One study using larger but similar sample size and same preregistered methodology with the original study also failed to replicate the effect of enclothed cognition on the Stroop test challenged the validity of the theory.

In response to this, Adam and Galinsky published another paper in 2019 acknowledging the direct public replication as sensible but conclude that key principle of enclothed cognition (clothing can impact how wearer thinks, feels and acts) is valid overall. Because the majority of papers showed aligned or partially aligned findings. They also mentioned the potential of publication bias as a threat of validity.

The most recent meta-analysis of enclothed cognition uses the Z-curve, a method to estimate distributions of significant effects and detect the possibility of publication bias or p-hacking. The study concluded that although studies conducted before 2015 lacked replicability, evidential value can be affirmed after 2015.

The topic needs more investigation to reveal underlying mechanisms and limitations in the application of the enclothed cognition. In the research answers are sought to the questions regarding methodological limitations and multiple gaps in the theory.
