= Ethnic succession theory =

Theory in sociology

Ethnic succession theory is a theory in sociology stating that ethnic and racial groups entering a new area may settle in older neighborhoods or urban areas until achieving economic parity with certain economic classes. The concept of succession is well established in "both ecological and economic models of urban residential change." As the newer group becomes economically successful, it moves to a better residential area. With continued immigration, a new ethnic group will settle in the older neighborhood in a similar starting situation. This pattern will continue, creating a succession of groups moving through the neighborhood (and city) over time. Ethnic succession has taken place in most major United States cities, but is most well known in New York City, where this process has been observed since the 19th century.

== Explanations ==
=== Immigration and environment ===
Because of the United States' continued attraction for immigrants, its cities have been sources of study for scholars of urban development and ethnic succession. Ethnic groups often settle together in urban neighborhoods as part of a "chain of immigration" to a new country, or migration to a new region, to keep personal networks, languages, foods, religions and cultures alive. They may be viewed by the dominant racial or cultural group as undesirable neighbors because of prejudice against a new culture's dominating a neighborhood. People with entry-level skills and/or limited language skills often have settled in older areas, where they can afford the housing and entry-level jobs. Over time, the incoming group members find work, and members are able to establish themselves economically. The group rises in status with its economic achievements. The first, more established group tends to move out in the face of new arrivals, as it tends to have the economic resources to do so. The neighborhood takes on new demographics.

Since the late twentieth century, more people in the United States live in suburbs than in center cities. Ethnic succession has also been observed taking place in suburbs, with newer groups settling in older suburbs, and more established groups' moving to newer developments. Many well-educated Indian and Nigerian immigrants, who could afford good housing, have settled immediately in better suburbs rather than in cities.

=== Segregation ===
Segregation has played a major part in the limitations on socioeconomic ascension of an ethnic group, whether by self-selection in settlement together or pressure to be confined by a majority group. In some cases, immigrants have been limited to small areas of rundown housing which they could afford. After reaching economic parity, high-income earners of a traditional low-status group may still not achieve integration in the majority culture. Some suburbs of cities have come to be dominated by different ethnic and cultural groups.

Often economic class is a factor equally important as race. Mary Pattillo-McCoy provides an example from her studies of South Chicago in the 1990s. Although middle-class blacks moved out of their original neighborhoods, they settled in predominantly black neighborhoods, not venturing too far from their first, lower-class neighborhood. She studied Groveland, a middle-class enclave between poorer black areas and white suburbs. Although gaining the middle class, she found some African Americans were underemployed because of persistent discrimination. Living closer to lower-income neighborhoods put them and their children at risk of higher crime, poverty-related drugs and dysfunction, and problems in public schools.

== Historical examples ==
=== East End of London ===
The East End of London has seen a succession of poor migrants from rural areas, as well as immigrant populations, who for centuries arrived as refugees from warfare on the Continent. For instance, in the 17th and 18th century, the area had many French Huguenot (Protestant) refugees, who managed the silk-weaving industry. At its peak in the mid-18th century, 12,000 silk weavers were employed in the Spitalfields area. In 1742 they built a church, La Neuve Eglise. Later it became used as a Methodist chapel to serve mostly poor East Enders from around England. Although in the 17th century, the East End also had Sephardic Jewish immigrants, it was not until the concentration of 19th-century Ashkenazi Jewish immigration from eastern Europe, that the Methodist chapel was adapted as the Machzikei HaDath, or Spitalfields Great Synagogue; it was consecrated in 1898. By the 1870s, thousands of unskilled Jewish immigrants were garment workers in sweatshops. Descendants of Jewish immigrants became educated, took better jobs, and gradually moved on to other parts of London and its suburbs, and new immigrants settled in the area. Since 1976, the synagogue was converted to the Jamme Masjid mosque, which serves the local ethnic Bangladeshi population, who are Muslim.

== U.S. cities ==
Most major American cities have historically had forms of ethnic succession, from the earliest years of colonial settlement, to recent times with newer immigrants altering city demographics. What is generally known are the successions as a result of the waves of immigration from eastern and southern Europe of the late nineteenth and early twentieth centuries, and the Great Migration of African Americans from the South to the North. Since changes to immigration laws in the 1960s, there have been new ethnic successions with the arrival of immigrants from Mexico, Central and South America; Africa and Asia. In addition, industrial restructuring and major economic changes upended the economies of cities throughout the Rust Belt, with implications for ethnic succession. In addition, there has been increased population movement to the South and Southwest over recent decades, causing shifts in population and voting patterns across the country.

=== St Louis, Chicago, Cleveland, and Detroit ===
Ethnic succession has been studied in these four cities of the Midwest, which had dramatic growth in the late nineteenth and early twentieth centuries, fueled by industrialization, commodity resources, shipping traffic, and the automobile industry. From World War I through the 1930s, many African Americans moved to northern and midwestern cities in the first wave of the Great Migration. In addition, each of these cities received in total millions of immigrants from southern and eastern Europe. Both the new immigrants and blacks competed with contemporary working class groups for housing and jobs. In Chicago, for example, ethnic Irish had become well established since the immigration of the mid-nineteenth century, and its members violently defended the physical boundaries of its neighborhoods, and its control of local working-class jobs. Similar issues prevailed in St. Louis, but the major nineteenth-century immigration had been by Germans. In both cases, the earlier ethnic groups resisted and tried to dominate the later ones, leading to outbreaks of violence in some cases. Tensions fueled by labor competition and post-World War I social tensions caused race riots, with ethnic whites, especially of Irish descent, attacking blacks during the summer of 1919 in Chicago. East St. Louis had a similar riot in 1917 that erupted after a strike.

=== White flight ===
In the United States, ethnic succession has been seen both among Europeans groups and between European-American and other ethnic groups. By the late nineteenth century, some cities were served by commuter railroads and trolley public transportation, which made longer commutes to work easier. The wealthiest people were the first to move out to new suburban developments. Such new transportation systems stimulated residential real estate development in train and trolley suburbs, and people who could afford to move out of the inner cities started to do so.

At the same time, major northern and midwestern cities were being crowded by two major groups: immigrants from southern and eastern Europe, and African Americans from the rural South. With federally subsidized highway construction after World War II, residential suburban development was stimulated and working middle-class white people began to leave the cities - often the children of immigrants. They were replaced, or sometimes moved away from competing for housing, by newer groups of both migrants and immigrants. People described the suburban migration as "white flight", because newer populations happened to be ethnic groups of color. Today's suburbs are more diverse, as ethnic groups of color have also moved to the suburbs when they could afford to. Other ethnic groups have occupied older, lower quality housing in the cities. Some cities also maintain residential areas of high-value housing, occupied by upper classes of various ethnic groups.

=== Los Angeles ===
During the early 1990s, numerous Hispanic immigrants, primarily from Mexico, increased their rate of settlement in South Central Los Angeles. It had historically been mostly African American from the Great Migration beginning in the early 1940s. In 1980 Los Angeles was 28% Hispanic, 48% non-Hispanic white, and 17% black. By 1990 it was 40% Hispanic, 37% non-Hispanic white, and 13% black. This extremely rapid change in racial dynamics resulted in much social tension and some outbreaks of violence between groups. Such violence occurred in Watts.

== Current research ==
=== Immigrant enterprises ===
Ethnic succession has been seen in the immigrant-dominated garment industry in New York since the turn of the 20th century. Ethnicity among entrepreneurs and workers continues to be an important determinant in maintaining the industry in New York against global competition. Bernard Wong's 1987 study of Chinese-owned factories noted that common ethnicity allowed the mobilization of capital and labor, and reduced management/labor conflict.

Margaret Chin's book, Sewing Women (1998, 2005), examines how immigration, ethnicity and gender dynamics affect the contemporary garment industry. Also, Chin stresses the effect of unionization. She examines how ethnicity succession offers economic opportunities for immigrants, while limiting options for rising social mobility. The garment industry has long been immigrant-dominated, specifically in New York City. From Jewish immigrants in the early 1900s, to later 20th-century domination by Chinese owners and workers, to Hispanic workers under Korean owners today, the industry has been dominated by low skill, cheap labor, and poor working conditions. These conditions are typical of many jobs taken by immigrants without language skills in the larger cultures.

Chin contrasts aspects of the industry and employer-employee relations of Chinese-owned garment factories in Chinatown and Korean-owned factories outside the Korean enclave. She concludes that within the ethnic enclave, workers are more limited to low wages by familial and community relations. By contrast, Hispanics working for Korean owners may gain higher market wages, but be limited from advancing to supervisory positions by belonging to a different ethnicity than owners.

=== New York City planning ===
The researcher Ronald J.O. Flores, along with A.P. Lobo and J.J. Salvo of the New York City Department of Planning, have noticed since 1970 increasing succession among various Hispanic nationalities in residential neighborhoods in New York. Since about 1970, Hispanic ethnic groups have predominated among immigrants entering inner-city neighborhoods of New York City, succeeding whites of European ancestries. Puerto Ricans and Dominicans tended to settle in their own ethnic neighborhoods, perhaps because of a concentration of numbers. Immigrants from a variety of South American nations have integrated more in multi-ethnic neighborhoods. In the 21st century, numerous national groups of South American Hispanic ethnicity have begun to succeed the Puerto Ricans and Dominicans in some areas, creating the first Hispanic succession in the city.
