= Legacy costs =

Legacy costs is a term formed by analogy with the computer industry's legacy systems. Legacy costs are those incurred by an organization (whether corporation or city) in prior years under different leadership or when the entity's priorities and resources were different. While it can refer to other commitments (particularly existing infrastructure) as well, it primarily refers to obligations to pay health care costs and pensions under defined-benefit plans for current employees and retirees, usually incurred during the labor peace era after World War II. Legacy costs are believed to hinder American jobs, such as auto manufacturers and central cities, and older airlines worldwide. This belief leads to the idea that legacy costs will lower the company's competitiveness. Organized labor sees such criticisms as part of a desire to abandon any form of social contract between worker and employer.

Newer, less-established entities have few or no problems with legacy costs, because they have less pension and health care liabilities (this applies to new suburbs, for example, as well as new companies), and are therefore able to out-compete (in some cases) the older entities.

== History ==
In the 1990s, steel firms were guaranteed pension funds. Workers had health-care benefits through these steel firms; however, there was an issue in funding for the defined benefit pension funds. In 1986, PBGC took over LTV's pension payments after LTV went bankrupt. The main apprehension was the liabilities between the firms with defined benefit plans and the firms with contribution pension plans. After this problem, many workers believed that the old firms had to pay the costs of the pensions, also known as legacy costs.

The Lincoln Institute of Land Policy has conducted research on how much money is spent on pension plans from state and local government in their published 2012 findings. This research used records from Boston College Center for Retirement Research with a Public Plans Database (PPD). The information needed to be counted for the calculation are age and salary histories of members, retirement ages, asset earnings, etc. From this article's database, researchers came to the conclusion that pensions are underfunded because governments do not plan enough funds to insure liabilities expenses in that year.
