= New Great Migration =

Demographic change in the US since 1970

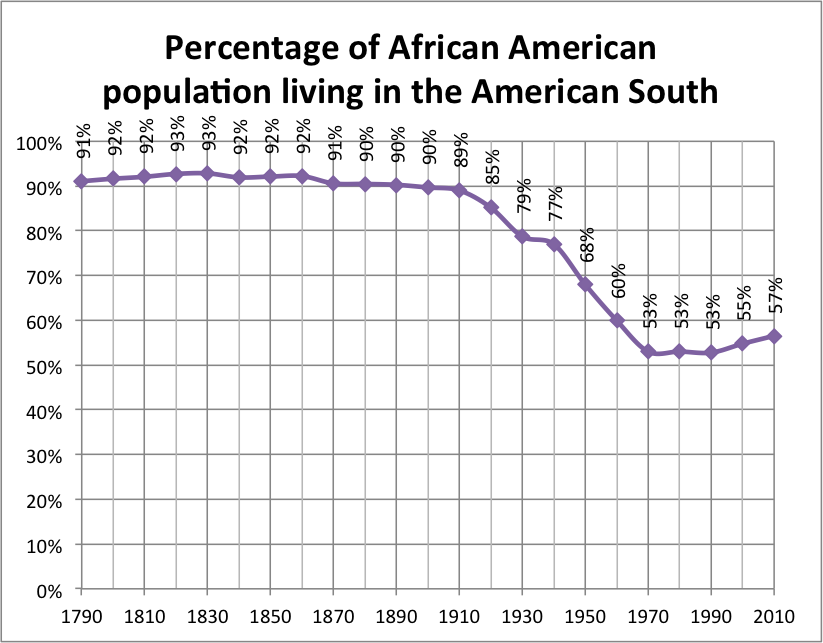
Graph showing the percentage of the African American population living in the American South, 1790–2010.

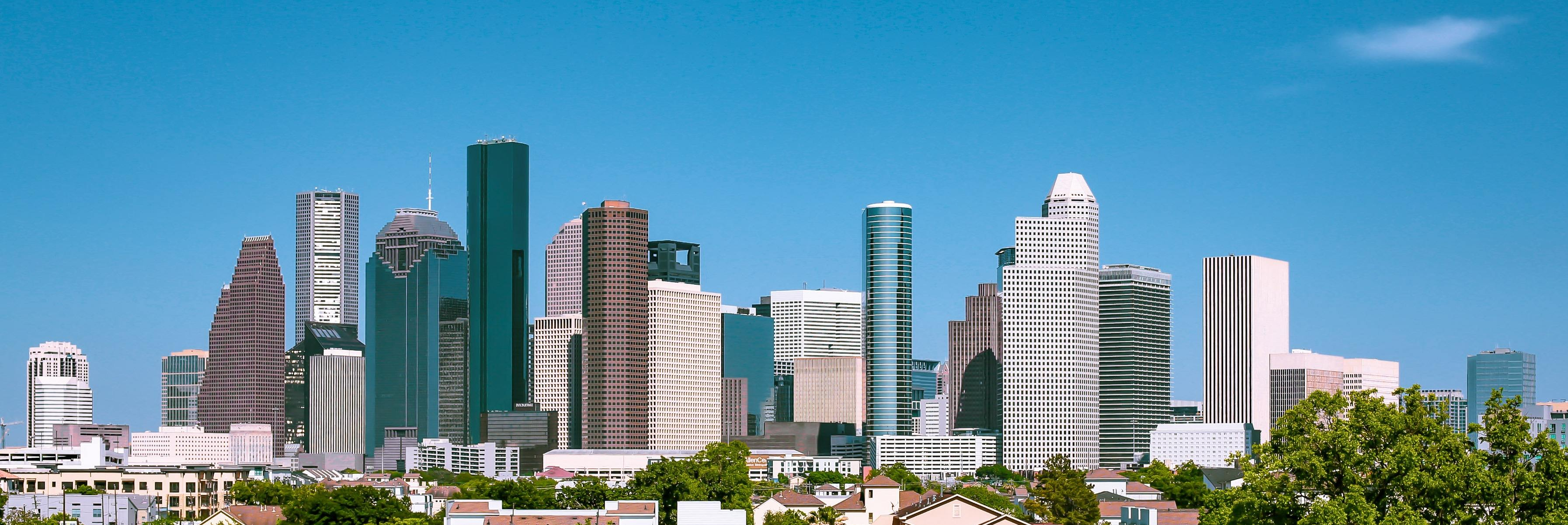
Houston has one of the fastest growing black populations in the United States.

The New Great Migration is the demographic change from 1970 to the present, which is a reversal of the previous 60-year trend of black migration within the United States.

Since 1970, deindustrialization of cities in the Northeastern and Midwestern United States, growth of jobs in the "New South" with lower costs of living, desire to reunite with family, cultural ties, lessening discrimination and religious connections have all acted to attract African Americans to the Southern United States in substantial numbers. Between 1965 and 1970 around 287,000 African Americans left the Southern United States, while from 1975 to 1980, it is estimated 109,000 African Americans migrated to the Southern United States, showing the reversal of the original Great Migration. Between 1975 and 1980, several Southern states saw net African American migration gains.

In 2014, African American millennials moved in the highest numbers to Texas, Georgia, Florida, and North Carolina. African American populations have continued to drop throughout much of the Northeast, especially from the state of New York and from northern New Jersey, as they rise in the South. In Massachusetts, even though the black population saw a net increase between 2010 and 2020, the Greater Boston area lost approximately 8,800 black residents and Massachusetts lost an average of 11,700 black residents per year from 2015 to 2020, with approximately half moving to Southern states and Georgia and Florida being the most popular destinations.

African Americans are also moving to the suburbs.

Fort Worth, San Antonio, Columbus, Houston, Jacksonville and Charlotte saw the largest growth in the black population.

African Americans are also moving back to New Orleans and Louisiana.

== Demographic shifts ==
College graduates and middle-class migrants make up a major portion of the new migration. For instance, from 1965 to 2000, the states of Florida, Georgia, and Texas attracted the most black college graduates. The only state outside the former Confederate States that attracted a sizeable migration of black college graduates was Maryland, most of the population growth being in the counties surrounding Washington, D.C. In that same period, California was a net loser of black migration for the first time in three decades. While the migration is still in progress, much data is from this 35-year period.

The New Great Migration is not evenly distributed throughout the South. As with the earlier Great Migration, the New Great Migration is primarily directed toward cities and large urban areas, especially those who are more progressive and were not the major battlefields of the Civil Rights Era. Such urban areas include Atlanta, Charlotte, Houston, Dallas, Raleigh, Washington, D.C., Tampa, Virginia Beach, San Antonio, Memphis, Orlando, Nashville, Jacksonville, and so forth. North Carolina's Charlotte metro area in particular, is a hot spot for African American migrants in the US. Between 1975 and 1980, Charlotte saw a net gain of 2,725 African Americans in the area. This number continued to rise as between 1985 and 1990 as the area had a net gain of 7,497 African Americans, and from 1995 to 2000 the net gain was 23,313 African Americans. This rise in net gain points to Atlanta, Charlotte, Dallas, and Houston being a growing hot spots for the migrants of The New Great Migration. The percentage of Black Americans who live in the South has been increasing since 1990, and the biggest gains have been in the region's large urban areas, according to census data. The Black population of metro Atlanta more than doubled between 1990 and 2020, surpassing 2 million in the most recent census. The Black population also more than doubled in metro Charlotte while Greater Houston and Dallas-Fort Worth both saw their Black populations surpass 1 million for the first time. Several smaller metro areas also saw sizable gains, including San Antonio; Raleigh and Greensboro, N.C.; and Orlando. Primary destinations are states that have the most job opportunities, especially Georgia, North Carolina, Maryland, Virginia, Tennessee, Florida and Texas. Other southern states, including Mississippi, Louisiana, South Carolina, Alabama and Arkansas, have seen little net growth in the African American population from return migration.

=== Gentrification and migration flows ===
The most populated cities that house millions of African Americans and employ many more, including New York City, Chicago, Detroit, Los Angeles, and Philadelphia, have undergone disproportionate residential evictions and measured gentrification that has moved African Americans to affordable suburbia. According to Census Data from 2015-2018, zip codes with higher African American and Latino populations were considered concentrated centers of eviction, and their displacement was a result of severe socioeconomic inequality. Most notably, cities, like Philadelphia, which were once a sacred refuge for African Americans as part of the Great Migration, feature gentrified African American populations that are forced to move to less advantaged non-gentrifying neighborhoods nearby. Additionally, the African Americans that move out of a city completely due to gentrification, are significantly more disadvantaged than their Non-Black counterparts who do the same. Population movement to the outer rings of cities and nearby suburbia aligns with Black Flight.

Since 2018, the annual estimates of growth rates for metropolitan and non-metropolitan areas in the US Census have shown that major metropolitan areas, with a population of over 1 million people, have a growth rate significantly lower than minor metropolitan areas. Updated rates in the 2022-2023 year publicized a differential of .2 between metropolitan areas (.68) and minor metropolitan areas (.46) on a 1.0 scale. A decade prior in 2011–2012, the positions were superimposed with metropolitan areas at a near peak (.96) and minor metropolitan areas (.67) being relatively similar to their present position. In the 2020s, Atlanta, Charlotte Dallas, Houston, Raleigh, and San Antonio are among the major metropolitan areas with the highest annual growth rates. New York, NY, Los Angeles, California, and Chicago, Illinois are in the lower 10th percentile. On average in the last 13 years, the urban cores of northern major metropolitan areas exhibited a consistently negative growth trend – except a sharp decline and rebounding growth for the 2019–2022 pandemic era. Additionally, the outer suburbs of major metropolitan cities have the highest annual growth rates for its domestic population compared to immigrating populations and inner suburb populations, meaning native citizens of major metropolitan areas are actively migrating to affordable areas nearby.

Despite communities of color moving to the suburbs and outer rings of cities, the frequency and intensity of black-white segregation experienced by these groups have varied insignificantly since 2000 per 2010 census data. While some of the largest southern counties with significant black populations display persistent segregation like Tarrant County, Texas, others like Fulton County, Georgia have improved since 2000. In the 2013 - 2017 period, black-white segregation dropped more points on the measured index for nearly all metropolitan cities with 45 of 51 indicating a decline. The Northeast displayed the heaviest concentration of highly segregated major metropolitan areas. When virtually exclusively white neighborhoods diversified, segregation and isolation for minority groups grew in other neighborhoods, which has prevented segregation distributions from taking substantial point reductions. Integration of exclusively white neighborhoods is proven to be crucial for equitable distribution of economic and educational resources.

For Black or African American citizens in all public work sectors of the North American Industry Classification System, Georgia, Florida, and Texas saw the most consistent job hires and growth from Q1, 2011 to Q4 2018. Among those states, steady-income jobs, such as administrative services and healthcare are trending employment options for African Americans in Generation Y and Z. Relative to state population increases and decreases between 2010 and 2020, Texas, Georgia, and Florida were the states with the greatest mass migration regardless of population percentage. Migration flow between regions from 2006 - 2019 showed that the South persistently gained the most citizens from domestic inter-regional movers; notable state-level migration flows involved California, Texas, Florida, and New York.

=== Religion ===
Religion has been suggested to be one of the causes of the New Great Migration. Many migrants of the New Great Migration try to find a "sign of God" about moving, and even those coming for job reasons will use faith to manage the feelings of uncertainty that come with moving to another state. Some migrants move to get more connected to their faith and see the move as a "spiritual journey", as the Southern states (often called the Bible Belt) have a large number of churches and a heavy connection to Protestant Christianity.

== See also ==
- Black Belt in the American South
- Black flight

=== By city ===
- African Americans in Atlanta
- History of African Americans in Baltimore
- History of African Americans in Boston
- History of African Americans in Dallas–Fort Worth
- History of African Americans in Houston
- History of African Americans in Jacksonville
- History of African Americans in San Antonio

=== By state ===
- African Americans in Alabama
- African Americans in Florida
- African Americans in Georgia
- African Americans in Louisiana
- African Americans in Maryland
- African Americans in Mississippi
- African Americans in North Carolina
- African Americans in South Carolina
- African Americans in Tennessee
- History of African Americans in Texas
- African Americans in Virginia
