= Demographics of Houston =

- Population pyramid of Houston in 2021
- Population: 2,304,580 (2020)

In the U.S. state of Texas, Houston is the largest city by both population and area. With a 1850 United States census population of 2,396—and 596,163 a century later, in 1950—Houston's population has experienced positive growth trends. In 2000, the city had a population of 1,953,631 people in 717,945 households and 457,330 families, increasing to 2,304,580 at the 2020 census.

In common with most U.S. communities leading up to the 20th and 21st centuries, Houston was a predominantly non-Hispanic white city. Since the New Great Migration and immigration from Latin America, Africa, and Asia during the latter half of the 20th century, the city has become a majority-minority city with Hispanic and Latino Americans constituting the plurality at 44% of the population. According to Los Angeles Times and NPR in 2017 and 2013, Houston has been described as the most diverse place in the United States.

Houston's racial and economic division can be observed in the socioeconomic phenomenon known as the Houston Arrow, an area of increased affluence relative to the rest of the city.

== Race and ethnicity ==
Historical population
| Year | Pop. | ±% p.a. |
|---|---|---|
| 1850 | 2,396 | — |
| 1860 | 4,845 | +7.30% |
| 1870 | 9,332 | +6.77% |
| 1880 | 16,513 | +5.87% |
| 1890 | 27,557 | +5.25% |
| 1900 | 44,633 | +4.94% |
| 1910 | 78,800 | +5.85% |
| 1920 | 138,276 | +5.78% |
| 1930 | 292,352 | +7.77% |
| 1940 | 384,514 | +2.78% |
| 1950 | 596,163 | +4.48% |
| 1960 | 938,219 | +4.64% |
| 1970 | 1,232,802 | +2.77% |
| 1980 | 1,595,138 | +2.61% |
| 1990 | 1,630,553 | +0.22% |
| 2000 | 1,953,631 | +1.82% |
| 2010 | 2,099,451 | +0.72% |
| 2020 | 2,304,580 | +0.94% |

| Racial and ethnic composition | 2020 | 2010 | 2000 | 1990 | 1970 |
|---|---|---|---|---|---|
| Hispanic or Latino (of any race) | 47.0% | 43.8% | 37.4% | 27.6% | 11.3% |
| Black or African American | 25.1% | 24.7% | 25.3% | 28.1% | 25.7% |
| Whites (Non-Hispanic) | 23.7% | 25.6% | 30.8% | 40.6% | 62.4% |
| Asian | 7.2% | 6.0% | 5.3% | 4.1% | 0.4% |

Houston city, Texas – Racial and ethnic composition Note: the US Census treats Hispanic/Latino as an ethnic category. This table excludes Latinos from the racial categories and assigns them to a separate category. Hispanics/Latinos may be of any race.
| Race / Ethnicity (NH = Non-Hispanic) | Pop 2000 | Pop 2010 | Pop 2020 | % 2000 | % 2010 | % 2020 |
|---|---|---|---|---|---|---|
| White alone (NH) | 601,851 | 537,901 | 545,989 | 30.81% | 25.62% | 23.69% |
| Black or African American alone (NH) | 487,851 | 485,956 | 509,479 | 24.97% | 23.15% | 22.11% |
| Native American or Alaska Native alone (NH) | 3,234 | 3,528 | 3,669 | 0.17% | 0.17% | 0.16% |
| Asian alone (NH) | 102,706 | 124,859 | 165,189 | 5.26% | 5.95% | 7.17% |
| Native Hawaiian or Pacific Islander alone (NH) | 680 | 711 | 960 | 0.03% | 0.03% | 0.04% |
| Other race alone (NH) | 2,614 | 4,128 | 11,884 | 0.13% | 0.20% | 0.52% |
| Mixed race or Multiracial (NH) | 23,830 | 22,700 | 53,987 | 1.22% | 1.08% | 2.34% |
| Hispanic or Latino (any race) | 730,865 | 919,668 | 1,013,423 | 37.41% | 43.81% | 43.97% |
| Total | 1,953,631 | 2,099,451 | 2,304,580 | 100.00% | 100.00% | 100.00% |

=== White non-Hispanic and European Americans ===
White Americans of northern and western European origin—particularly those of German and British origins—founded the city of Houston. Historically in the mid-nineteenth century, Southern Anglo settlers primarily from the southeastern United States crossed the Mississippi River, migrating to Texas. Roberto R. Treviño, author of The Church in the Barrio: Mexican American Ethno-Catholicism in Houston, said that German Americans "historically played a central role in Houston, far outnumbering other whites such as the British, Irish, Canadians, French, Czechs, Poles, and Scandinavian groups who historically have comprised a smaller part of the city's ethnic mosaic."

In 1910, prior to new waves of immigration from eastern and southern Europe, descendants of ethnic whites who had founded Houston numerically outnumbered other ethnic groups who had later settled in Houston. After European immigrants and their descendants assimilated into United States culture, they tended to develop with the city of Houston. Demographics at mid-century reflected a white majority, with Latino (mostly Mexican American) and African American minorities. The state legislature had disfranchised most blacks at the turn of the century and in practice, erected barriers to Hispanic-Latino voting as well.

After the civil rights movement gained some successes—such as congressional passage of the Civil Rights Act of 1964 and Voting Rights Act of 1965 to enforce minority constitutional rights—in the 1970s, white flight occurred in Houston as wealthier people moved to newer housing in suburbs, also choosing to avoid the mandated economic and racial integration of public schools in the city. The effects of the non-Hispanic white exodus were partly mitigated due to the policy of the city government to annex neighboring areas where non-Hispanic whites had moved. Between the 1970–1971 and the 1971–1972 school years, enrollment at the Houston Independent School District decreased by 16,000. They were overwhelmingly ethnic whites; 700 Black and African American students left the system.

As the suburbs developed and Texas enjoyed the 1970s oil boom, many non-Hispanic whites settled directly in established suburbs as they lacked any ties to inner city Houston. In 2004, 33% of non-Hispanic whites residing in Harris County originated from the Houston area, either by birth or from growing up there as children.

Demographers Max Beauregard and Karl Eschbach, both of University of Houston Center for Public Policy, concluded from their analysis of the 2000 U.S. census that white flight from the city continued to occur in the 1990s. In the decade prior to the 2000 census, white non-Hispanic residents left neighborhoods within Houston such as Alief, Aldine, Fondren Southwest, Gulfton, and Sharpstown as well as Inwood Forest, Northline, Northside, and Spring Branch while neighborhoods such as Clear Lake City and Kingwood experienced non-Hispanic white population growth.

=== Hispanic and Latino Americans ===
The Hispanic and Latino American population in Houston has been increasing as more immigrants from Latin American countries come to work in the area, although several Hispanic and Latino communities existed in Houston since the 1800s. As of 2020, Houston had the 3rd-largest Hispanic-Latino population in the United States. In 2011, Karl Eschbach, a University of Texas Medical Branch demographer, said that the number of illegal immigrants in the Houston area was estimated at 400,000, with over 70% being of Mexican descent.

As of 2011, the city had 44% Hispanic and Latino Americans and of the city's U.S. citizens that are Hispanic-Latino, half are at voting age or older. Many Hispanics and Latinos in Houston are not U.S. citizens, especially those living in Gulfton and Spring Branch. As a result, Hispanic and Latino Americans have proportionally less representation in the municipal government than other ethnic groups. As of April 2011 two of the Houston City Council members were Hispanic-Latino, making up 18% of the council.

As of 2010, Strait and Gong, authors of "Ethnic Diversity in Houston, Texas: The Evolution of Residential Segregation in the Bayou City, 1990–2000," stated that Hispanics and Latinos had "intermediate levels of segregation" from non-Hispanic whites.

In the early 1980s, there were 300,000 native Hispanics and Latinos, and an estimated 80,000 illegal immigrants from Mexico in Houston.

In 1985, Harris County had about 500,000 Hispanics and Latinos. Eschbach said that, historically, this population resided in specific neighborhoods of Houston, such as Denver Harbor, the Houston Heights, Magnolia Park, and the Northside. Between 1985 and 2005, the county's Hispanic population tripled, with Hispanics and Latinos making up about 40% of the county's residents. In most communities inside and outside Beltway 8, Hispanics and Latinos became the predominant ethnic group. Some communities in Greater Houston which do not have Hispanics or Latinos as the predominant ethnic group include expensive, predominantly non-Hispanic white communities such as Memorial, Uptown, and West University Place; and historically African-American neighborhoods located south and northeast of Downtown Houston. Eschbach said, "But even these core black and white neighborhoods are experiencing Hispanic inroads. Today, Hispanics live everywhere."

At the publication of the 2020 census, the Hispanic and Latino American population remained stable at 44% of the city's population.

=== Black and African Americans ===
Historically, the city of Houston had a significant African American population, as this area of the state developed cotton plantation agriculture that was dependent on enslaved laborers. In 2020, its Black and African American population constituted 22.1% of the population. Thousands of enslaved African Americans lived near the city before the American Civil War. Many of them worked on sugar and cotton plantations. Slaves held in the city primarily worked in domestic household and artisan jobs. In 1860 forty-nine percent of the city's population was made up of enslaved people of color. In 1860 nearby Fort Bend County had a population with twice as many black slaves as white residents; it was one of six majority-black counties statewide.

From the 1870s to the 1890s, black people made up almost 40% of Houston's population. Before being effectively disfranchised by the state legislature imposing payment of a poll tax in 1902, they were politically active and strongly supported Republican Party candidates. After disfranchisement, the state legislature established legal segregation and Jim Crow. Between 1910 and 1970, the black population of Houston ranged from 21% to 32.7%. They were virtually without political representation until after 1965 and passage of the federal Voting Rights Act, which enforced their constitutional rights of suffrage. Many blacks left Houston for the West Coast during and after World War II in the Great Migration, as jobs increased rapidly in the defense industry on that coast and social conditions were better.

In 1970, 90% of the black people in Houston lived in predominantly African American neighborhoods, reflecting decades of legal, residential segregation. By 1980 there was some increase in diversity in the city, and 82% of blacks lived in majority-black areas. Since the late 20th century, with changes in social conditions and the burgeoning Houston economy, there has been an increasing New Great Migration of blacks to the South. Many are college educated and have moved to Houston for its lower cost of living and job opportunities compared to some northern and western cities. Many of the new professional migrants settle directly in the suburbs, which offer more housing than the city; among them are upper class, majority-black neighborhoods. Black Enterprise has referred to Houston as the next black mecca. Houston has been ranked among the best U.S. metros for Black professionals. In 2010 Strait and Gong stated that of all ethnic groups in Houston, African Americans were the most segregated from non-Hispanic whites.

=== Asian Americans ===
Houston also has large populations of immigrants from Asia. In addition, the city has the largest Vietnamese American population in Texas and third-largest in the United States as of 2004. Houston also has one of the largest Chinese American, Pakistani American, and Filipino American populations in the United States.

According to a 2002 survey of 500 Asian Americans in Harris County overseen by Stephen Klineberg, a professor at Rice University, Asian immigrants have substantially lower household income than Anglo residents and other immigrant groups, while they have higher levels of education. Indicating the community is severely underemployed. In spite of this, however, the Asian American population has grown from 4.1% of the population in 1990, to 7.1% in 2020.

=== Pacific Islanders ===
In 2020 Harris County had 690 people of native Hawaiian origins. Post 2020 some Hawaiian people began moving to Houston due to decreased costs of living, and in 2022 the Houston Chronicle stated that there were larger numbers of people of Pacific Islander origins.

=== American Indians ===
American Indian communities have existed in the present-day city and area of Houston prior to European colonization and settlement. With the advent of colonialism, its American Indian or Native American population has declined substantially. As of 2021 tribes represented included the Alabama Coushatta, Choctaw, Comanche, Cherokee, Lipan Apache, Muskogee Creek, Navajo, Ponca, and Tunica Biloxi ethnic groups, with about 68,000 Native Americans in the area as of 2010.

Highlighting and preserving their culture, the American Indian Genocide Museum is in Houston. There was a Native American museum, Southern Apache Museum, that opened in 2012 in Northwest Mall. It closed in 2017 due to redevelopment. Area Native Americans opposed the statue of Christopher Columbus in Bell Park until its 2020 removal.

== National origin ==
Houston's foreign-born population increased by 400,000 in a ten-year span ending in 2010. During that span, of all U.S. cities, Houston had the second-largest increase of foreign-born persons. As of 2011, 22% of Greater Houston residents were born in another country. This percentage was the fifth-largest in Texas. In 2015 about 25% of the residents of Harris County—over one million persons—were immigrants. Surrounding counties have percentages similar to that of Harris County. As of that year, immigrants were widely dispersed throughout the Houston area. In 2023, 25% of the people in the Houston area were not born in the United States.

The television program Mo is set in Houston and describes issues regarding immigration to the Houston area.

=== African immigration ===
Circa 2003 a significant number of African immigrants have made the Houston area home. The African immigrants in Houston have higher education levels than other immigrant groups and U.S.-born whites. According to Stephen Klineberg—a sociology professor at Rice University—as of 2003, almost 35% of African immigrants have university degrees, and 28% of African immigrants have postgraduate degrees. In the Houston area, 28% of U.S.-born whites have university degrees, and 16% have postgraduate degrees. In 2016 the city had about 60,000 people of recent African immigrant origin.

The population of people of recent West African origins came with West Africans working for area universities and with West Africans studying at those universities.

In 2019 Ethiopian Airlines CEO Tewolde GebreMariam stated that the presence of African immigrants in United States is one reason related to the airline's decision to establish the Bush Intercontinental Airport-Lome Airport route.

==== Nigerians ====
Charles W. Corey of the U.S. Department of State said in 2003 that it has been estimated that Greater Houston had the largest Nigerian expatriate population in the United States. Circa 2010 over 20,000 people in the Houston area were of recent Nigerian ancestry. As of 2018 about 150,000 Nigerian Americans live in the Houston area. The 2017 American Community Survey estimated that 65,000 Nigerian Americans lived in Texas, the vast majority of which reside in Houston. As of 2003, Houston had 23,000 Nigerian American residents. Many Nigerian Americans choose Houston over other American destinations due to its warmer climate and the ease of establishing businesses. Nigerians in Houston are highly educated and often have postgraduate degrees. By 2014 Nigerians in the Houston area opened Nigerian groceries, restaurants, and churches. There were almost 53,000 people of recent Nigerian origins in the Houston area in 2022. Many Nigerian Americans in Houston live in Alief and Sharpstown.

Until Continental Airlines began nonstop flights to Lagos from George Bush Intercontinental Airport in November 2011, many Nigerians had to fly through Europe to travel between Texas and Nigeria. Jenalia Moreno of the Houston Chronicle said that the Nigerian community and the energy companies in Houston have worked for a long time to get a flight to Nigeria from this city. In 2016 United Airlines, which had merged with Continental, canceled the Lagos route, citing a decline in the energy industry and inability to get currency out of Nigeria.

In 2020 No Passport Required featured Nigerian restaurants in Houston. According to the Migration Policy Institute, 2018 estimates from the U.S. Census Bureau state that 40,000 Houston residents were of recent Nigerian origins.

Until 2006 there was a video rental shop catering to the West African community. Houston has TV services catering to area West Africans, including AfrocentrikTV, Afrovibes Entertainment, and Millenium Broadcasting Corporation. Circa 2024, the University of Houston is one of several universities that attracted Nigerians; Hannah Goldfield of The Atlantic stated that year that a resident of Houston told her that the University of Houston was one of the top universities considered by Nigerian citizens planning to attend American universities.

==== Ethiopians ====
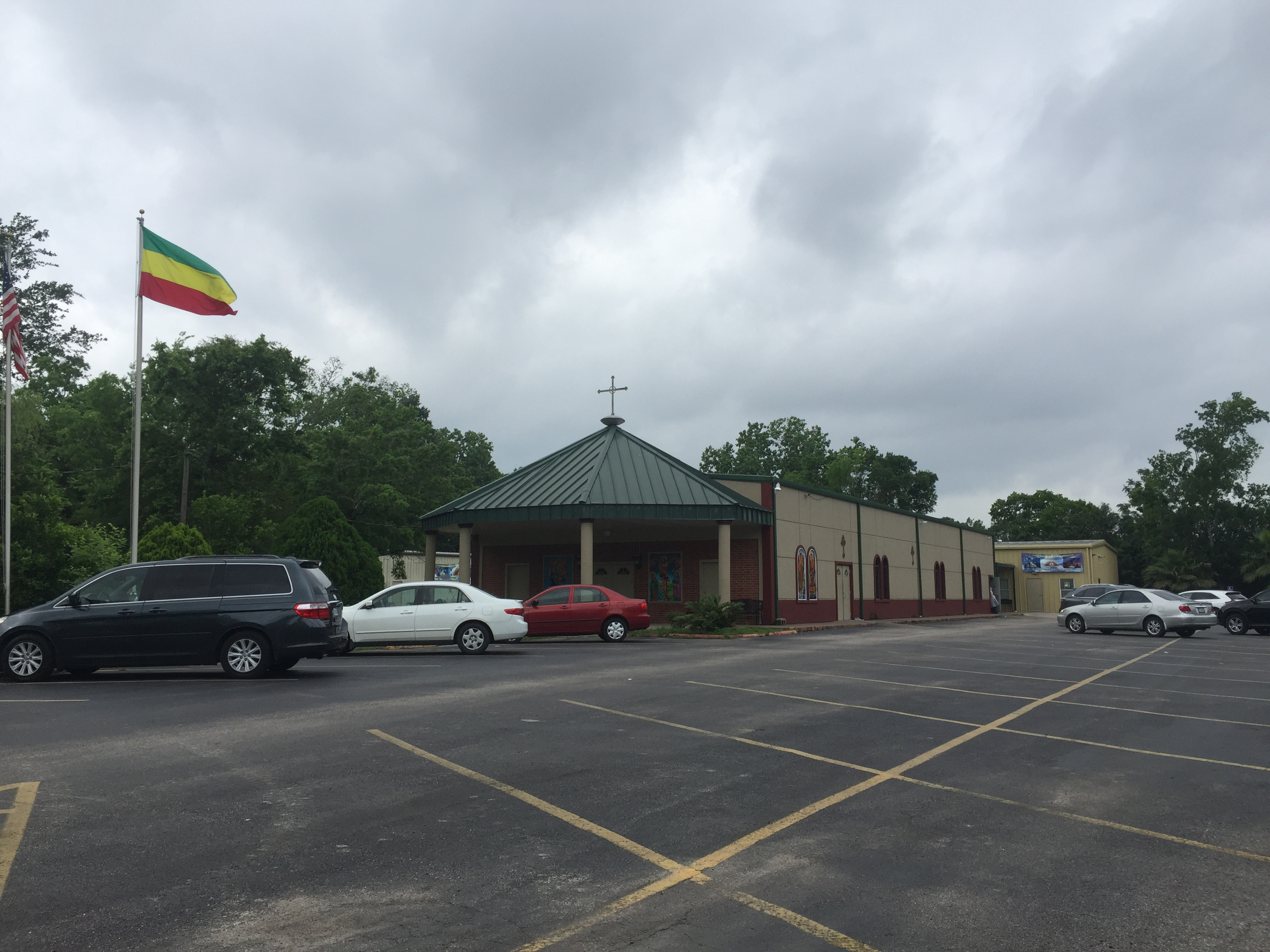
Debre Selam Medhanealem Ethiopian Orthodox Tewahdo Church in Fondren Southwest

Mesfin Genanaw, a Houston Community College teacher who was one of the individuals who assisted with the building of the area Ethiopian Orthodox church, stated in a 2003 Houston Chronicle article that there was estimated 5,000 Ethiopians in Greater Houston. In 2020, Dai Huynh wrote in Buzz Magazines that the number of ethnic Ethiopians in the Houston area goes "from 3,000 to 10,000 depending on whom you ask".

One Ethiopian Orthodox church in Houston is the Debre Selam Medhanealem Ethiopian Orthodox Tewahdo Church. Prior to the construction of the church, those of the Ethiopian Orthodox faith worshiped at Coptic Orthodox churches. Genanaw, stated that in 1992 20 Ethiopian women who were attending a Coptic church planned the establishment of an Ethiopian church. In 1993 the group purchased a 2.5-acre (1.0 ha) site and a tent, and conducted church services in a tent. After fundraisers were held, in 1995 construction of the permanent church started, and the church later obtained an additional 5 acres (2.0 ha) of land.

In 2020 Huynh wrote "the Ethiopian restaurant scene is vibrant" with several restaurants in the Gulfton area.

==== Other African immigrants ====
As of 2009 the number of Equatorial Guinean citizens in the Houston area under 100, was the largest Equatorial Guinean population in the United States. The Consulate-General of Equatorial Guinea in Houston is located in Houston.

St. Nicholas Catholic Church in East Downtown (historically the Third Ward) has African immigrants in its congregation. By 2012 the church held Swahili masses due to it gaining African immigrant parishioners. In particular it has a group of Cameroonians in the congregation served by the Assumption Cameroonian Catholic Community, so it has services each month tailored to that group.

=== European and Middle Eastern immigration ===
European immigration was often from Western Europe until 1965. Since the late 20th century, new immigrants have arrived from Norway, Russia, and the Middle East. In addition, there are nationals from the United Kingdom and other countries who work in Houston periodically. Lasse Sigurd Seim—the consul general of the Norwegian Consulate General, Houston—described the estimated 5,000–6,000 Norwegians in the Houston area around 2008 as the largest concentration of ethnic Norwegians outside of Scandinavia. Jenalia Moreno of the Houston Chronicle said during that year that the influx of Norwegians into Greater Houston was "relatively new" and related to Norway's also having a major oil industry.

In a 2004 Houston Chronicle article, Nikolai V. Sofinskiy, the first consul general of the Consulate-General of Russia in Houston, said that there were around 40,000 Russian speakers in the Houston area.

As of 1983, there were about 10,000 British nationals in Houston. Annette Baird of the Houston Chronicle said that, as of December 2000, the number of British citizens in Greater Houston was estimated to be over 40,000. Grainne O'Reilly-Askew, the first headmistress of the British School of Houston, said that before the school was established, British companies encountered difficulty in convincing their executives to relocate to Greater Houston, since the area previously did not have a school using the British educational system. John Major, the former Prime Minister of the United Kingdom, attended the school's official opening.

Circa 2013 the Houston area had about 98,300 people of Middle Eastern origins, with a margin of error of more than 27,700. This figure includes people of Arab, Iranian, Israeli, and Turkish origins.

==== Armenians ====
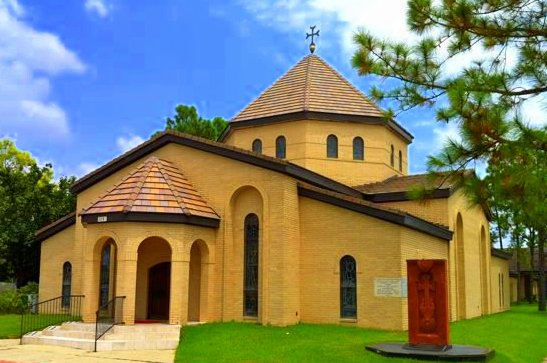
St. Kevork Armenian Church

As of 2007, there were about 4,000–5,000 ethnic Armenians in the Houston area, according to St. Kevork parish council chairperson Vreij Kolandjian and pontifical visit host committee chairperson David Onanian. St. Kevork Armenian Church, which was established around 1982, serves as the Armenian Apostolic Church facility in Houston. As of 2007 about 10% of the ethnic Armenians in Houston were active in this church.

==== Czechs ====
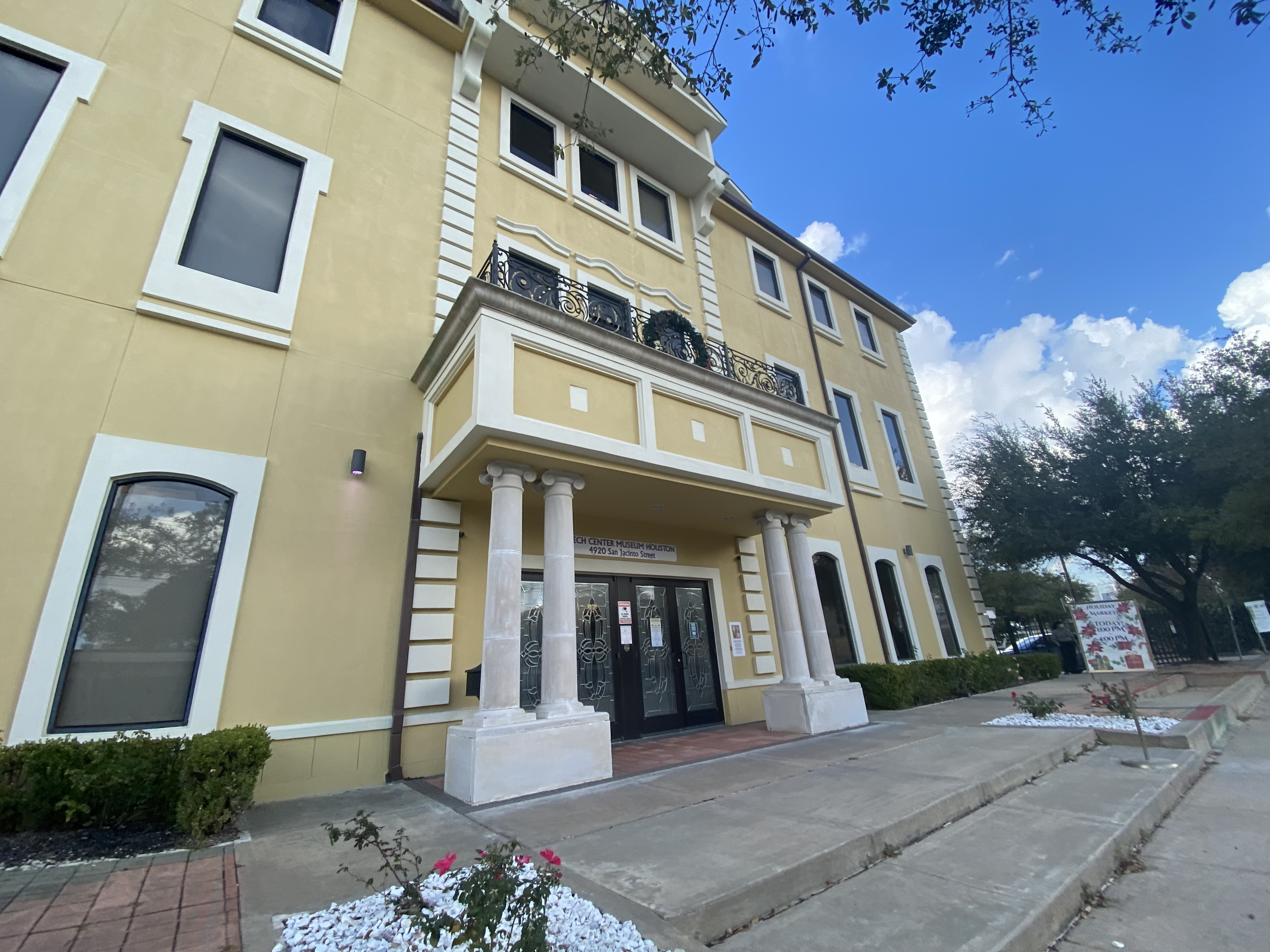
Houston Czech Center

Czechs, also known as Bohemians, arrived in Texas around the mid-1840s. Although they tended to settle more in areas around Austin and the Texas Hill Country of central Texas, a sizeable community exists in Houston. The Czech Center Museum celebrates their achievements and contribution to Texas life and culture.

==== Germans ====
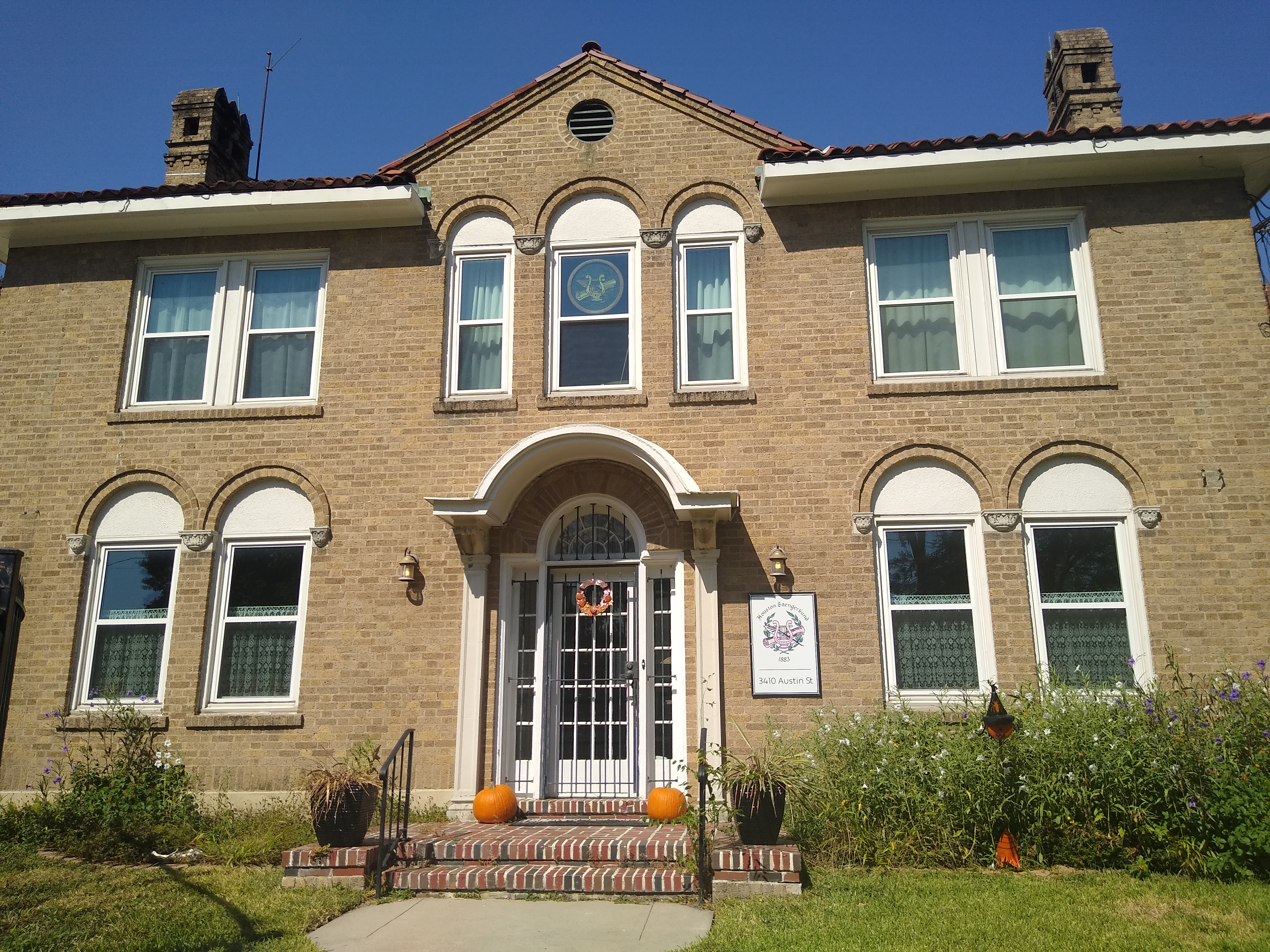
Houston Saengerbund of the First Lutheran Church in Midtown, Houston

German immigrants arrived in number following the revolutions of 1848 in the German states, like their Bohemian brethren; they tended to oppose slavery and supported the Republican Party through the Reconstruction era. The Second Ward, in the 1800s, had a heavily German American community. Thomas McWhorter, author of "From Das Zweiter to El Segundo, A Brief History of Houston's Second Ward," wrote that "Second Ward became an unofficial hub of German-American culture and social life during the nineteenth century." German settlers also predominated in Spring Branch, a community that later become a part of Houston, in the mid-1800s.

Houston Saengerbund, established in 1883, is a German-American singing group; there were groups like it that proliferated in communities of Germans overseas in the 1800s. It bought the William Hamblen House in 1913. As of 2010 the group still conducts regular meetings. It was the final German American cultural organization to be established in the Second Ward. In the late 1800s Volksfest Park hosted the Volkfest festival, a German-American event. Its attendance prompted the Bayou Street Railway Company to, in 1889, add a mule car line to the park.

==== Greeks ====
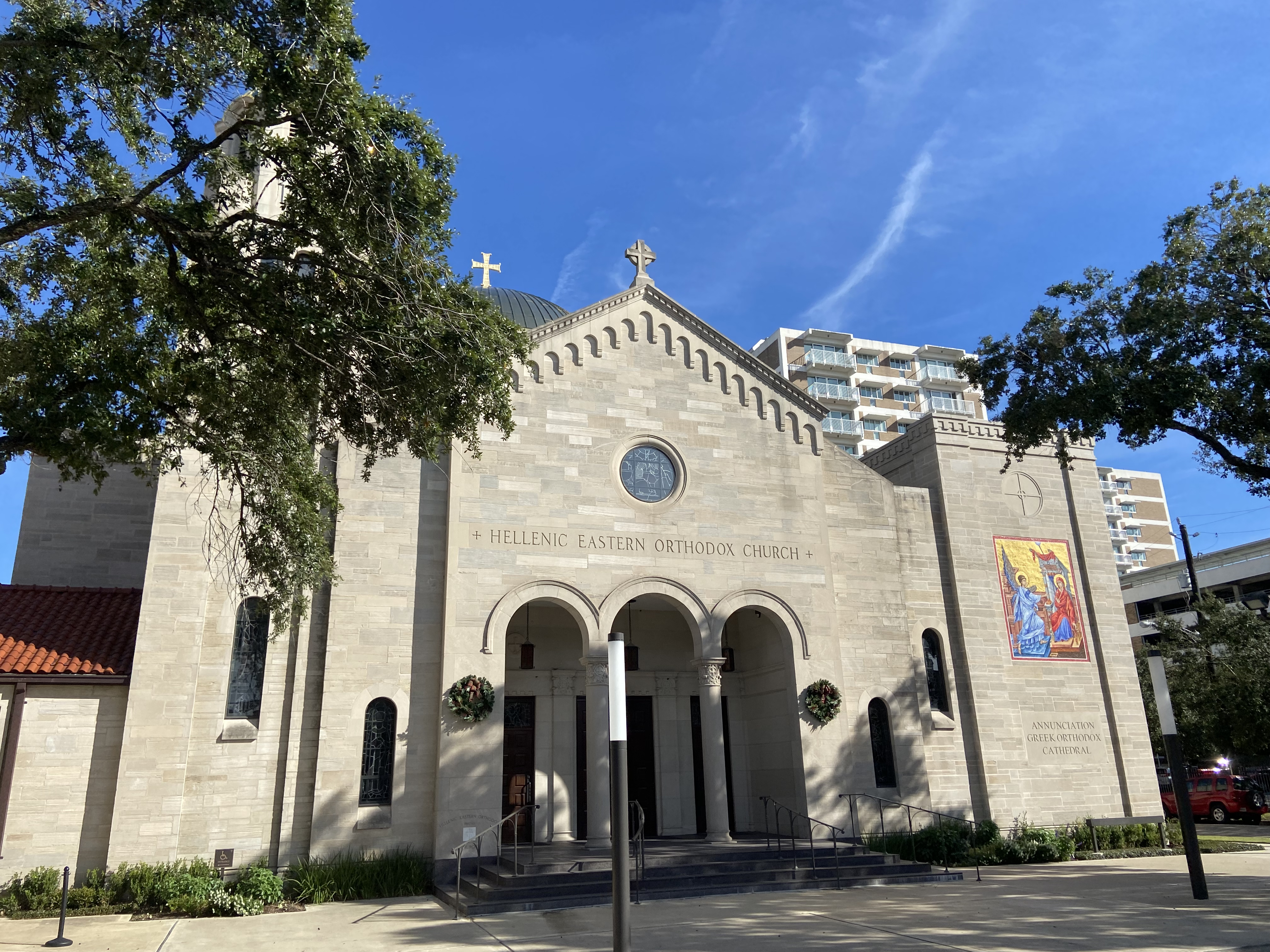
Annunciation Greek Orthodox Cathedral in Montrose, Houston

The first recorded ethnic Greeks in Houston, listed in the Houston City Directory of 1889–1890, were George and Peter Poleminacos. They worked as manual laborers, as they did not speak English. Kalliope Vlahos was the first Greek woman to arrive, in 1903; after her, more women and families with children began settling Houston. Many of the earliest settlers planned to make money in the U.S. and then return to their homelands. Several Greeks became businessowners; historically many Greeks operated cafes and sweets shops in Downtown Houston. The capital start-up costs of such shops were relatively low.

==== Italians ====
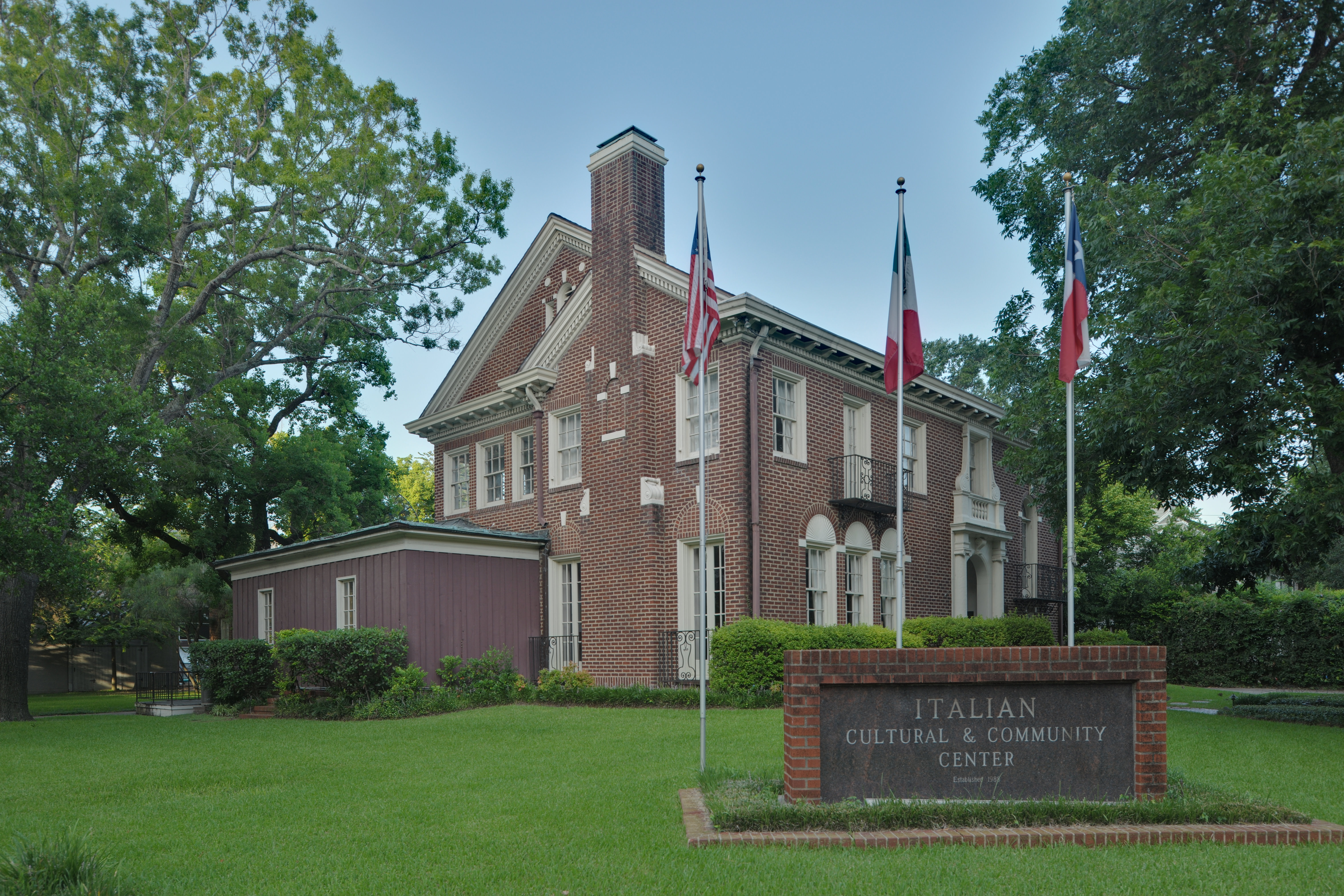
The Logue House in the Houston Museum District area, which houses the Italian Cultural and Community Center (ICCC)

As of 2002 about 40,000 people in the Houston area were of Italian descent.

Brina D'Amico, a member of the D'Amico restaurateur family, said in 2014 that most Italian-American families in Houston were of Sicilian origins, and their immigrant ancestors had entered in the late 19th and early 20th centuries at the Port of Galveston. In addition to Galveston, many other southern Italians arrived through Indianola, Texas and New Orleans, while several people from northern Italy entered through Ellis Island and traveled from there to Texas. Many ethnic Italians, after arrival, began working in groceries. Prior to 1900 Galveston, then more prominent than Houston, attracted Italian immigrants.

In previous eras there were over twenty ethnic Italian clubs in the Houston area, with several associated with particular religious institutions; immigrants founded several of them, and several were defunct by 2018. Federation of Italian-American Organizations of Greater Houston is a collection of Italian American organizations. In 2018 it hosted five to six of the aforementioned clubs. The Italian Cultural and Community Center (ICCC) is located in the Houston Museum District, and is operated by the federation. The ICCC and federation offices are in the John G. Logue House, which the federation obtained in 1988.

In the "Space Age" era, many members of that ethnic group moved to Glenbrook Valley.

La Voce, an ethnic newspaper published by the federation, had a circulation of 3,700 as of 2001.

The ICCC holds the Houston Italian Festival or Festa Italiana every year. It has music, food, and art programs. The city government provides funding and proceeds help fund the ICCC. The festival started in 1979.

The first volume of Houstonians of Italian Descent, a non-fiction non-academic collection with personal testimonies about ethnic Italian communities as well as information about religious and organizational institutions, was released in 2002. Lena Mandola of the Mandola restaurateur family was the principal driver behind the book. The creators of the book deemed the sales of the first volume to be positive, and the second volume was released in 2004.

Bell Park in the Houston Museum District area formerly had a statue of Christopher Columbus, which the Italian American Organizations of Greater Houston Inc. had commissioned. In 1992 the organization donated the statue to the city government. By 2020 Columbus became a target of criticism, with detractors citing his holding slaves. Area Native Americans expressed their desire that the statue no longer be in place. In a single week in June 2020 there were instances where vandals attacked the statue, with two instances involving red paint placed on the statue and one instance of the removal of one of the statue's hands. On Friday June 19, 2020, the statue was taken out of the park.

==== Norwegians ====
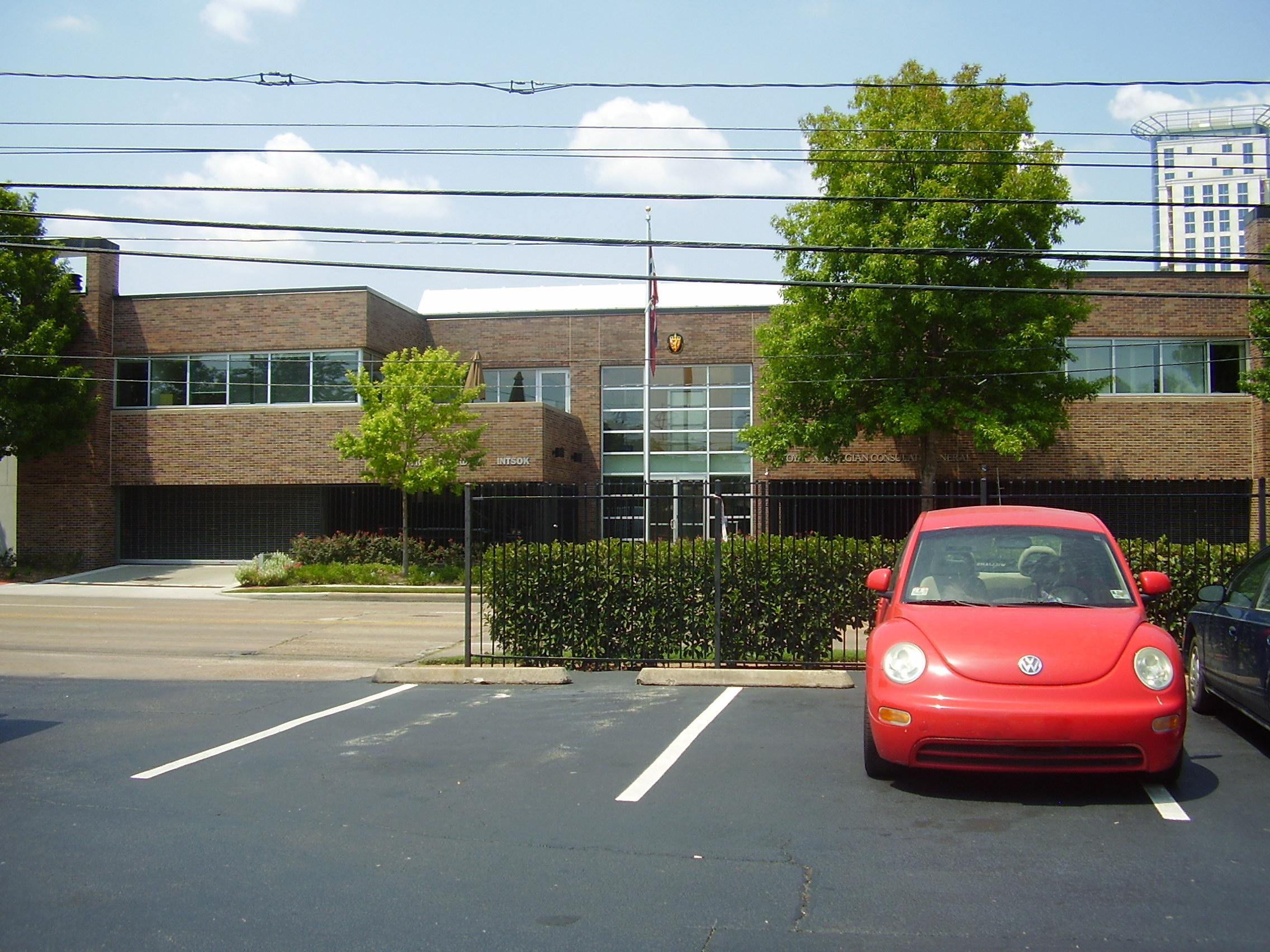
Norway House, which housed the Consulate-General of Norway in Houston

In the late 1800s, more Norwegians arrived at the port of Galveston than any other United States port other than Ellis Island in New York City. Many of the Norwegians who were processed through Galveston migrated to join compatriots in farming areas of Minnesota and other areas in the Midwestern United States. Houston and Stavanger, Norway have been sister cities since 1980, furthering this relationship.

==== Poles ====
The city has a Polish American church, Our Lady of Czestochowa Roman Catholic Parish in Spring Branch, established in the 1980s. At the time Polish immigrants who resisted communist rule in that country arrived in Houston. There is a Polish festival, Houston Polish Festival, held twice each year. In 2019 organizer Damian Reichert stated that it was the state's only major Polish festival.

==== Romanis ====
Houston has a significant Romani population.

==== Ukrainians ====
The Ukrainian American Cultural Club of Houston is active in the city. After the 2022 invasion of Ukraine, a former president of the organization Iryna Petrovska Marchiano, arranged to have a mural created to show support for Ukraine.

There is a pan-Slavic shop called the General Store. It was known as the Russian General Store until 2022, and changed its name in response to the 2022 Russian invasion of Ukraine.

==== Iranians/Persians ====
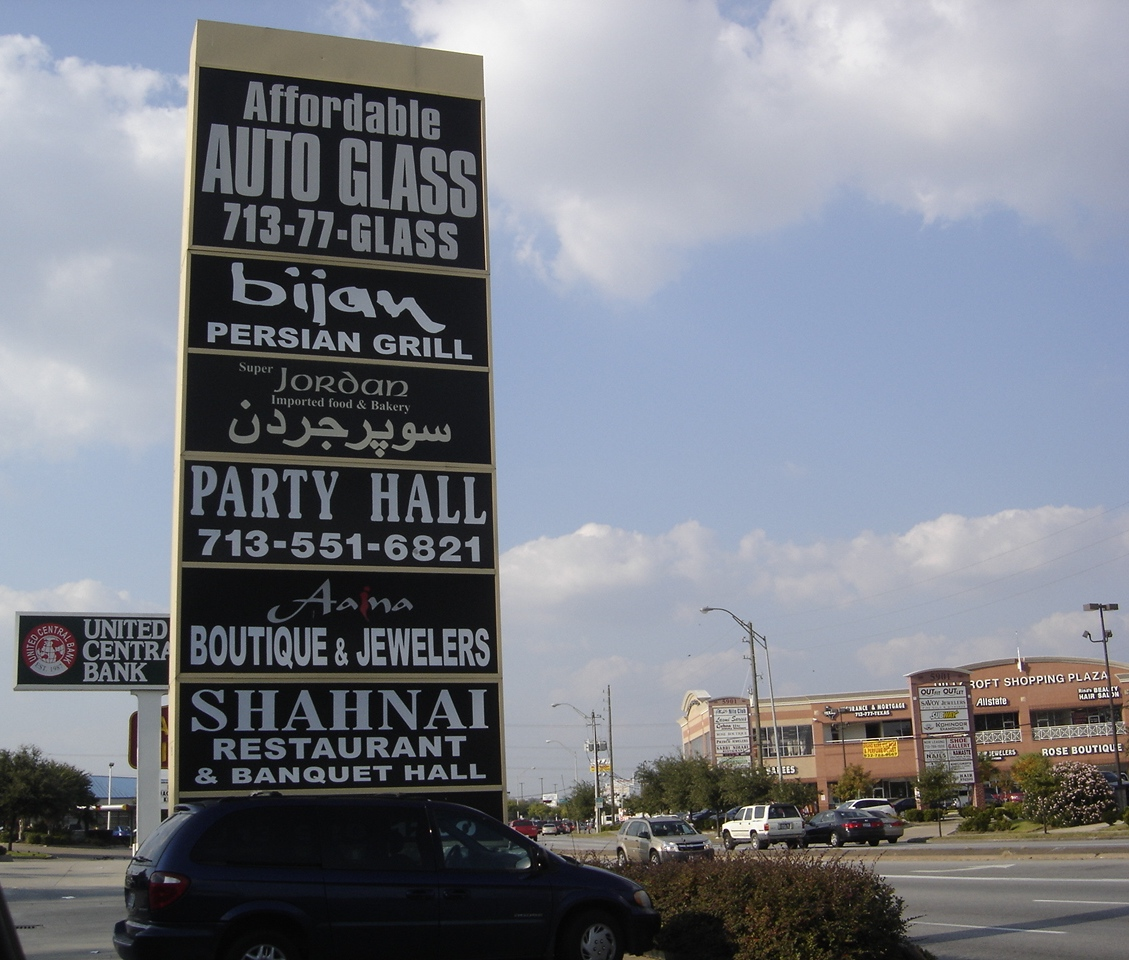
Iranian businesses along Hillcroft Avenue

As of 1994, over 50,000 ethnic Iranians live in Houston. As of that year, 12 city blocks along Hillcroft Avenue, from Westheimer Road to a point just south of Westpark, contain a Persian business district including shops and restaurants. Allison Cook of the Houston Press referred to the area as "Little Persia".

As of 1990 most Iranians/Persians in Houston are not religious.

As of 2000, Iranians were one of the two main Zoroastrian groups in Houston. As of that year the total number of Iranians in Houston of all religions is larger than the total Parsi (generally immigrants from India) population by a 10 to 1 ratio.

Rustomji wrote that as of 2000, because of the historic tensions between the Parsi and Iranian groups, the Iranians in Houston did not become full members of the Zoroastrian Association of Houston (ZAH), which was majority Parsi. Rustomji stated that Iranian Zoroastrians "attend religious functions sporadically and remain tentative about their ability to fully integrate, culturally and religiously, with Parsis." In 1996 the Iranian population had its largest attendance at a ZAH event when it attended Jashne-e-Sade, an event the community created for ZAH. By 2000 some Muslim Iranians who were opposed to fundamentalism in the mosques, began attending Zoroastrian events. Rustomji wrote in 2000 that from 2000 to 2005, Iranians were expected to make up a greater proportion of ZAH.

As of 2006, most member of the Houston Haziratu'l-Quds (a Baháʼí Faith center) were Persians. As of 2010 many Houston Baháʼí are refugees from Iran. In Iran many of their relatives and parents suffered state sanctioned persecution of Baháʼís, being arrested and/or executed.

After Iranian student and activist Gelareh Bagherzadeh was murdered in Houston in 2012, Lomi Kriel of the Houston Chronicle stated that "The case has been complicated by the possible Iranian link and the close-knit nature of Houston's Iranian community. Many have been either afraid to talk or reluctant to disclose details they consider private or disrespectful." The perpetrator, Ali Irsan, was later convicted and sentenced to death for the crime, an honor killing in retaliation against Bagherzadeh's encouragement of Irsan's daughter to leave Islam and marry a Christian man.

==== Arabs and other Middle Easterners ====
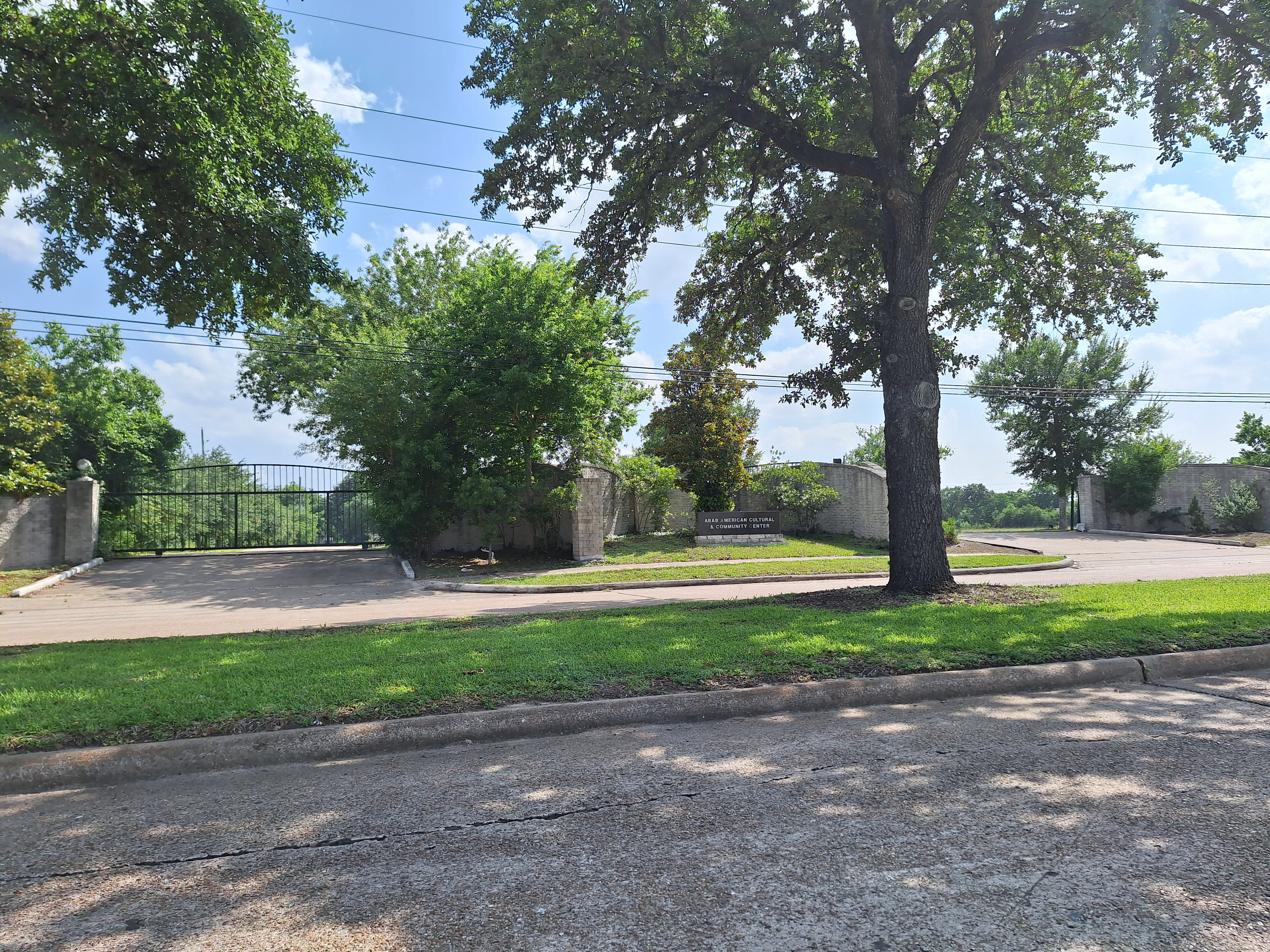
Arab American Cultural and Community Center in Alief, Houston

As of 2008 multiple Houston-area restaurants selling Levantine cuisine also served sandwiches. This trend started with Lebanese American Jalal Antone, who opened Antone's Import Company. He advised Levantine businesspeople that American people at the time would consider Levantine cuisine to be too foreign, so it would make more business sense to open a sandwich shop that also sells Levantine dishes on its menu.

Badr stated that as of 2000, about 10% of the Islamic Society of Greater Houston (ISGH) consists of ethnic Arabs, from a variety of Middle East nations. She added that the percentage of Arabs among Houston's Muslim population is estimated by some to be "as high as 30%." According to Badr, from 1990 to 2000 many Arabs began to found their own mosques and Islamic schools separate from the ISGH. They disagreed about various issues with other members of the Society, including the language of the Friday sermons in the mosques, the operations of Sunday schools and full-time schools, and monetary collection and distribution within the community.

As of 2014 U.S. census estimates, 23,300 people in the Houston area spoke Arabic; this was a one-third increase in the number of Arabic speakers compared to 2009.

=== Refugee populations ===
Since the 1970s—when Houston began absorbing Vietnamese refugees after the Fall of Saigon—Houston has become a destination for refugee resettlement. About 1,600 refugees arrive at George Bush Intercontinental Airport per year. Refugees from Afghanistan, Bhutan, El Salvador, Cuba, Iraq, Myanmar, and Somalia have settled in Houston; Burundians from Rwanda have also settled in Houston. Over the three years leading to 2009, Houston took about 2,200 Burmese. The number of people born outside of the United States in the Houston area increased by 400,000 between 2000 and 2010. In 2014 a total of 4,818 refugees from 40 countries settled in Harris County. That year, of all counties in Texas, Harris County had the largest number of refugee settlements. In 2015 there were about 1 million people born outside of the United States in the Greater Houston metropolitan area, which would be below 25% of the total population. As of 2015, if the Houston area was its own country, it would rank among the top five countries in the world for refugee resettlement.

The South Texas Office of Refugees stated that from 2009 to 2021 11,790 people came from Afghanistan to the Houston area, with 90% of them having Special Immigrant Visas which belonged to Afghans who interpreted for the U.S. military. From 2015 to 2021 1,700 people from Afghanistan who interpreted for U.S. military forces and/or are family members of these interpreters moved to the Houston area. According to the Refugee Resettlement Data 1975–2018 dataset by the University of Gottingen and the University of Western Australia, 885 refugees from Afghanistan moved to Harris County between 1975 and 2018; according to the data, Afghans made up the 16th largest such group in the county.

In 2021 the Houston Chronicle reported that Afghans in Houston had negative views of the Fall of Kabul on August 15, where the Taliban replaced the former Afghan government with the Islamic Emirate of Afghanistan. The group Afghan Community Houston held protests denouncing the Taliban takeover. Between the Fall of Kabul and August 18, 100 Afghans moved to Houston from Fort Lee. On August 19 the group The Alliance stated on August 19 that it planned to move 70 Afghan refugees to Houston later that month.

From 1975 to 2018, 74,050 refugees settled Harris County, the seventh largest figure for a county.

==== Romani ====
Houston has the largest population of Romani people in Texas.

== Languages ==
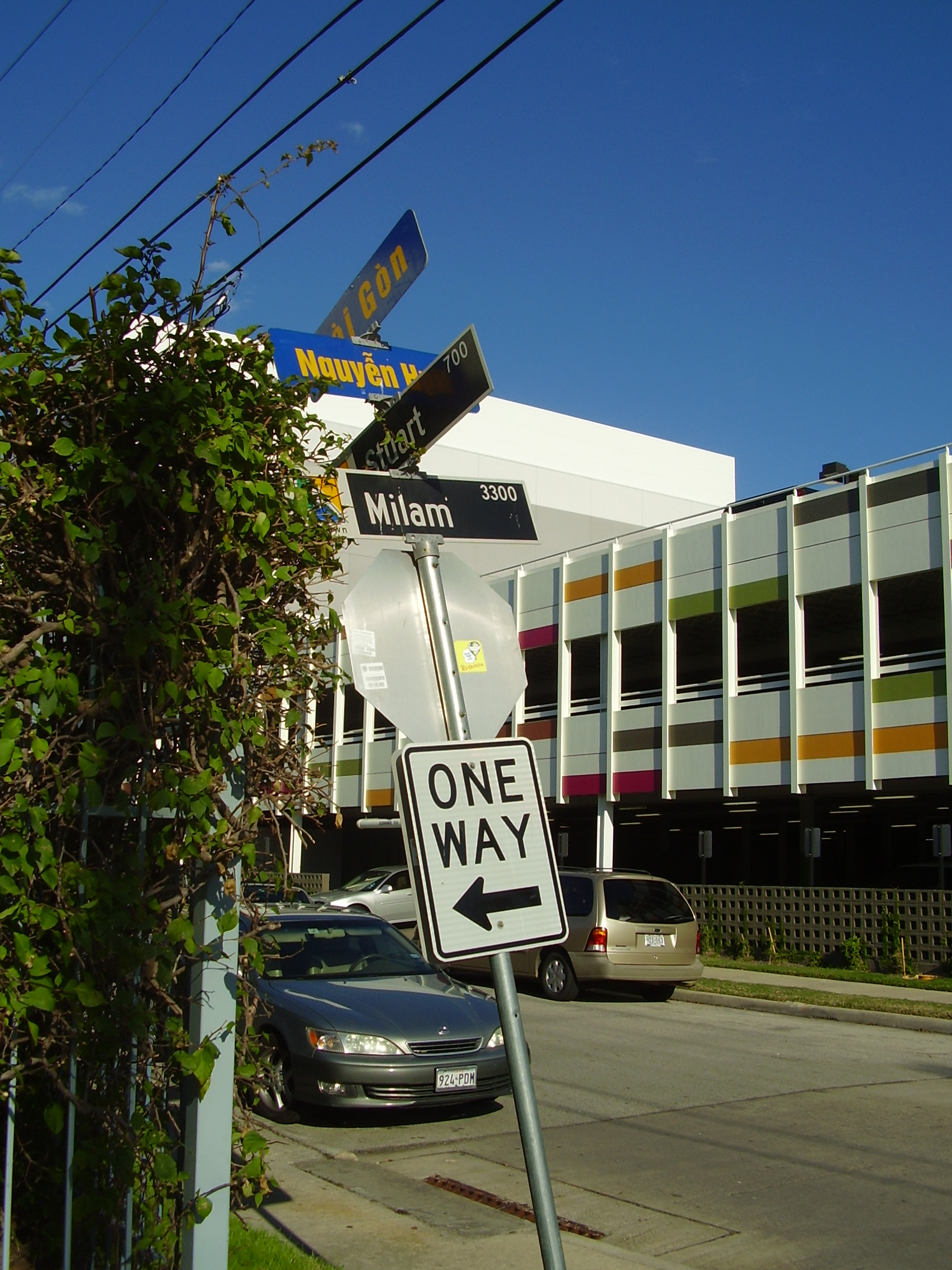
Several streets in the Midtown district have Vietnamese names

Historically, Houstonians tend to pronounce Southern English with the drawl typical of the Lower South.

A total of 938,123 residents of the city of Houston said that they spoke English only, according to the 2000 census. The largest foreign languages in Houston included Spanish and Spanish creole (679,292 speakers), Vietnamese (26,125 speakers), Chinese (24,234 speakers), African indigenous languages (11,603 speakers), and Urdu of Pakistan (10,669 speakers). Percentages of the non-English groups who said that they spoke English at least "very well" include 42% of the Spanish speakers, 32% of the Vietnamese speakers, 49% of the Chinese speakers, 72% of the speakers of indigenous African languages, and 70% of the speakers of Urdu.

In 2000, 1,961,993 residents of Harris County spoke English only. The five largest foreign languages in the county were Spanish or Spanish Creole (1,106,883 speakers), Vietnamese (53,311 speakers), Chinese (33,003 speakers), French including Cajun and Patois (33,003 speakers), and Urdu of Pakistan (14,595 speakers). Percentages of language groups who said that they spoke English at least "very well" include 46% of Spanish speakers, 37% of Vietnamese speakers, 50% of Chinese speakers, 85% of French speakers, and 72% of Urdu speakers. Southwestern Louisiana Creole language is spoken in Houston.

As of 2015, about 40% of Harris County residents spoke languages other than English. By 2021 American Community Survey estimates, 46.2% of the city's population spoke a language other than English. In contrast, 53.8% of the population only spoke English. The second-most spoken language for Houston was Spanish at 37.2%.

According to the 2022 American Community Survey, the most commonly spoken languages in Houston by people aged 5 years and over (2,149,641 people):

- Speak only English: 51.5%
- Language other than English: 48.5%
- Spanish: 38.9%
- Asian languages and Pacific Island languages: 4.4%
- Other Indo-European languages: 3.4%
- Other languages: 1.8%

== Religion ==
Religion in Houston (2020)
1. Protestantism (40.0%)
2. Catholicism (29.0%)
3. Unaffiliated (21.0%)
4. Other Christianity (3.00%)
5. Islam (2.00%)
6. Judaism (1.00%)
7. Buddhism (1.00%)
8. Hinduism (0.50%)
9. Other religion (1.50%)
10. Don’t know (1.00%)

According to the Pew Research Center and D Magazine, Houston and its metropolitan area are the third-most religious and Christian area by percentage of population in the United States, and second in Texas behind the Dallas–Fort Worth metroplex.

Historically, the city of Houston has been a center of Protestantism, being part of the culturally conservative and evangelical Bible Belt. Other Christian groups including Eastern and Oriental Orthodox Christianity, and non-Christian religions did not grow for much of the city's history because immigration was predominantly from Western Europe, which at the time was dominated by Western Christianity and favored by the quotas in federal immigration law. The Immigration and Nationality Act of 1965 removed the quotas, allowing for the growth of other religions.

In the same study by the Pew Research Center, an estimated 20% of Houston-area residents claimed no religious affiliation, compared to about 23% nationwide. Houston-area residents identifying with other religions (including Islam, Judaism, Buddhism, and Hinduism) collectively made up about 7% of the religious and spiritual population.

== LGBT community ==
Montrose historically has been the center of the LGBT community in Houston. The Houstonian LGBT community was attracted to Montrose as a neighborhood after encountering it while patronizing Art Wren. Within Montrose, new gay bars began to open. By 1985, the flavor and politics of the neighborhood were heavily influenced by the LGBT community, and in 1990, according to Hill, 19% of Montrose residents identified as LGBT. Due to continued gentrification, by 2011 many in the LGBT community moved to the Houston Heights and Houston-area suburbs.

== Health ==
In 2010 the University of Texas Health Science Center at Houston released a Health of Houston Survey. Based on the survey results, 20% of area residents considered themselves to be in poor or fair health. Half of the Houston area residents did not have dental insurance. The area's percentage of individuals who reported having psychiatric distress was twice the U.S. national average. Of the racial groups, after excluding illegal immigrants, Hispanics and Latinos had the lowest rates of health insurance. Houston is also part of the Stroke Belt along with many other Southern cities.

== Wealth and income ==
As of 2015, in maps showing average income, there is a geographic shape in a form similar to an arrow in the center-west part of Houston, beginning near Downtown Houston and going west to Memorial, which generally has wealthier residents.

== Politics ==
In 2013 Allen Turner of the Houston Chronicle reported that residents of Harris County were "consistently conservative in elections", voting for Republican candidates in local, state and federal elections. But, according to a Rice University Kinder Institute for Urban Research 2013 opinion poll, they were surprisingly liberal on a variety of hot-button social topics, "such as immigration, gun control and equal matrimonial rights for same-sex couples".

== See also ==
- Demographics of Dallas
- Demographics of Texas
- Demographics of Dallas–Fort Worth
- Demographics of San Antonio
