= Logue House =

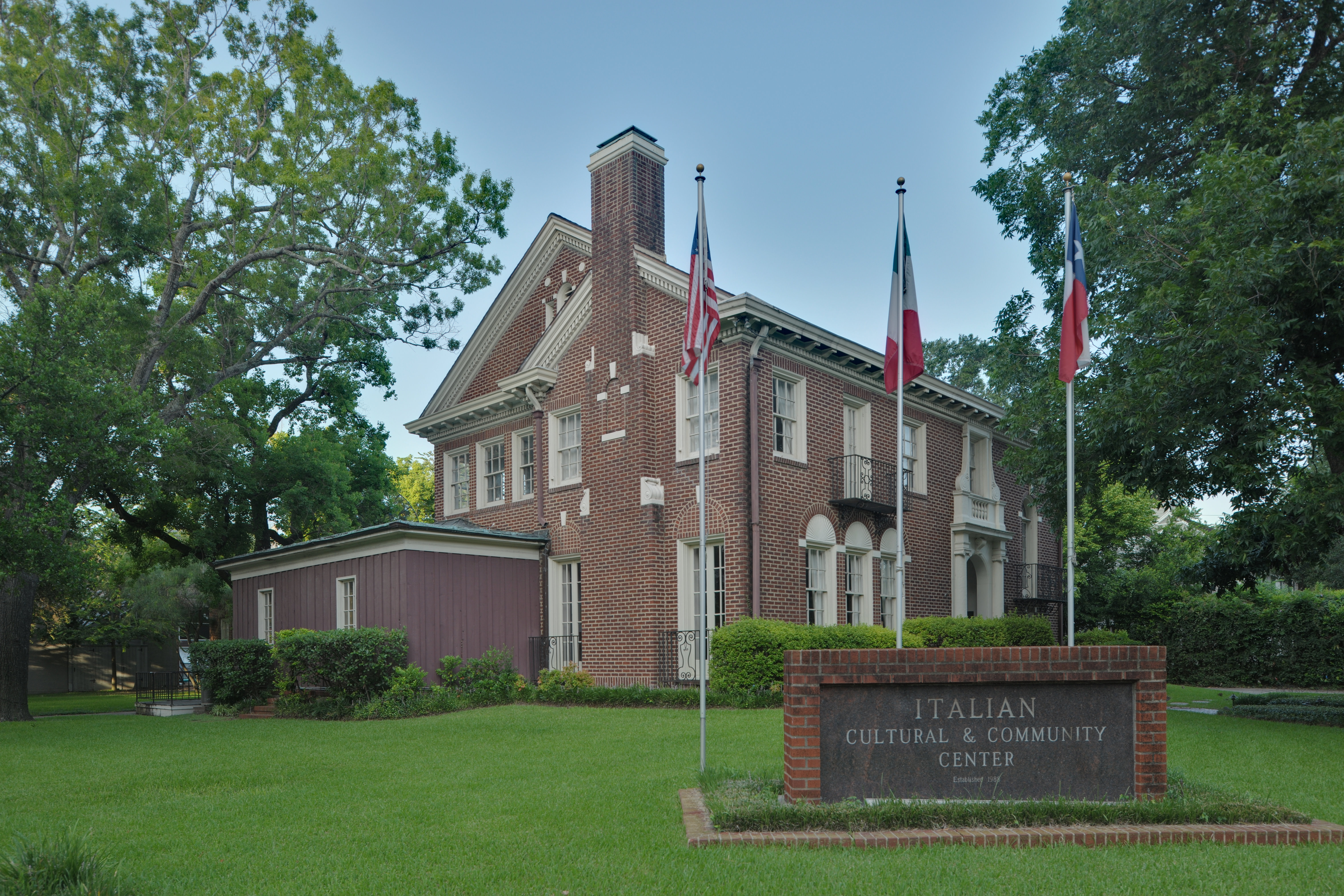
The Logue House, which houses the Italian Cultural and Community Center (ICCC)

The John G. Logue House is a building in the Museum District area in Houston, Texas. The building, named after lawyer John G. Logue, the owner, was designed by William Ward Watkin and constructed in 1923. At one time Rice University's Shepherd School of Music held its classes at the Logue House.

The Federation of Italian-American Organizations of Greater Houston obtained it in 1988 and the building houses the organization's offices and the Italian Cultural and Community Center (ICCC). Because of the latter, the building itself is also known as the "Italian Cultural Center". The center hosts cultural events such as movie nights and wine tastings as well as Italian language and culture classes.

In 1998 the National Park Service (NPS) listed the Logue House on the National Register of Historic Places (NRHP).

It is in proximity to Montrose.

== See also ==
- Ethnic groups in Houston § Italians
- American Italian Cultural Center in New Orleans, Louisiana
