= Demographics of Dallas–Fort Worth =

Historical populations – Dallas MSA (1950–1970)
| Census | Pop. | Note | %± |
|---|---|---|---|
| 1950 | 614,799 | | — |
| 1960 | 1,083,601 | | 76.3% |
| 1970 | 1,555,950 | | 43.6% |
U.S. Decennial Census

Historical populations – Fort Worth MSA (1950–1970)
| Census | Pop. | Note | %± |
|---|---|---|---|
| 1950 | 361,253 | | — |
| 1960 | 573,215 | | 58.7% |
| 1970 | 762,086 | | 32.9% |
U.S. Decennial Census

Historical populations
| Census | Pop. | Note | %± |
|---|---|---|---|
| 1980 | 2,974,805 | | — |
| 1990 | 3,885,415 | | 30.6% |
| 2000 | 5,161,544 | | 32.8% |
| 2010 | 6,371,773 | | 23.4% |
| 2020 | 7,637,387 | | 19.9% |

Dallas–Fort Worth is the most populous metropolitan area of Texas, and the Southern United States. Having 7,637,387 residents at the 2020 U.S. census, the metropolitan statistical area has experienced positive growth trends since the former Dallas and Fort Worth metropolitan areas conurbated into the Metroplex. By the 2022 census estimates, its population grew to 7,943,685.

== Population ==
| County | 2022 estimate | 2020 census | Change | Area | Density |
|---|---|---|---|---|---|
| Dallas County | 2,600,840 | 2,613,539 | −0.49% | 871.28 sq mi (2,256.6 km^{2}) | 2,985/sq mi (1,153/km^{2}) |
| Tarrant County | 2,154,595 | 2,110,640 | +2.08% | 863.61 sq mi (2,236.7 km^{2}) | 2,495/sq mi (963/km^{2}) |
| Collin County | 1,158,696 | 1,064,465 | +8.85% | 841.22 sq mi (2,178.7 km^{2}) | 1,377/sq mi (532/km^{2}) |
| Denton County | 977,281 | 906,422 | +7.82% | 878.43 sq mi (2,275.1 km^{2}) | 1,113/sq mi (430/km^{2}) |
| Ellis County | 212,182 | 192,455 | +10.25% | 935.49 sq mi (2,422.9 km^{2}) | 227/sq mi (88/km^{2}) |
| Johnson County | 195,506 | 179,927 | +8.66% | 724.69 sq mi (1,876.9 km^{2}) | 270/sq mi (104/km^{2}) |
| Kaufman County | 172,366 | 145,310 | +18.62% | 780.70 sq mi (2,022.0 km^{2}) | 221/sq mi (85/km^{2}) |
| Parker County | 165,834 | 148,222 | +11.88% | 903.48 sq mi (2,340.0 km^{2}) | 184/sq mi (71/km^{2}) |
| Rockwall County | 123,208 | 107,819 | +14.27% | 127.04 sq mi (329.0 km^{2}) | 970/sq mi (374/km^{2}) |
| Hunt County | 108,282 | 99,956 | +8.33% | 840.32 sq mi (2,176.4 km^{2}) | 129/sq mi (50/km^{2}) |
| Wise County | 74,895 | 68,632 | +9.13% | 904.42 sq mi (2,342.4 km^{2}) | 83/sq mi (32/km^{2}) |
| Total | 7,943,685 | 7,637,387 | +4.01% | 8,670.68 sq mi (22,457.0 km^{2}) | 916/sq mi (354/km^{2}) |

At the 2020 U.S. census 7,637,387 people lived in the area, up from 6,371,773 in 2010, and 2,974,805 in 1970.

Among the population in 2015, an estimated 101,588 foreign-born residents moved to the Metroplex. Of the immigrant population, 44.1% were from Latin America, 35.8% Asia, 7.1% Europe, and 13.1% Africa. In 2010, 77,702 foreign nationals immigrated; approximately 50.6% came from Latin America, 33.0% from Asia, 7.3% Europe, and 9.1% Africa. During the 2020 American Community Survey, an estimated 18.5% of its population were foreign-born, with 56% from Latin America, 30% Asia, 8% Africa, 4% Europe, and 1% elsewhere from North America.

== Race and ethnicity ==
In 2020, the Dallas–Fort Worth metroplex's racial composition was 42% non-Hispanic white, 16% Black or African American, 8% Asian, 3-4% two or more races, and 29% Hispanic or Latino American of any race. According to information gathered from the North Texas Commission, the Metroplex's racial and ethnic makeup was 46% non-Hispanic white, 15% Black or African American, 7% Asian American, and 3% from other races in 2017. Ethnically, Hispanics and Latinos of any race made up 29% of the metropolitan population. From 2010 to 2017, Hispanics and Latinos increased an estimated 38.9% followed by Blacks and African Americans.

=== White and European Americans ===
White and European Americans, since settlement, have been the largest racial and ethnic group for the present-day Metroplex, until an increase in immigration and white flight. From 2000 to 2014 the absolute number of non-Hispanic white children in the metropolitan area increased by 140,000 from 2000 to 2014, although their relative percentage of the overall number of children in the area declined. In that period the population of non-Hispanic white children largely shifted to Collin, Denton, and Rockwall counties away from Dallas County. From 1997 to 2015, in the first three counties, the number of non-Hispanic white K-12 students increased by 40,000, 20,000, and 6,000, respectively, while the number of non-Hispanic white students in Dallas County public school districts dropped from 138,760 in 1997 to 61,538 in the 2014–2015 school year; during the latter period the charter schools in the county had 5,000 non-Hispanic white students.

=== Middle-Eastern Americans ===
==== Arabs ====
There are approximately 275,000 Arab-Americans around Dallas County, with many of them coming from countries such as Egypt, Iraq, Syria, Lebanon, Palestine, Jordan, Morocco, Algeria, Tunisia, Yemen, etc. The Roman Catholic Diocese of Dallas maintains a Lebanese Maronite Christian mission at Our Lady of Lebanon in Lewisville, established in 1990; as well as the St. Basil the Great Byzantine Catholic Church in Irving, established in 1983.

As of 2008, the number of people of Egyptian heritage was about 5,000 to 10,000 in the Metroplex area.

==== Iranians ====
According to the 2000 census, the Dallas–Fort Worth metroplex had about 6,000 people of Iranian descent. This number has since increased to around 30,000. Plano's Iranian community was large and influential enough to host U.S. Secretary of State Mike Pompeo for a private visit in April 2019. Most Iranians in the DFW area reside in the Plano–Frisco–Allen–McKinney areas north of Dallas although there are several near Arlington in the Mid-Cities region.

==== Kurds ====
There are roughly around 8,000 Kurds in the Dallas-Fort Worth metroplex, with many of them residing around the northern suburbs, especially around Plano. There is also a sizeable Kurdish community around Arlington. Most of them came as refugees from Iraq although there are also Iranian, Syrian and Turkish Kurds in the Metroplex.

=== Hispanics and Latino Americans ===
==== Mexicans ====
Dallas–Fort Worth has one of the largest Mexican-American communities in the United States. In 2002, it was reported that Mexican-Americans make up 80% of Hispanic and Latinos in Dallas–Fort Worth. There are many Mexican restaurants, taco stands, grocery stores, etc. in Dallas-Fort Worth and there is also a pizza chain called Pizza Patron that is very popular amongst Mexican-Americans. There are concentrations of Mexican Americans in Oak Cliff, West Dallas and Arlington. As of the 2000 U.S. census, 63% of the ethnic Mexicans in Dallas County resided in the Dallas city limits.

==== Salvadorans ====
As of 2009, Salvadoran Americans were the second largest Hispanic and Latino ethnic group in DFW. They often settled in the same areas occupied by Mexican-Americans. In 2000, of the Salvadorans in Dallas County, 47% were in the city of Dallas. That year, 3.6% of the foreign-born in Dallas were from El Salvador. There is a small Salvadoran settlement in East Dallas. As of 2009, in Irving the Salvadoran-origin people are 11.8% of those born outside of the United States; this percentage is larger than the average percentage of Salvadorans in Dallas–Fort Worth area cities. There are also Salvadoran populations in Farmers Branch and Garland.

In the 1990s the number of people of Salvadoran origins increased by 172%. As of 2009, many Salvadorans work legally in the U.S. due to their "Temporary Protected Status". The Consulate of El Salvador is in central Dallas.

=== Black and African Americans ===
The Dallas–Fort Worth metroplex gained approximately 233,000 new African-Americans between 2000 and 2010. Second only behind Atlanta, Georgia during that time span.

In northern DFW suburbs, the black population rate has grown 178 percent since the 1990s. The strongest growth is in the southern suburbs, for example Cedar Hill was approximately 51.9 percent black in 2010, after a gain of more than 12,500 new black residents since the last decade. The southern suburbs (DeSoto, Duncanville, Lancaster, Cedar Hill) have been noted as the core of the African American middle class and upper middle class community in the Metroplex. Historically, the black community was strongly concentrated in the inner-city of Dallas and Fort Worth but that has slowly changed since the 1980s. In addition to the New Great Migration, many African Americans began moving to Dallas and Fort Worth for affordable cost of living and job opportunities.

==== Nigerians ====
As of 2000, of the recent Nigerian immigrant population in DFW, 61% live in Dallas County, and of the total number in Dallas County 49% live within the Dallas city limits. DFW has one of the largest Nigerian American populations in the country. Nigerians have a strong presence among top performers at the local universities in the Dallas–Fort Worth–Arlington metropolitan area.

The main area of Nigerian settlement in Dallas, also occupied by African Americans, includes a market frequented by Nigerians, a Nigerian-centered restaurant, and many rental units. It is in proximity to U.S. Highway 75.

==== Ethiopians ====
As of 2012 there are about 35,000 Ethiopians in the DFW area. Every year Ethiopian Day is held in Plano; the Mutual Assistance Association for Ethiopian Community organizes this festival. As of 2012 there were several Ethiopian restaurants in Dallas.

=== Asian Americans ===
The Asian American community, alongside other groups, has remained steadily growing in the area. The Greater Dallas Asian American Chamber serves the DFW Asian community. The Asian American Heritage Festival is held every year.

==== Chinese ====
According to the 2000 U.S. census, 5,762 ethnic Chinese lived in Dallas County.

Plano, along with Houston, has one of the state's two major settlements of Chinese Americans. As of 2011, 5% Plano's population is ethnic Chinese. As of the 2000 U.S. census, of the foreign-born residents of Plano, 17% originated from China. Richardson also has a Chinese immigrant community. In 2010 over 15% of the people in Richardson are ethnic Chinese. The D-FW China Town is located in Richardson.

==== Filipinos ====
There are over 80,000 Filipinos in the Dallas–Fort Worth metroplex. Dallas held its first Filipino food festival in 2020 and there are Filipino grocery stores in the Metroplex.

==== Indians ====
In 2000, a number slightly over 50% of the Asian Indians in the DFW area lived in Dallas County, and almost 20% lived in Collin County. Most Indians live in suburbs northwest, north, and east of Dallas. Many Indians work for telecommunications companies, Electronic Data Systems (EDS), and Texas Instruments, and Asian Indians tend to live near their workplaces. They also tend to live in public school districts with good reputations.

As of 2000, 40% of the Asian Indians in Dallas County lived in the city of Dallas. The remainder lived in suburban cities. Of the suburbs in the DFW area, Richardson in Dallas County had one of the earliest Indian settlements. As of 2009 the largest Asian ethnic group in Irving is the Asian Indians. As of 2009 the Indians have mainly settled into an area in western Irving along Texas State Highway 114. In order to absorb the Indian population, dense condominium and rental properties have opened in western Irving. This area is in proximity to high technology companies. Mesquite has a group of Indian Americans, mostly Kerala-origin Indian Christians. Their settlement, one of the earliest of the Indian Americans in DFW, was influenced by proximity to Dallas-based hospitals such as Baylor University Medical Center at Dallas and Parkland Hospital.

As of 2000, of the foreign-born residents of Plano, 9% originated from India. The reputation of the Plano Independent School District has attracted many Indian residents.

Recently, there has been a huge influx of Asian Indians in Frisco and Allen. Asian Indians make up the majority of the population in many subdivisions in Frisco. There are also sizable Asian Indian communities in Flower Mound, Murphy and Carrollton.

The India Association of North Texas headquarters are in Richardson. The Roman Catholic Diocese of Dallas operates the St. Thomas the Apostle Indian Catholic Church, a Syro-Malabar church, in Garland. It also operates the St. Mary Malankara Catholic Church, also in Garland, established in 1993.

==== Koreans ====
As of 2014 there were about 86,000 ethnic Koreans in North Texas.

The Korean Society of Dallas serves the Korean community. There is a South Korean consular office in Dallas. The office opened in June 2013 and is the first consul officer is Dong-Chan Kim.

As of 2012 there was a dispute between ethnic Korean business owners and African-Americans in the DFW area. Mayor of Dallas Mike Rawlings attempted to mediate this dispute. American Airlines began nonstop flights from Dallas–Fort Worth International Airport to Incheon Airport near Seoul in May 2013. In January 2014 Shin-Soo Choo was scheduled to visit Dallas.

The Roman Catholic Diocese of Dallas maintains a Korean mission at St. Andrew Kim Church in Dallas, established in 1977.

==== Pakistanis ====
There are an estimated 19,000 Pakistanis living in the Dallas-Fort Worth metroplex. Many Pakistanis have immigrated since the 1970s, with the first organization for Pakistani-Americans in DFW dating back to 1984. Over 60% are college graduates in the US and there are many Pakistani-American physicians, engineers, accountants, computer scientists, engineers, etc. They have been heavily involved in building mosques. There are both Sunni and Shia (including Ismaili) Pakistanis in Dallas-Fort Worth. They are in many cities, including Dallas, Plano, Frisco, Allen, Richardson, Carrollton, Arlington, Irving, Euless, Bedford, etc.

==== Vietnamese ====
As of 2014, the DFW area has almost 72,000 people of Vietnamese origins.

As of 2000 12% of the foreign-born population of Garland originated from Vietnam. There are two strip-style shopping malls along Walnut Street that cater to Vietnamese people, and there is also a community center that as of 2009 hosts first generation Vietnamese immigrants. Garland Road serves as a center of the Vietnamese community. During the same year, 14% of the foreign-born population of Arlington originated from Vietnam. Within Arlington most Vietnamese live in the southern portion. That year 4% of the foreign-born of Plano originated in Vietnam. As of 2009 there is also a first-generation Vietnamese population in East Dallas, in the "Little Asia" area. As of 2000 there are fewer Vietnamese in the northern suburbs, which are wealthier compared to other parts of the DFW area.

The first people of Vietnamese origins began arriving in the DFW area in the 1970s. They were refugees from the Vietnam War.

The St. Peter Vietnamese Catholic Church in Dallas opened in 1998. It, as of 2014, has about 1,350 members and 75 families. As of that year, Pham Minh is the pastor. St. Peter opened because the Vietnamese congregation at St. Pius X Church, which began taking in Vietnamese in 1975, had become so large. There are other Vietnamese missions at Mother of Perpetual Help Church in Garland, established in 1992; Sacred Heart of Jesus Church in Carrollton, established in 1998; St. Joseph Vietnamese Catholic Church in Grand Prairie, established in 1995, and the St. Joseph Vietnamese Missionary Center in Dallas.

After the 2014 opening of the Banh Shop, a Vietnamese-style restaurant owned by Yum! Brands, a petition that asked for a change of the restaurant's logo opened. This petition argued that the logo was too similar to the star of the Vietnamese Communist Party. The president of the Vietnamese-American Community of Greater Dallas, Thanh Cung, signed this petition. As a result, the company changed the logo.

==== Japanese ====
The Japanese School of Dallas operates in the DFW area.

In 1978 W.L. Taitte stated in Texas Monthly that Japanese people in the Dallas area preferred going to the Fuji-ya and Mihama-ya restaurants when they wanted Japanese cuisine.

== Religion ==
The Dallas–Fort Worth metroplex's religious population are predominantly Christian and it is the largest metro area that identifies with the religion in the United States (78%). Methodist, Baptist, Presbyterian, and Catholic churches are prominent in many cities and towns in the metropolitan region. The Methodist, Baptist, and Roman Catholic denominations all support private universities here. In order of size, they are Southern Methodist University, Dallas Baptist University, and the Catholic University of Dallas. Non-Christian faiths including Islam, Judaism, Hinduism, Sikhism, Buddhism, and contemporary paganism collectively form a little over 4% of the religious population. Dallas Fort-Worth also hosts the largest Mosque in Texas, the Islamic Center of Irving.

== LGBT ==
The Dallas–Fort Worth area has a robust and diverse LGBT population. The Oak Lawn/Cedar Springs Area has historically had a large LGBT population. Many neighborhoods in Central Dallas have a growing LGBT presence.

== See also ==
- Demographics of Dallas
- Demographics of Texas
- Demographics of Houston
- Demographics of San Antonio
