= Statue of Christopher Columbus (Houston) =

Bronze sculpture in Bell Park, Houston, Texas, U.S.

- Artist: Joe Incrapera
- Year: 1992
- Medium: Bronze sculpture
- Subject: Christopher Columbus
- Location: Houston, Texas, United States; 29.729544°N 95.391632°W

An outdoor 1992 bronze sculpture of Christopher Columbus by Joe Incrapera was installed in Houston's Bell Park, in the U.S. state of Texas. It was later removed in 2020 after a history of vandalism.

== History ==
The sculpture was vandalized with red paint in August 2017. The Houston Chronicle noted that the vandalism occurred around the same time that protesters demanded the removal of Confederate monuments and memorials in Houston, and the same day that the city's statue of Martin Luther King Jr. was vandalized with white paint.

On June 11, 2020, the statue was vandalized again, with red paint covering its face, neck area and hands and a red circled "A" painted on its rear. This time, however, the statue was also holding a cardboard sign stating "Rip the head from your oppressor." That evening, the statue's left hand was cut off. The statue was then removed on June 19, 2020.

== See also ==
- 1992 in art
- Ethnic groups in Houston – discusses Italian Americans in Houston
- List of monuments and memorials to Christopher Columbus
- List of monuments and memorials removed during the George Floyd protests
- List of public art in Houston
