= Demographics of Dallas =

Dallas is the ninth-most populous city in the U.S. and third in Texas after Houston and San Antonio. At the 2010 U.S. census, Dallas had a population of 1,197,816. In July 2018, the population estimate of the city of Dallas was 1,345,076, an increase of 147,260 since the 2010 United States census.

== Statistics ==
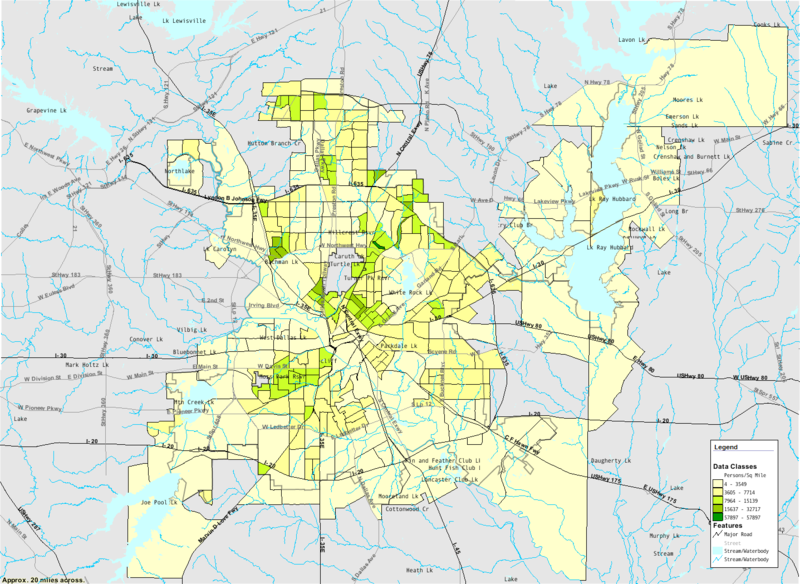
Population density map per 2000 US Census

=== 2000-2010 ===
At the 2000 census there were 1,188,580 people, 451,833 households, and 266,580 families residing in Dallas proper. The population density was 3,470 people per square mile (1,340 people/km^{2}). There were 484,117 housing units at an average density of 1,413.3 units per square mile (545.7 units/km^{2}). Of the 451,833 households 30.3% had children under the age of 18 living with them, 38.8% were married couples living together, 14.9% had a female householder with no husband present, and 41.0% are classified as non-families by the United States Census Bureau. Of 451,833 households, 23,959 are unmarried partner households: 18,684 heterosexual, 3,615 same-sex male, and 1,660 same-sex female households. 32.9% of households were one person and 6.5% were one person aged 65 or older. The average household size was 2.58 and the average family size was 3.37.

Historical populations
| Census | Pop. | Note | %± |
|---|---|---|---|
| 1860 | 678 | | — |
| 1870 | 3,000 | | 342.5% |
| 1880 | 10,358 | | 245.3% |
| 1890 | 38,067 | | 267.5% |
| 1900 | 42,639 | | 12.0% |
| 1910 | 92,104 | | 116.0% |
| 1920 | 158,976 | | 72.6% |
| 1930 | 260,475 | | 63.8% |
| 1940 | 294,734 | | 13.2% |
| 1950 | 434,462 | | 47.4% |
| 1960 | 679,684 | | 56.4% |
| 1970 | 844,401 | | 24.2% |
| 1980 | 904,078 | | 7.1% |
| 1990 | 1,006,877 | | 11.4% |
| 2000 | 1,188,580 | | 18.0% |
| 2010 | 1,197,816 | | 0.8% |
| 2020 | 1,304,379 | | 8.9% |

The age distribution was 26.6% under the age of 18, 11.8% from 18 to 24, 35.3% from 25 to 44, 17.7% from 45 to 64, and 8.6% 65 or older. The median age was 30 years. For every 100 females, there were 101.6 males. For every 100 females age 18 and over, there were 100.5 males.

The median household income was $37,628 and the median family income was $40,921. Males had a median income of $31,149, versus $28,235 for females. The per capita income for the city was $22,183. About 14.9% of families and 17.8% of the population were below the poverty line, including 25.1% of those under age 18 and 13.1% of those aged 65 or over. In 2006 the median price for a house was $123,800, and save a 2003 recession, Dallas had seen a steady increase in the cost of homes over the past 6 years since.

Dallas's population was 1,197,816 in 2010. The city had 458,057 households. In 2010, 33.7% of all households had one or more people under 18 years of age, and 17.6% had one or more people who were 65 years of age or older. The city's age distribution of the population showed 26.5% under the age of 18 and 8.8% who were 65 years of age or older. The median age was 31.8 years. 50.0% of the population was male and 50.0% was female.

=== 2018 ===
The American Community Survey determined Dallas had a population of 1,345,076 in 2018. There were 521,198 households at the 2018 estimates, up from 2010's 458,057 households, out of which 137,758 had children under the age of 18 living with them. The owner-occupied housing rate was 40.2% and the renter-occupied housing rate was 59.8%. The median age 33.3 years. For every 100 females, there were 99.2 males. 2018's median income for a household in the city was $52,210.

=== 2020 census ===
Dallas city, Texas – Racial and ethnic composition Note: the U.S. census treats Hispanic/Latino as an ethnic category. This table excludes Latinos from the racial categories and assigns them to a separate category. Hispanics/Latinos may be of any race.
| Race / Ethnicity (NH = Non-Hispanic) | Pop 2000 | Pop 2010 | Pop 2020 | % 2000 | % 2010 | % 2020 |
|---|---|---|---|---|---|---|
| White alone (NH) | 410,777 | 342,205 | 366,393 | 34.56% | 28.82% | 28.09% |
| Black or African American alone (NH) | 304,824 | 294,159 | 298,764 | 25.65% | 24.56% | 22.90% |
| Native American or Alaska Native alone (NH) | 3,705 | 3,167 | 2,933 | 0.31% | 0.26% | 0.22% |
| Asian alone (NH) | 31,626 | 33,609 | 47,820 | 2.66% | 2.81% | 3.67% |
| Pacific Islander alone (NH) | 367 | 311 | 458 | 0.03% | 0.03% | 0.04% |
| Some Other Race alone (NH) | 1,254 | 1,824 | 4,995 | 0.11% | 0.15% | 0.38% |
| Mixed Race or Multi-Racial (NH) | 13,440 | 12,232 | 31,842 | 1.13% | 1.02% | 2.44% |
| Hispanic or Latino (any race) | 422,587 | 507,309 | 551,174 | 35.55% | 42.35% | 42.26% |
| Total | 1,188,580 | 1,197,816 | 1,304,379 | 100.00% | 100.00% | 100.00% |

Historical racial demographics of Dallas County
| Demographic profile | 1850 | 1860 | 1870 | 1880 | 1900 | 1910 | 1920 | 1930 | 1940 | 1950 | 1960 | 1970 | 1980 | 1990 | 2000 | 2010 | 2020 |
|---|---|---|---|---|---|---|---|---|---|---|---|---|---|---|---|---|---|
| Non-Hispanic White alone | 100.0% | 100.0% | 66.3% | 83.2% | 82.0% | 79.7% | 84.0% | 82.6% | 81.0% | 83.3% | 81.1% | – | – | – | 44.2% | 32.9% | 30.8% |
| Non-Hispanic Asian and Pacific Islander alone | – | – | – | – | – | – | – | – | – | – | – | – | – | – | 4.2% | 5.0% | 6.6% |
| Hispanic or Latino, any race(s) | 0.0% | 0.0% | 0.0% | 0.7% | 0.4% | 1.9% | 2.5% | 3.0% | 3.0% | 2.7% | 4.4% | – | – | – | 30.5% | 38.4% | 39.4% |
| Non-Hispanic Black alone | 0.0% | 0.0% | 26.7% | 16.1% | 17.6% | 18.3% | 13.5% | 14.4% | 16.0% | 13.9% | 14.3% | – | – | – | 19.7% | 21.8% | 19.9% |
| Non-Hispanic Other | – | – | – | – | – | – | – | – | – | – | – | – | – | – | 1.2% | 1.7% | 3.1% |
| Non-Hispanic Native American alone | – | – | – | – | – | – | – | – | – | – | – | – | – | – | – | – | – |
| Non-Hispanic Two or more races | – | – | – | – | – | – | – | – | – | – | – | – | – | – | – | – | – |

At the 2010 census the racial makeup of Dallas was 50.7% White, 25.0% Black or African American, 0.5% Native American, 2.9% Asian, 0.1% Pacific Islander, 17.2% from other races, and 2.7% from two or more races. 42.4% of the population was Hispanic or Latino of any race. Non Hispanic whites made up 28.8% of the city of Dallas. Hispanic-blacks for the first time in the 2000 census as the largest minority group in Dallas. The city has historically been predominantly white but its population diversified as it grew in size and importance over the 20th century. Almost 25% of Dallas' population is foreign born. The largest minority group in the city are Hispanics and Latinos—Dallas is a major destination for Mexican immigrants seeking opportunity in the United States because of its relative proximity to the U.S.-Mexico border. The southwest area of the city, especially Oak Cliff, is predominantly or completely Hispanic. The southern and southeastern areas of the city, especially Pleasant Grove and South Dallas, share predominantly black and Hispanic residents even though much of South Dallas is considered to be predominantly black. The far north parts of the city are white and the northwestern, northeastern portion of the city is home to predominantly Hispanics, while blacks and Asians share a small mix of population in the same area. The city also contains localized populations of Chinese, Korean, Persian, Indian, Bangladeshi, Pakistani, German, Arab, Polish, Russian, Romanian and Jewish people.

In the United States Census Bureau's 2018 estimates, 29.3% were non-Hispanic white, 24.8% Black or African American, 0.2% American Indian or Alaska Native, 3.4% Asian, and 1.5% from two or more races. Hispanics or Latinos of any race made up 40.7% of the estimated population in 2018. Among the Hispanic or Latin American population in 2018, 34.0% of Dallas was Mexican, 0.4% Puerto Rican, 0.2% Cuban and 5.9% other Hispanic or Latino. In 2017's American Community Survey estimates among the demographic 36% were Mexican, 0.5% Puerto Rican, 0.3% Cuban, and 4.9% other Hispanic or Latino.

== Languages ==
According to the 2022 American Community Survey, the most commonly spoken languages in Dallas by people aged 5 years and over (1,207,230 people):

- Speak only English: 57.4%
- Language other than English: 42.6%
- Spanish: 36.3%
- Other Indo-European languages: 2.4%
- Other languages: 2%
- Asian languages and Pacific Island languages: 1.9%

== Religion ==
According to a 2014 study by the Pew Research Center, Christianity is the most prevalent religion in Dallas and its metropolitan statistical area (78%).

== See also ==
- Demographics of Dallas-Fort Worth
- Demographics of Texas
- Demographics of Houston
- Demographics of San Antonio
