= American Indian Genocide Museum =

Coordinates: 29.6133°N 95.2229°W

- Established: 2003; 23 years ago
- Location: Houston, Texas, USA
- Type: History museum
- Director: Steve Melendez
- Website: aigenom.org

The American Indian Genocide Museum is a museum located in Houston, Texas that is dedicated to documenting the atrocities committed against the American Indians.

== Mission ==
The museum is dedicated to documenting the near extermination or total extinction of Native American tribes and peoples. It is designed to raise public awareness of the genocidal policies against indigenous peoples in United States.

== Location ==
The museum is located in Houston, Texas. Texas was chosen since the state had gone further than any other state, running all but a few tribes out, or otherwise eliminating them.

== Collections and exhibits ==
The museum has a number of unique exhibits, such as an invoice for smallpox infected blankets that were given to the Delaware tribe, to an account that alleges Texas soldiers intentionally infecting Indians and then releasing them to go back to their tribes.

== Public activism ==
In 2011, the president of the museum commented on the protest of some African-American groups over a proposed Confederate flag specialty license plate in Texas while supporting a Buffalo soldiers plate. Steve Melendez, a Paiute, noted that while the furor over the Confederate flag was understandable, American Indians felt the same way about the Buffalo soldiers. The museum also protests Buffalo soldier recreation groups, noting that it is as if "as if hunting our people down and forcing them onto reservations was at one time, the patriotic thing to do.

== See also ==
- Ethnic groups in Houston which includes a section about Native Americans in the city
- National Day of Mourning
