= Bell Park (Houston) =

Park in Houston, Texas

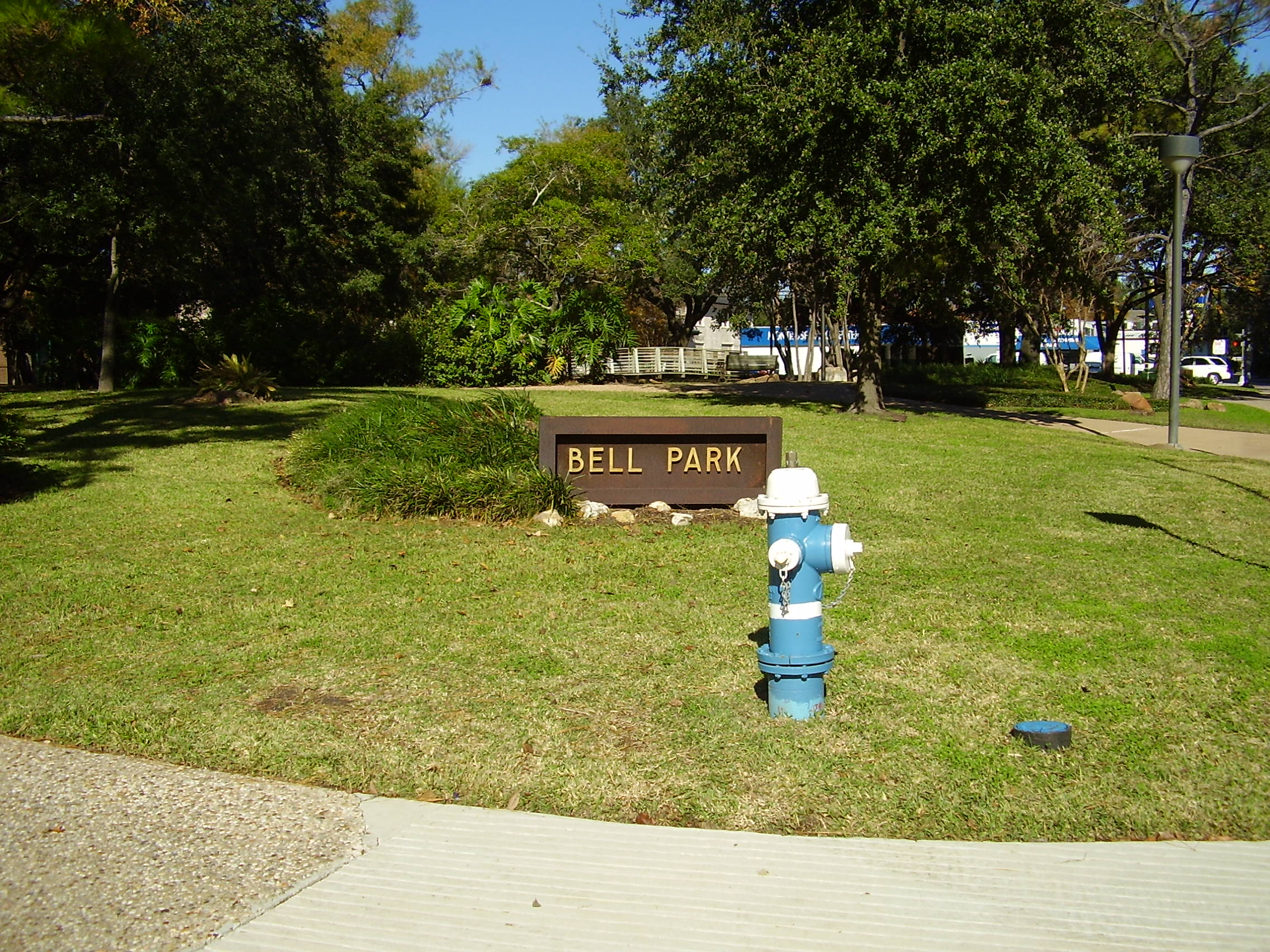
- The park in 2009

- Location within Texas
- Interactive map of Bell Park
- Type: Park
- Location: Houston, Texas, U.S.
- Coordinates: 29.7297°N 95.3916°W
- Area: 1.15 acres (0.47 ha)

Bell Park is a 1.15-acre park along Montrose Boulevard in Houston, in the U.S. state of Texas. It is named for C.C. Bell, who donated the park land to the city.

The park features a statue of Christopher Columbus, donated to the city in 1992 by the group Italian-American Organizations of Greater Houston. In recent years the statue has become a target for vandalism as Columbus has grown controversial.
