= Nigeria =

Country in West Africa

Federal Republic of Nigeria
(in recognised languages)
Hausa	Jamhuriyar Tarayyar Najeriya
Igbo	Ọ̀hàńjíkọ̀ Ọ̀hànézè Naìjíríyà
Yoruba	Orílẹ̀-èdè Olómìniira Àpapọ̀ Nàìjíríà
- Flag Coat of arms
- Motto: "Unity and Faith, Peace and Progress"
- Anthem: "Nigeria, We Hail Thee"
- Capital: Abuja; 9°4′N 7°29′E
- Largest city: Lagos
- Official languages: English
- Recognised languages: List (Note: Nigeria recognises many indigenous languages, with Hausa, Yoruba, and Igbo among the most widely spoken across different regions.): Hausa; Yoruba; Igbo
- Regional languages: Over 525 languages
- Ethnic groups (2018): 30% Hausa; 15.5% Yoruba; 15.2% Igbo; 6% Fulani; 2.4% Tiv; 2.4% Kanuri; 1.8% Ibibio; 1.8% Ijaw; 24.7% others
- Religion (2018): 53.5% Islam; 45.9% Christianity; 35.3% Protestantism; 10.6% Catholicism; 0.6% other
- Demonym: Nigerian
- Government: Federal presidential republic
  - President: Bola Tinubu
  - Vice President: Kashim Shettima
  - Senate President: Godswill Akpabio
  - House Speaker: Tajudeen Abbas
  - Chief Justice: Kudirat Kekere-Ekun
- Legislature: National Assembly
  - Upper house: Senate
  - Lower house: House of Representatives

Independence from the United Kingdom
  - Northern Nigeria Protectorate: 1 January 1900
  - Southern Nigeria Protectorate: 1 January 1900
  - Unification of Nigeria: 1 January 1914
  - Declared independent as a sovereign state: 1 October 1960
  - Became a republic: 1 October 1963
  - Current constitution: 29 May 1999

Area
  - Total: 923,769 km^{2} (356,669 sq mi) (31st)
  - Water (%): 1.4

Population
  - 2026 estimate: ▲242,747,130 (6th)
  - Density: 249.8/km^{2} (647.0/sq mi) (57th)
- GDP (PPP): 2026 estimate
  - Total: ▲$2.438 trillion (19th)
  - Per capita: ▲$10,051 (135th)
- GDP (nominal): 2026 estimate
  - Total: ▲$386.671 billion (46th)
  - Per capita: ▲$1,594 (173rd)
- Gini (2020): ▼35.1 medium inequality
- HDI (2023): ▲0.560 medium (164th)
- Currency: Naira (₦) (NGN)
- Time zone: UTC+01:00 (WAT)
- Date format: dd/mm/yyyy
- Calling code: +234
- ISO 3166 code: NG
- Internet TLD: .ng

Nigeria, (Note: /naɪˈdʒɪəriə/ ny-JEER-ee-ə; Hausa: Najeriya Hausa pronunciation: [nàː.(d)ʒéː.rí.jàː], Igbo: Naìjíríyà, Yoruba: Nàìjíríà, Nigerian Pidgin: Naijá [ˈnaɪ.dʒə], Fula: Naajeeriya, Tyap: Naijeriya) officially the Federal Republic of Nigeria, is a country in West Africa between the Sahel to the north and the Gulf of Guinea in the Atlantic Ocean to the south. It covers an area of 923,769 square kilometres (356,669 mi^{2}). With a population of more than 242 million, it is the most populous country in Africa, and the world's sixth-most populous country. Nigeria borders Niger in the north, Chad in the northeast, Cameroon in the east, and Benin in the west. Nigeria is a federal republic comprising 36 states and the Federal Capital Territory, where its capital, Abuja, is located. The largest city in Nigeria by population is Lagos, one of the largest metropolitan areas in the world and the second largest in Africa.

Nigeria is a multinational state inhabited by more than 250 ethnic groups speaking 500 distinct languages, all identifying with a wide variety of cultures. The three largest ethnic groups are the Hausa, Yoruba, and Igbo, together constituting over 60% of the total population. The official language is English. Nigeria's constitution ensures freedom of religion. The country is divided roughly in half between Muslims and Christians; indigenous religions, such as those native to the Igbo and Yoruba ethnicities, are in the minority.

Nigeria has been home to several indigenous material cultures, pre-colonial states and kingdoms since the second millennium BC. The Nok culture, c. 1500 BC, marks one of the earliest known civilisations in the region. The Hausa Kingdoms inhabited the north, with the Edo Kingdom of Benin in the south, the Igbo Kingdom of Nri in the southeast, and in the southwest the Yoruba Empire of Oyo. The present-day territory of Nigeria was home to a vast array of city-states. In the early 19th century, the Fulani Jihads culminated in the Sokoto Caliphate. The modern state originated with British colonialization in the 19th century, taking its present territorial shape with the merging of the Southern Nigeria Protectorate and the Northern Nigeria Protectorate in 1914. The British set up administrative and legal structures and incorporated traditional monarchs as a form of indirect rule.

Nigeria officially gained independence as a federation on 1 October 1960. From 1967 to 1970, the country was ravaged by civil war, followed by a series of military dictatorships (as well as an unstable democracy from 1979 to 1983), until a stable democracy was established in 1999. However, the work of the Nigerian Electoral Commission (INEC) has been criticised both nationally and internationally for lacking transparency.

Nigeria is one of Africa’s largest economies, alongside South Africa and Egypt. It is regarded as an emerging market by the World Bank. Nigeria is a regional power in Africa and a middle power in international affairs. Nigeria is a founding member of the African Union and a member of many international organisations, including the United Nations, the Commonwealth of Nations, NAM, the Economic Community of West African States, Organisation of Islamic Cooperation and OPEC.

== Etymology ==
The name Nigeria derives from the Niger River running through the country. This name was coined on 8 January 1897, by the British journalist Flora Shaw. The neighbouring Republic of Niger takes its name from the same river. The origin of the name Niger, which originally applied to only the middle reaches of the Niger River, is uncertain. The word is likely an alteration of the Tuareg name egerew n-igerewen ("river of rivers") used by inhabitants along the middle reaches of the river around Timbuktu before 19th-century European colonialism. Before Flora Shaw suggested the name Nigeria, other proposed names included Royal Niger Company Territories, Central Sudan, Niger Empire, Niger Sudan, and Hausa Territories.

== History ==
=== Prehistory ===
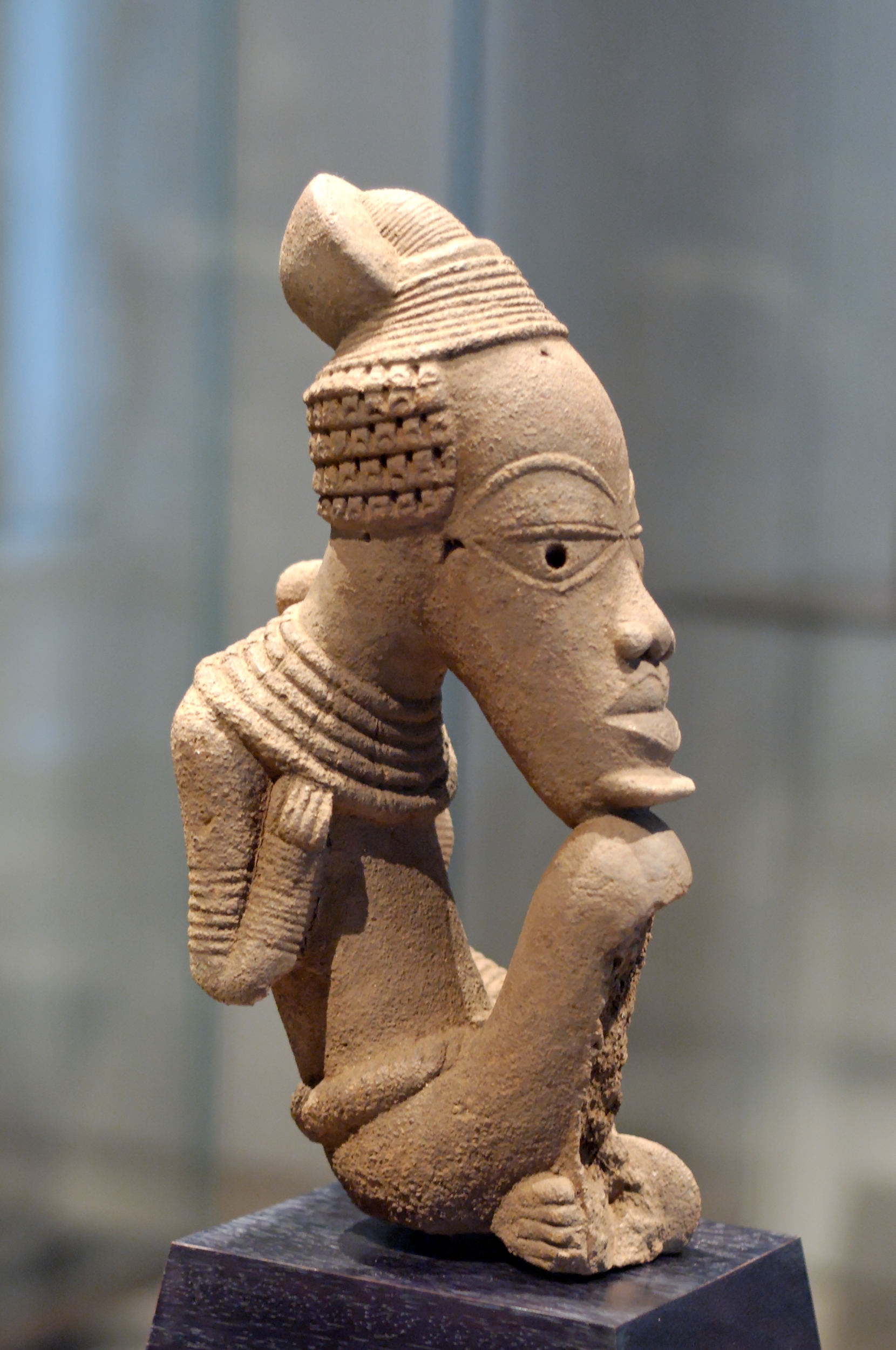
Nok sculpture, terracotta

Kainji Dam excavations showed ironworking by the 2nd century BC. The transition from Neolithic times to the Iron Age was accomplished without intermediate bronze production. Some have suggested the technology moved west from the Nile Valley. But the Iron Age in the Niger River valley and the forest region appears to predate the introduction of metallurgy in the upper savanna by more than 800 years, as well as predating it in the Nile Valley. More recent research suggests that iron metallurgy was developed independently in Africa.

The Nok civilisation thrived between 1500 BC and 200 AD. It produced life-sized terracotta figures that are some of the earliest known sculptures in Africa and independently invented iron smelting by about 550 BC and possibly a few centuries earlier. Evidence of iron smelting has also been excavated at sites in the Nsukka region of southeast Nigeria: dating to 2000 BC at the site of Lejja and to 750 BC at the site of Opi.

=== Early history ===
The Kano Chronicle highlights an ancient history dating to around 999 AD of the Hausa city state of Kano, with other major Hausa cities (or Hausa Bakwai) of Daura, Biram, Katsina, Kingdom of Zazzau, Rano, and Gobir all having recorded histories dating back to the 10th century.

The Kingdom of Nri of the Igbo people consolidated in the 10th century and continued until it lost its sovereignty to the British in 1911. Nri was ruled by the Eze Nri, and the city of Nri is considered to be the foundation of Igbo culture. Nri and Aguleri, where the Igbo creation myth originates, are in the territory of the Umeuri clan. Members of the clan trace their lineages back to the patriarchal king-figure Eri. In West Africa, the oldest bronzes made using the lost wax process were from Igbo-Ukwu, a city under Nri influence.

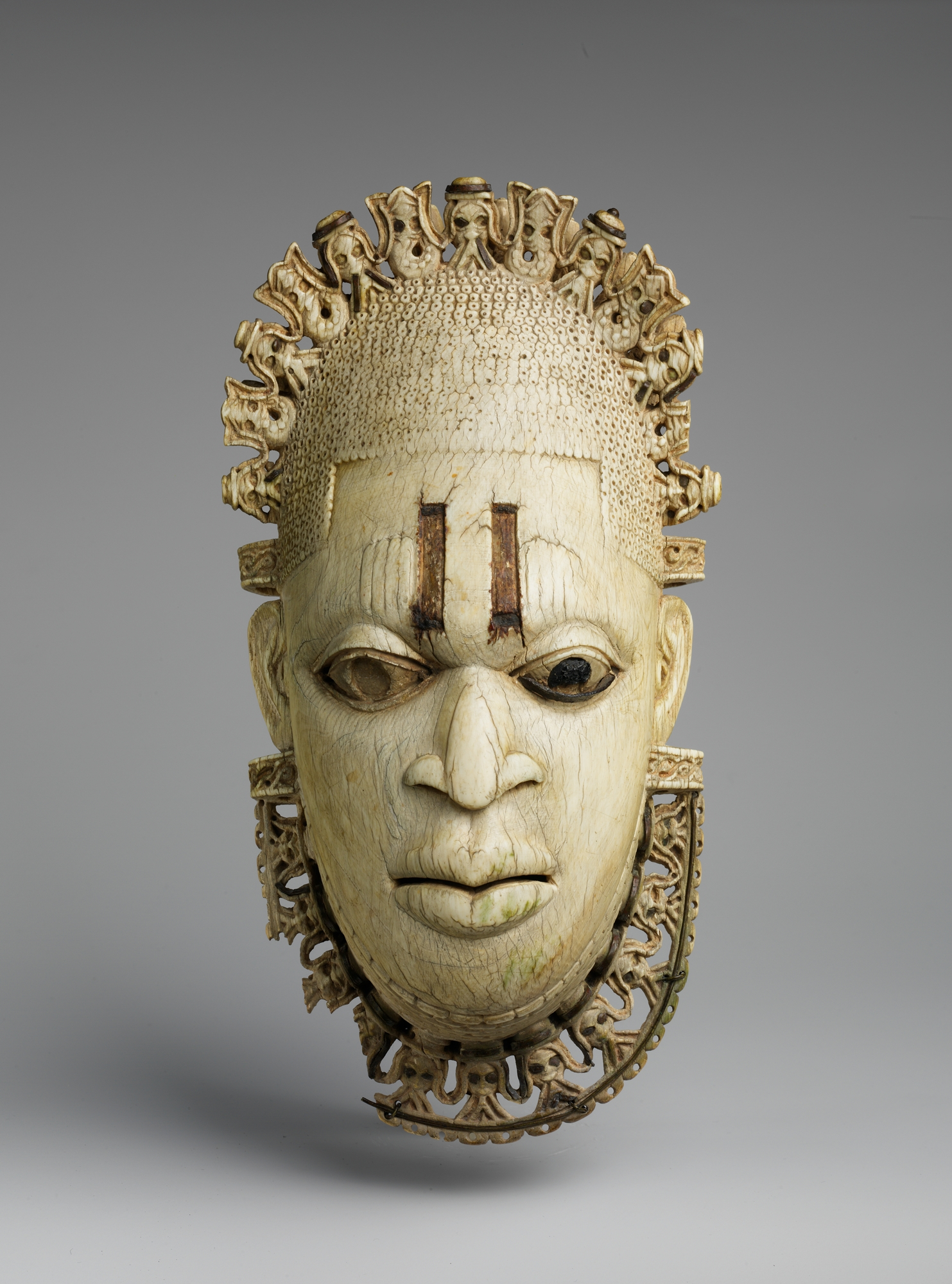
Royal Benin ivory mask, one of Nigeria's most recognised artifacts. Benin Empire, 16th century.

The Yoruba had developed one of the earliest city-states in Africa by the 8th century known as Ile Ife, which would become the heart of the later Ife Empire while Oyo and other Yoruba states became more prominent in the 12th and 14th centuries, respectively. The oldest signs of human settlement at Ife's current site date back to the 9th century, and its material culture includes Terracotta and Bronze figures. The Kingdom of Benin, founded by the Edo people, was a major West African power. Its densely populated capital (Benin City) served as a central hub for regional and transatlantic trade in cloth, ivory, pepper, and salt.

Written documentation of Nigerian history from native sources dates back to at least the 14th century. In the 1390s, Mai Biri III Uthman wrote a letter to Barquq, Sultan of Egypt at the time. He complained about slave raids on the local Muslim population by Judham Arabs, who he described as polytheists who deviated from true religion.

Al-Maghili lived for some time in both Katsina and Kano. While in Kano he wrote The Obligations of Princes for Muhammad Rumfa, the ruler of Kano in the late 15th century, which was a kind of constitution for how a Muslim should rule.

The Kanem–Bornu Empire was a long-lived major Islamic power in the region. Originally based in the Kanem region, the ruling dynasty relocated southwest to Borno in the late fourteenth century. Kanem–Bornu established extensive diplomatic and trade networks reaching North Africa and Europe. Under rulers such as Mai Idris Alooma, much of Hausaland was brought into tributary status under Borno.

=== Pre-colonial era ===
In the 16th century, Portuguese explorers were the first Europeans to begin important, direct trade with the peoples of southern Nigeria, at the port they named Lagos (formerly Eko) in Yoruba land and in Calabar along the region Slave Coast. Europeans traded goods with peoples at the coast; coastal trade with Europeans also marked the beginnings of the Atlantic slave trade. The port of Calabar on the historical Bight of Biafra (now commonly referred to as the Bight of Bonny) became one of the largest slave-trading posts in West Africa in this era. Other major slaving ports were located in Badagry, Lagos on the Bight of Benin, and Bonny Island on the Bight of Biafra. The majority of those taken to these ports were captured in raids and wars. Usually, the captives were taken back to the conquerors' territory as forced labour; they were sometimes gradually acculturated and absorbed into the conquerors' society. Slave routes were established throughout Nigeria linking the hinterland areas with the major coastal ports. Several kingdoms that directly or indirectly participated in the Atlantic slave trade were the Benin Empire in the south, the Oyo Empire in the southwest, and the Aro Confederacy in the southeast. In contrast, the kingdoms associated with the Trans-Saharan slave trade were the Hausa states, as well as the Kanuri-led Kanem-Bornu Empire. Benin's power lasted between the 15th and 19th centuries. Oyo, at its territorial zenith in the late 17th to early 18th centuries, extended its influence from western Nigeria to modern-day Togo.

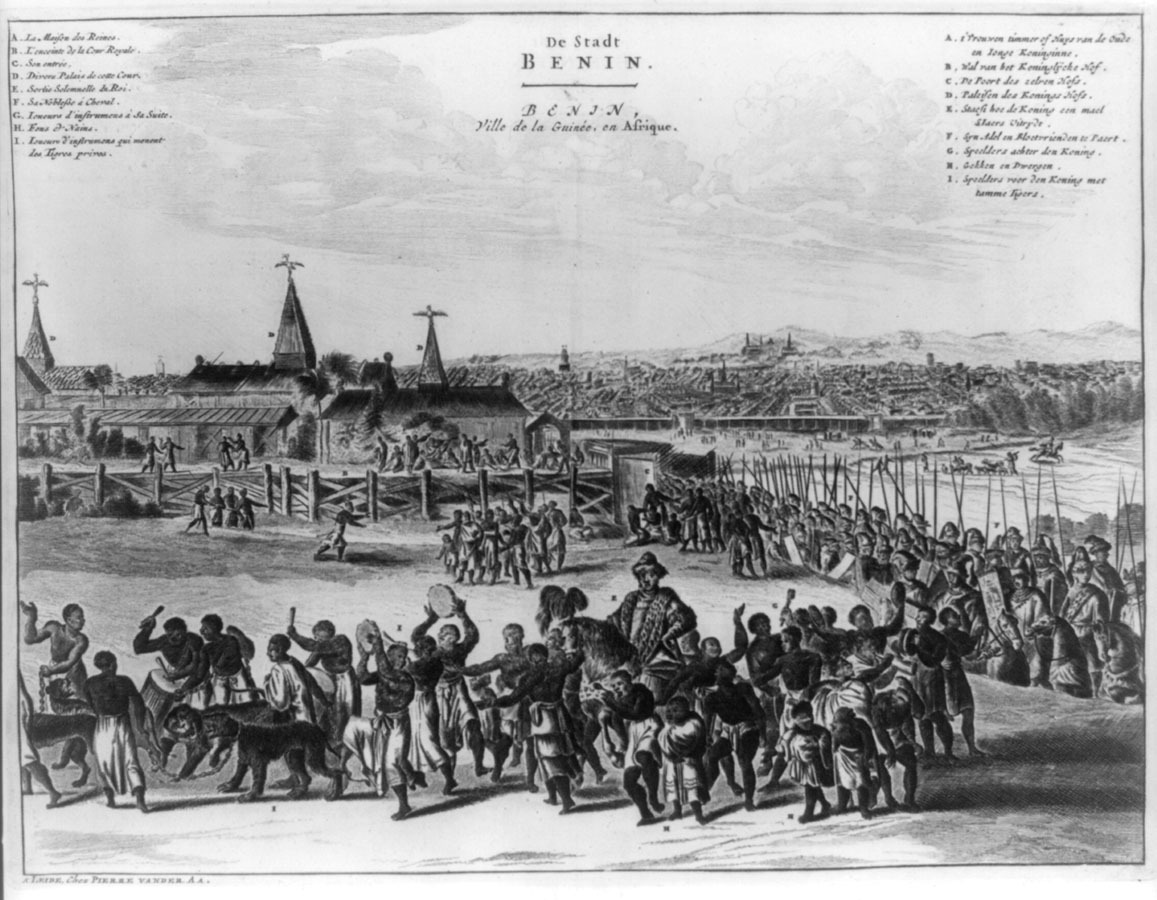
Depiction of Benin City by a Dutch illustrator in 1668. The wall-like structure in the centre probably represents the walls of Benin, housing the Benin bronze decorated historic Benin City Palace.

In the north, the incessant fighting amongst the Hausa city-states and the decline of the Bornu Empire allowed the Fulani people to gain headway into the region. Until this point, the Fulani, a nomadic foreign ethnic group, primarily traversed the semi-desert region with cattle. They largely avoided engaging in trade, agriculture, state-building, and other activities common among other West African peoples. At the beginning of the 19th century, Usman dan Fodio led a successful jihad against the Hausa Kingdoms, He accused the Hausa of not being true Muslims and subsequently established the Sokoto Caliphate. The Sokoto Caliphate relied heavily on slavery, with large-scale plantation slavery, concubinage, and domestic servitude. While the primary source of new slaves were the newly conquered Hausa peoples, raids on non-Muslim communities and other ethnic groups accused of not being true Muslims persisted. The caliphate as a whole became one of the largest slave societies in 19th-century Africa.

This Sokoto Caliphate grew rapidly under Usman's rule and that of his descendants, who sent out invading armies in every direction. The empire sought to link the eastern and western Sudan regions while attempting to expand southward into the Yoruba country. It conquered parts of the old Oyo Empire (modern-day Kwara), and attempted to penetrate deeper into the heart of Yorubaland. However, the Yoruba forces of Ibadan delivered a decisive defeat to the invaders at the Battle of Osogbo, halting their jihad and successfully protecting the sovereign integrity of Yoruba territory. The sultan sent out emirs to establish suzerainty over the previous conquered territories and promote Islamic civilisation; the emirs in turn became increasingly rich and powerful through trade and slavery. By the 1890s, the largest slave population, about two million, was concentrated in the territories of the Sokoto Caliphate. The use of slave labour was extensive, especially in agriculture. By the time of its break-up in 1903 into various European colonies, the Sokoto Caliphate was one of the largest pre-colonial African states.

A changing legal imperative (the outlawing of the Atlantic slave trade in 1807) and economic imperative (a desire for political and social stability) led most European powers to support the widespread cultivation of agricultural products, such as the palm, for use in European industry. The slave trade continued after the ban, as illegal smugglers purchased slaves along the coast from native slavers. Britain's West Africa Squadron sought to intercept the smugglers at sea. The rescued slaves were taken to Freetown, a colony in West Africa originally established for the resettlement of slaves freed by Britain.

=== British colonisation and independence ===
Flag of the Lagos Colony

Britain intervened in the Lagos kingship power struggle by bombarding Lagos in 1851, deposing the slave-trade-friendly Oba Kosoko, helping to install the amenable Oba Akitoye and signing the Treaty between Great Britain and Lagos on 1 January 1852. Britain annexed Lagos as a crown colony in August 1861 with the Lagos Treaty of Cession. British missionaries expanded their operations and travelled further inland. In 1864, Samuel Ajayi Crowther became the first African bishop of the Anglican Church. In 1885, British claims to a West African sphere of influence received recognition from other European nations at the Berlin Conference. The following year, it chartered the Royal Niger Company under the leadership of Sir George Taubman Goldie. By the late 19th and early 20th centuries, the company had vastly succeeded in subjugating the independent southern kingdoms along the Niger River, the British conquered Benin in 1897, and, in the Anglo-Aro War (1901–1902), defeated other opponents. The defeat of these states opened up the Niger area to British rule. In 1900, the company's territory came under the direct control of the British government and established the Southern Nigeria Protectorate as a British protectorate and part of the British Empire.

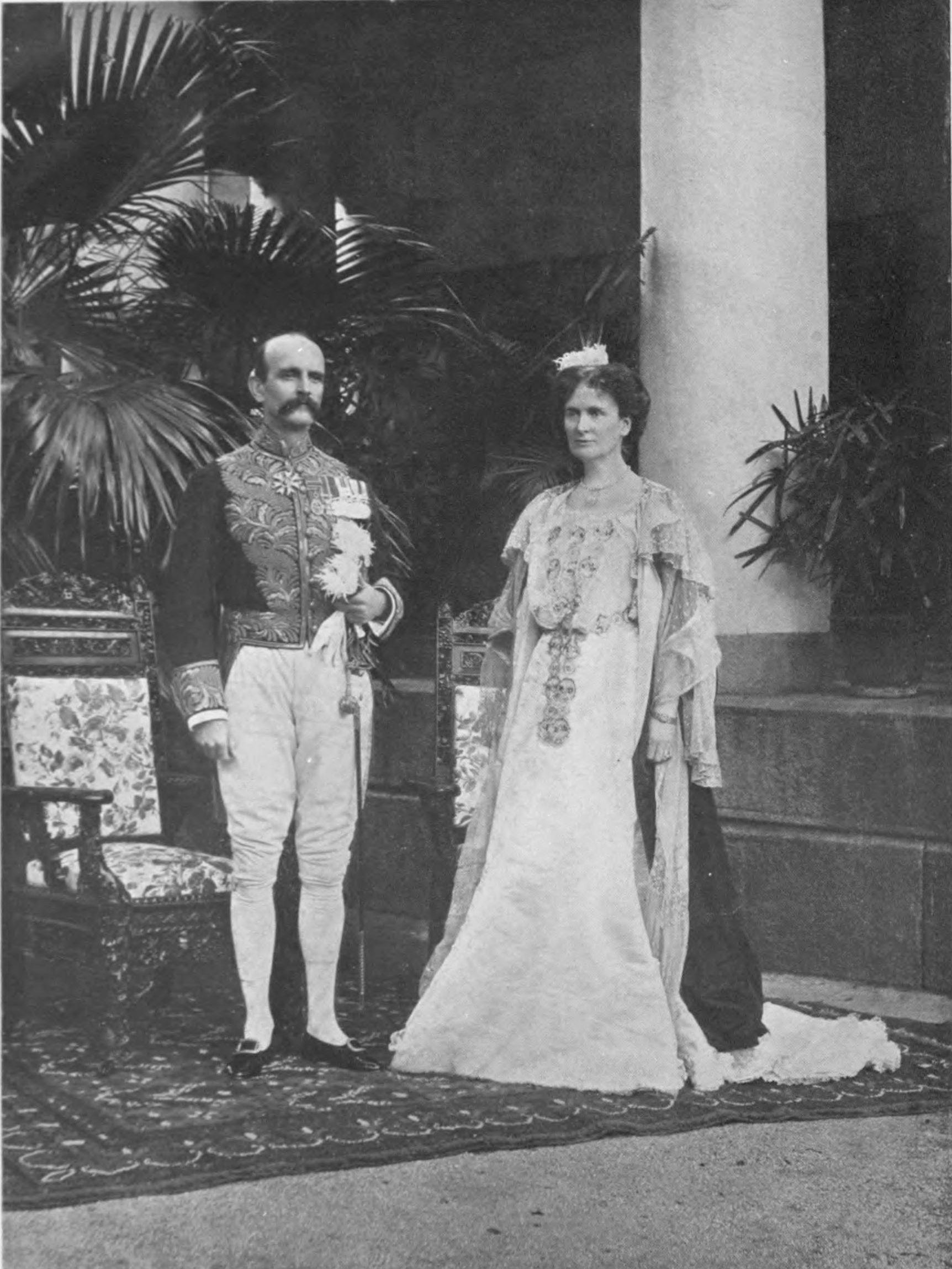
The Lord and Lady Lugard, 1908

By 1902, the British had begun plans to move north into the Sokoto Caliphate. British General Lord Frederick Lugard was tasked by the Colonial Office to implement the agenda. Lugard used rivalries between many of the emirs in the southern reach of the caliphate and the central Sokoto administration to prevent any defence as he worked towards the capital. As the British approached the city of Sokoto, Sultan Muhammadu Attahiru I organised a quick defence of the city and fought the advancing British-led forces. The British force quickly won, sending Attahiru I and thousands of followers on a Mahdist hijra. In the northeast, the decline of the Bornu Empire gave rise to the British-controlled Borno Emirate, which established Abubakar Garbai of Borno as ruler.

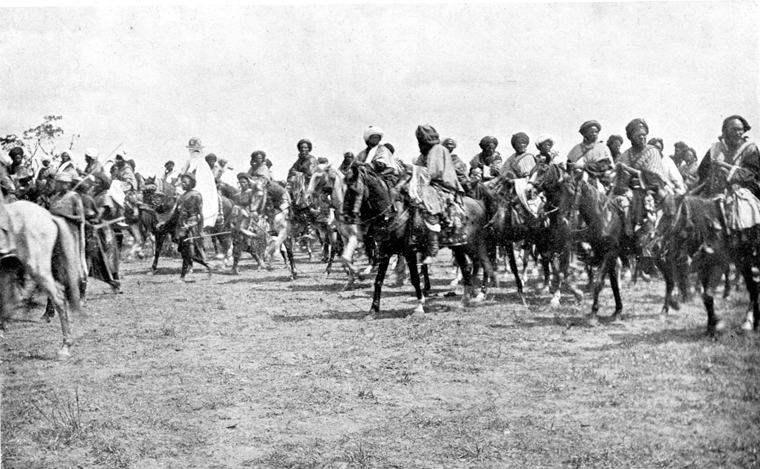
Emir of Kano with cavalry, 1911

In 1903, the British victory in the Battle of Kano gave them a logistical edge in pacifying the heartland of the Sokoto Caliphate and parts of the former Bornu Empire. On 13 March 1903, at the grand market square of Sokoto, the last vizier of the caliphate officially conceded to British rule. The British appointed Muhammadu Attahiru II as the new caliph. Lugard abolished the caliphate but retained the title sultan as a symbolic position in the newly organised Northern Nigeria Protectorate. This remnant became known as "Sokoto Sultanate Council". In June 1903, the British defeated the remaining northern forces of Attahiru. The caliphate forces in the south continued to resist the British and Germans in the Adamawa Wars. By 1907, resistance to European rule in the area had been quelled.

On 1 January 1914, the British formally united the Southern Nigeria Protectorate and the Northern Nigeria Protectorate into the Colony and Protectorate of Nigeria. Administratively, Nigeria remained divided into the Northern and Southern Protectorates and Lagos Colony. Inhabitants of the southern region sustained more interaction, economic and cultural, with the British and other Europeans owing to the coastal economy. Christian missions established Western educational institutions in the protectorates. Under Britain's policy of indirect rule and validation of Islamic legitimist tradition, the Crown did not encourage the operation of Christian missions in the northern, Islamic part of the country.

Nigerian nationalism first emerged in the 1920s, with its most significant figure being Herbert Macaulay. His vision aimed to bring all Nigerians together and demand independence. By the mid-20th century, following World War II, a wave for independence was sweeping across Africa. In response to the growth of Nigerian nationalism and demands for independence, successive constitutions legislated by the British government moved Nigeria toward self-government on a representative and increasingly federal basis. By the eve of independence in 1960, regional differences in modern educational access were marked. The legacy, though less pronounced, continues to the present day. The balance between north and south was also expressed in Nigeria's political life. For instance, northern Nigeria did not outlaw slavery until 1936 whilst in other parts of Nigeria, slavery was abolished soon after colonialism.

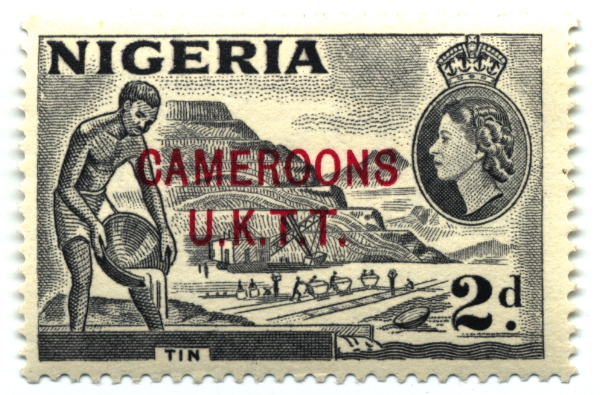
1953 postage stamp with portrait of Queen Elizabeth II

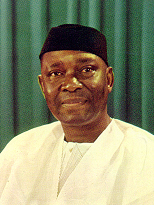
Nnamdi Azikiwe, first President of Nigeria (1963–1966)

Nigeria gained a degree of self-rule in 1954, and full independence from the United Kingdom on 1 October 1960, as the Federation of Nigeria with Abubakar Tafawa Balewa as its Prime Minister, while retaining the Monarch of Nigeria, Elizabeth II, as nominal head of state and Queen of Nigeria. Nnamdi Azikiwe replaced the colonial governor-general in November 1960. At independence, the cultural and political differences were sharp among Nigeria's dominant ethnic groups: the Hausa in the north, Igbo in the east, and Yoruba in the west. The Westminster system of government was retained, and thus the President's powers were generally ceremonial. The parliamentary system of government had Abubakar Tafawa Balewa as Prime Minister and Nnamdi Azikiwe as the ceremonial president. The founding government was a coalition of conservative parties: the Northern People's Congress led by Sir Ahmadu Bello, a party dominated by Muslim northerners, and the Igbo and Christian-dominated National Council of Nigeria and the Cameroons led by Nnamdi Azikiwe. The opposition consisted of the comparatively liberal Action Group, which was largely dominated by the Yoruba and led by Obafemi Awolowo. An imbalance was created in the polity as a result of the 1961 plebiscite. Southern Cameroons opted to join the Republic of Cameroon while Northern Cameroons chose to join Nigeria. The northern part of the country became larger than the southern part.

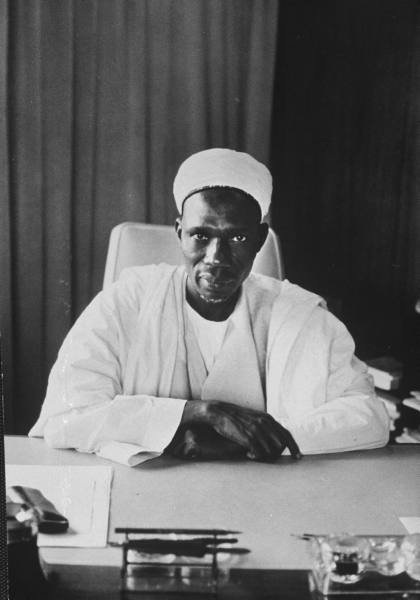
Abubakar Tafawa Balewa, Nigeria's first Prime Minister during the 1st Republic

=== Early republic and civil war ===
At Nigeria's independence in 1960, the British colonial authorities, distrustful of the Yoruba and Igbo peoples, handed disproportionate power to the Northern elites. In large this was due to the fact that the British had enjoyed far greater cooperation through indirect rule with the Hausa-Fulani aristocracy, who had been far more submissive and offered significantly less resistance than the leaders of the Yoruba and Igbo peoples collectively. The Northern Region gained more seats in parliament than the southerner Eastern and Western regions combined—this would cement Northern dominance in Nigerian politics for years to come. Resentment among southern politicians precipitated into political chaos in the country. Obafemi Awolowo, Premier of Western Region, was accused of attempting to overthrow the government. This followed a period of conflict between the AG regional government and the central government. In spite of the flimsiness of the evidence presented by the government's prosecutors, he was convicted. With incarceration of Awolowo, Samuel Akintola took over as the premier of Western Region. Because Akintola was an ally of Ahmadu Bello, the undisputed strong man of Nigeria, Akintola was criticised as being a tool of the North. As premier of the West, Akintola presided over the most chaotic era in Western Region—one which earned it the nickname "the Wild-Wild West". However, as late as Thursday, 13 January 1966, Balewa had announced that the federal government was not going to intervene in the West. However, the very next day, Akintola, premier of the West met with his ally Ahmadu Bello, the Sardauna of Sokoto, premier of the North and party boss of NPC party to which Balewa belonged. At the same time a top-level security conference in Lagos was taking place which was attended by most of the country's senior army officers. All of this activity created rumours that the Balewa government would be forced to crack down on lawlessness in the West using military might.

The disequilibrium and perceived corruption of the electoral and political process led to two military coups in 1966. The first coup was in January 1966 and was led mostly by soldiers under Majors Emmanuel Ifeajuna (of the Igbo tribe), Chukwuma Kaduna Nzeogwu (Northerner of Eastern extraction) and Adewale Ademoyega (a Yoruba from the West). The coup plotters succeeded in assassinating Sir Ahmadu Bello and Sir Abubakar Tafawa Balewa alongside prominent leaders of the Northern Region and Premier Samuel Akintola of the Western Region, but the plotters struggled to form a central government. Senate President Nwafor Orizu handed over government control to the Army, under the command of another Igbo officer, Major General Johnson Aguiyi-Ironsi. Later, the counter-coup of 1966, supported primarily by Northern military officers, facilitated the rise of Yakubu Gowon as military head of state. Tension rose between north and south; Igbos in northern cities suffered persecution and many fled to the Eastern Region.

The Republic of Biafra in June 1967, when it declared its independence from the rest of Nigeria

In May 1967, Governor of the Eastern Region Lt. Colonel Emeka Ojukwu declared the region independent from the federation as a state called the Republic of Biafra as a result of the continuous and systematically planned attacks against Igbos and those of Eastern extraction, popularly known as the 1966 pogroms. This declaration precipitated the Nigerian Civil War which began as the official Nigerian government side attacked Biafra on 6 July 1967, at Garkem. The 30-month war, with a long blockade of Biafra and its isolation from trade and international relief, ended in January 1970. Estimates of the number of dead in the former Eastern Region during the 30-month civil war range from one to three million. The UK and Soviet Union were the main military backers of the Nigerian government, with Nigeria utilising air support from Egyptian pilots provided by Gamal Abdel Nasser, while France and Israel aided the Biafrans. The Congolese government under President Joseph-Désiré Mobutu took an early stand on the Biafran secession, voicing strong support for the Nigerian federal government and deploying thousands of troops to fight against the secessionists.

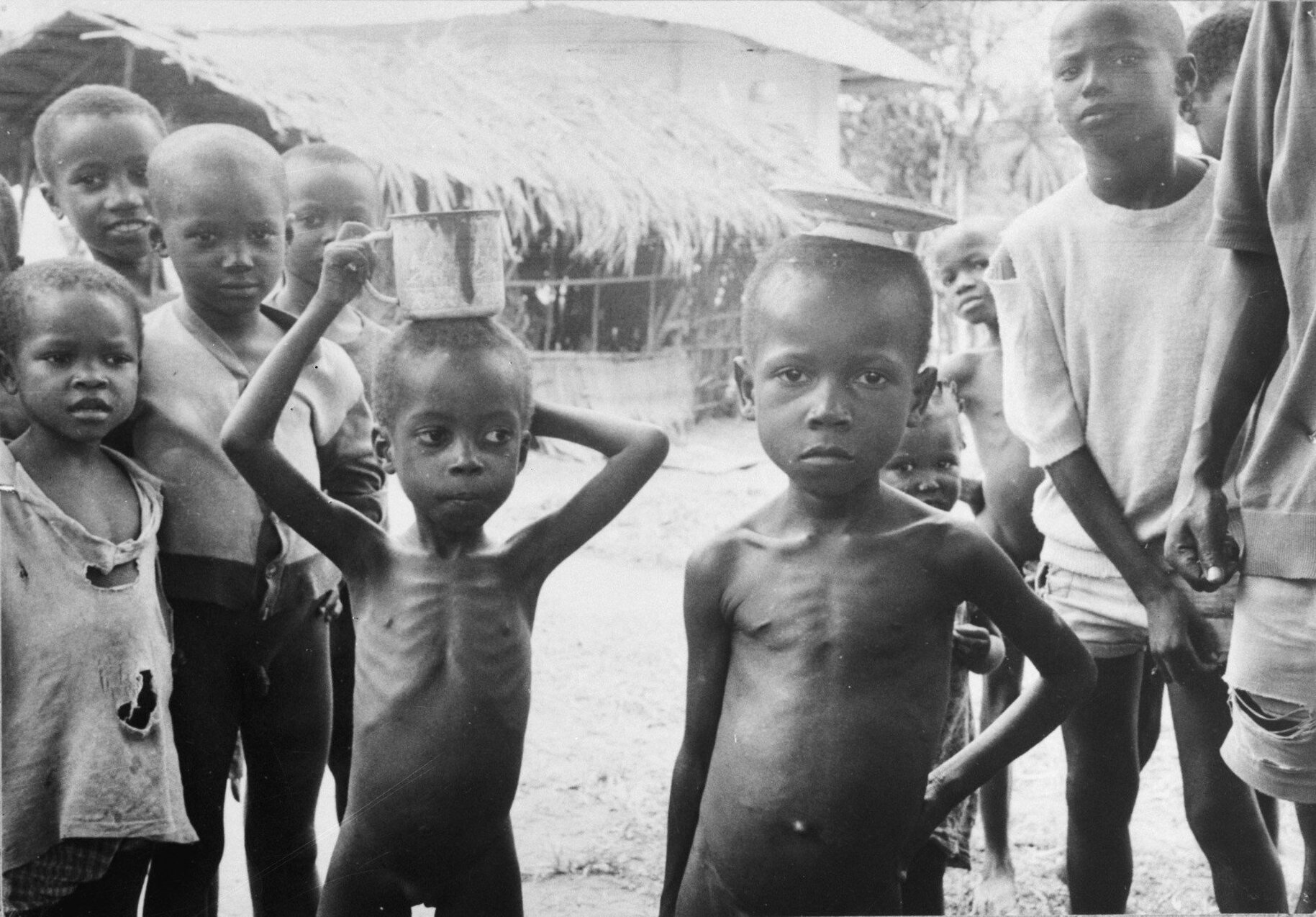
The blockade of Biafra during the Nigerian Civil War (1967–1970) resulted in a famine that ultimately cost at least a million lives.

Following the war, Nigeria experienced an oil boom in the 1970s, during which the country joined OPEC and generated substantial oil revenues. Despite these revenues, the military government did little to improve the standard of living, help small and medium businesses, or invest in infrastructure. As oil revenues fuelled the rise of federal subsidies to states, the federal government became the centre of political struggle and the threshold of power in the country. As oil production and revenue rose, the Nigerian government became increasingly dependent on oil revenues and international commodity markets for budgetary and economic concerns. The coup in July 1975, led by Generals Shehu Musa Yar'Adua and Joseph Garba, ousted Gowon, who fled to Britain. The coup plotters wanted to replace Gowon's autocratic rule with a triumvirate of three brigadier generals whose decisions could be vetoed by a Supreme Military Council. For this triumvirate, they convinced General Murtala Muhammed to become military head of state, with General Olusegun Obasanjo as his second-in-command, and General Theophilus Danjuma as the third. Together, the triumvirate introduced austerity measures to stem inflation, established a Corrupt Practices Investigation Bureau, replaced all military governors with new officers, and launched "Operation Deadwood" through which they fired 11,000 officials from the civil service.

Colonel Buka Suka Dimka launched a February 1976 coup attempt, during which General Murtala Muhammed was assassinated. Dimka lacked widespread support among the military, and his coup failed, forcing him to flee. After the coup attempt, General Olusegun Obasanjo was appointed military head of state. Obasanjo vowed to continue Murtala's policies. Aware of the danger of alienating northern Nigerians, Obasanjo brought General Shehu Yar'Adua as his replacement and second-in-command as Chief of Staff, Supreme Headquarters completing the military triumvirate, with Obasanjo as head of state and General Theophilus Danjuma as Chief of Army Staff, the three went on to re-establish control over the military regime and organised the military's transfer of power programme: states creation and national delimitation, local government reforms and the constitutional drafting committee for a new republic.

=== Military dictatorship and coups ===
The military carefully planned the return to civilian rule putting in place measures to ensure that political parties had broader support than witnessed during the first republic. In 1979, five political parties competed in a series of elections in which Alhaji Shehu Shagari of the National Party of Nigeria (NPN) was elected president. All five parties won representation in the National Assembly. On 1 October 1979, Shehu Shagari was sworn in as the first President and Commander-in-Chief of the Federal Republic of Nigeria. Obasanjo peacefully transferred power to Shagari, becoming the first head of state in Nigerian history to willingly step down.

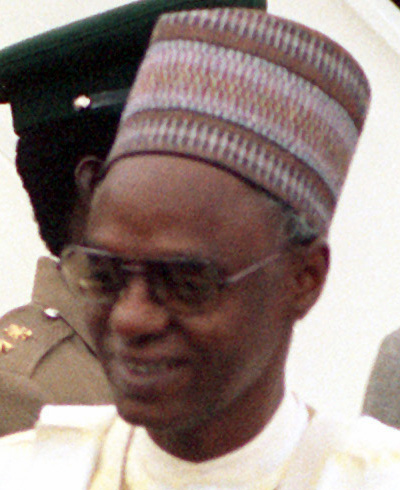
Shehu Shagari was the first elected President of Nigeria from 1979 to 1983.

In August 1983, Shagari and the NPN were returned to power in a landslide victory, with a majority of seats in the National Assembly and control of 12 state governments. However, the elections were marred by violence, and allegations of widespread vote-rigging and electoral malfeasance led to legal battles over the results. There were also uncertainties, such as in the first republic, that political leaders may be unable to govern properly. The 1983 military coup d'état was coordinated by key officers of the Nigerian military and led to the overthrow of the government and the installation of Major General Muhammadu Buhari as head of state. The military coup of Muhammadu Buhari shortly after the regime's re-election in 1984 was generally viewed as a positive development. Ibrahim Babangida overthrew Buhari in the coup d'état of 1985. Babangida established the Nigerian Political Bureau in 1986 which made recommendations for the transition to the Third Nigerian Republic. In 1989, Babangida started making plans for the transition to the Third Nigerian Republic. Babangida survived the 1990 Nigerian coup d'état attempt, then postponed a promised return to democracy to 1992.

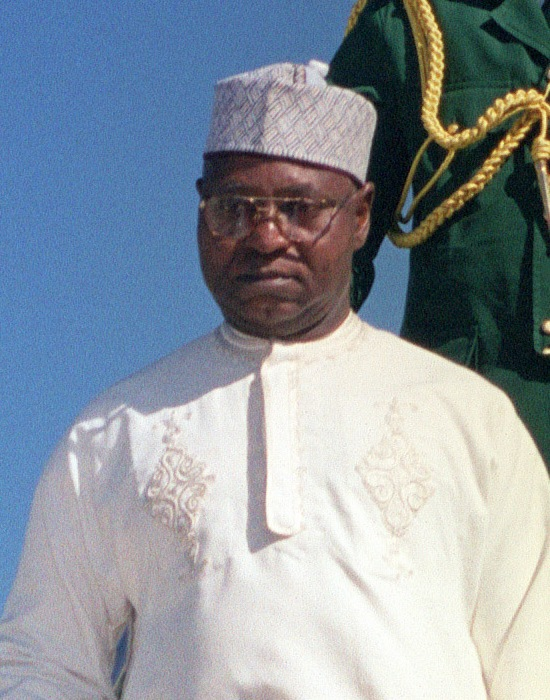
Abdulsalami Abubakar, military ruler in 1998, saw the return to democracy in 1999.

Babangida legalised the formation of political parties and formed the two-party system with the Social Democratic Party and National Republican Convention ahead of the 1992 general elections. He urged all Nigerians to join either of the parties, which Chief Bola Ige referred to as "two leper hands". The 1993 presidential election held on 12 June was the first since the military coup of 1983. The results, though not officially declared by the National Electoral Commission, showed the duo of Moshood Abiola and Baba Gana Kingibe of the Social Democratic Party defeated Bashir Tofa and Sylvester Ugoh of the National Republican Convention by over 2.3 million votes. However, Babangida annulled the elections, leading to massive civilian protests that effectively shut down the country for weeks. In August 1993, Babangida finally kept his promise to relinquish power to a civilian government but not before appointing Ernest Shonekan head of an interim national government. Babangida's regime has been considered the most corrupt and responsible for creating a culture of corruption in Nigeria.

Shonekan's interim government, the shortest in the political history of the country, was overthrown in a coup d'état of 1993 led by General Sani Abacha, who used military force on a wide scale to end the crisis of the Third Republic. In 1995, Abacha's regime hanged environmentalist Ken Saro-Wiwa on trumped-up charges in the deaths of four Ogoni elders, which caused Nigerian's suspension from the Commonwealth. Lawsuits under the American Alien Tort Statute against Royal Dutch Shell and Brian Anderson, the head of Shell's Nigerian operation, settled out of court. Several hundred million dollars in accounts traced to Abacha were discovered in 1999. The regime came to an end in 1998 when the dictator died in the villa. Abacha looted money to offshore accounts in Western European banks and maintained his grip on power through arrests and bribing generals and politicians. His successor, General Abdulsalami Abubakar, adopted a new constitution on 5 May 1999, which provided for multiparty elections.

=== 1999–present ===
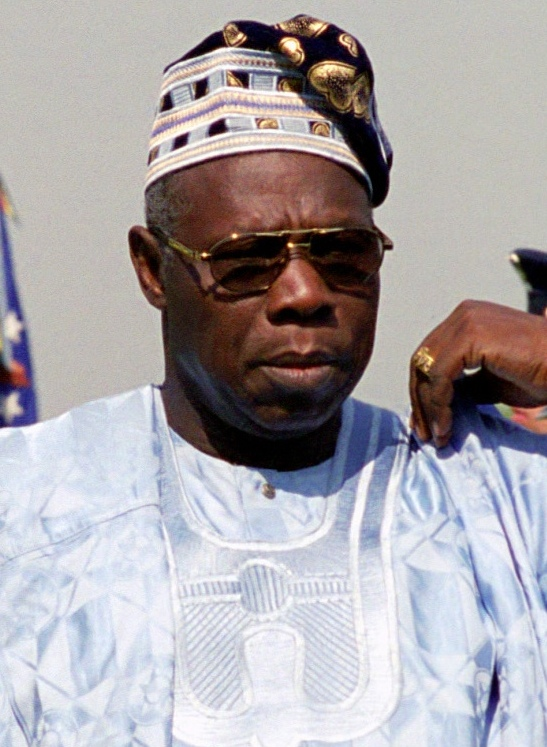
Olusegun Obasanjo served as president of Nigeria from 1999 to 2007.

On 29 May 1999, Abubakar handed over power to the winner of the 1999 presidential election, former military ruler General Olusegun Obasanjo, as President of Nigeria. Obasanjo had been in prison under the dictatorship of Abacha. Obasanjo's inauguration heralded the beginning of the Fourth Nigerian Republic, ending a 39-year period of short-lived democracies, civil war and military dictatorship. Although the elections that brought Obasanjo to power and allowed him to run for a second term in the 2003 presidential elections were condemned as unfree and unfair, Nigeria made significant progress in democratisation under Obasanjo.

In the 2007 general elections, Umaru Yar'Adua of the People's Democratic Party came to power. The international community, which had observed the Nigerian elections to promote a free and fair process, condemned these elections as seriously flawed. Yar'Adua died on 5 May 2010, and Vice President Goodluck Jonathan had been sworn in by the Senate three months earlier as acting president to succeed Yar'Adua. Jonathan won the 2011 presidential election; the polls went smoothly and with relatively little violence or electoral fraud. Jonathan's tenure saw an economic recovery that made Nigeria the leading economic power in Africa. The Jonathan administration also saw an unparalleled increase in corruption, with as many as 20 billion US dollars said to have been lost to the Nigerian state through the national oil company. Above all, however, Jonathan's tenure saw the emergence of a wave of terror by the Boko Haram insurgency, including the Gwoza massacre and Chibok schoolgirls kidnapping in 2014.

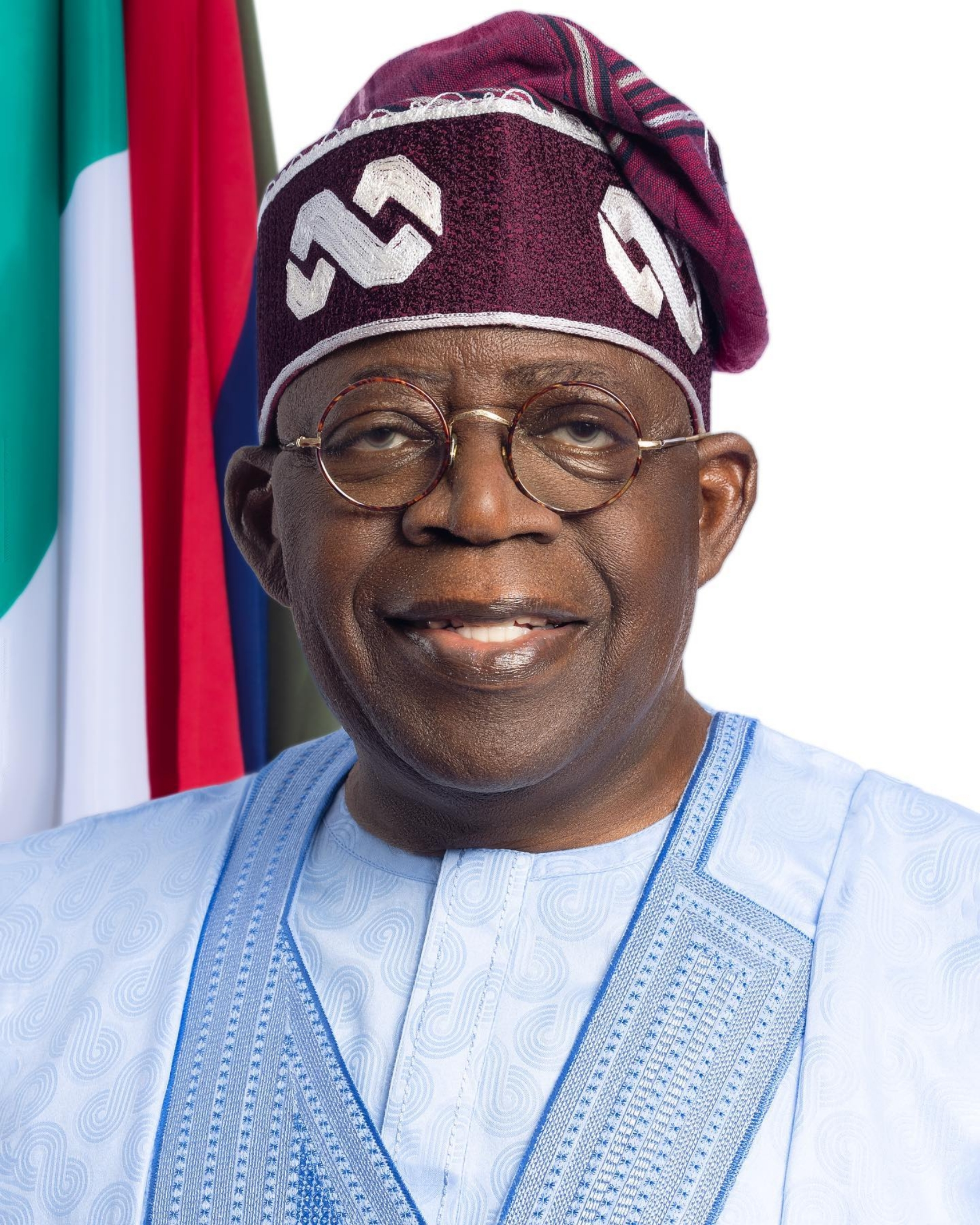
Chief Bola Tinubu is serving as President of Nigeria since 29 May 2023.

Ahead of the general election of 2015, a merger of the biggest opposition parties in Nigeria – the Action Congress of Nigeria, the Congress for Progressive Change, the All Nigeria Peoples Party, a faction of the All Progressives Grand Alliance and the new PDP (a faction of serving governors of the ruling People's Democratic Party) – formed the All Progressives Congress led by current president Bola Ahmed Tinubu. At the time, it was the most expensive election ever to be held on the African continent (being surpassed only by the elections of 2019 and 2023). The new mega-opposition party chose as their candidate for the election former military dictator Muhammadu Buhari. Buhari's campaign in 2015 was popular and built around his image as a staunch anti-corruption fighter—he won the election by over two million votes. Observers generally praised the election as being fair. The election marked the first time an incumbent president had lost re-election in Nigeria. Insecurity heightened drastically under Buhari with banditry, insurgency and separatist agitations increasingly widespread. The economy also experienced two recessions and global oil shocks as a result of the COVID-19 pandemic. Buhari was reelected in the 2019 presidential election; he died two years after leaving office.

Four major candidates, amongst other less popular candidates, vied for the presidency in the 2023 presidential election. For the first time since the return of democracy, no former military ruler ran for president, marking a strengthening of democracy and faith in the multiparty constitution. The election also saw the rise of metonymic supporters of the new candidates, the Obidient movement of Peter Obi, previously governor of Anambra State, widely appealed to young, urban voters and has his core base in the Southeast; and the Kwankwassiya of Rabiu Kwankwaso, former governor of Kano State in the Northwest.

Bola Tinubu of the ruling party won the disputed election with 36.61% of the vote, though both runners-up claimed victory and litigation continued in an election tribunal. Tinubu was inaugurated on 29 May 2023. His government faced ongoing domestic challenges, including widespread kidnapping in Nigeria. On 29 May 2024, Tinubu signed a law reinstating Nigeria, We Hail Thee, the national anthem from 1960 to 1978, replacing Arise, O Compatriots. The United States carried out a strike against Islamic State militants in northwest Nigeria on 25 December 2025 at the request of Tinubu's government, marking the first foreign military intervention in post-independence Nigeria. U.S. President Donald Trump stated the strike was meant to counter alleged violence against Christians in the north. In May 2026, a joint military campaign executed by American and Nigerian forces in northeastern Nigeria resulted in the elimination of Abu-Bilal al-Minuki, the global second-in-command of the Islamic State. In July, the United States withdrew most of its active personnel from the country and shifted its operational focus to providing intelligence support.

== Geography ==
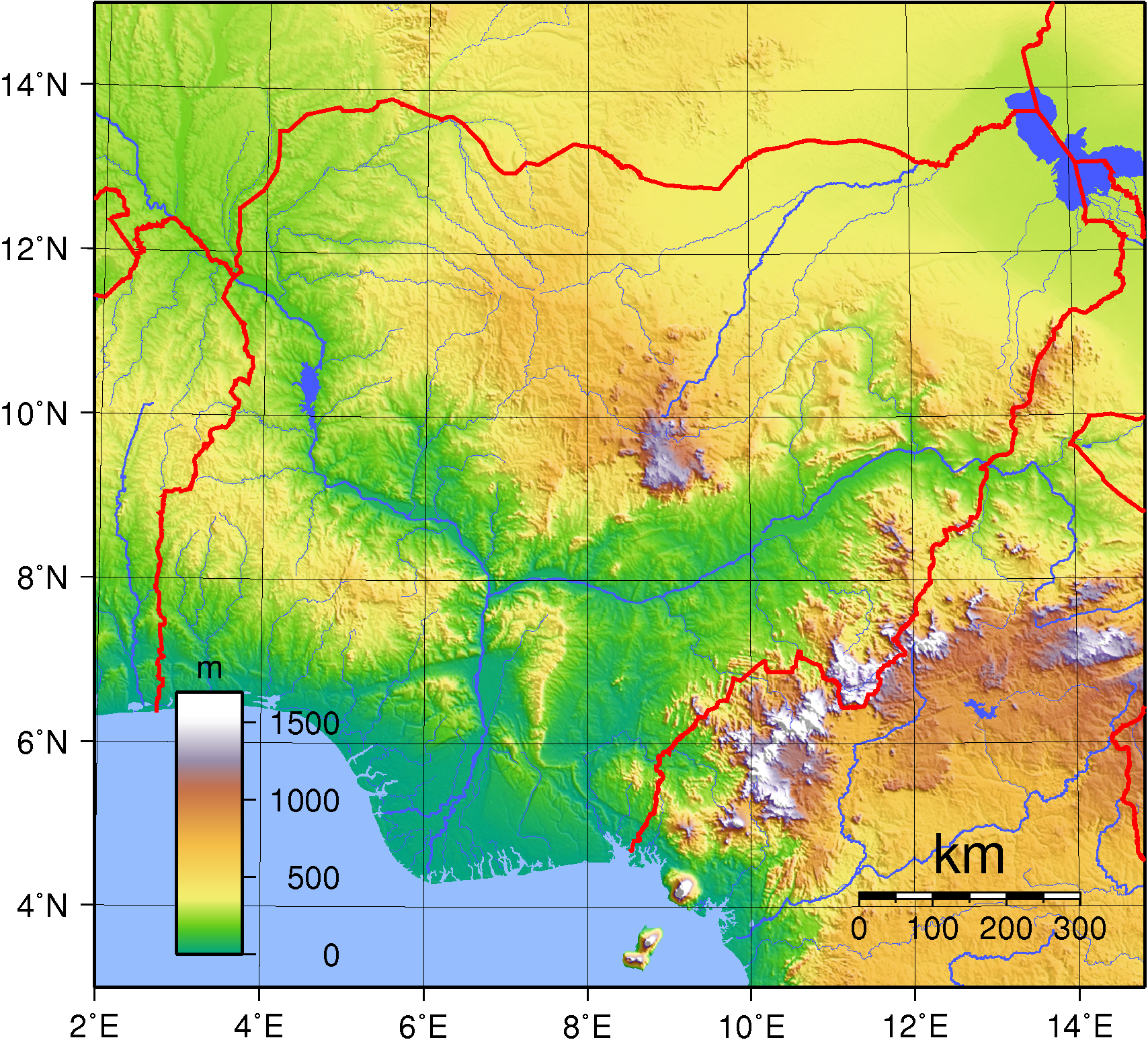
Topography of Nigeria

Nigeria is located in western Africa on the Gulf of Guinea and has a total area of 923,768 km^{2} (356,669 mi^{2}), making it the world's 31st-largest country. Its borders span 4,047 kilometres (2,515 mi), and it shares borders with Benin (773 km or 480 mi), Niger (1,497 km or 930 mi), Chad (87 km or 54 mi), and Cameroon (including the separatist Ambazonia) 1,690 km or 1,050 mi. Its coastline is at least 853 km (530 mi). Nigeria lies between latitudes 4° and 14°N, and longitudes 2° and 15°E. The highest point in Nigeria is Chappal Waddi at 2,419 m (7,936 ft). The main rivers are the Niger and the Benue, which converge and empty into the Niger Delta. This is one of the world's largest river deltas and the location of a large area of Central African mangroves.

Nigeria's most expansive topographical region is that of the valleys of the Niger and Benue river valleys (which merge and form a Y-shape). To the southwest of the Niger is a "rugged" highland. To the southeast of the Benue are hills and mountains, which form the Mambilla Plateau, the highest plateau in Nigeria. This plateau extends through the border with Cameroon, where the montane land is part of the Bamenda Highlands of Cameroon.

Climate map of Nigeria

The far south is defined by its tropical rainforest climate, where annual rainfall is 1,500 to 2,000 millimetres (60 to 80 in) per year. In the southeast stands the Obudu Plateau. Coastal plains are found in both the southwest and the southeast. Mangrove swamps are found along the coast.

The area near the border with Cameroon close to the coast is rich rainforest and part of the Cross-Sanaga-Bioko coastal forests ecoregion, an important centre for biodiversity. It is a habitat for the drill primate, which is found in the wild only in this area and across the border in Cameroon. The areas surrounding Calabar, Cross River State, also in this forest, are believed to contain the world's largest diversity of butterflies. The area of southern Nigeria between the Niger and the Cross Rivers has lost most of its forest because of development and harvesting by increased population and has been replaced by grassland.

Everything in between the far south and the far north is savannah (insignificant tree cover, with grasses and flowers located between trees). Rainfall is more limited to between 500 and 1,500 millimetres (20 and 60 in) per year. The savannah zone's three categories are Guinean forest-savanna mosaic, Sudan savannah, and Sahel savannah.

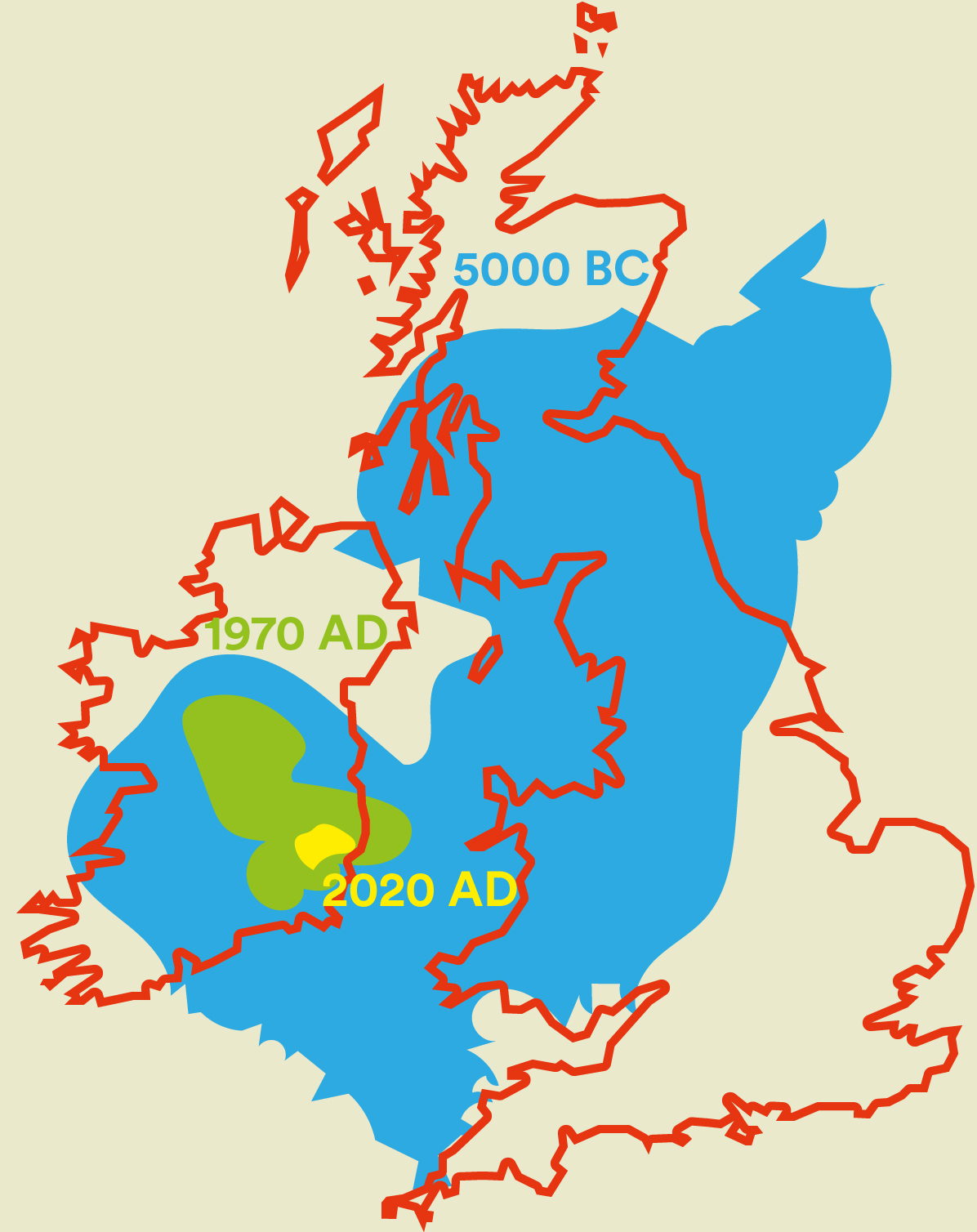
Shrinking of Lake Chad in north-eastern Nigeria, with the outline of the British Isles for size comparison

=== Hydrology ===
Nigeria is divided into two main catchment areas – that of Lake Chad and that of the Niger. The Niger catchment area covers about 63% of the country. The main tributary of the Niger is the Benue, whose tributaries extend beyond Cameroon into Cameroon into Chad and the Sharie catchment area. In the Sahel region, rain is less than 500 millimetres (20 in) per year, and the Sahara Desert is encroaching. In the dry northeast corner of the country lies Lake Chad, on a shared water boundary delimitation with Niger, Chad and Cameroon.

The Chad Basin is fed from the north-eastern quarter of Nigeria. The Bauchi Plateau forms the watershed between the Niger/Benue and Komadugu Yobe river systems. The flat plains of north-eastern Nigeria are geographically part of the Chad Basin, where the course of the El Beid River forms the border with Cameroon, from the Mandara Mountains to Lake Chad. The Komadugu Yobe river system gives rise to the internationally important Hadejia-Nguru wetlands and Ox-bow lakes around Lake Nguru in the rainy season. Other rivers of the northeast include the Ngadda and the Yedseram, both of which flow through the Sambisa swamps, thus forming a river system. The river system of the northeast is also a major river system. In addition, Nigeria has numerous coastal rivers.

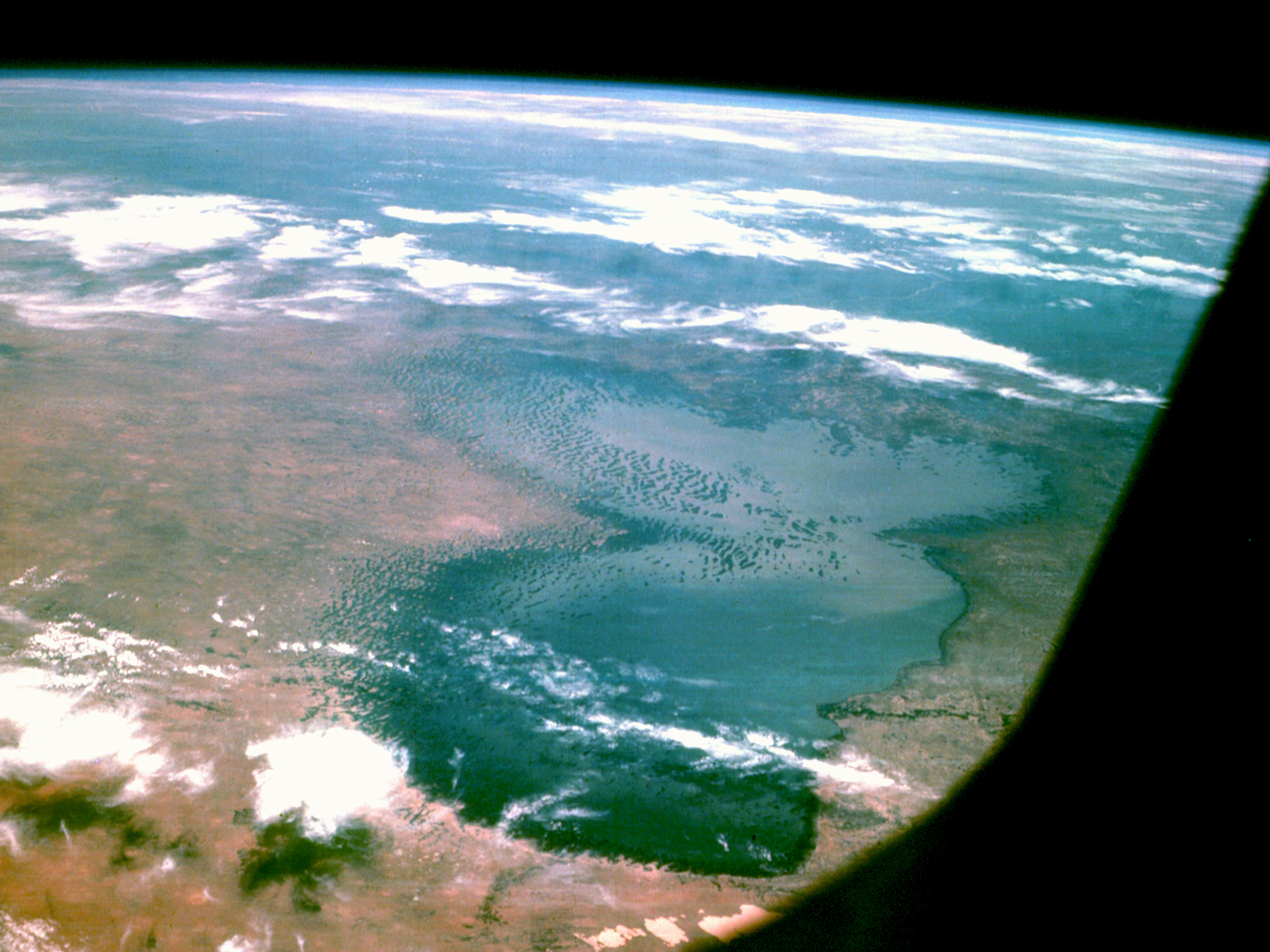
Photo of Lake Chad from Apollo 7, 1968

Over the last million years, Lake Chad in the far north-east of Nigeria has dried up several times for a few thousand years and just as often growing to many times its current size. In recent decades its surface area has been reduced considerably, which may also be due to humans taking water from the inlets to irrigate agricultural land.

=== Vegetation ===
Nigeria is covered by three types of vegetation: forests (where there is significant tree cover), savannahs (insignificant tree cover, with grasses and flowers located between trees), and montane land (least common and mainly found in the mountains near the Cameroon border). Both the forest zone and the savannah zone are divided into three parts.

Some of the forest zone's most southerly portion, especially around the Niger River and Cross River deltas, is mangrove swamp. North of this is a freshwater swamp, containing different vegetation from the saltwater mangrove swamps, and north of that is a rainforest.

The savannah zone's three categories are divided into Guinean forest-savanna mosaic, made up of plains of tall grass which are interrupted by trees, the most common across the country; Sudan savannah, with short grasses and short trees; and Sahel savannah patches of grass and sand, found in the northeast.

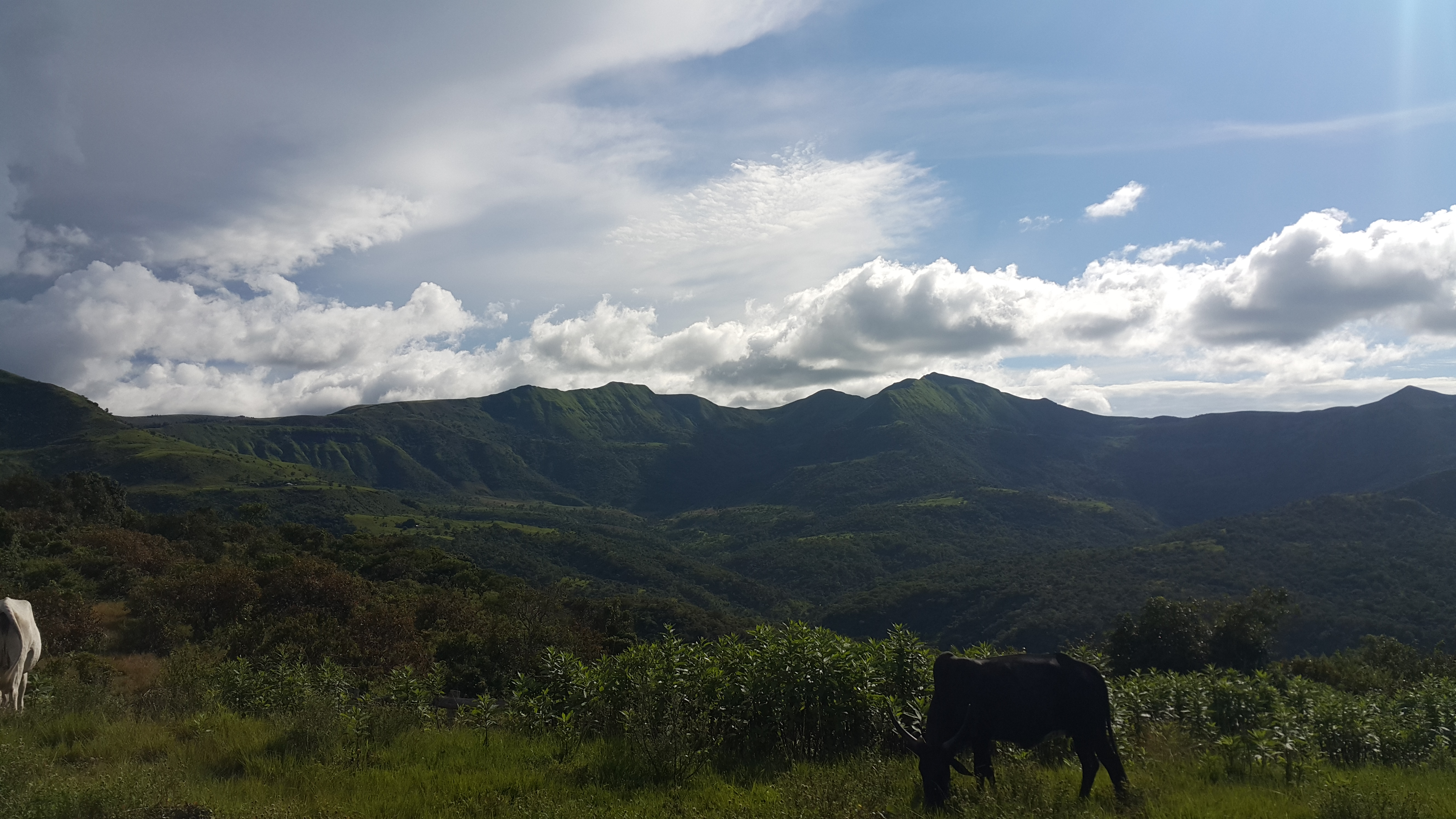
The Mambilla Plateau in the North-Eastern region of Nigeria

=== Environmental issues ===
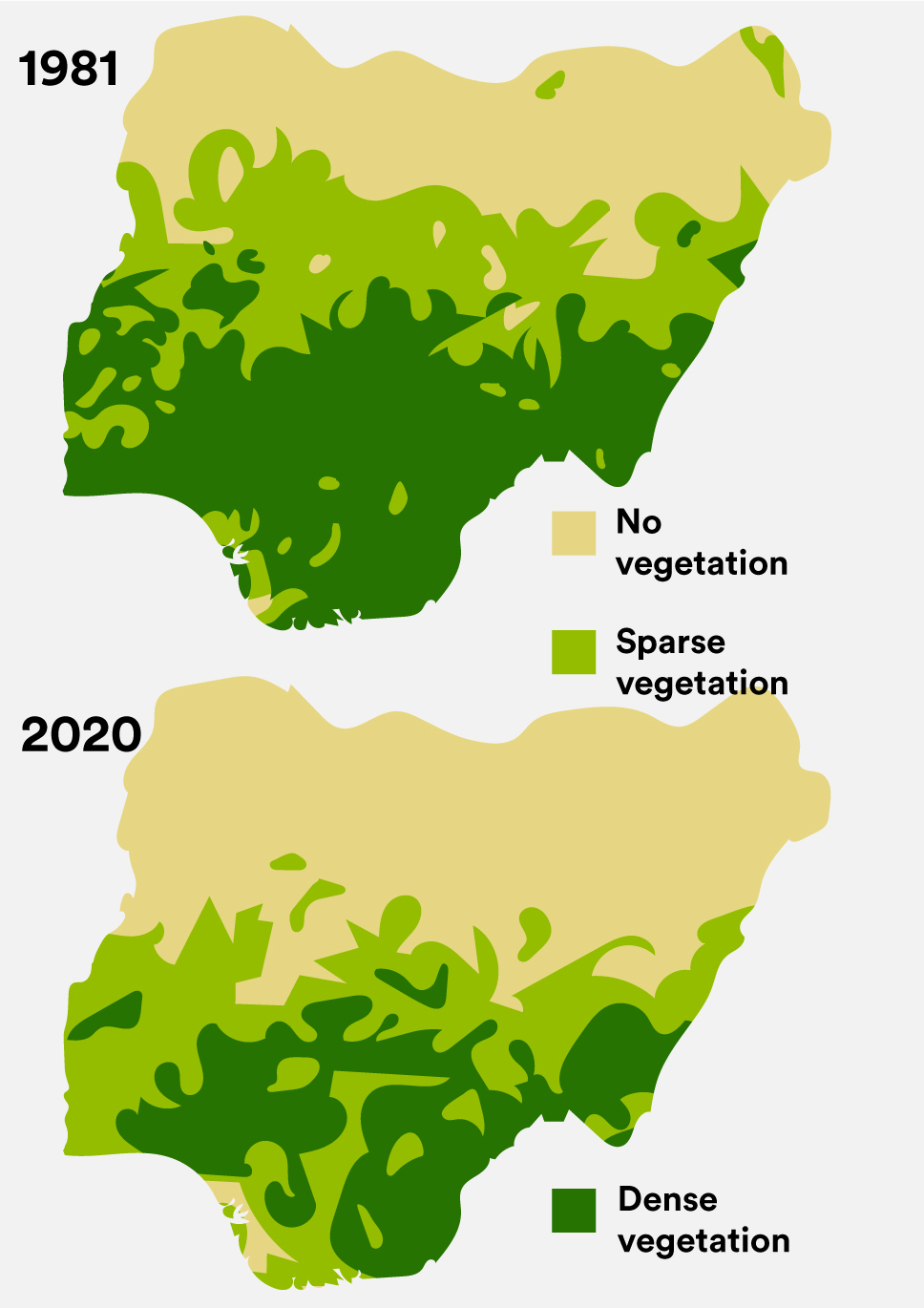
Deforestation in Nigeria 1981–2020

Waste management including sewage treatment, the linked processes of deforestation and soil degradation, and climate change are the major environmental problems in Nigeria.

Climate change

Satellite image of Lake Chad, showing it shrinking between 1984 and 2018

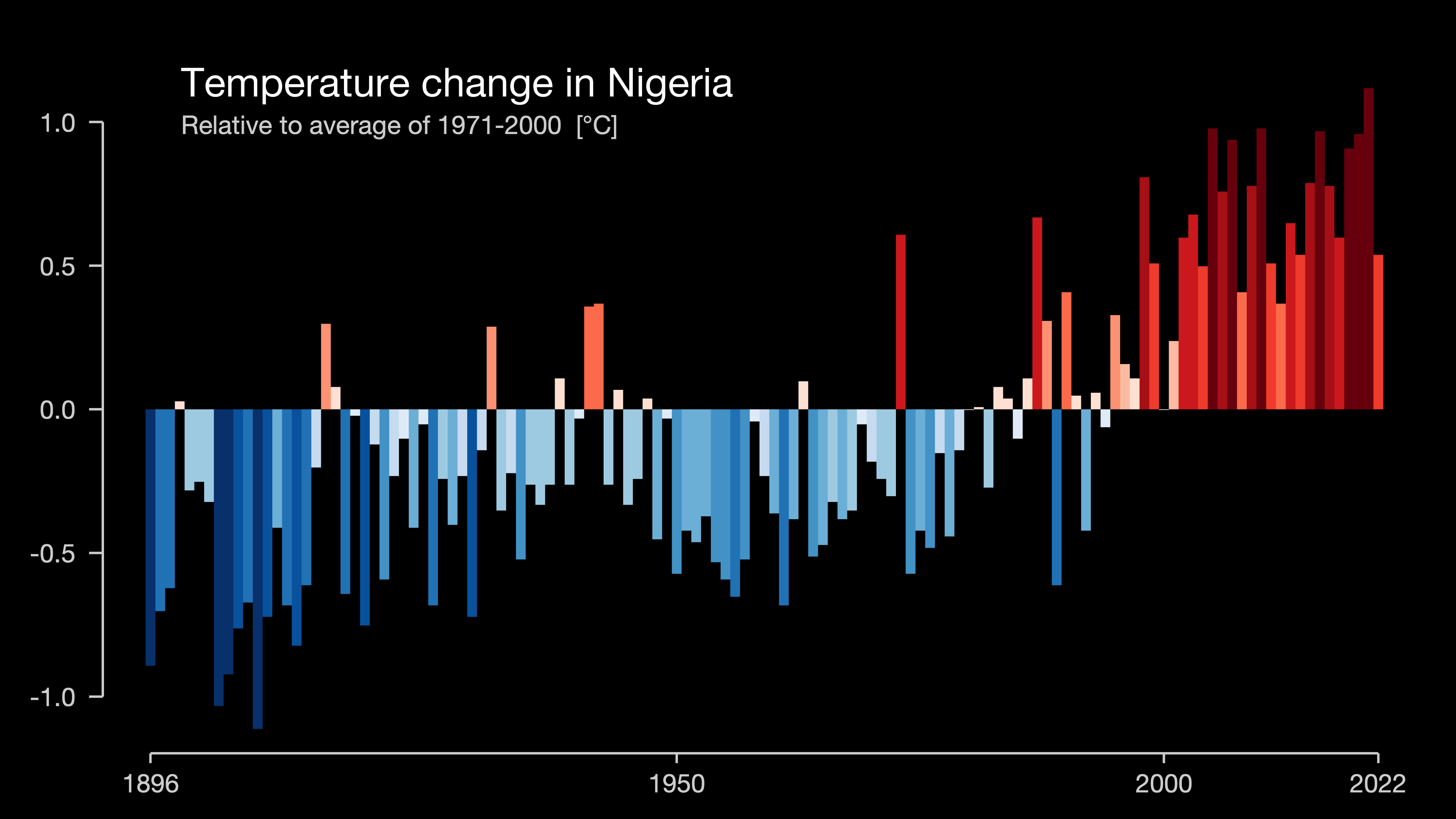
Temperature change in Nigeria; each bar represents the average temperature over that year.

Climate change in Nigeria has caused increasing temperatures and rainfall variability (increasing in coastal areas and declining in continental areas) resulting in drought, desertification, rising sea levels, erosion, floods, thunderstorms, bush fires, landslides, land degradation and more frequent, extreme weather conditions. Climate change is leading to biodiversity loss, reduced food and water security, increasing poverty, conflict, displacement, economic instability and negative health outcomes in Nigeria. Nigeria is highly vulnerable to and not well prepared to deal with the effects of climate change. The agricultural sector is particularly most vulnerable.

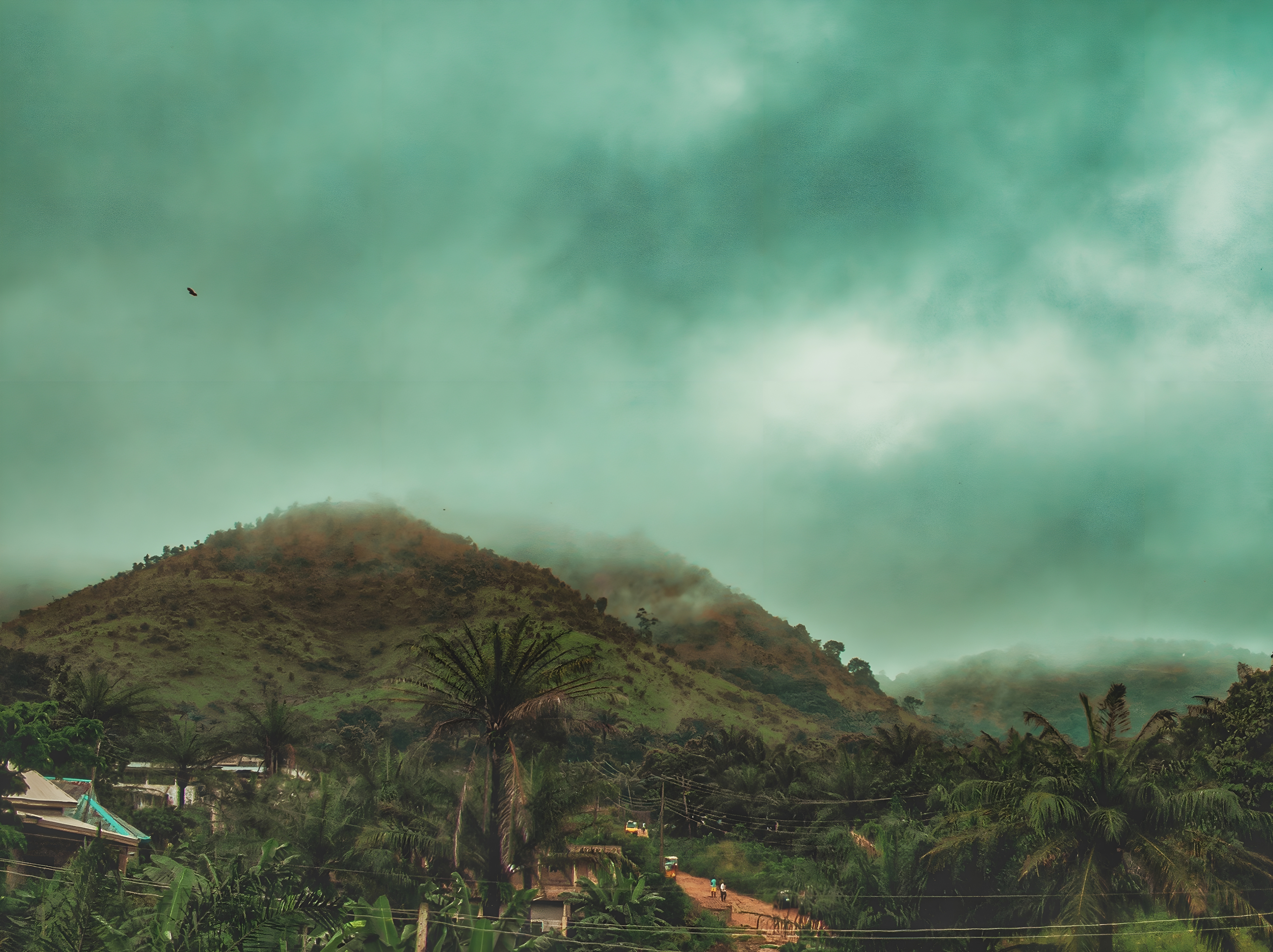
A thick layer of Harmattan fog in Enugu State

Nigeria is in the top 25 highest greenhouse gas emitters, contributing 0.8% of the global total emissions. Nigeria has committed to cut greenhouse gas emissions by 20% on its own, and by 47% if it receives international support, by 2030. The country has also committed to net zero by 2060. Nigeria's climate change mitigation and adaptation plans focus on agriculture and food security (through e.g.: climate-smart agriculture), forests and biodiversity, water resources, energy and infrastructure (e.g.: transitioning to renewable energies like solar), health, human settlement, industry and commerce, transportation and communication. While there is some discussion about necessary capacity building at the individual, group and community level to engage in climate change responses, there is less attention given to higher levels of capacity building at the state and national level.

Deforestation

In 2005, Nigeria had the highest rate of deforestation in the world, according to the Food and Agriculture Organization of the United Nations. That year, 12.2%, the equivalent of 11,089,000 hectares, had been forested in the country. Between 1990 and 2000, Nigeria lost an average of 409,700 hectares of forest every year equal to an average annual deforestation rate of 2.4%. Between 1990 and 2005, in total Nigeria lost 35.7% of its forest cover or around 6,145,000 hectares. Nigeria had a 2019 Forest Landscape Integrity Index mean score of 6.2/10, ranking it 82nd globally out of 172 countries.

Pollution

Waste management poses problems in a megacity like Lagos and other major Nigerian cities, which are linked to economic development, population growth, and the inability of municipal councils to manage the resulting rise in industrial and domestic waste. This waste management problem is also attributable to unsustainable environmental management lifestyles of Kubwa community in the Federal Capital Territory, where there are habits of indiscriminate disposal of waste, dumping of waste along or into the canals, sewerage systems that are channels for water flows, and the like. Haphazard industrial planning, increased urbanisation, poverty, and the lack of competence of the municipal government are seen as the major reasons for high levels of waste pollution in the country's major cities. Some of the solutions have been disastrous to the environment, resulting in untreated waste being dumped in places where it can pollute waterways and groundwater.

Nigeria's Delta region is one of the most polluted regions in the world due to serious oil spills and other environmental problems caused by its oil industry. The heavy contamination of the air, ground and water with toxic pollutants is often used as an example of ecocide. In additional to the environmental damage it has caused conflict in the Delta region.

Illegal oil refineries, in which local operators convert stolen crude oil into petrol and diesel, are considered particularly "dirty, dangerous and lucrative". Safety and environmental aspects are usually ignored. Refining petroleum also inevitably produces heavy oil, which is "cracked" into lighter fuel components in regular plants at great technical expense. Illegal refineries do not have these technical capabilities and "dispose" of the heavy oil where it then accumulates. The lighter components of crude oil (methane to butane, isobutane) create a certain risk of explosion, which often leads to disasters at illegal plants. In 2022, Nigeria suffered 125 deaths from explosions at local, illegal refineries.

In 2010, thousands of people were inadvertently exposed to lead-containing soil from informal gold mining within the northern state of Zamfara. While estimates vary, it is thought that upwards of 400 children died of acute lead poisoning.

== Politics ==
=== Government ===
Coat of arms of Nigeria in current use

Nigeria is a federal republic modelled after the United States, with 36 states and the capital Abuja as an independent unit. The executive power is exercised by the President. The president is both head of state and head of the federal government. The president is elected by popular vote to a maximum of two four-year terms. State governors, like the president, are elected for four years and may serve a maximum of two terms. The president's power is limited by a Senate and a House of Representatives, which are combined in a bicameral body called the National Assembly. The Senate is a 109-seat body with three members from each state and one from the capital region of Abuja; members are elected by popular vote to four-year terms. The House contains 360 seats, with the number of seats per state determined by population.

The Nigerian president is elected in a modified two-round system. To be elected in the first round, a candidate must receive a majority of the votes and more than 25% of the votes in at least 24 of the 36 states. If no candidate reaches this hurdle, a second round of voting takes place between the leading candidate and the next candidate who received the majority of votes in the highest number of states. By convention, presidential candidates take a running mate (candidate for the vice presidency) who is both ethnically and religiously the opposite of themselves. There is no law prescribing this, yet all presidential candidates since the existence of the Fourth Republic until 2023 adhered to this rule.

However, this principle of religious and ethnic diversity in leadership was ignored in the 2023 General Elections, where the candidate for the All Progressives Congress, Bola Ahmed Tinubu, a Muslim, selected another Muslim, Senator Kashim Shettima, as running mate.

=== Administrative divisions ===
Map of Nigeria with administrative divisions

Nigeria is divided into thirty-six states and one Federal Capital Territory, which are further sub-divided into 774 local government areas. In some contexts, the states are aggregated into six geopolitical zones: North West, North East, North Central, South West, South East, and South South.

Nigeria has five cities with a population of over a million (from largest to smallest): Lagos, Kano, Ibadan, Benin City and Port Harcourt. Lagos is the largest city in Africa, with a population of over 12 million in its urban area.

The south of the country in particular is characterised by very strong urbanisation and a relatively large number of cities. According to an estimate from 2015, there are 20 cities in Nigeria with more than 500,000 inhabitants, including ten cities with a population of one million.

=== Law ===
The Constitution of Nigeria is the supreme law of the country. There are four distinct legal systems in Nigeria, which include English law, common law, customary law, and Sharia law:

- English law in Nigeria consists of the collection of British laws from colonial times.
- Common law is the collection of authoritative judicial decisions in the field of civil law (so-called precedents) that have been handed down in the country concerned – in this case Nigeria. (This system is mainly found in Anglo-Saxon countries; in continental Europe, on the other hand, codified and, as far as possible, abstracted civil law predominates, as in the Napoleonic Code in France).
- Customary law is derived from indigenous traditional norms and practices, including the dispute resolution meetings of pre-colonial Yoruba land secret societies and the Èkpè and Okónkò of Igboland and Ibibioland.
- Sharia in Nigeria (also known as Islamic Law) used to be used only in Northern Nigeria, where Islam is the predominant religion. It is also being used in Lagos State, Oyo State, Kwara State, Ogun State, and Osun State by Muslims. Muslim penal codes are not the same in every state and they differentiate in punishment and offences according to religious affiliation (for example, alcohol consumption and distribution).

The country has a judicial branch, the highest court of which is the Supreme Court of Nigeria.

=== Foreign relations ===
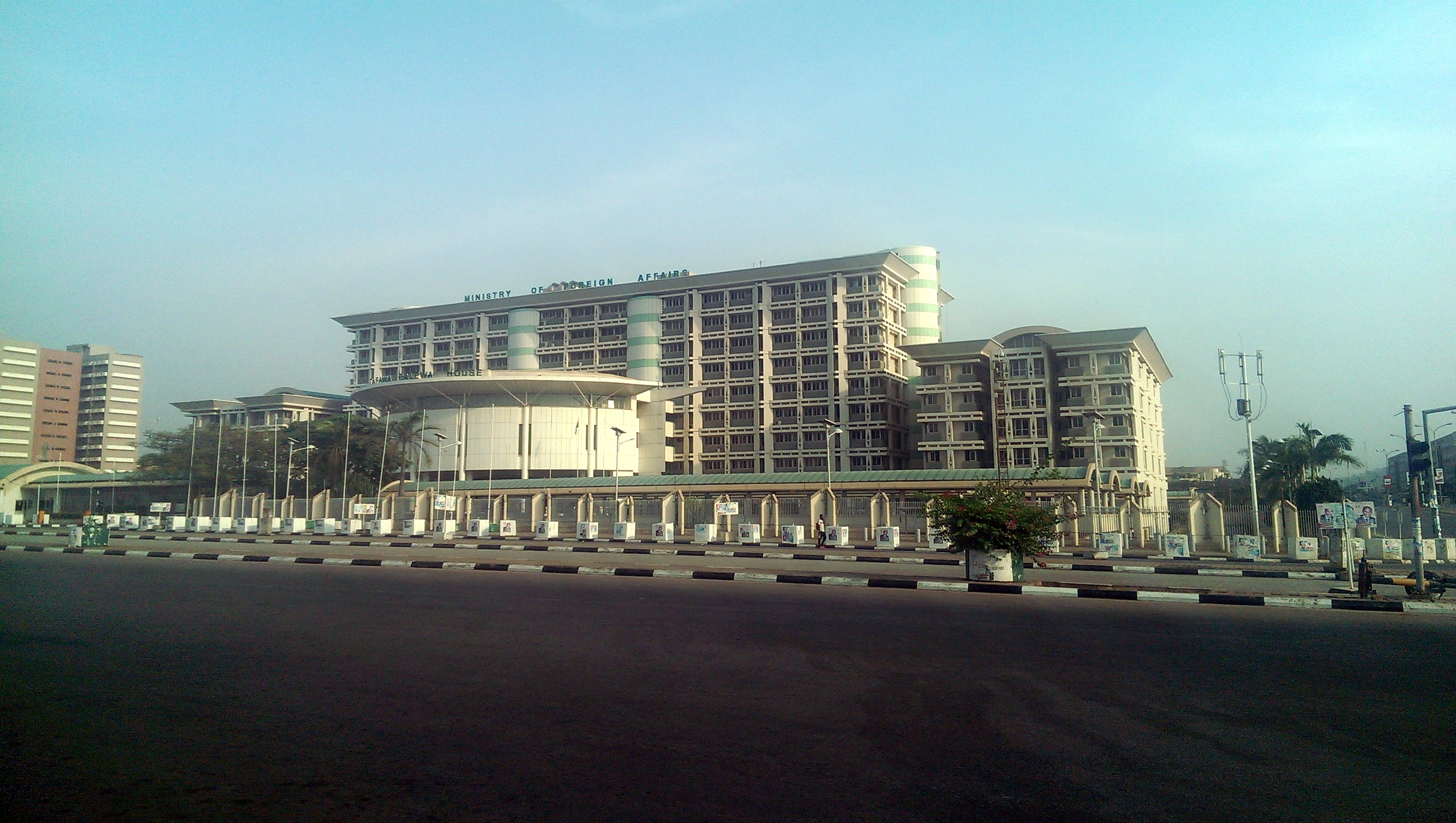
The Ministry of Foreign Affairs, Abuja

Upon gaining independence in 1960, Nigeria made African unity the centrepiece of its foreign policy. One exception to the African focus was Nigeria's close relationship with Israel throughout the 1960s. Israel sponsored and oversaw the construction of Nigeria's parliament buildings.

Nigeria's foreign policy was put to the test in the 1970s after the country emerged united from its civil war. It supported movements against white minority governments in Southern Africa. Nigeria backed the African National Congress by taking a committed tough line about the South African government. Nigeria was a founding member of the Organisation for African Unity (now the African Union) and had tremendous influence in West Africa and Africa on the whole. Nigeria played a leading role in regional integration in West Africa, partnering with neighboring states to spearhead the creation of the Economic Community of West African States (ECOWAS) in 1975. It subsequently became the primary military and financial backbone—acting as the regional standard-bearer—for the ECOWAS Monitoring Group (ECOMOG), leading peacekeeping and intervention efforts during the civil wars in Liberia and Sierra Leone.

With this Africa-centred stance, Nigeria readily sent troops to the Congo at the behest of the United Nations shortly after independence (and has maintained membership since that time). Nigeria also supported several Pan-African and pro-self-government causes in the 1970s, including garnering support for Angola's MPLA, SWAPO in Namibia, and aiding opposition to the minority governments of Portuguese Mozambique, and Rhodesia. Nigeria retains membership in the Non-Aligned Movement. In late November 2006, it organised an Africa-South America Summit in Abuja to promote what some attendees termed "South-South" linkages on a variety of fronts. Nigeria is also a member of the International Criminal Court and the Commonwealth of Nations. It was temporarily expelled from the latter in 1995 when ruled by the Abacha regime.

Nigeria has remained a key player in the international oil industry since the 1970s and maintains membership in OPEC, which it joined in July 1971. Its status as a major petroleum producer figures prominently in its sometimes volatile international relations with developed countries, notably the United States, and with developing countries.

The Agence Française de Développement (AFD) supports large infrastructure and environmental projects in Nigeria. Since 2000, Chinese–Nigerian trade relations have risen exponentially. There has been an increase in total trade of over 10.3 billion dollars between the two nations from 2000 to 2016. The CCECC and CRRC have also financed infrastructure projects (rail network, ports, airports) in Nigeria. However, the structure of the Chinese–Nigerian trade relationship has become a major political issue for the Nigerian state. Chinese exports account for around 80 per cent of total bilateral trade volumes. This has resulted in a serious trade imbalance, with Nigeria importing ten times more than it exports to China. Subsequently, Nigeria's economy is becoming over-reliant on cheap imports to sustain itself, resulting in a clear decline in Nigerian industry under such arrangements.

Continuing its Africa-centred foreign policy, Nigeria introduced the idea of a single currency for West Africa known as the Eco under the presumption that it would be led by the naira. But on 21 December 2019, Ivorian President Alassane Ouattara, Emmanuel Macron, and multiple other UEMOA states announced that they would merely rename the CFA franc instead of replacing the currency as originally intended. As of 2021, the Eco currency has been delayed to 2027.

=== Military ===
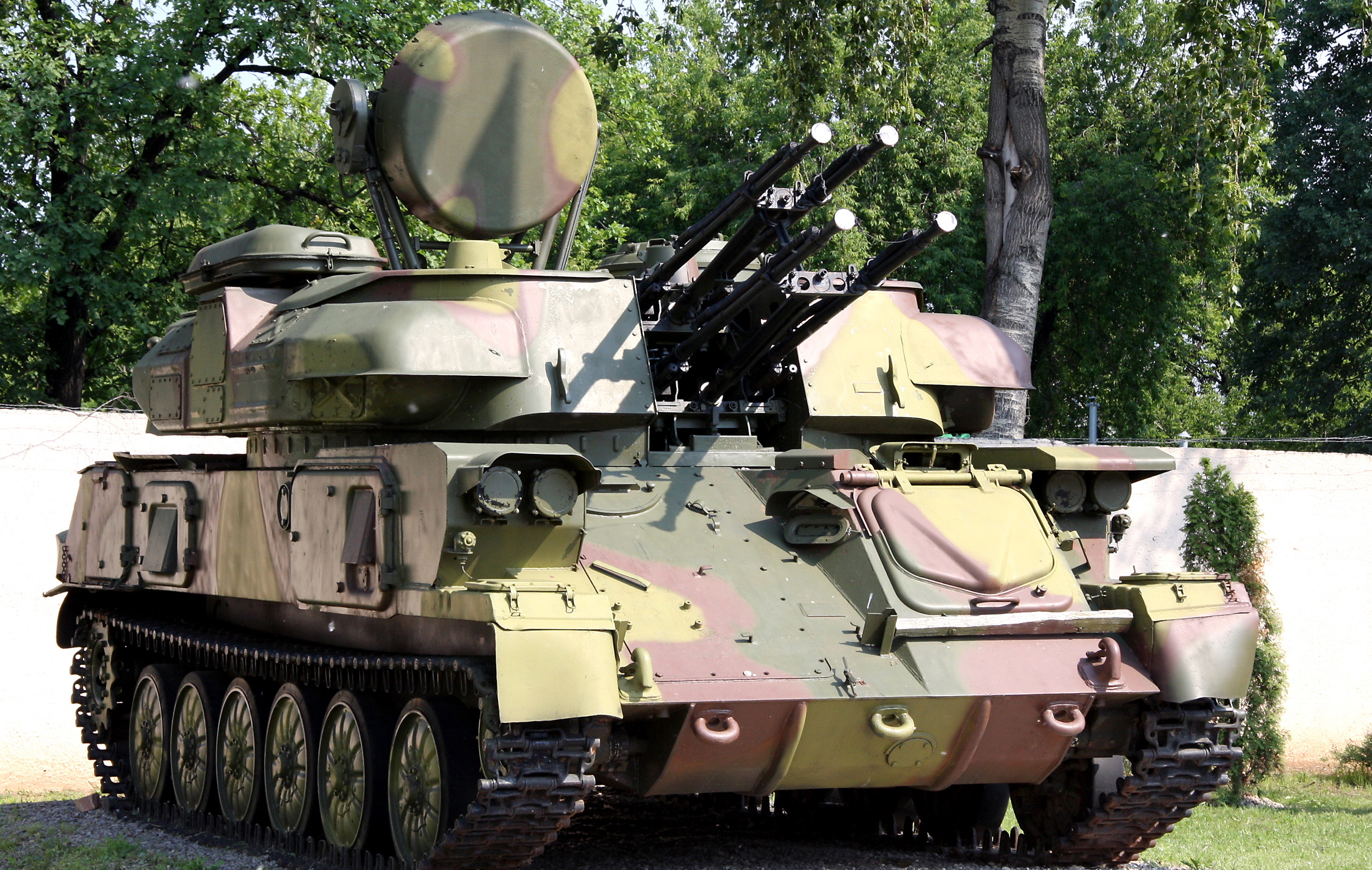
Nigerian Army self-propelled anti-aircraft gun

The Nigerian Armed Forces (AFN) are the combined military forces of Nigeria. The Nigerian military is the largest and widely recognised as the strongest military in Sub-Saharan-Africa, ranking third overall on the African continent, only behind Egypt and Algeria. It consists of three uniformed service branches: the Nigerian Army, Nigerian Navy, and Nigerian Air Force. The President of Nigeria functions as the commander-in-chief of the armed forces, exercising his constitutional authority through the Ministry of Defence, which is responsible for the management of the military and its personnel. The operational head of the AFN is the Chief of the Defence Staff, who is subordinate to the Nigerian Defence Minister. With a force of more than 223,000 active personnel, the Nigerian military is one of the largest uniformed combat services in Africa.

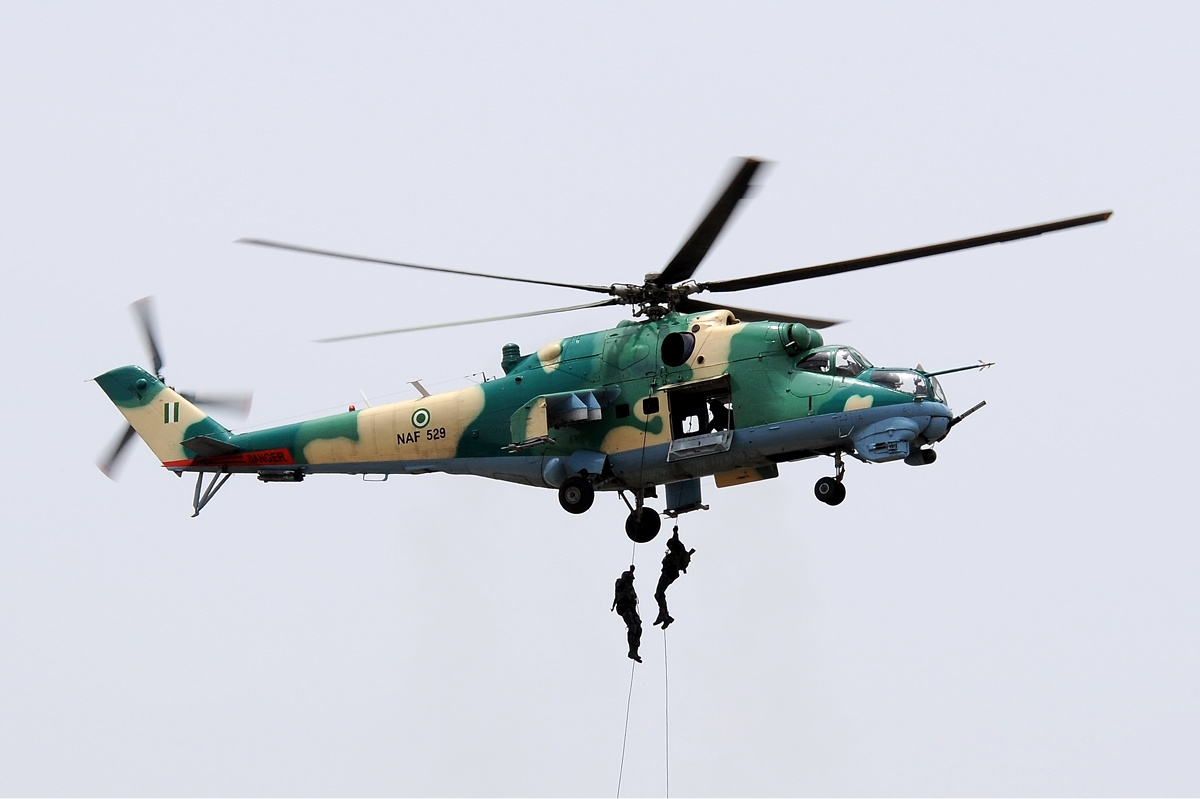
Nigerian Air Force Mi-24 attack helicopter

Nigeria had 143,000 troops in the armed forces (army 100,000, navy 25,000, air force 18,000) and another 80,000 personnel for "gendarmerie & paramilitary" in 2020, according to the International Institute for Strategic Studies. It spent just under 0.4 per cent of its economic output, or US$1.6 billion, on its armed forces in 2017. In 2022, it budgeted US$2.26 billion for the armed forces.

=== Communal conflicts ===
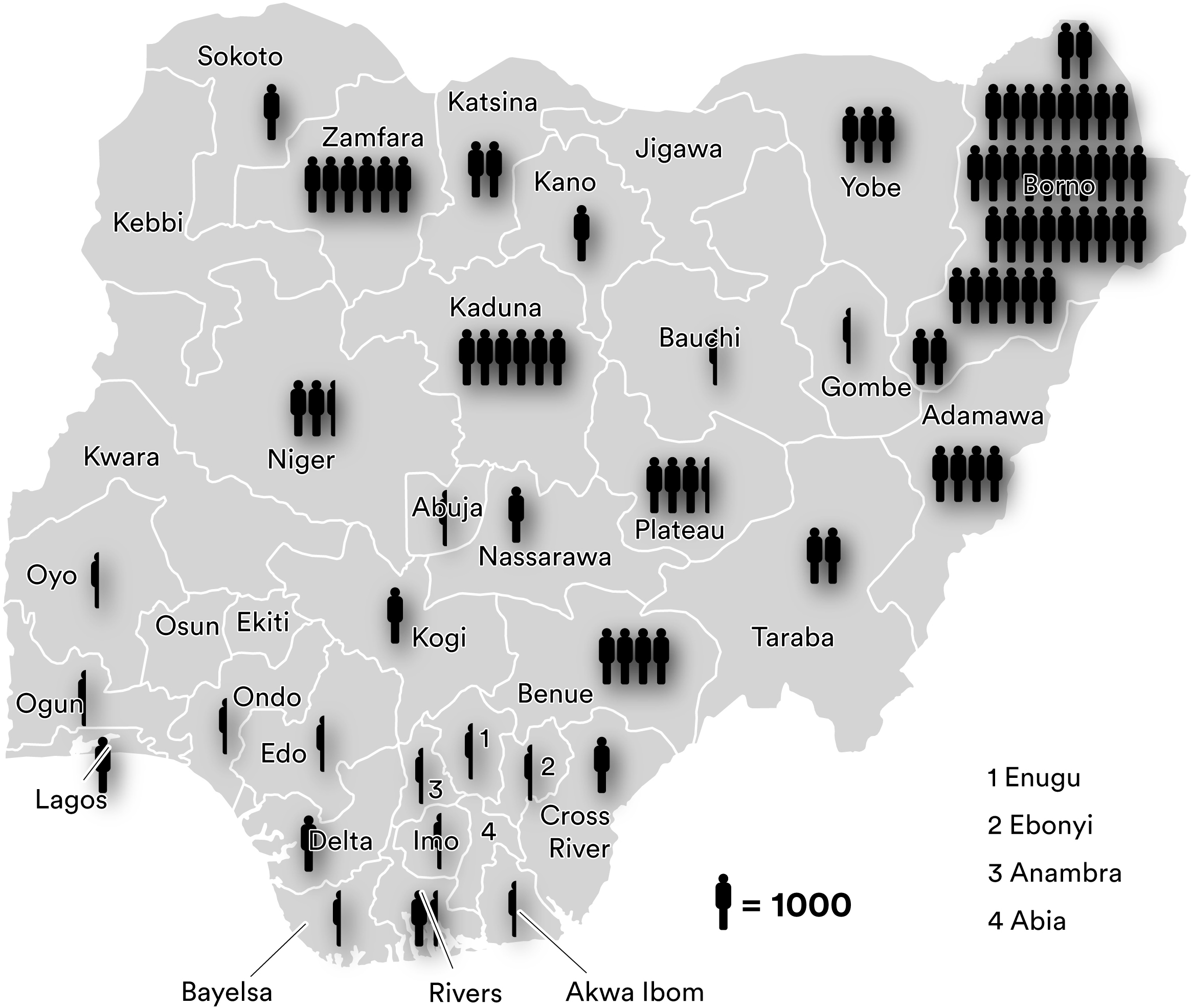
Attacks by Boko Haram, 2011 to October 2022. Each figure represents 1,000 deaths.

The predominantly Kanuri-led Boko Haram and the bandit conflict have been responsible for numerous serious attacks with thousands of casualties since mid-2010. Since then, according to the Council on Foreign Relations' Nigeria Security Tracker, over 43,200 lives have been lost to this conflict (as of June 2023). The United Nations refugee agency UNHCR counts about 1.8 million internally displaced persons and about 200,000 Nigerian refugees in neighbouring countries.

The Boko Haram-affected states agreed in February 2015 to establish an 8,700-strong Multinational Joint Task Force to jointly fight Boko Haram. By October 2015, Boko Haram had been driven out of all the cities it controlled and almost all the counties in northeastern Nigeria. In 2016, Boko Haram split and in 2022, 40,000 fighters surrendered. The splinter group ISWAP (Islamic State in West Africa) remains active.

The fight against Boko Haram, other sectarians, and criminals, has been accompanied by increasing police attacks. The Council on Foreign Relations' Nigeria Security Tracker counted 1,086 deaths from Boko Haram attacks and 290 deaths from police violence in the first 12 months of its establishment in May 2011. In the 12 months after October 2021, 2,193 people died from police violence and 498 from Boko Haram and ISWAP, according to the NST. The Nigerian police are notorious for vigilante justice.

The Niger Delta saw intense attacks on oil infrastructure in 2016 by militant groups such as the Movement for the Emancipation of the Niger Delta (MEND), the Niger Delta People's Volunteer Force (NDPVF), the Ijaw National Congress (INC) and the Pan Niger Delta Forum (PANDEF). In response, the new Buhari government pursued a dual strategy of repression and negotiation.

In late 2016, the Nigerian federal government resorted to the gambit of offering the militant groups a 4.5 billion naira (US$144 million) contract to guard oil infrastructure. Most accepted. The contract was renewed in August 2022, but led to fierce disputes among the above-mentioned groups over the distribution of the funds. Representatives speak of "war" – against each other. The high propensity for violence and the pettiness of the leaders, as well as the complete absence of social and environmental arguments in this dispute give rise to fears that the militant groups, despite their lofty names, have discarded responsibility for their region and ethnic groups and have moved into the realm of protection rackets and self-enrichment. In any case, the pipelines in the Niger Delta are not very effectively "guarded" – the pollution of the Niger Delta with stolen crude oil and illegally produced heavy fuel oil continued unhindered after 2016.

In central Nigeria, conflicts between predominantly Muslim Fulani herders and indigenous, mostly Christian farmers flared up again, especially in Kaduna, Plateau, Taraba and Benue states. In individual cases, these clashes have claimed several hundred lives. Conflict over land and resources is increasing due to the ongoing desertification in northern Nigeria, population growth and the generally tense economic situation.

In June 2022, a massacre took place in the St. Francis Xavier Church, in Owo. The Government blamed ISWAP for the murder of over 50 parishioners, but locals suspect Fulani herdsmen's involvement.

== Economy ==
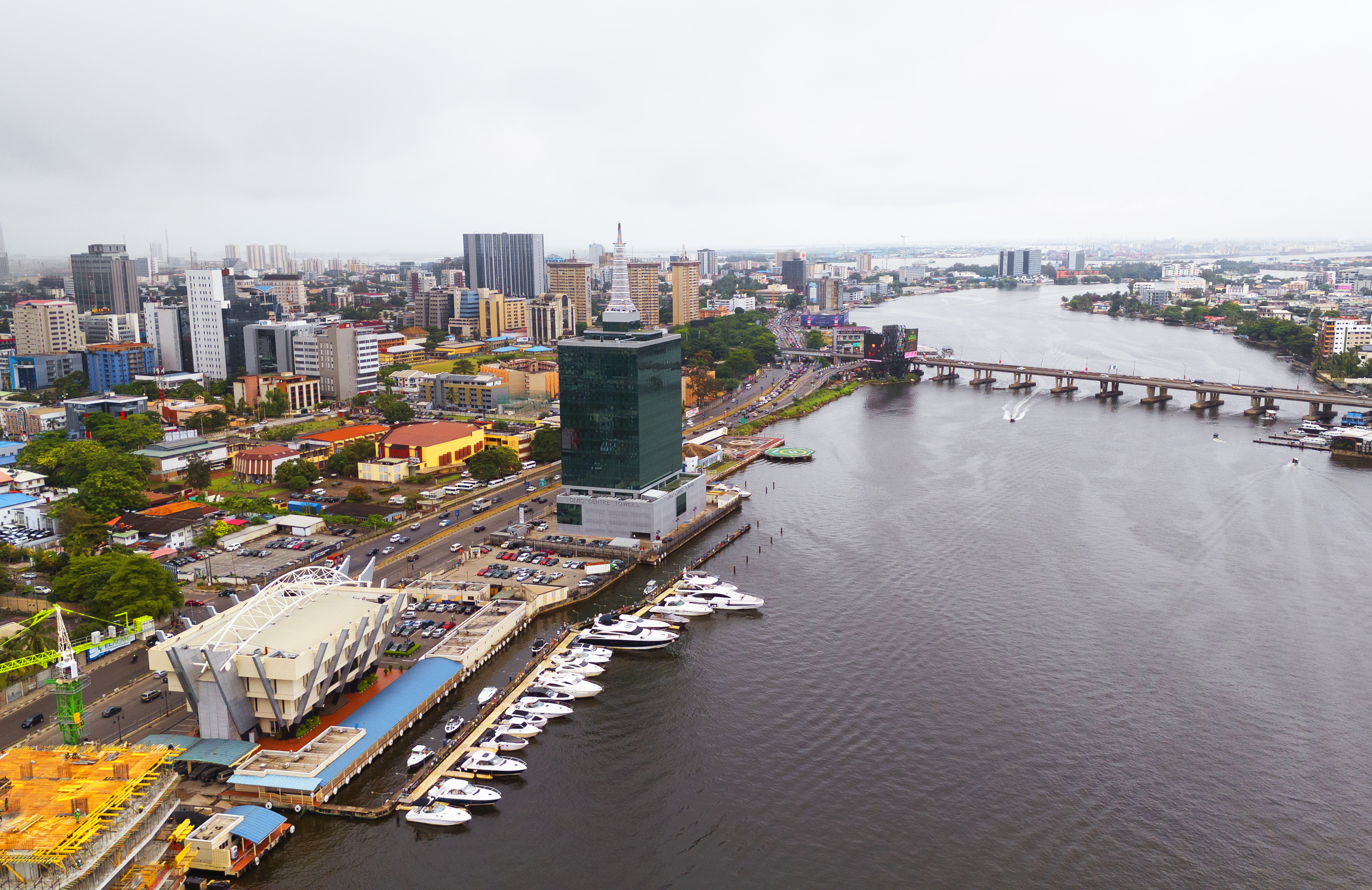
Lagos, the financial centre of Nigeria

Nigeria's economy is the third largest in Africa, the 46th-largest in the world by nominal GDP, and 19th-largest by PPP. As of 2023, Nigeria's economy is classified as lower-middle-income. Before 1999, economic development was hindered by years of military rule, corruption, and mismanagement. In the decades thereafter, the restoration of democracy and subsequent economic reforms led to rapid growth. In 2011, Citigroup projected that Nigeria would have the highest average GDP growth in the world between 2010 and 2050.

In April 2026, FTSE Russell upgraded Nigeria from ‘unclassified’ to ‘frontier market’. Moody’s and S&P upgraded Nigeria in their rankings in 2025 and 2026. Five out of seven African tech unicorns are based in Nigeria, and just under a third of all African tech start-ups originate from Nigeria. The metropolis of Lagos is the leading financial centre in West and Central Africa. Nigeria accounts for 28 per cent of all African fintech companies and is a leading hub for venture capital (VC) funding, having attracted the highest share of funding for African fintech companies – around 36 per cent – between 2020 and the first half of 2024. On 14 September 2026, the Nigerian stock market witnessed the largest initial public offering (IPO) in African history, that of the Dangote Refinery.

Alongside Ghana and Angola, Nigeria was among the African countries with the highest trade surpluses in 2025. In early 2026, Nigeria recorded its highest quarterly trade surplus since its foundation in 1914. The World Bank forecasts that Nigeria will achieve its highest economic growth in the last 10 years in 2026/2027.

Nigeria is an economic leader in Africa in several industries, including energy, financial markets, pharmaceuticals, and entertainment. Its financial services sector is well-developed, with a mix of local and international banks, asset management companies, brokerage houses, insurance companies and brokers, private equity funds, and investment banks. After petroleum, the largest source of foreign exchange earnings for Nigeria are remittances sent home by Nigerians living abroad.

Nigeria also has an abundant supply of under-exploited natural resources, including coal, bauxite, tantalite, gold, tin, iron ore, limestone, niobium, lead and zinc. The country's gold production in 2015 was 8 metric tons. Despite huge deposits of these natural resources, the mining industry in Nigeria is still in its infancy.

=== Agriculture ===
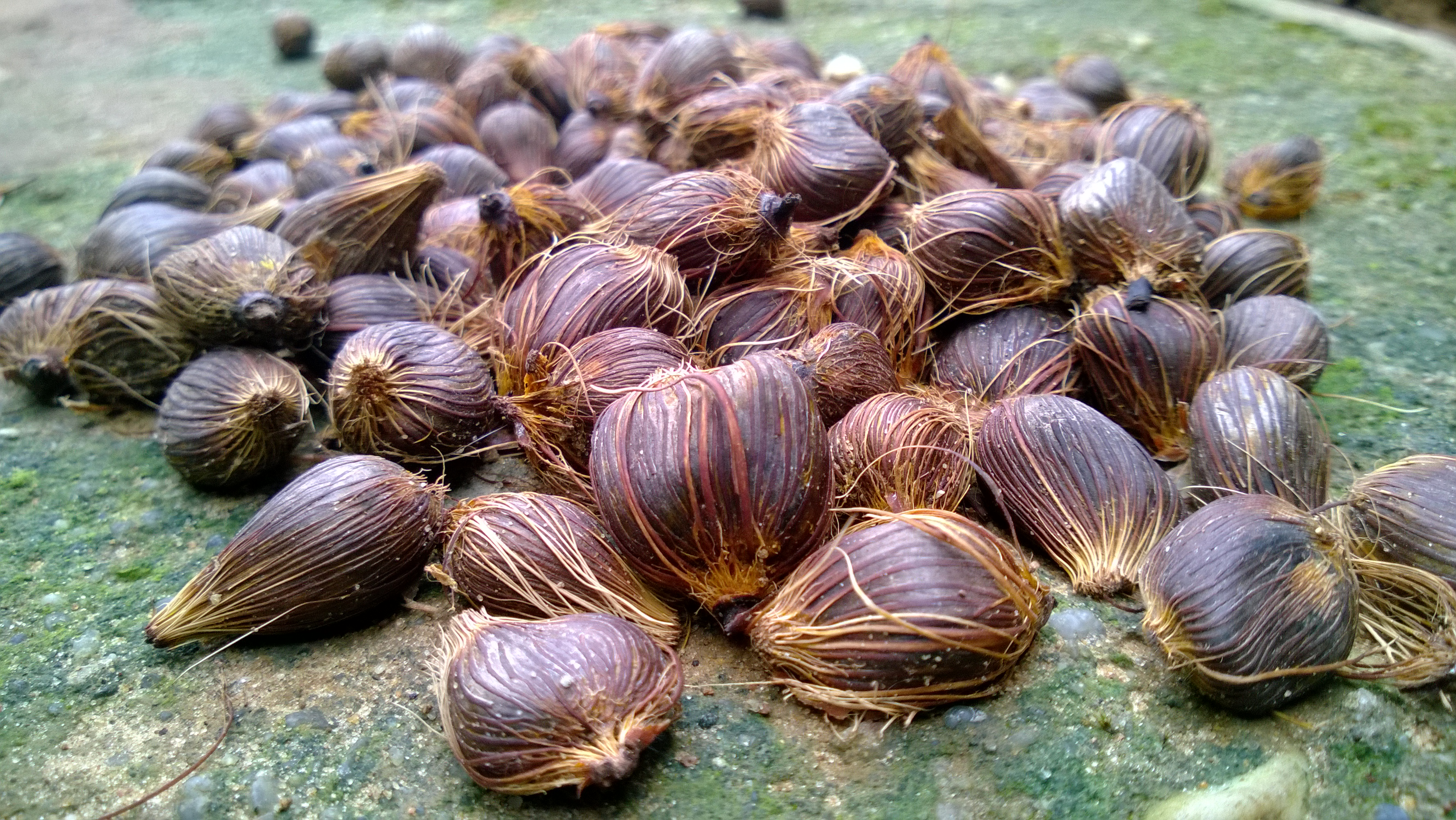
Nigerian palm nuts put out to dry

In 2021, about 23.4% of Nigeria's GDP was contributed by agriculture, forestry and fishing combined. Nigeria is the world's largest producer of cassava. Additional major crops include maize, rice, millet, yam beans, and guinea corn (sorghum). Cocoa is the principal agricultural export, and one of the country's most significant non-petroleum products. Nigeria is also one of the world's top twenty exporters of natural rubber, generating $20.9 million in 2019.

Before the Nigerian Civil War and the oil boom, Nigeria was self-sufficient in food, and agriculture was the principal foreign exchange earner. Though the Nigerian government promoted the use of inorganic fertilisers in the 1970s, agriculture failed to keep pace with population growth and Nigeria now relies upon food imports to feed its people. In 2022, it was spending US$6.7 billion yearly for food imports, four times its income from food exports.

Nigeria's rice production increased by 10% from 2017/18 to 2021/22, reaching 5 million tonnes per year, but it failed to keep up with rising demand. Consequently, rice imports remained steady at 2 million tonnes annually. In August 2019, Nigeria closed its border with Benin and other neighbouring countries to stop rice smuggling into the country as part of efforts to boost local production.

Nigeria exports unhusked rice while relying on imports for processed husked rice, the country's staple food. The rice mill in Imota, near Lagos, was opened in 2023 to handle processing domestically, improve the balance of trade, bolster the labour market, and reduce transport and middleman costs, with design targets to support 250,000 direct and indirect jobs and produce 2.5 million 50-kg bags of rice annually. However, severe shortages of raw paddy, security disruptions, and high logistics costs have prevented the facility from reaching capacity, keeping Nigeria dependent on foreign rice imports.

=== Oil and natural gas ===
Nigeria is the 15th largest producer of petroleum in the world, the 6th largest exporter, and has the 9th largest proven reserves. Petroleum plays a large role in the Nigerian economy and politics, accounting for about 80% of government earnings. Nigeria also has the 9th largest proven natural gas reserves estimated by OPEC; the government's value of its about 206.53 trillion cubic feet has been valued at $803.4 trillion. Natural gas is seen as having the potential to unlock an economic miracle on the Niger River. Nigeria each year loses to gas flaring an estimate of US$2.5 billion, and over 120,000 barrels of oil per day to crude theft in the Niger Delta, its main oil-producing region. This has led to piracy and conflict for control in the region and has led to disruptions in production preventing the country from meeting its OPEC quota and exporting petroleum at full capability.

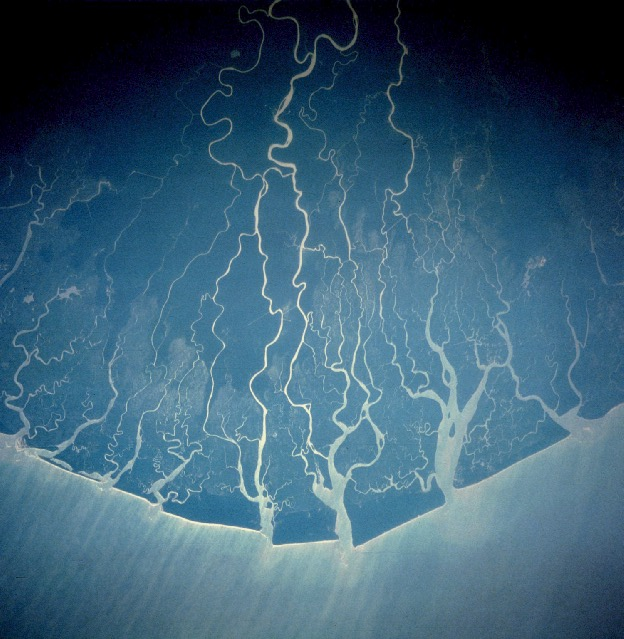
Overflight photo of the creeks of the Niger Delta

Nigeria has a total of 159 oil fields and 1,481 wells in operation according to the Department of Petroleum Resources. The most productive region of the nation is the coastal Niger Delta Basin in the Niger Delta or "south-south" region which encompasses 78 of the 159 oil fields. Most of Nigeria's oil fields are small and scattered, and as of 1990, these small fields accounted for 62.1% of all Nigerian production. This contrasts with the sixteen largest fields which produced 37.9% of Nigeria's petroleum at that time. Petrol was Nigeria's main import commodity until 2021, accounting for 24% of import volume.

The Niger Delta Nembe Creek oil field was discovered in 1973 and produces from the middle Miocene deltaic sandstone-shale in an anticline structural trap at a depth of 2 to 4 kilometres (7,000 to 13,000 feet). In June 2013, Shell announced a strategic review of its operations in Nigeria, hinting that assets could be divested. While many international oil companies have operated there for decades, by 2014 most were making moves to divest their interests, citing a range of issues including oil theft. In August 2014, Shell said it was finalising its interests in four Nigerian oil fields.

The supply of natural gas to Europe, threatened by the Russo-Ukrainian war, pushed projects to transport Nigerian natural gas via pipelines to Morocco or Algeria. As of May 2022, however, there are no results on this yet.

Thanks to the success of the Dangote refinery, which opened in 2023, Nigeria is transforming from an oil exporter into a fuel and fertiliser exporter.

=== Energy ===
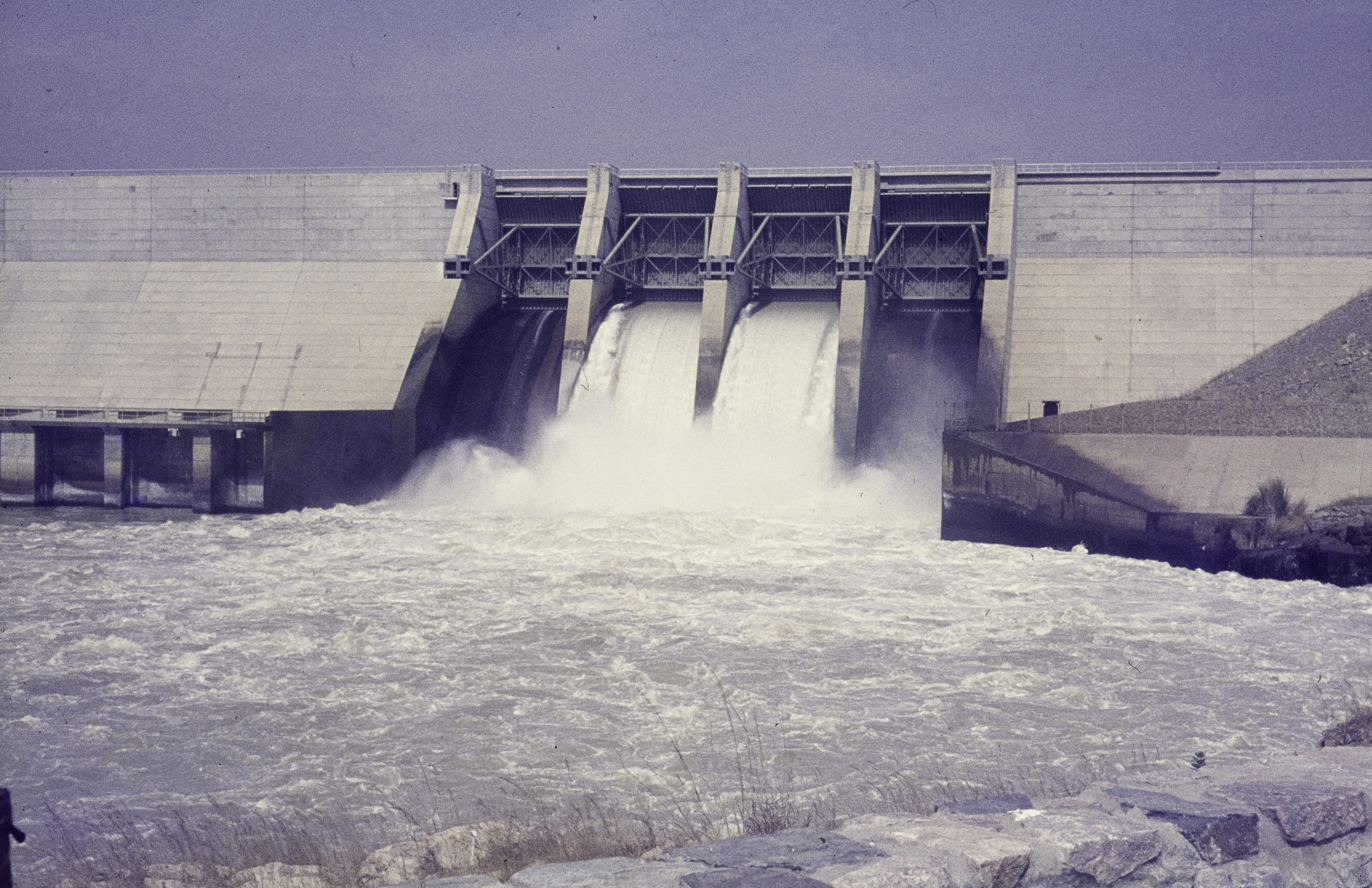
Kainji Dam on the Niger River, built in the 1960s

Nigeria's energy consumption is much more than its generation capacity. Most of the energy comes from traditional fossil fuels, which account for 73% of total primary production. The rest is from hydropower (27%). Since independence, Nigeria has tried to develop a domestic nuclear industry for energy. Nigeria opened 2004 a Chinese-origin research reactor at Ahmadu Bello University and has sought the support of the International Atomic Energy Agency to develop plans for up to 4,000 MW of nuclear capacity by 2027 according to the National Program for the Deployment of Nuclear Power for Generation of Electricity. In 2007, President Umaru Yar'Adua urged the country to embrace nuclear power to meet its growing energy needs. In 2017, Nigeria signed the UN Treaty on the Prohibition of Nuclear Weapons. In April 2015, Nigeria began talks with Russia's state-owned Rosatom to collaborate on the design, construction and operation of four nuclear power plants by 2035, the first of which will be in operation by 2025. In June 2015, Nigeria selected two sites for the planned construction of the nuclear plants. Neither the Nigerian government nor Rosatom would disclose the specific locations of the sites, but it is believed that the nuclear plants will be sited in Akwa Ibom State and Kogi State. The sites are planned to house two plants each. In 2017 agreements were signed for the construction of the Itu nuclear power plant.

==== Electricity ====
According to the survey, 94% of Nigerians are connected to the national grid, but only 57% have their electricity consumption recorded by an electricity meter. Only 1% of Nigerians surveyed reported having electricity 24 hours a day. 68% have electricity 1 to 9 hours a day, according to the NIO. Two-thirds of Nigerians, or 66%, pay up to 10,000 Naira (US$13) a month for electricity, which is almost 3% of the average income in Nigeria. Over two-thirds of respondents, or 67%, were willing to pay more for uninterrupted electricity supply. Power generators are owned by 21% of Nigerians, while 14% use solar energy.

=== Manufacturing and technology ===
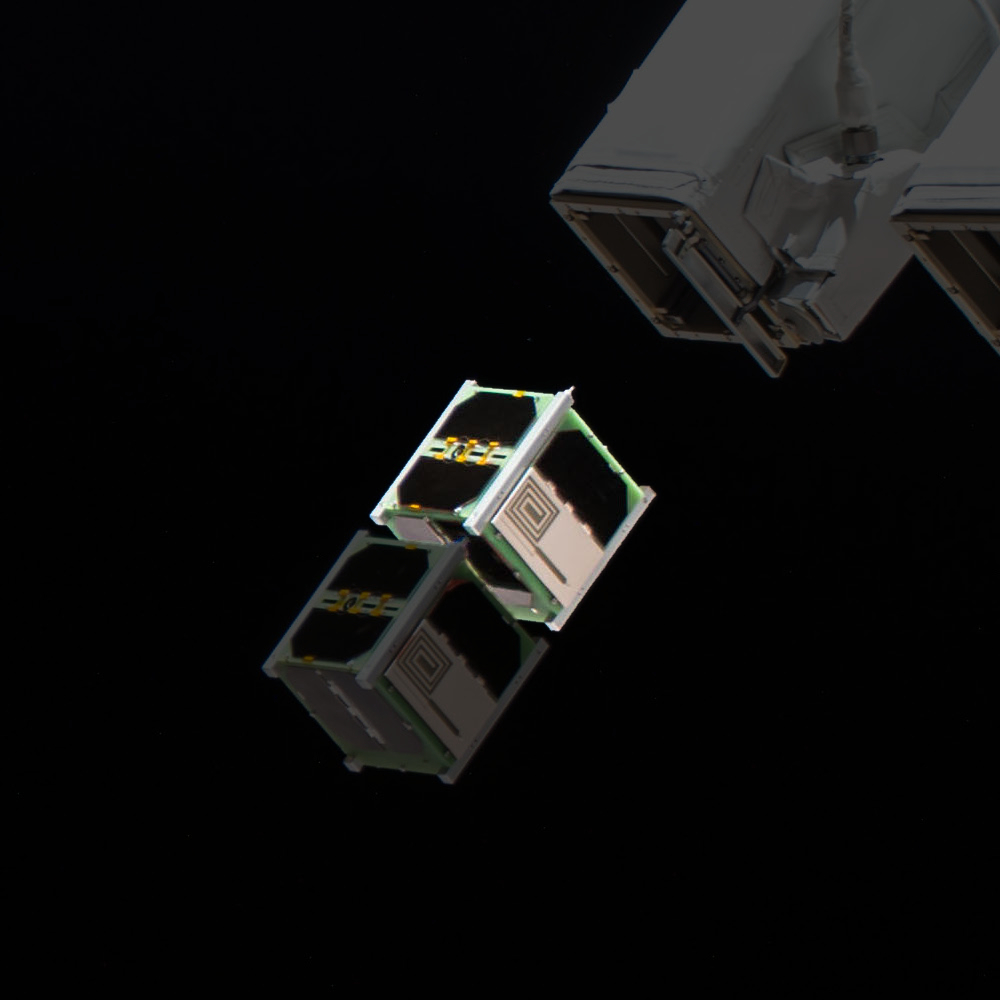
Nigeria EduSat-1, the first satellite built by Nigeria by the Federal University of Technology Akure

Nigeria has a manufacturing industry that includes leather and textiles (centred in Kano, Abeokuta, Onitsha, and Lagos), plastics and processed food. Ogun is considered to be Nigeria's current industrial hub, as most factories are located in Ogun and more companies are moving there, followed by Lagos. The city of Aba in the south-eastern part of the country is well known for handicrafts and shoes, known as "Aba made". Nigeria has a market of 720,000 cars per year, but less than 20% of these are produced domestically.

In 2016, Nigeria was the leading cement producer south of the Sahara, ahead of South Africa. Aliko Dangote, Nigeria's richest inhabitant, based his wealth on cement production, as well as agricultural commodities. According to its own information, the Ajaokuta Steel Company Limited produces 1.3 million tonnes of steel per year. However, steel plants in Katsina, Jos and Osogbo no longer appear to be active.

In June 2019, Nigeria EduSat-1 was deployed from the International Space Station. It is the first satellite that was built in Nigeria, which followed many other Nigerian satellites that were built by other countries. (Note: NigeriaSat-1, NigeriaSat-2, NigeriaSat-X, NigComSat-1, and NigComSat-1R) In 2021, Nigeria hosts about 60 percent of the pharmaceutical production capacity in Africa, the larger pharmaceutical companies are located in Lagos. The pharmaceutical producer with the most employees in Nigeria is Emzor Pharmaceutical Industries Ltd. Nigeria has a few electronic manufacturers like Zinox, the first branded Nigerian computer, and manufacturers of electronic gadgets such as tablet PCs. As of January 2022, Nigeria is the host to 5 out of the 7 unicorn companies in Africa.

=== Internet and telecommunications ===
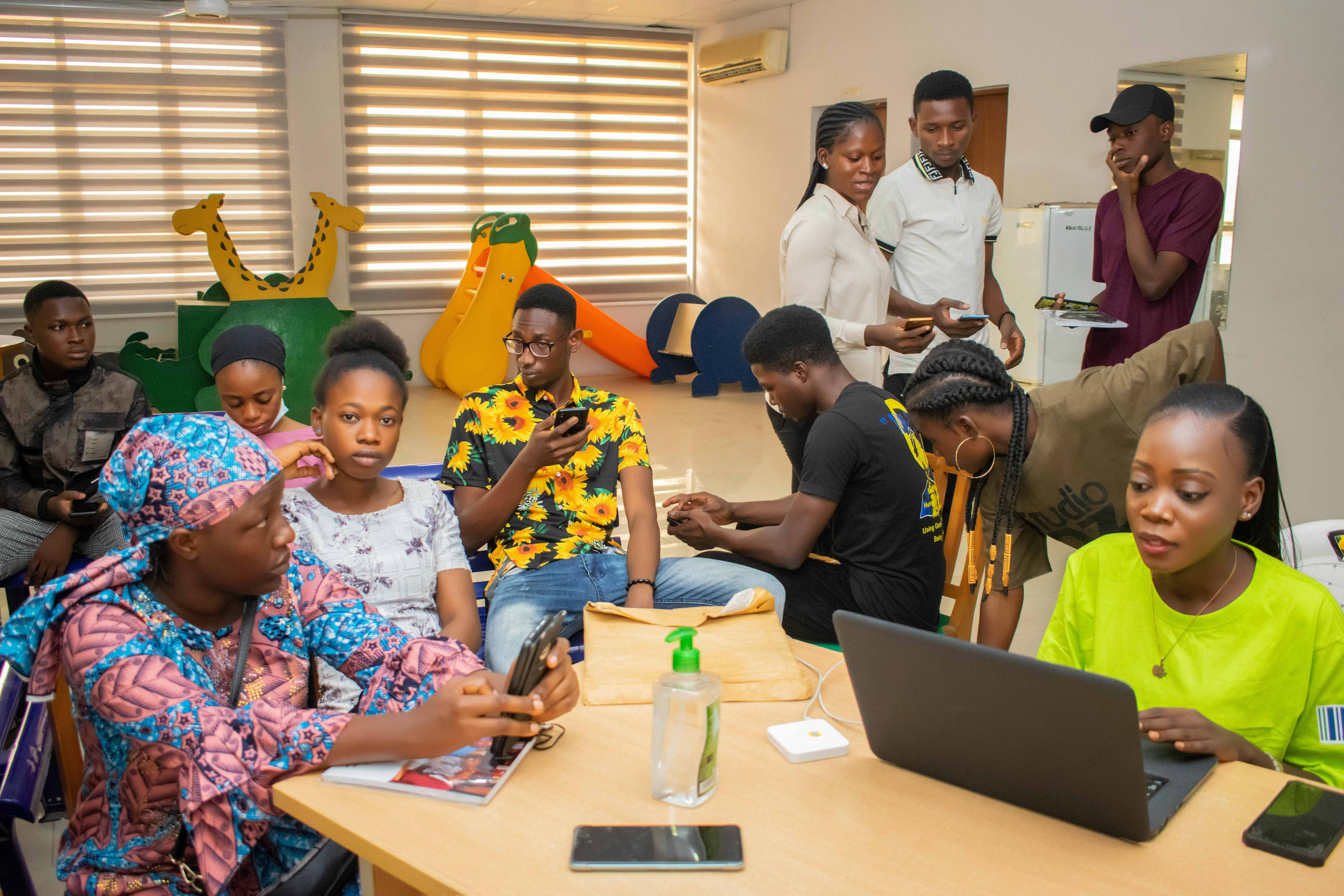
Nigerian librarians editing the Wikidata database

The Nigerian telecommunications market is one of the fastest-growing in the world, with major emerging market operators (like MTN, 9mobile, Airtel and Globacom) basing their largest and most profitable centres in the country. Nigeria's ICT sector has experienced much growth, representing 10% of the nation's GDP in 2018 as compared to just 1% in 2001. Lagos is regarded as one of the largest technology hubs in Africa with its thriving tech ecosystem. According to a survey by the GSM Association, 92% of adult Nigerian men and 88% of women owned a mobile phone. Using various measures including but not limited to illegal arrest, taking down of websites, passport seizures, and restricted access to bank accounts, the Nigerian government is punishing citizens for expressing themselves on the internet and working to stifle internet freedom.

=== Tourism ===
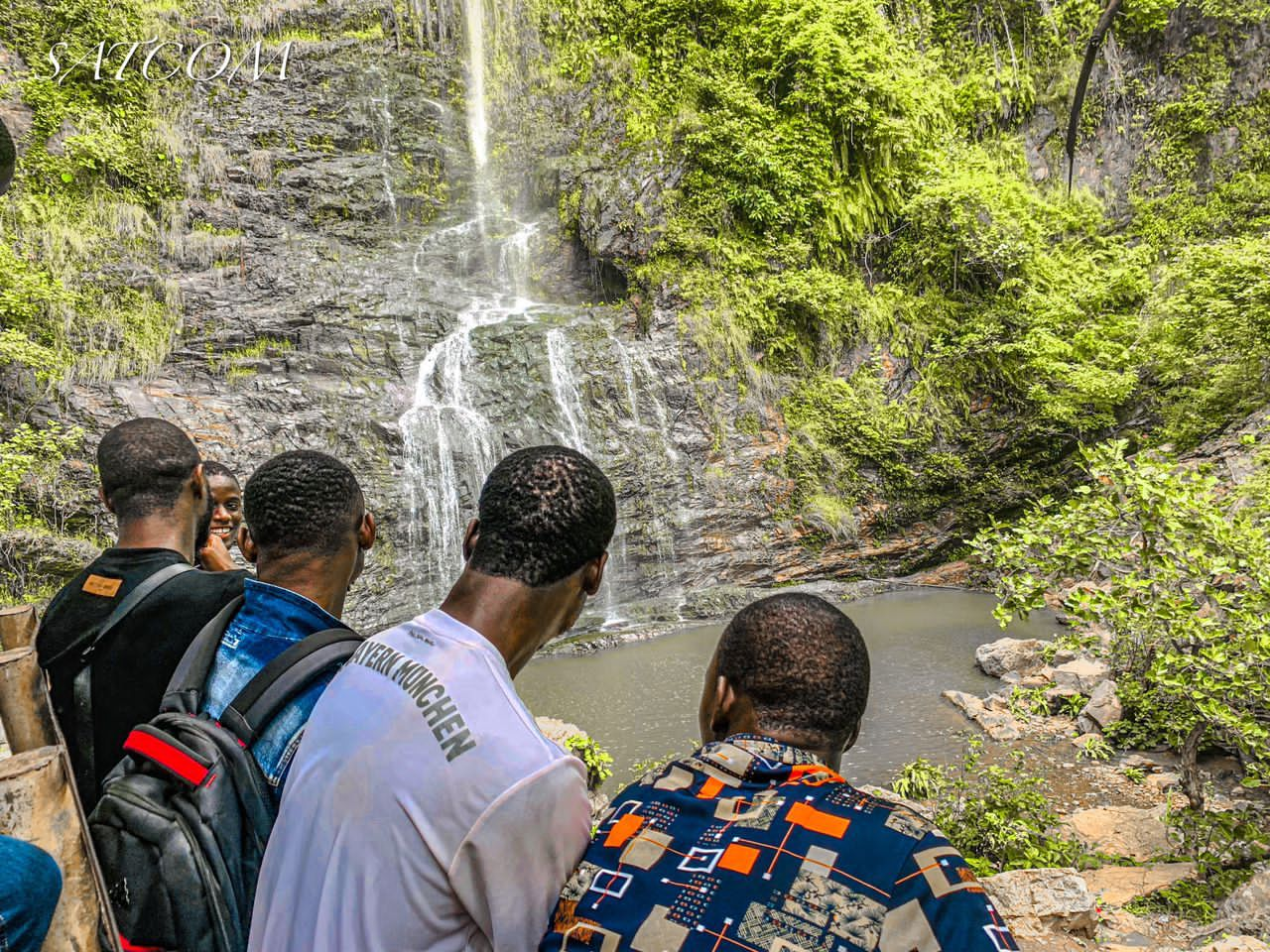
Owu waterfalls, visited by Nigerian undergraduates

Tourism in Nigeria centres largely on events, because of the country's ample amount of ethnic groups, but also includes rain forests, savannahs, waterfalls, and other natural attractions. Abuja is home to several parks and green areas. The largest, Millennium Park, was designed by architect Manfredi Nicoletti and officially opened in December 2003. After the re-modernisation project achieved by the administration of Governor Raji Babatunde Fashola, Lagos is gradually becoming a major tourist destination. Lagos is currently taking steps to become a global city. The 2009 Eyo carnival (a yearly festival originating from Iperu Remo, Ogun State) was a step toward world city status. Currently, Lagos is primarily known as a business-oriented and fast-paced community. Lagos has become an important location for African and black cultural identity.

Lagos has sandy beaches by the Atlantic Ocean, including Elegushi Beach and Alpha Beach. Lagos also has many private beach resorts including Inagbe Grand Beach Resort and several others in the outskirts. Lagos has a variety of hotels ranging from three-star to five-star hotels, with a mixture of local hotels such as Eko Hotels and Suites, Federal Palace Hotel and franchises of multinational chains such as Intercontinental Hotel, Sheraton, and Four Points by Sheraton. Other places of interest include the Tafawa Balewa Square, Festac town, The Nike Art Gallery, Freedom Park, and the Cathedral Church of Christ.

=== Transport ===
Due to Nigeria's location in the centre of West Africa, transport plays a major role in the national service sector. Government investments have seen an increase in extensive road repairs and new construction has been carried out gradually as states in particular spend their share of increased government allocations. Representative of these improvements is the Second Niger Bridge near Onitsha, which was largely completed in 2022. A 2017 World Bank report on logistics hubs in Africa placed the country in fourth place, behind Côte d'Ivoire, Senegal, and Sao Tome, but in 2021, Nigeria joined the World Logistics Passport, a private sector group working to increase the efficiency of global trade.

==== Roads ====
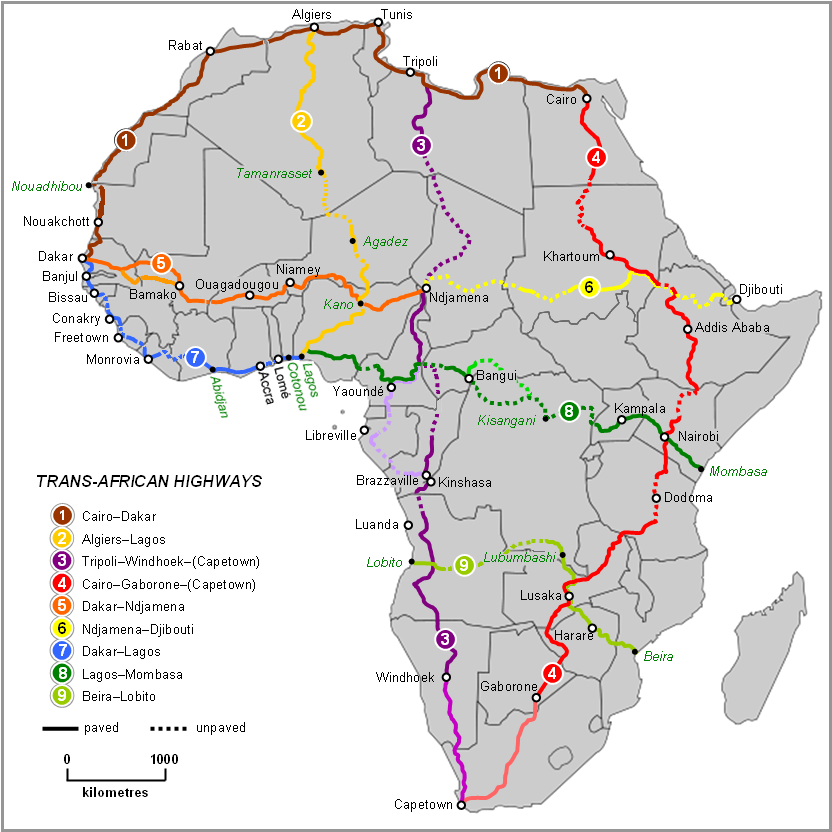
Map of trans-African automobile routes

Four trans-African automobile routes pass through Nigeria:

- Lagos-Mombasa Highway
- Algiers-Lagos Highway
- Dakar-Lagos Highway
- Dakar-Ndjamena Highway

Nigeria has the largest road network in West Africa. It covers about 200,000 km, of which 60,000 km are asphalted. Nigeria's roads and highways handle 90% of all passenger and freight traffic. It contributes N2.4trn ($6.4bn) to GDP in 2020. The federal government is responsible for 35,000 km of the road network. The motorway links of important economic centres such as Lagos-Ibadan, Lagos-Badagry and Enugu-Onitsha have been renovated.

The rest of the road network is a state matter and therefore in very different shape, depending on the state. Economically strong states such as Lagos, Anambra and Rivers receive particularly poor evaluations. Most roads were built in the 1980s and early 1990s. Poor maintenance and inferior materials have worsened the condition of the roads. Travelling is very difficult. Especially during the rainy season, the use of secondary roads is sometimes almost impossible due to potholes. Road bandits often take advantage of this situation for their criminal purposes.

==== Rail transport ====
Railways have undergone a massive revamping with projects such as the Lagos-Kano Standard Gauge Railway being completed connecting cities of Kano, Kaduna, Abuja, Ibadan and Lagos. Lagos Rail Mass Transit controls transport in Lagos with two currently operating services: the Red Line and the Blue Line. Abuja Light Rail controls rail services in Abuja and currently has one operating service, the Blue Line.

==== Air transport ====
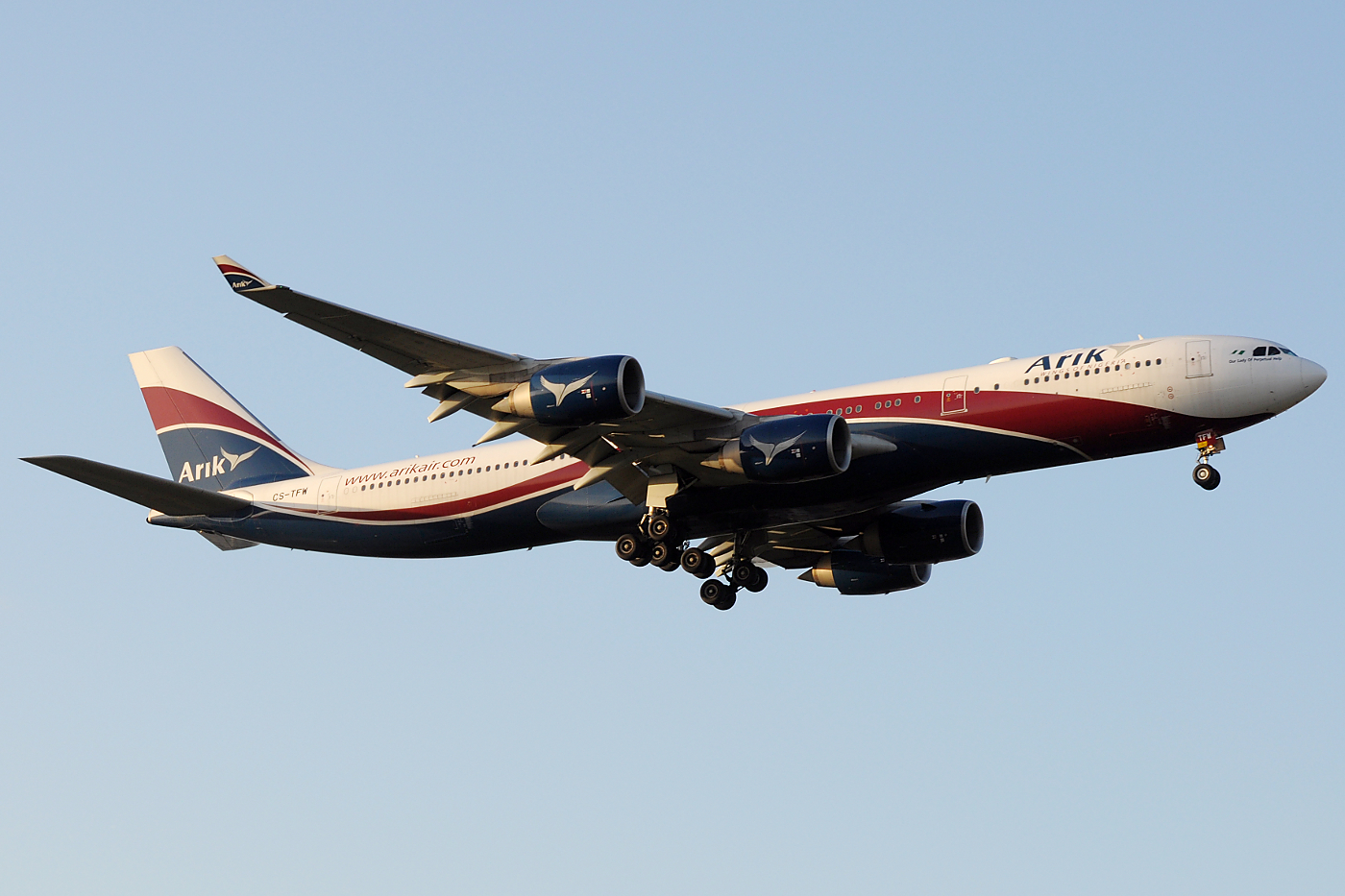
An A340-500 of Arik Air

The Nigerian aviation industry generated 198.62 billion naira (€400 million) in 2019, representing a contribution of 0.14% to GDP. It was the fastest-growing sector of the Nigerian economy in 2019. Passenger traffic increased from 9,358,166 in 2020 to 15,886,955 in 2021, a significant increase of over 69%. Aircraft movements increased by more than 46% from 2020 to 2021. Total freight volumes were 191 tonnes in 2020 but increased to 391 tonnes in 2021. In December 2021, the Anambra International Cargo Airport started its operation. In April 2022, the second terminal of the Murtala Muhammed International Airport has been inaugurated. It will increase the capacity of the airport to 14 million passengers per year.

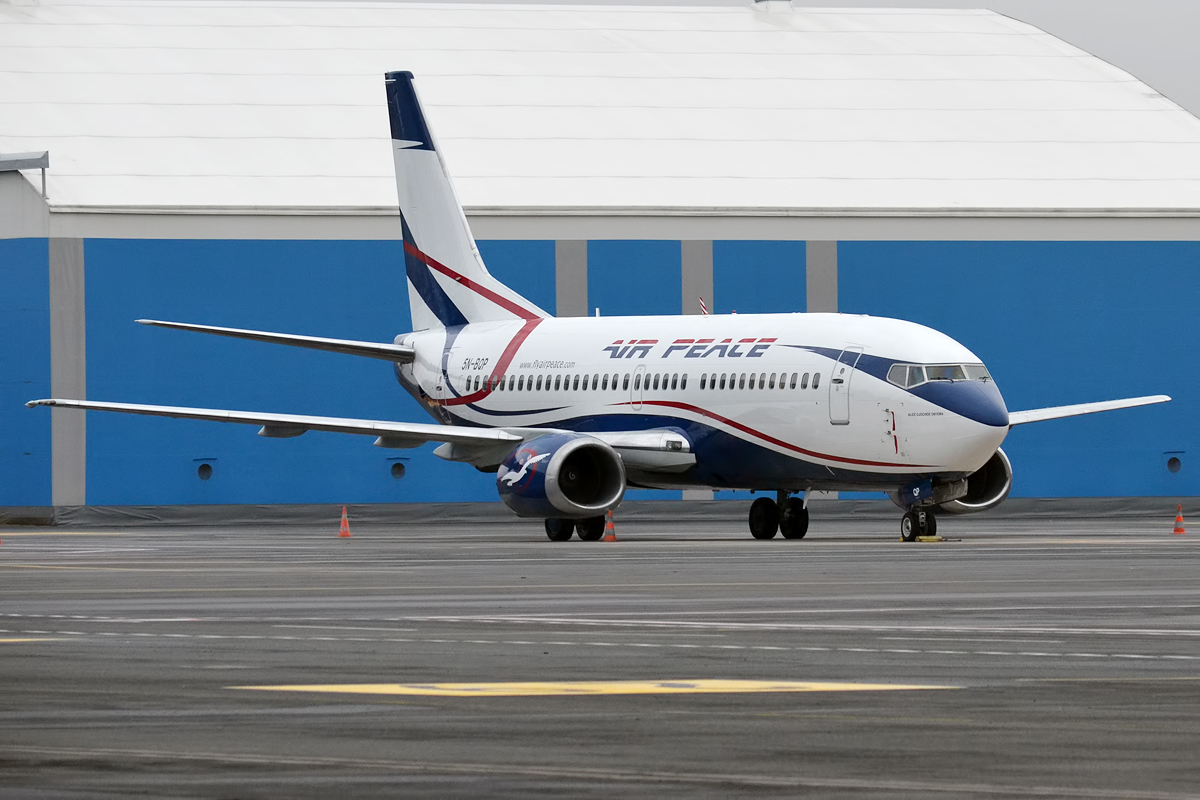
B737-300 of Air Peace

There are 54 airports in Nigeria, The principal airports are:

- Murtala Muhammed International Airport in Lagos,
- Nnamdi Azikiwe International Airport in Abuja,
- Mallam Aminu Kano International Airport in Kano,
- Akanu Ibiam International Airport in Enugu and
- Port Harcourt International Airport in Port Harcourt.

Nigeria had in the past operated a state-owned airline Nigeria Airways which was over-indebted in 2003 and was bought by the British Virgin Group; since 28 June 2005, it has flown under the name Virgin Nigeria Airways. At the end of 2008, the Virgin Group announced its withdrawal from the airline; since September 2009 the airline has been operating as Nigerian Eagle Airlines. The largest airline in Nigeria is privately owned Air Peace, founded in 2012.

== Demographics ==
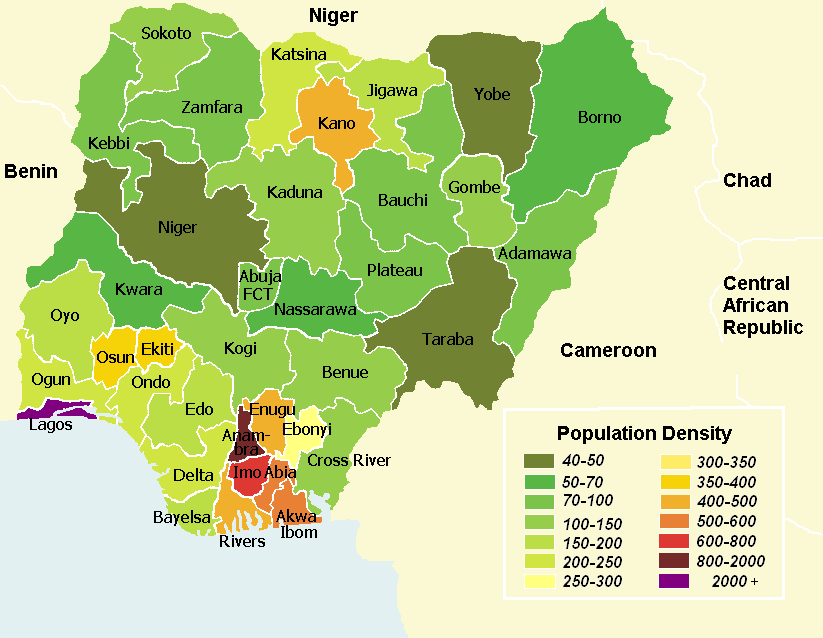
Population density (persons per square kilometre) in Nigeria

The United Nations estimates that the population of Nigeria in 2021 was 213,401,323. It was distributed as 51.7% rural and 48.3% urban, and with a population density of 167.5 people per square kilometre. Around 42.5% of the population were 14 years or younger, 19.6% were aged 15–24, 30.7% were aged 25–54, 4.0% were aged 55–64, and 3.1% were aged 65 years or older. The median age in 2017 was 18.4 years. Nigeria is the world's sixth-most populous country. The birth rate is 35.2 births/1,000 population and the death rate is 9.6 deaths/1,000 population as of 2017, while the total fertility rate is 5.07 children born/woman. Nigeria's population increased by 57 million from 1990 to 2008, a 60% growth rate in less than two decades. Nigeria is the most populous country in Africa and accounts for about 17% of the continent's total population as of 2017; however, exactly how populous is a subject of speculation.

Historical population of Nigeria (1950–2020)

Millions of Nigerians have emigrated during times of economic hardship, primarily to Europe, North America and Australia. It is estimated that over a million Nigerians have emigrated to the United States and constitute the Nigerian American populace. Individuals in many such Diasporic communities have joined the "Egbe Omo Yoruba" society, a national association of Yoruba descendants in North America. Nigeria's largest city is Lagos. Lagos has grown from about 300,000 in 1950 to an estimated 13.4 million in 2017.

Nigeria has more than 250 ethnic groups, with varying languages and customs, creating a country of rich ethnic diversity. The three largest ethnic groups are the Hausa, Yoruba and Igbo, together accounting for more than 60% of the population, while the Edo, Ijaw, Fulɓe, Kanuri, Urhobo-Isoko, Ibibio, Ebira, Nupe, Gbagyi, Jukun, Igala, Idoma, Ogoni and Tiv account for between 35 and 40%; other minorities make up the remaining 5%. The Middle Belt of Nigeria is known for its diversity of ethnic groups, including the Atyap, Berom, Goemai, Igala, Kofyar, Pyem, and Tiv. There are small minorities of British, American, Indian, Chinese (est. 50,000), white Zimbabwean, Japanese, Greek, Syrian and Lebanese immigrants. Immigrants also include those from other West African or East African nations.

=== Languages ===
Map of Nigeria's linguistic groups

The major languages spoken in Nigeria represent three major families of languages of Africa: the majority are Niger-Congo languages, such as Igbo, Yoruba, Ibibio, Ijaw, Fulfulde, Ogoni, and Edo. Kanuri, spoken in the northeast, primarily in Borno and Yobe State, is part of the Nilo-Saharan family, and Hausa is an Afroasiatic language. Some of the largest of these have derived standardised languages from several different dialects and are widely spoken by their respective ethnic groups. The official language of Nigeria, English, was chosen to facilitate the cultural and linguistic unity of the country, owing to the influence of British colonisation which ended in 1960. Nigerian Pidgin English, first used by British and African slavers to facilitate the Atlantic slave trade in the late 17th century, has replaced the native language for many Nigerians. Of the 525 known languages that have been spoken in Nigeria at some time in its history, eight are now extinct. Often known simply as "Pidgin" or "Broken" (Broken English), Nigerian Pidgin English became a popular lingua franca, though with varying regional influences on dialect and slang. It is widely spoken within the Niger Delta Region.

In some areas of Nigeria, ethnic groups speak more than one language. Many French speakers from surrounding countries have influenced the English spoken in the border regions of Nigeria and some Nigerian citizens have become fluent enough in French to work in the surrounding countries. Despite the official declaration of French as the second official language in 1996 by General Sani Abacha, the policy has remained largely theoretical. Inadequate qualified teachers, lack of sustained political will, and the dominance of English have prevented the country from becoming fully bilingual.

=== Religion ===
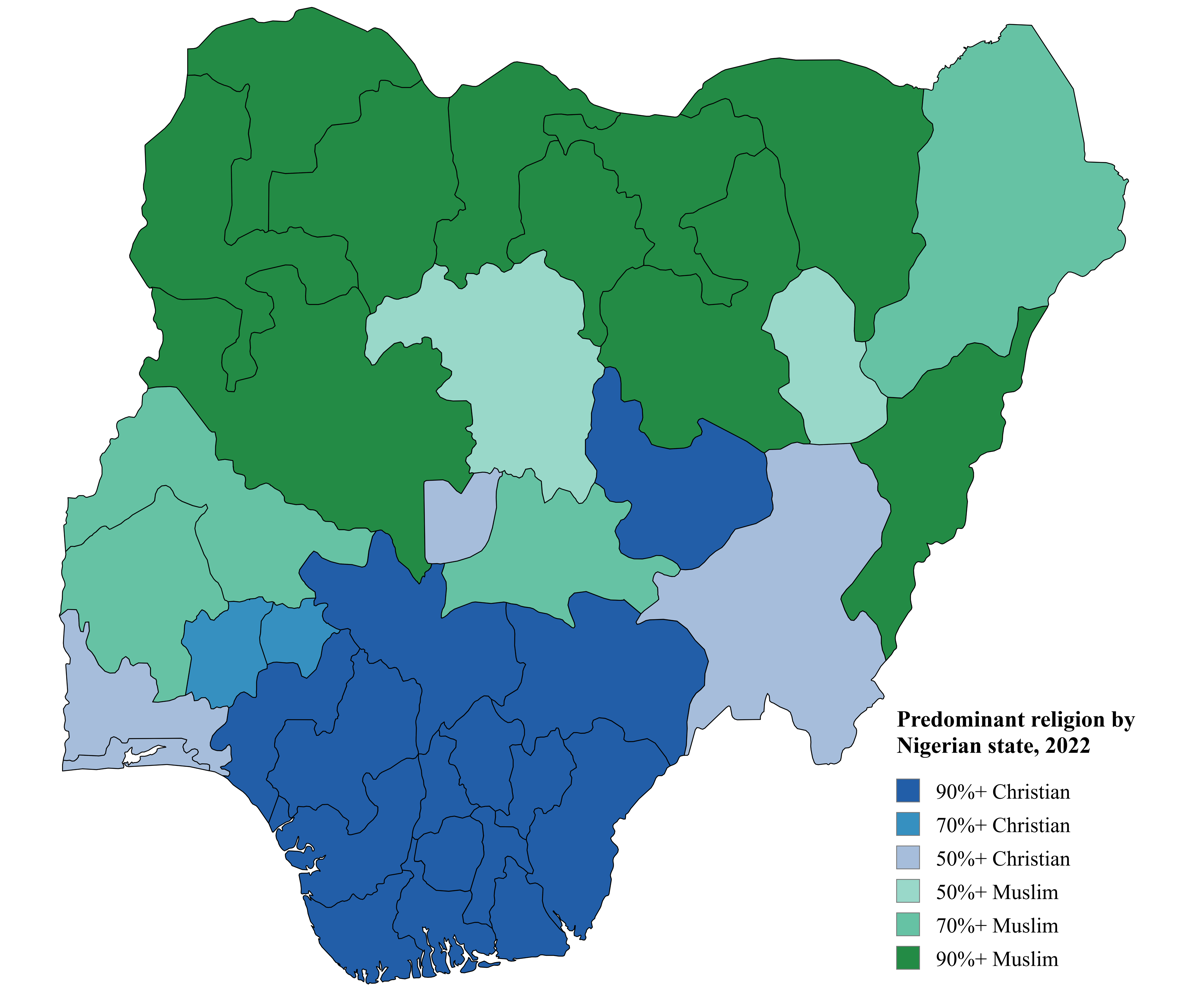
Predominant religion by Nigerian state according to the 2022 Afrobarometer survey

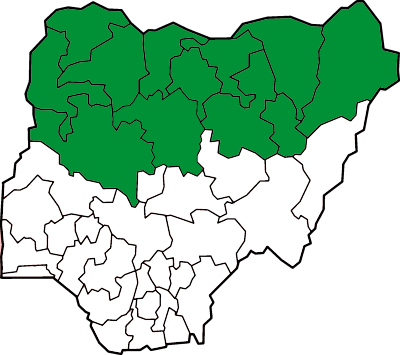
Nigerian states that implement some form of sharia law (in green)

Nigeria is a Muslim-plularity country with a sizeable Christian minority, as well as a tiny minority of adherents of traditional African religions and other religions. The Christian share of Nigeria's population is in decline because of the lower fertility rate compared to Muslims in the country. As in other parts of Africa where Islam and Christianity are dominant, religious syncretism with the traditional African religions is common.

A 2012 report on religion and public life by the Pew Research Center stated that in 2010, 49.3% of Nigeria's population was Christian, 48.8% was Muslim, and 1.9% were followers of indigenous and other religions (such as the Bori in the North) or unaffiliated. However, in a report released by Pew Research Center in 2015, the Muslim population was estimated to be 50%, and by 2060, according to the report, Muslims will account for about 60% of the country. The 2010 census of Association of Religion Data Archives has also reported that 48.8% of the total population was Christian, slightly larger than the Muslim population of 43.4%, while 7.5% were members of other religions. However, these estimates should be taken with caution because sample data is mostly collected from major urban areas in the south, which are predominantly Christian. According to a 2018 estimate in The World Factbook by the CIA, the population is estimated to be 53.5% Muslim, 45.9% Christian (10.6% Catholic and 35.3% Protestant and other Christian), and 0.6% as other. As of 2020, the Pew Research Center reported that Nigeria's Muslim majority numbered around 56.1% while the country's Christian share had declined to 43%.

Islam dominates northwestern Nigeria and northeastern Nigeria (Kanuri, Fulani and other groups). In the west, the Yoruba people are predominantly Christian with a significant Muslim minority in addition to a few adherents of traditional religions. Protestant and locally cultivated Christianity are widely practised in Western areas, while Catholicism is a more prominent Christian feature of southeastern Nigeria. Both Roman Catholicism and Protestantism are observed in the Ibibio, Efik, Ijo and Ogoni lands of the south. The Igbos (predominant in the east) and the Ibibio (south) are 98% Christian, with 2% practising traditional religions. Charismatic religious groups such as the Pentecostal churches (18 per cent of the population) play a major role. The middle belt of Nigeria contains the largest number of minority ethnic groups in Nigeria, who were found to be majority Christians and members of traditional religions, with a significant Muslim minority.

=== Health ===
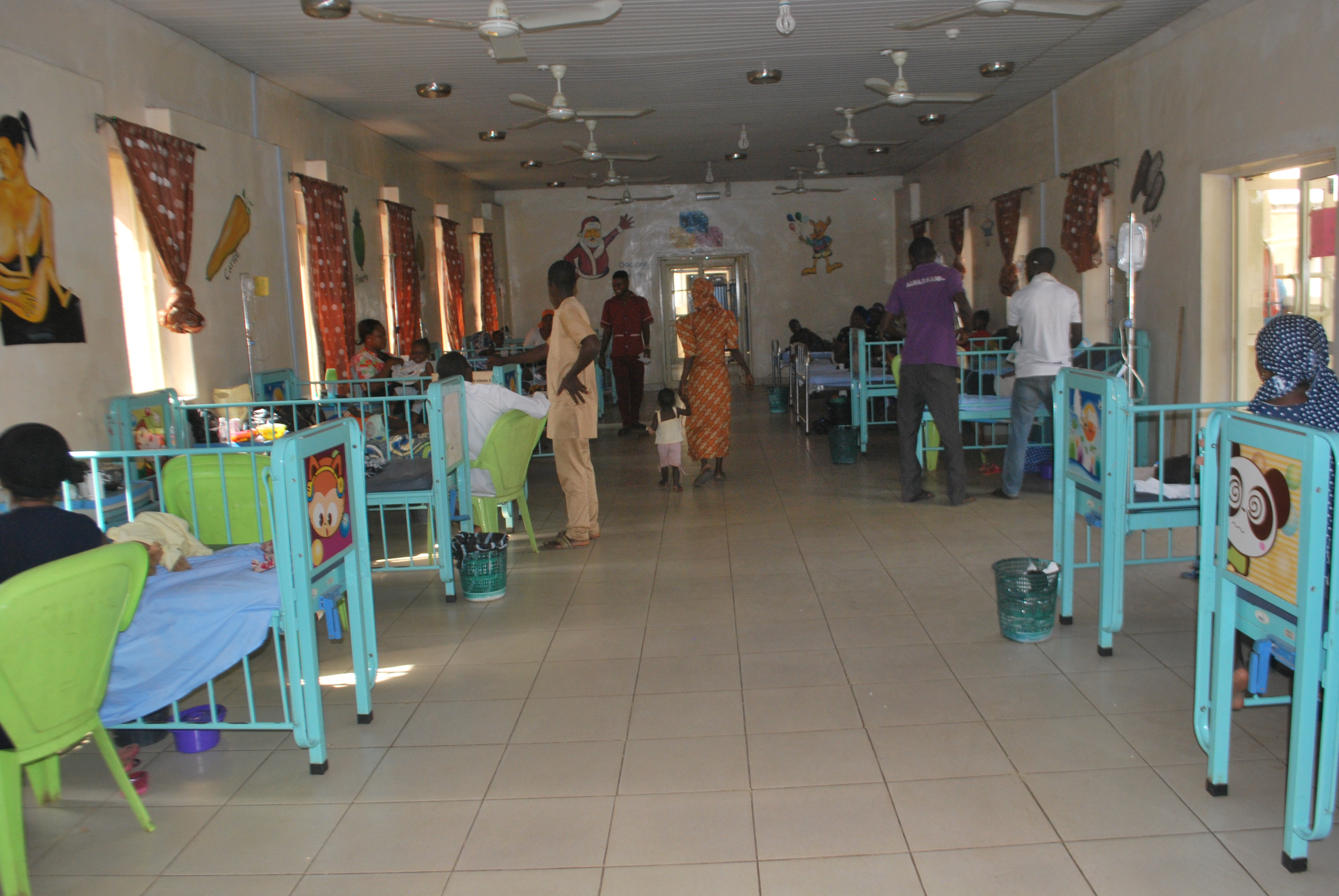
Paediatric ward, General hospital, Ilorin

Health care delivery in Nigeria is a concurrent responsibility of the three tiers of government in the country, and the private sector. Nigeria has been reorganising its health system since the Bamako Initiative of 1987, which formally promoted community-based methods of increasing accessibility of drugs and health care services to the population, in part by implementing user fees. The new strategy dramatically increased accessibility through community-based health care reform, resulting in more efficient and equitable provision of services. A comprehensive approach strategy was extended to all areas of health care, with subsequent improvement in the health care indicators and improvement in health care efficiency and cost.

Almost half of Nigerians, or 48%, report that they or a household member has fallen ill in the last three months. Malaria had been diagnosed in 88% of the cases and typhoid fever in 32%. High blood pressure was in third place with 8%. For symptoms of malaria, 41% of Nigerians turn to a hospital, 22% to a chemist's shop, 21% to a pharmacy and 11% seek cure through herbs. Tuberculosis (TB) is a significant public health issue in Nigeria, ranking among the top countries with high TB burdens globally.

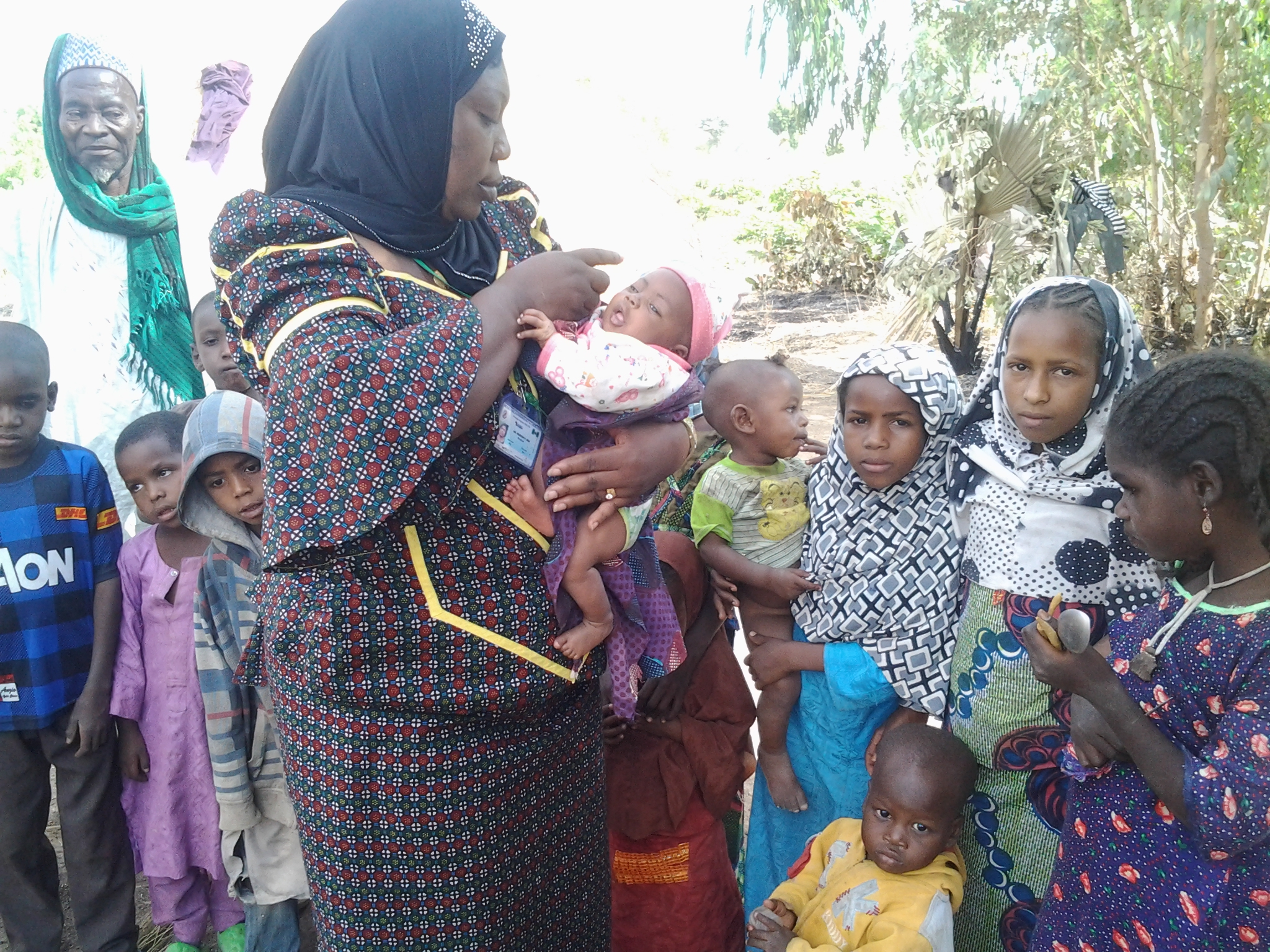
Polio vaccination in Adamawa State, northeastern Nigeria, 2014

The HIV/AIDS rate in Nigeria is much lower than in other African nations such as Botswana or South Africa whose prevalence (percentage) rates are in the double digits. As of 2019, the HIV prevalence rate among adults of ages 15–49 was 1.5 per cent. Life expectancy in Nigeria is 54.7 years on average, and 71% and 39% of the population have access to improved water sources and improved sanitation, respectively. As of 2019, the infant mortality is 74.2 deaths per 1,000 live births.

In 2012, a new bone marrow donor program was launched by the University of Nigeria to help people with leukaemia, lymphoma, or sickle cell disease to find a compatible donor for a life-saving bone marrow transplant, which cures them of their conditions. Nigeria became the second African country to have successfully carried out this surgery. In the 2014 Ebola outbreak, Nigeria was the first country to effectively contain and eliminate the Ebola threat that was ravaging three other countries in the West African region; the unique method of contact tracing employed by Nigeria became an effective method later used by countries such as the United States when Ebola threats were discovered.

The Nigerian health care system is continuously faced with a shortage of doctors known as "brain drain", because of emigration by skilled Nigerian doctors to North America and Europe. In 1995, an estimated 21,000 Nigerian doctors were practising in the United States alone, which is about the same as the number of doctors working in the Nigerian public service. Retaining these expensively trained professionals has been identified as one of the goals of the government.

=== Education ===
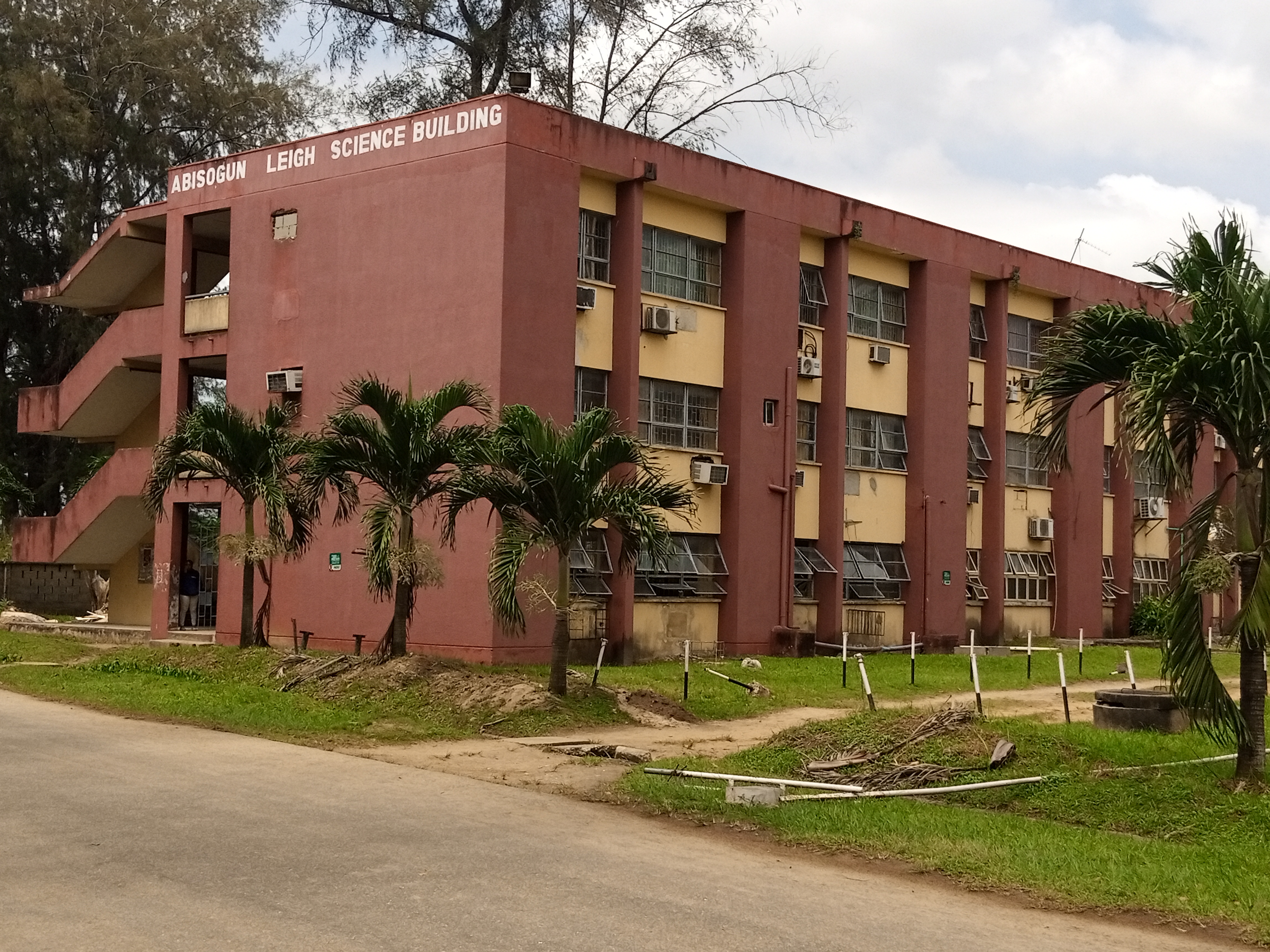
Abisogun Leigh Science Building, for the Lagos State University's Faculty of Science

Education in Nigeria is overseen by the Ministry of Education. Local authorities take responsibility for implementing policy for state-controlled public education and state schools at a regional level. The education system is divided into kindergarten, primary education, secondary education and tertiary education. After the 1970s oil boom, tertiary education was improved so it would reach every subregion of Nigeria. 68% of the Nigerian population is literate, and the rate for men (75.7%) is higher than that for women (60.6%).

Nigeria provides free, government-supported education, but attendance is not compulsory at any level, and certain groups, such as nomads and the handicapped, are under-served. Nearly 10.5 million Nigerian children aged 5–14 years are not in school. Only 61% of 6–11 year-olds regularly attend primary school. The education system consists of six years of primary school, three years of junior secondary school, three years of senior secondary school, and four, five or six years of university education leading to a bachelor's degree. The government has majority control of university education. Tertiary education in Nigeria consists of universities (public and private), polytechnics, monotechnics, and colleges of education. The country has a total of 138 universities, with 40 federally owned, 39 state-owned, and 59 privately owned. Nigeria was ranked 105th in the Global Innovation Index in 2025.

=== Crime ===
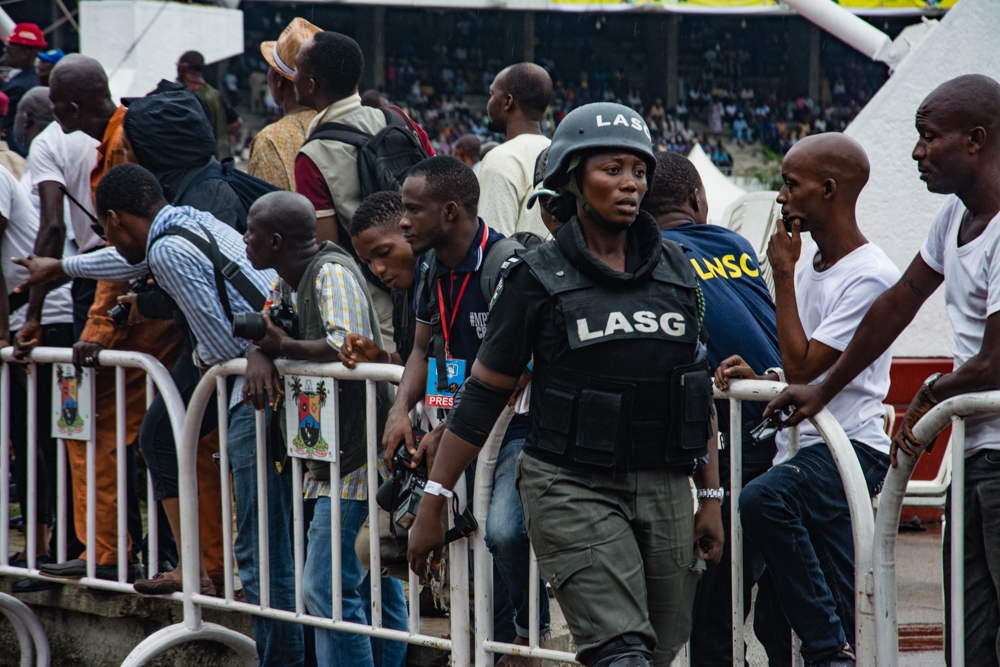
A Nigerian police officer at the Eyo festival in Lagos

The security situation in Nigeria is considered inadequate despite political stability. 68% of Nigerians feel "not safe" in their country. 77% do not know of an alarm number ("helpline") for emergencies. Nigerians, according to the above survey, fear being robbed (24%) or kidnapped (also 24%), being victims of armed bandits or of petty theft (both 8%), or being harmed in the herdsmen-farmers conflict (also 8%). This is followed by "ritual killings" (4%) and "Boko Haram" (3.5%). Respondents see "more security personnel and better training" (37%), "reduction of unemployment" (13%) and "prayers / divine intervention" (8%) as promising countermeasures.

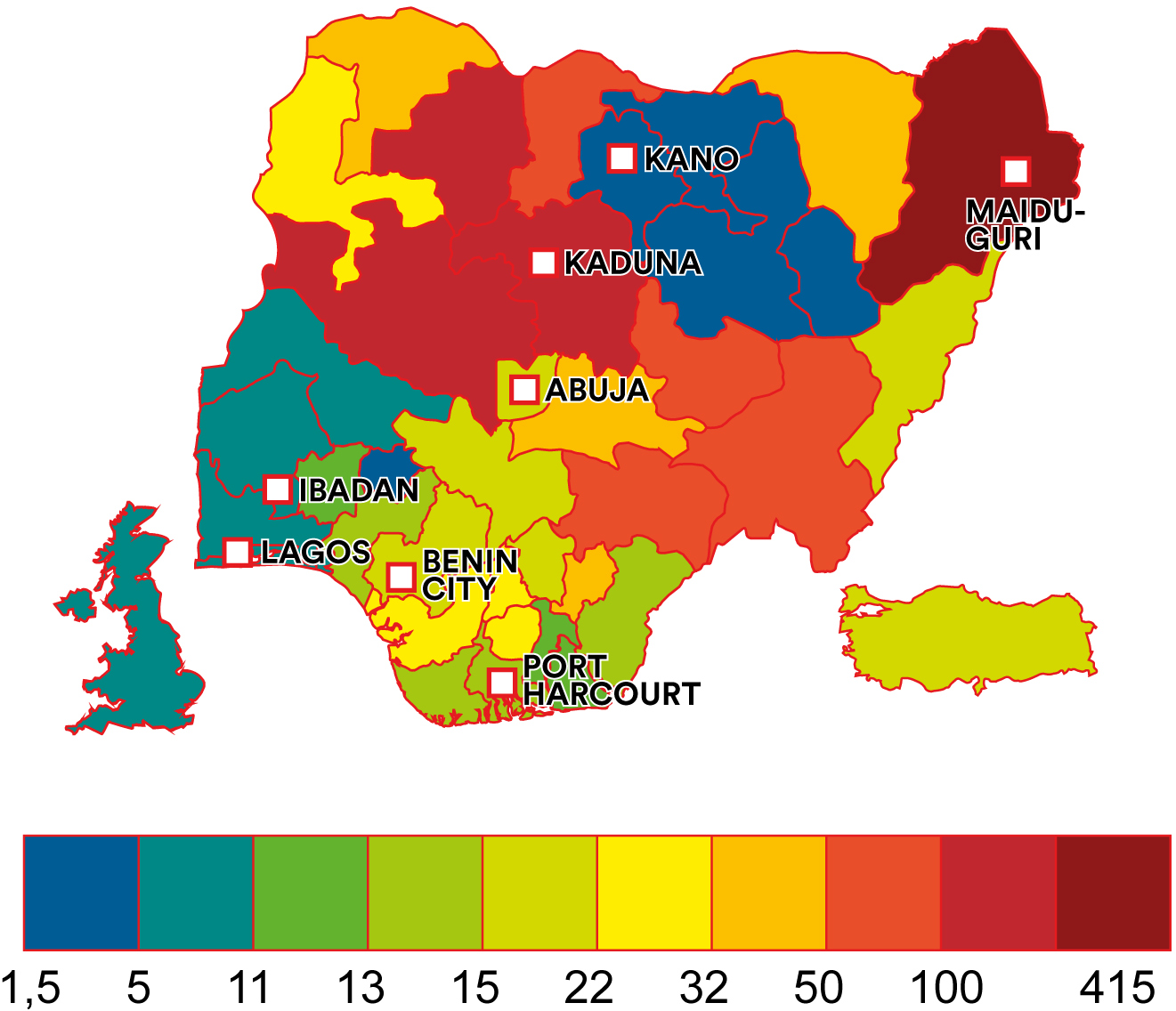
Homicides by Nigerian state per year and per 1 million inhabitants, comparing the UK and Turkey (source: Nigeria Security Tracker 1/2020-6/2023)

Spatial data from 2006 to 2021 indicates that Borno State recorded the highest absolute and per-capita violent mortality rate in Nigeria, followed by heavily impacted states such as Lagos State, Kaduna State, and Zamfara State. In contrast, states such as Jigawa State, Ekiti State, Kano State, and Sokoto State maintained the lowest relative rates of violence-related fatalities per 100,000 inhabitants. Insurgencies, communal disputes, and criminal networks increasingly concentrate in vulnerable rural areas. These conflicts are fueled by underlying drivers such as resource scarcity, climate change, weak state governance, ethnic tensions, and high youth unemployment, while being further aggravated by armed groups and conflict entrepreneurs engaging in illicit enterprises like kidnapping for ransom, extortion, illegal mining, and arms trafficking.

There is some piracy in the Gulf of Guinea, with attacks directed at all types of vessels. However, security measures on board of mentioned vessels have recently meant that pirates are now more likely to attack fishing villages.

Internationally, Nigeria is infamous for a type of advance-fee scam along with a form of confidence trick. The victim is talked into sending money or bank account information to the scammer on the premise that a larger amount of money will be transferred to them. In reality, the scammer collects money from the victim with no payout occurring. In 2003, the Nigerian Economic and Financial Crimes Commission was created to combat this and other forms of organised financial crime. The EFCC is quite active.

=== Poverty ===
The total expenditure of food and non-food produce a poverty incidence of 60.2 percent or 89,096,000 Nigerians living in poverty. This measure is used for poverty headcount comparison across countries. Poverty Line is N54,401.16.

According to the International Monetary Fund, 32% of Nigeria's population lives in extreme poverty (as of 2017), living on less than US$2.15 a day. The World Bank stated in March 2022 that the number of poor Nigerians had increased by 5 million to 95.1 million during the Covid period. Accordingly, 40% of Nigerians live below the poverty line of US$1.90 as handled by the World Bank.

The poverty rate may be overestimated due to a lack of information on the extremely huge informal sector of the economy. Despite the undoubted existence of slums in Nigeria, for example, the fact that 92% of men and 88% of women in Nigeria own a mobile phone is difficult to reconcile with the poverty percentages published by the IMF and the World Bank.

=== Human rights ===
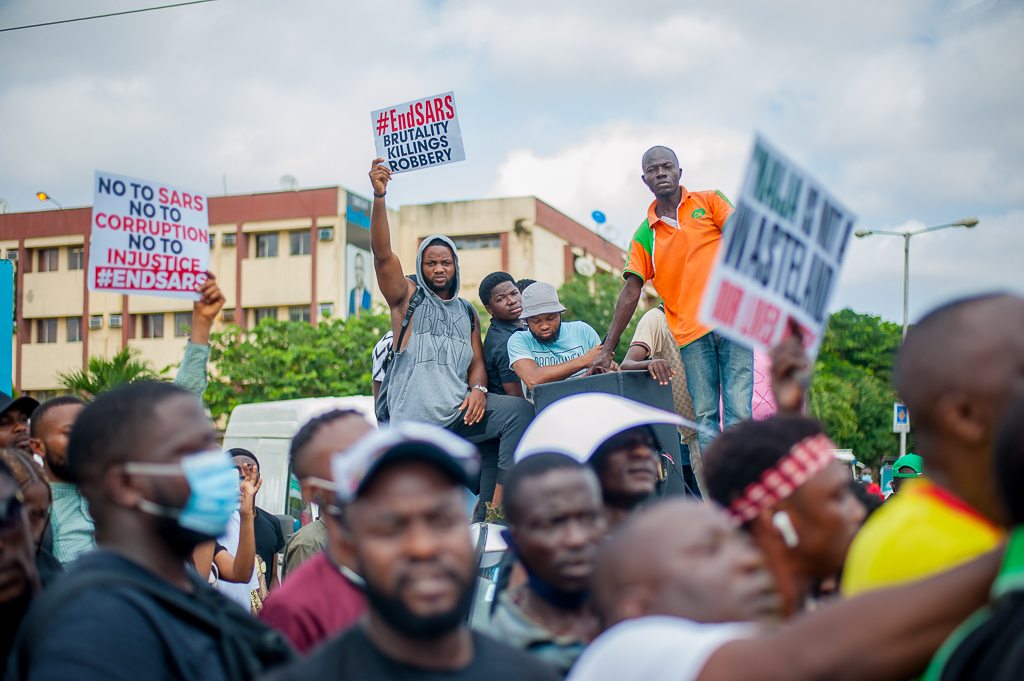
End SARS is a decentralised social movement and series of mass protests against police brutality in Nigeria.

Nigeria's human rights record remains poor. According to the U.S. Department of State, the most significant human rights problems are the use of excessive force by security forces, impunity for abuses by security forces, arbitrary arrests, prolonged pretrial detention, judicial corruption and executive influence on the judiciary, rape, torture and other cruel, inhuman or degrading treatment of prisoners, detainees and suspects; harsh and life‑threatening prison and detention centre conditions; human trafficking for prostitution and forced labour, societal violence and vigilante killings, child labour, child abuse and child sexual exploitation, domestic violence, discrimination based on ethnicity, region and religion.

Nigeria is a state party of the Convention on the Elimination of All Forms of Discrimination Against Women. It also has signed the Maputo Protocol, an international treaty on women's rights, and the African Union Women's Rights Framework. Discrimination based on sex is a significant human rights issue. Forced marriages are common. Child marriage remains common in Northern Nigeria; 39% of girls are married before age 15, although the Marriage Rights Act banning marriage of girls under 18 was introduced on a federal level in 2008. There is rampant polygamy in Northern Nigeria. Domestic violence is common. Women have fewer land rights. Maternal mortality was at 814 per 100,000 live births in 2015. Female genital mutilation is common, although a ban was implemented in 2015. At least half a million suffer from vaginal fistula, largely as a result of lack of medical care.

Women face a large amount of inequality politically in Nigeria, being subjugated to a bias that is sexist and reinforced by socio-cultural, economic and oppressive ways. Women throughout the country were only politically emancipated in 1979. Yet husbands continue to dictate the votes for many women, which upholds the patriarchal system. Most workers in the informal sector are women. Women's representation in government since independence from Britain is very poor. Women have been reduced to sideline roles in appointive posts throughout all levels of government and still make up a tiny minority of elected officials. But nowadays with more education available to the public, Nigerian women are taking steps to have more active roles in the public, and with the help of different initiatives, more businesses are being started by women.

Under the Shari'a penal code that applies to Muslims in twelve northern states, offences such as alcohol consumption, homosexuality, infidelity and theft carry harsh sentences, including amputation, lashing, stoning and long prison terms. The local religious police, the Hisbah, enforce Sharia law. Despite this potentially orthodox stance, no one has been executed in Nigeria on the orders of an Islamic Sharia court since 2002.

Nigeria is considered to be one of the most homophobic countries in the world. Nigeria’s anti-LGBT laws are among the most draconian in the world and criminalise not only queer people, but also their ‘supporters’, such as family members and close friends. These laws enjoy the support of a large majority of the population. In a 2018 poll, 96 per cent of Nigerians said they were opposed to same-sex relationships (although 75 per cent of them were not aware of any such relationships within their personal circle).

== Culture ==
=== Architecture ===
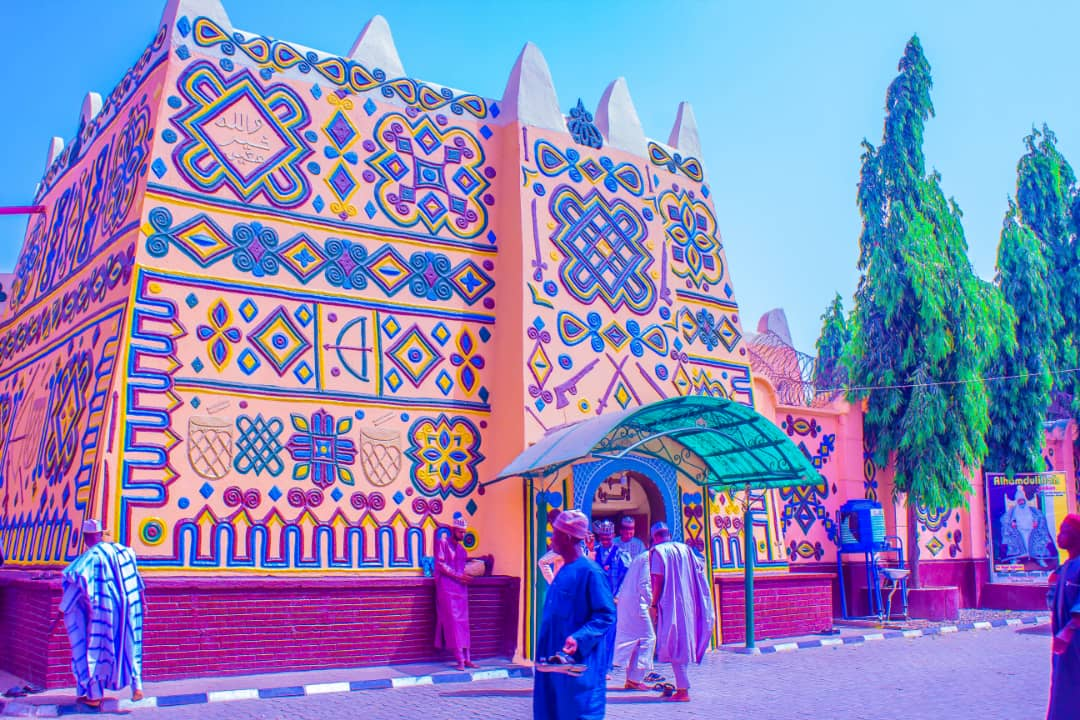
The palace of the Bauchi Emirate.

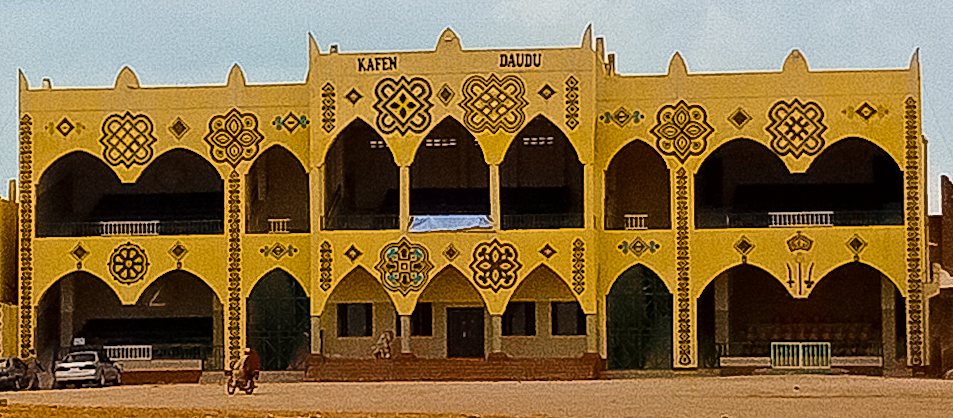
One of the main entrance of the Zaria Palace, Hausa architecture.

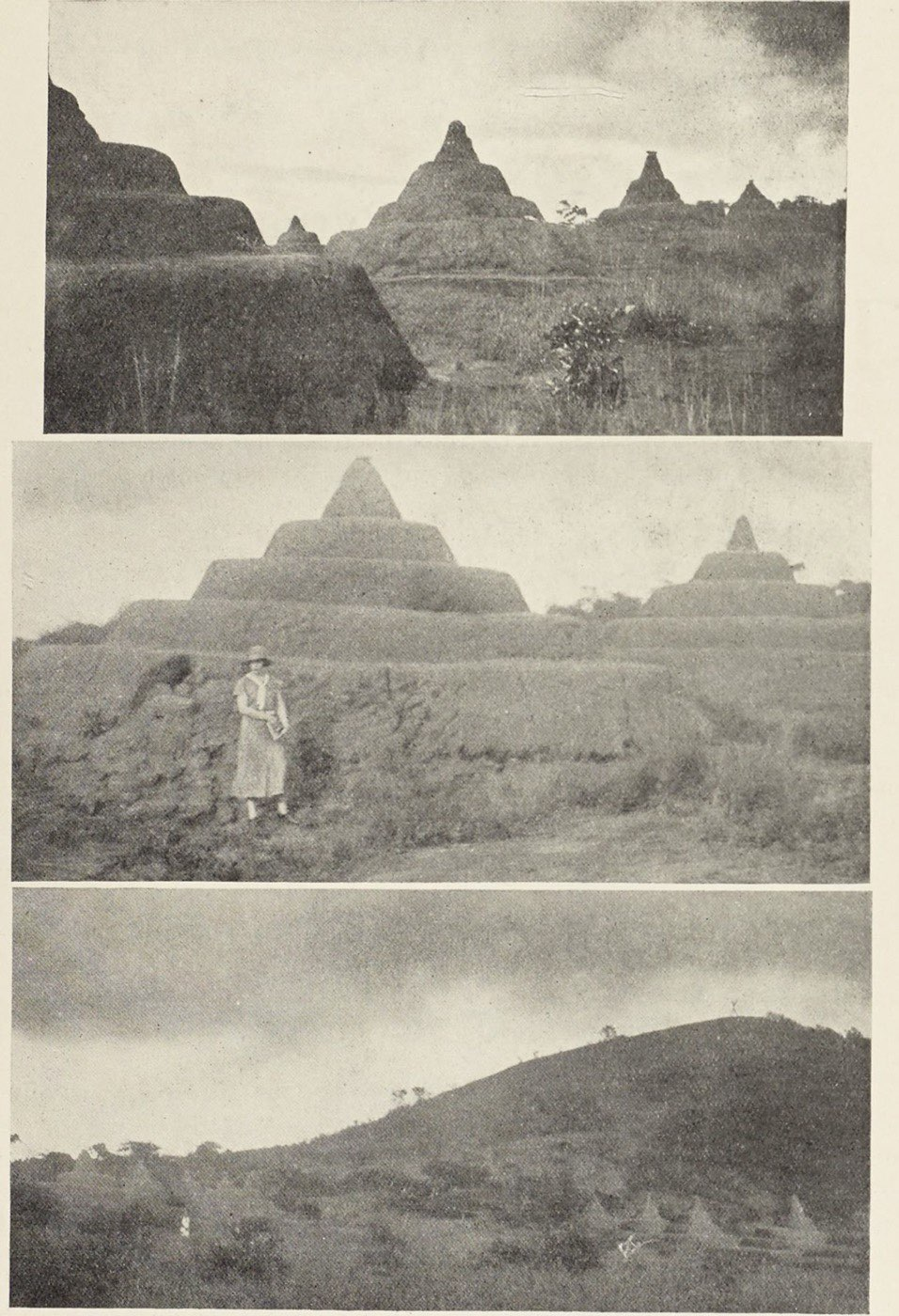
The Nsude pyramids, a remarkable example of Igbo architecture, taken in 1935.

Prior to European colonization, indigenous architectural styles across Nigeria adapted local climate conditions, available resources, and social structures through the use of sun-dried mud bricks (tubali), timber framing, and thatched roofing. In northern regions, traditional Hausa architecture was integrated into extensive walled urban centers accessed via fortified gatehouses. These residential compounds contained specialized functional areas, including individual sleeping quarters (daki), dedicated kitchens (darki girki), open shaded shelters (rumfa), quarters for unmarried adult males (shago), central water wells (rijiya), and decorative roof parapet projections (zanko). Following the spread of Islam, spatial layouts were modified to include male reception areas (azure) to enforce gender segregation and maintain privacy from external visitors.

In southeastern Nigeria, pre-colonial Igbo architecture featured round mud-walled dwellings (ulo aja oto) with pitched thatched roofs (aju or atani) constructed over woven bamboo frameworks and supported by timber beams. Directed by a titled family elder (okpara), the single-entrance compound functioned as a cohesive social unit centered around a symbolic meeting hall (obi), ancestral shrines (okwu-alusi), and individual residential spaces (ime ulo). Similarly, traditional Yoruba architecture was characterized by expansive extended-family compounds (agbo'le), named after the compound head and constructed through communal labor. These structures utilized thick mud walls finished with sand plaster, termite-resistant timber rafters, and large central courtyards (orowa) that accommodated shared domestic activities, livestock, and storage.

=== Literature ===
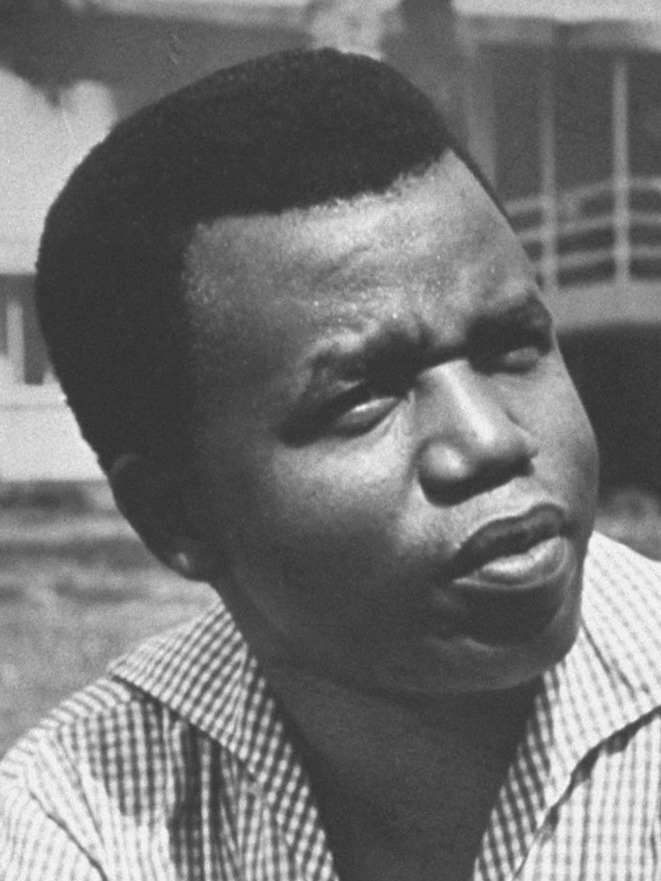
Chinua Achebe, winner Booker Prize 2007 and Peace Award of the German book trade 2002

Most Nigerian literature is written in English, partly because this language is understood by most Nigerians. Literature in the Yoruba, Hausa and Igbo languages (the three most populous language groups in Nigeria) does exist, however, and in the case of the Hausa, for example, can look back on a centuries-old tradition. Wole Soyinka won the Nobel Prize for literature in 1986. Ben Okri won the prestigious Booker Prize in 1991; Chinua Achebe did the same in 2007. Achebe also won the Peace Award of the German Book Trade in 2002. Lola Shoneyin has won several awards for her book The Secret Lives of Baba Segi's Wives.

=== Music ===
The earliest known form of popular music in Nigeria was the palm-wine music which dominated the music landscape in the 1920s. Tunde King was a prominent name in the genre.

The 1930s saw the emergence of Onitsha Native Orchestra. They explored various social themes and trends in their native singing style.

In the 1950s and 1960s, Highlife music became a popular staple in the country with regional genres such as the Igbo Highlife. A notable exponent of the genre were the genre's first Nigerian boy band Oriental Brothers International, Bobby Benson, Osita Osadebe, Victor Olaiya, Rex Lawson, Dr Sir Warrior and Oliver De Coque.

The 1970s was the era of Fela Kuti, the pioneer of Afrobeat genre – fused from Highlife, Jazz and Yoruba Music. Fela later evolved into social activism and black consciousness.

In the 1980s, King Sunny Ade achieved success with Juju Music. Another prominent singer of the era is William Onyeabor, who is known for his fusion of Funk Music and Disco.

By the 1990s, reggae music transitioned into the music scene. Prominent reggae artiste of the era was Majek Fashek. By the mid-1990s, hip-hop began to gain popularity, led by acts such as Remedies, Trybes Men, JJC, etc. Throughout the years, highlife music retained its popularity in the country.

At the turn of the century, famous 2000s acts like P-Square, 2face, and Dbanj were credited to have made tremendous impact in the evolution of Afrobeats and its popularisation on the international stage.

In November 2008, Nigeria's music scene (and that of Africa) received international attention when MTV hosted the continent's first African music awards show in Abuja. Over a decade later, the Afrobeat genre has widely taken over, with artist like Davido, Wizkid and Burna Boy.

=== Cinema ===
Top five highest grossing Nigerian films as at 2024:

- Everybody Loves Jenifa (₦1.7 billion) - 2024 film
- A Tribe Called Judah (₦1.4 billion) - 2023 film
- Battle on Buka Street (₦668 million) - 2022 film
- Omo Ghetto: The Saga (₦636 million) - 2020 film
- Alakada: Bad and Boujee (₦460 million) - 2024 film

The Nigerian film industry is known as Nollywood (a blend of "Nigeria" and "Hollywood") and is now the second-largest producer of movies in the world, having surpassed Hollywood. Only India's Bollywood is larger. Nigerian film studios are based in Lagos, Kano, and Enugu, and form a major portion of the local economy of these cities. Nigerian cinema is Africa's largest movie industry in terms of both value and the number of movies produced per year. Although Nigerian films have been produced since the 1960s, the country's film industry has been aided by the rise of affordable digital filming and editing technologies. The 2009 thriller film The Figurine heightened the media attention towards the New Nigerian Cinema revolution. The film was a critical and commercial success in Nigeria, and it was also screened in international film festivals. The 2010 film Ijé by Chineze Anyaene, overtook The Figurine to become the highest-grossing Nigerian film; a record it held for four years until it was overtaken in 2014 by Half of a Yellow Sun (2013). By 2016, this record was held by The Wedding Party by Kemi Adetiba. ‘My Father’s Shadow’ by Akinola Davies Jr. won awards at Cannes and the BAFTAs in 2025.

By the end of 2013, the film industry reportedly hit a record-breaking revenue of ₦1.72 trillion (US$4.1 billion). As of 2014, the industry was worth ₦853.9 billion (US$5.1 billion), making it the third most valuable film industry in the world behind the United States and India. It contributed about 1.4% to Nigeria's economy; this was attributed to the increase in the number of quality films produced and more formal distribution methods.

T.B. Joshua's Emmanuel TV, originating from Nigeria, is one of the most viewed television stations across Africa.

=== Festival ===
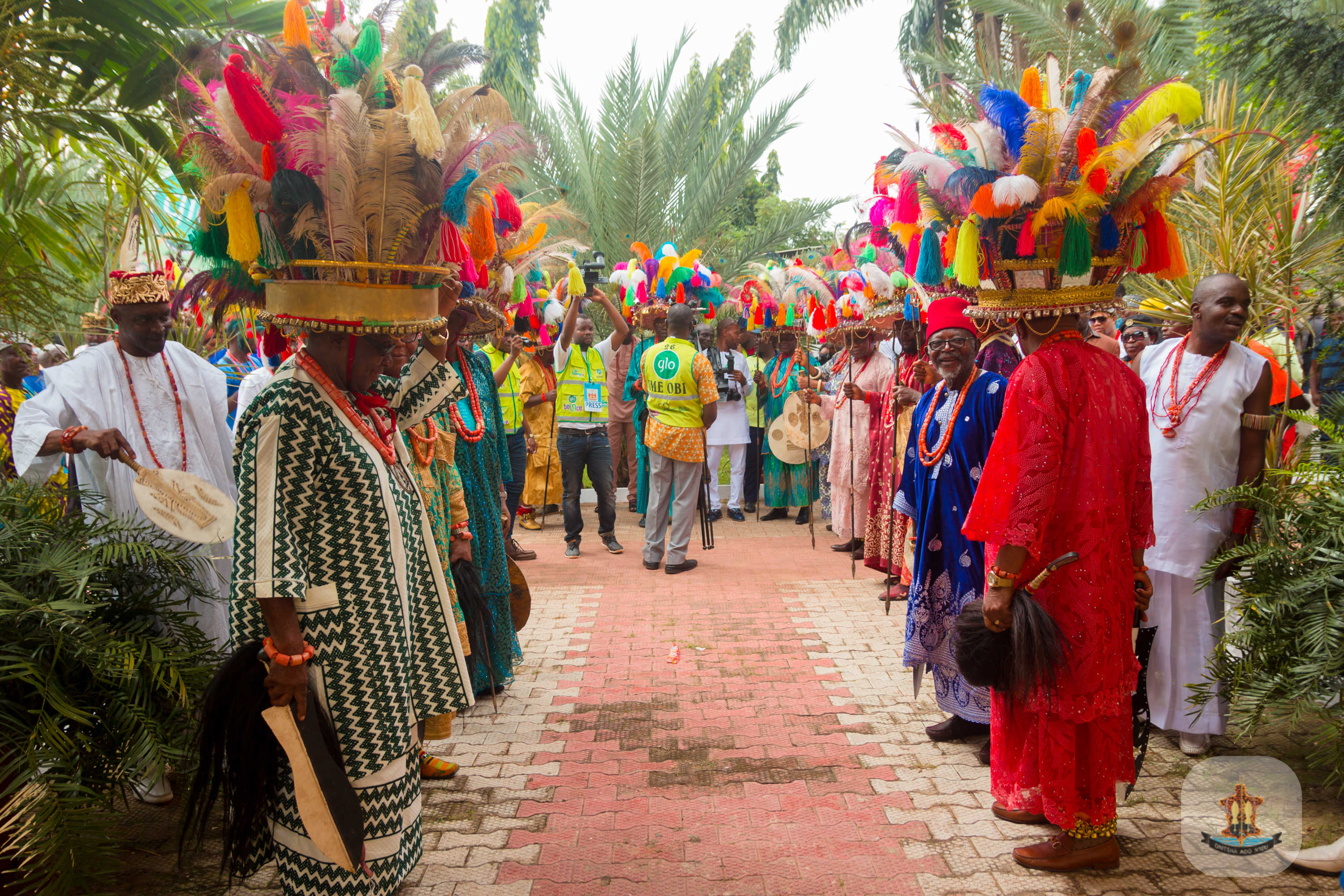
Ofala Festival of Onitsha People

There are many festivals in Nigeria, some of which date to the period before the arrival of the major religions in this ethnically and culturally diverse society. The main Muslim and Christian festivals are often celebrated in ways that are unique to Nigeria or unique to the people of a locality. The Nigerian Tourism Development Corporation has been working with the states to upgrade the traditional festivals, which may become important sources of tourism revenue.

=== Cuisine ===
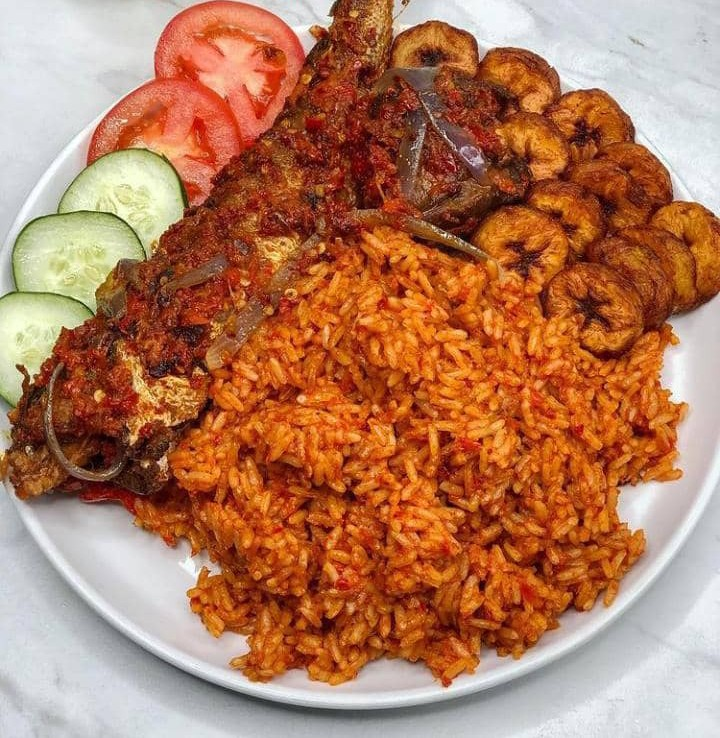
Jollof rice with fried fish and plantain, garnished with cucumber and tomatoes

Nigerian cuisine, like West African cuisine in general, is known for its richness and variety. Many different spices, herbs, and flavourings are used in conjunction with palm oil or groundnut oil to create deeply flavoured sauces and soups often made very hot with chilli peppers. Nigerian feasts are colourful and lavish, while aromatic market and roadside snacks cooked on barbecues or fried in oil are plentiful and varied. Suya is usually sold in urban areas especially during night-time.

=== Fashion ===
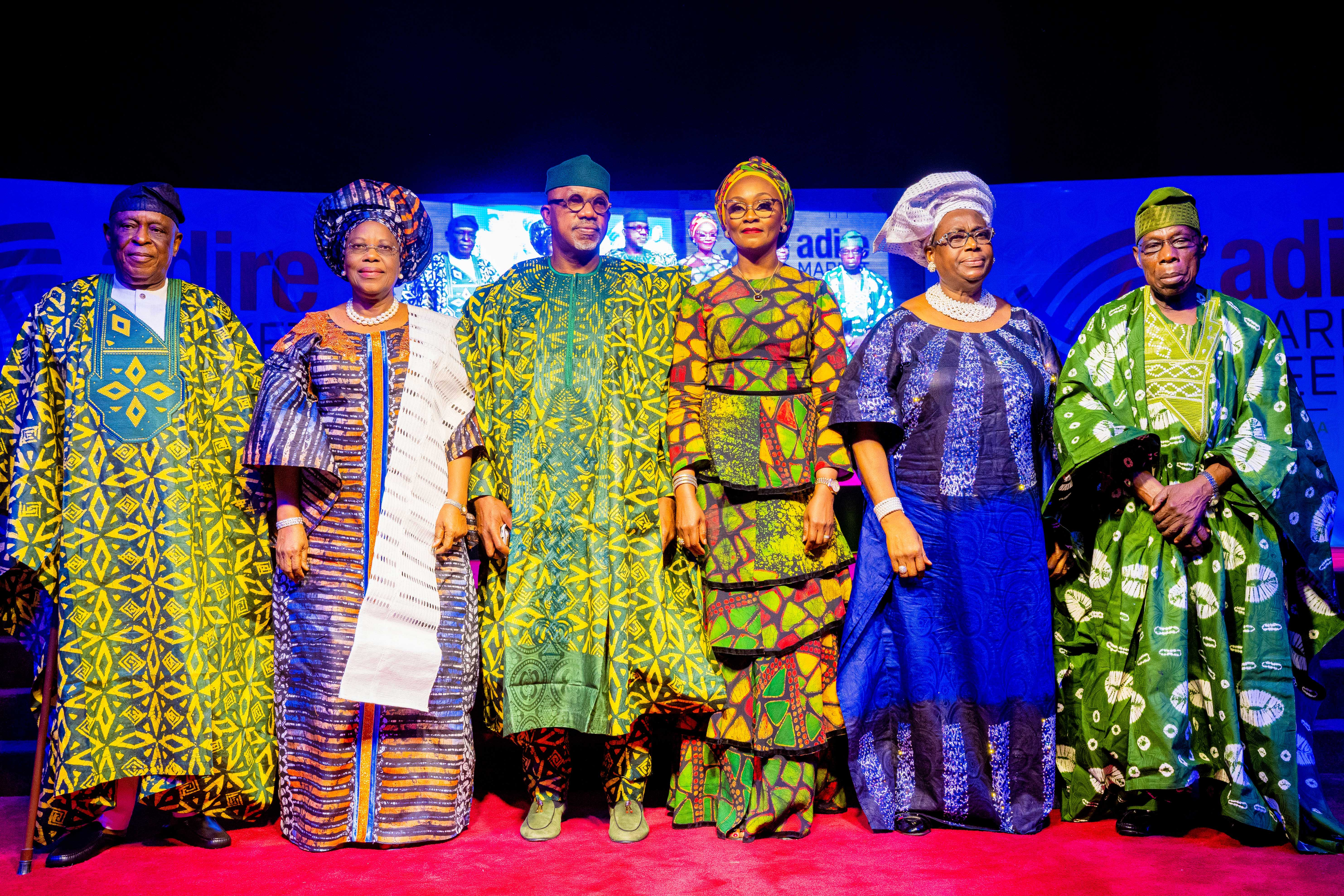
Àdìrẹ

The fashion industry in Nigeria contributes significantly to the country's economics. Casual attire is commonly worn but formal and traditional styles are also worn depending on the occasion. Nigeria is known not only for its fashionable textiles and garments, but also for its fashion designers who have increasingly gained international recognition. Euromonitor estimates the Sub-Saharan fashion market to be worth $31 billion, with Nigeria accounting for 15% of these $31 billion. Nigeria is not only known for their many fashion textiles and garment pieces that are secret to their culture. They also produced many fashion designers who have developed many techniques and businesses along the way.

=== Sports ===
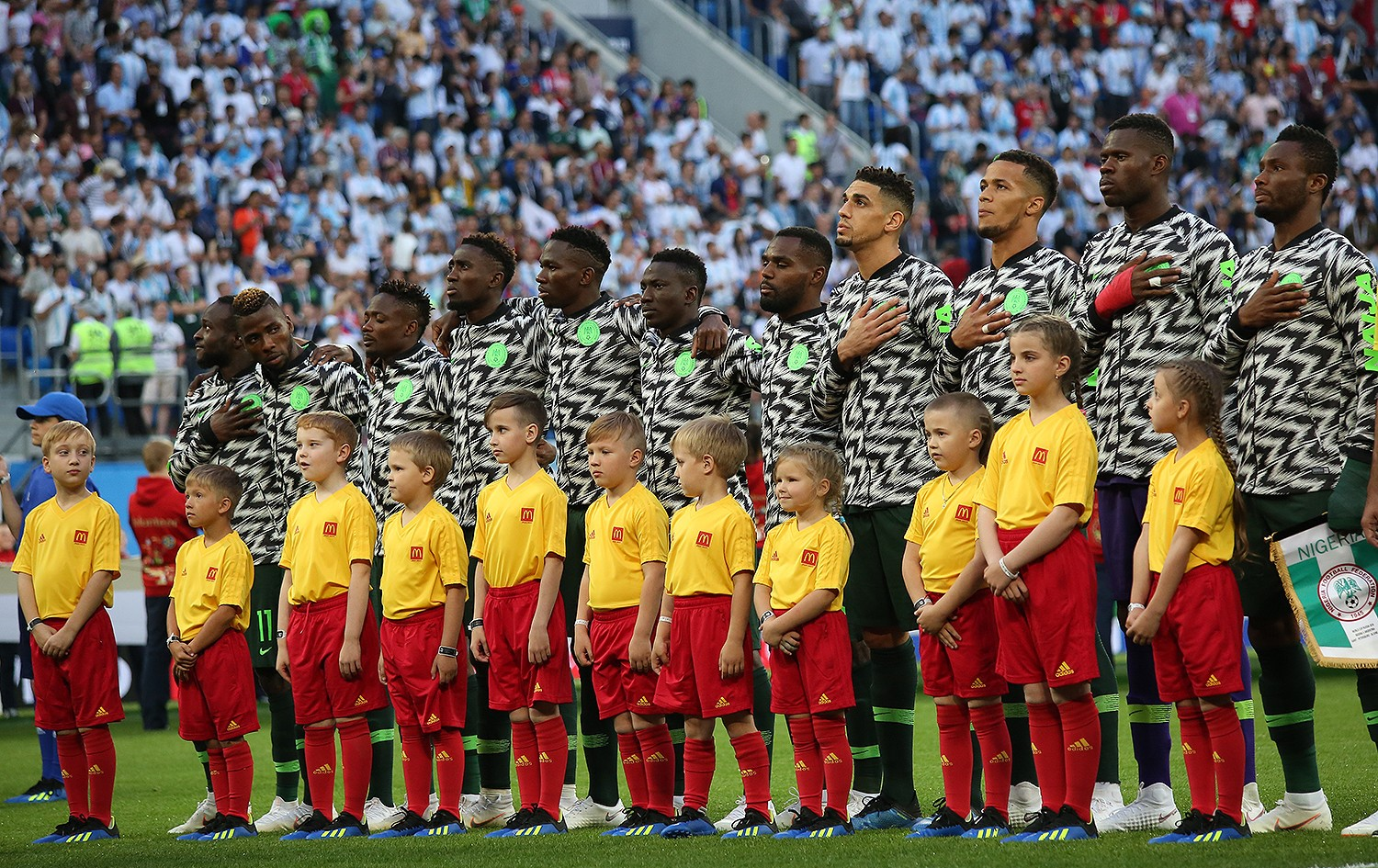
Nigeria at the 2018 FIFA World Cup

Football is largely considered Nigeria's national sport, and the country has its own professional football league. Nigeria's national football team, known as the "Super Eagles", has played in the FIFA World Cup on six occasions (1994, 1998, 2002, 2010, 2014, and 2018). In April 1994, the Super Eagles ranked fifth in the FIFA World Rankings, the highest ranking achieved by an African team. They won the Africa Cup of Nations in 1980, 1994, and 2013, and have also hosted both the U17 and U20 FIFA World Cup. They won the gold medal for football in the 1996 Summer Olympics (in which they beat Argentina) becoming the first African football team to win gold in Olympic football.

Nigeria is also involved in other sports such as basketball, cricket and track and field. Nigeria's national basketball team made the headlines internationally when it became the first African team to beat the United States men's national team. In earlier years, Nigeria qualified for the 2012 Summer Olympics as it beat heavily favoured world elite teams such as Greece and Lithuania. Nigeria has been home to numerous internationally recognised basketball players in the world's top leagues in America, Europe and Asia. These players include Basketball Hall of Famer Hakeem Olajuwon, and later players in the NBA. The Nigerian Premier League has become one of the biggest and most-watched basketball competitions in Africa. The games have aired on Kwese TV and have averaged a viewership of over a million people.

Nigeria made history by qualifying the first bobsled team for the Winter Olympics from Africa when their women's two-person team qualified for the bobsled competition at the XXIII Olympic Winter Games. In the early 1990s, Scrabble was made an official sport in Nigeria; by the end of 2017, there were around 4,000 players in more than 100 clubs in the country. In 2018, the Nigerian Curling Federation was established to introduce a new sport to the country in order to make the game part of the curriculum at the elementary, high school, and university levels. At the 2019 World Mixed Doubles Curling Championship in Norway, Nigeria won their first international match beating France 8–5.

Nigeria's women's and men's national teams in beach volleyball competed at the 2018–2020 CAVB Beach Volleyball Continental Cup. The country's U21 national teams qualified for the 2019 FIVB Beach Volleyball U21 World Championships.

Nigeria is the birthplace of the sport loofball.

== See also ==
- Outline of Nigeria
