= List of works by Wole Soyinka =

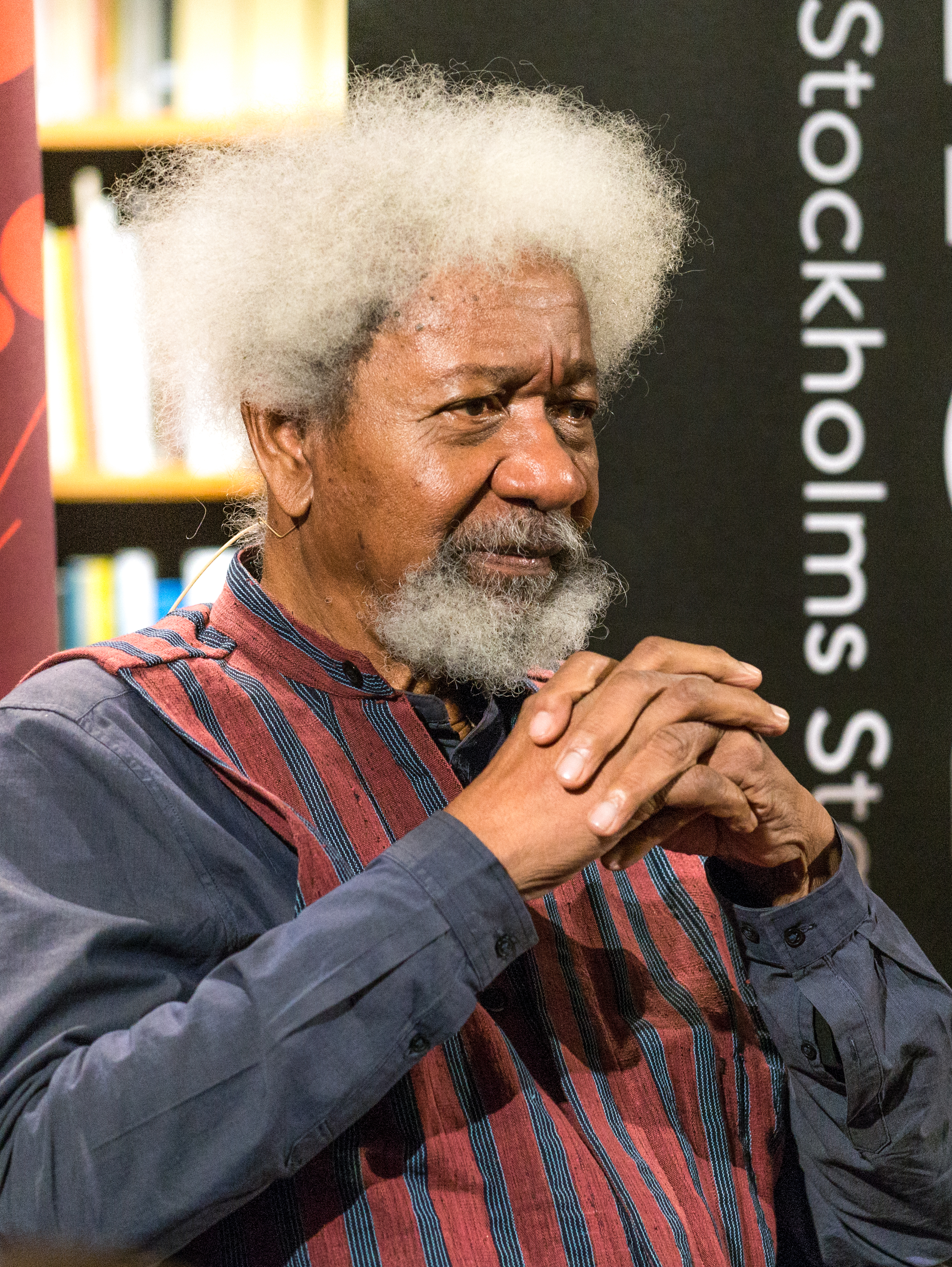
Soyinka in 2018

The works of the Nigerian author Wole Soyinka comprise 25 plays, ten essay collections, seven poetry collections, five memoirs, three novels, and two translated works. His first major plays were The Swamp Dwellers (1958) and The Lion and the Jewel (1959), both of which were performed in Ibadan, Nigeria. Soyinka's unpublished play The Invention (1957) was his first work to be produced at the Royal Court Theatre in 1959, where he worked as a play reader. His play A Dance of the Forests was written and first performed in 1960 as part of the national celebrations of the independence of Nigeria.

After Chukwuemeka Odumegwu Ojukwu declared the independence of Biafra in 1966, Soyinka was arrested and accused of taking sides following his attempt to negotiate between the Nigerian government and the Biafra separatists. When the Nigerian Civil War ended, he was released in 1969 under amnesty. Madmen and Specialists (1970) was his first play after his release. His arrest and prison experiences were detailed in his first memoir, The Man Died: Prison Notes of Wole Soyinka (1972), which along Poems from Prison was written and smuggled out during his imprisonment. Soyinka has written three novels: The Interpreters (1965); Season of Anomy (1973), and Chronicles from the Land of the Happiest People on Earth (2021). From 1960 to 1964, he was co-editor of Black Orpheus, and he later edited the literary magazine Transition and anthologies including Poems of Black Africa (1975). He has written two autobiographies: Aké: The Years of Childhood and You Must Set Forth at Dawn. A notable poet, he has written seven poetry collections, including Idanre and Other Poems and A Shuttle in the Crypt.

Soyinka's works often depicts Greek and Yoruba mythology, Christian ideology, Yoruba language and rituals. His influence extends to film and theatre. His plays Death and the King's Horseman and The Man Died have been adapted for stage and screen. He has received many accolades for his works, including the 1986 Nobel Prize in Literature, Benson Medal, the Commonwealth Poetry Prize, and an extended list of honours and awards. In August 2014, he delivered a speech entitled "From Chibok with Love" to the World Humanist Congress in Oxford and was awarded the 2014 International Humanist Award.

== Literature ==
=== Published plays ===
- Three Short Plays: "The Swamp Dwellers", "The Trials of Brother Jero", "The Strong Breed" (1963). Ibadan, Nigeria: Mbari Publications. OCLC 158189
- A Dance of the Forests (1963). London and New York: Oxford University Press/Three Crowns Books. ISBN 9780199110827
- The Lion and the Jewel (1963); London and New York: Oxford University Press/Three Crowns Books. ISBN 9780199110834
- The Road (1965); London and New York: Oxford University Press/Three Crowns Books. ISBN 978-0199110841
- Kongi's Harvest (1967); London: Oxford University Press. OCLC 460416584
- Madmen and Specialists (1971); London: Eyre Methuen. ISBN 9780416187601; 1972: New York: Hill and Wang. ISBN 9780809067084
- The Bacchae of Euripides: A Communion Rite (1973); London: Eyre Methuen. ISBN 9780413300201
- The Jero Plays (1972); London: Eyre Methuen. ISBN 9780413292308 (Jero's Metamorphosis (1973). London: Eyre Methuen)
- Collected Plays, Volume I (1973). London and New York: Oxford University Press. ISBN 9780192811363 OCLC 889204010 (The Strong Breed (1973). ISBN 9780192811363 OCLC 934841733)
- Collected Plays, Volume II (1974). London: Oxford University Press. ISBN 9780192811646
- Death and the King's Horseman (1975). London: Eyre Methuen. ISBN 9780413333506

=== Other stage plays, revues, radio and TV plays ===
Source: Unpublished plays are marked with a cross sign: +

- The Invention (1957). Royal Court Theatre, London. ^{+}
- The House of Banigeji, Act 2 in Reflections by F. Ademola (1962). Lagos: African Universities Press.
- The Republican (1964)
- Before the Blackout (1965). Ibadan, Nigeria: Orisun Editions.
- My Father's Burden (6 August 1960). Western Nigerian TV.
- The Tortoise (18 December 1960). Nigerian Radio Times.
- Camwood on the Leaves (1973). London: Eyre Methuen.
- The Detainee (5 September 1965). BBC African Service.

=== Novels ===
- The Interpreters (1965); London: Andre Deutsch. ISBN 9780233989785 OCLC 1842667 London: Heinemann: African Writers Series (1970). ISBN 9780435900762 OCLC 156254; 1972: New York: Holmes and Meier.
- Season of Anomy (1973); London: Rex Collings. ISBN 9780901720504 OCLC 1094379
- Chronicles from the Land of the Happiest People on Earth (2021); Nigeria: BookCraft. ISBN 9780593314470; New York: Pantheon Books. ISBN 9780593320167 OCLC 1238132759 2021: London: Bloomsbury Circus. ISBN 9781526638243 OCLC 1228321674 2023: Paris: Éditions du Seuil. ISBN 9782021497885 OCLC 1397836911; La nave di Teseo, Italy. ISBN 9788834611784

=== Short stories ===
Source: Unpublished stories are marked with a cross sign: +

- Keffi's Birthday Treat (1954). Nigerian Radio Times: Lagos, Nigeria.
- A Tale of Two Cities (1957). Gryphon; University of Leeds: Leeds.
- A Tale of Two Cities. (1958). New Nigerian Forum: London.
- Madame Etienne's Establishment (1957). Gryphon; University of Leeds.
- Oji River. ^{+}

=== Non-fiction ===
- The Man Died: Prison Notes of Wole Soyinka (1972). London: Rex Collings. ISBN 9780901720344 OCLC 637318
- Myth, Literature, and the African World (1976). Cambridge: Cambridge University Press. ISBN 9780521211901
- Aké: The Years of Childhood (1981). London: Rex Collings. ISBN 9780860361558 OCLC 8282987
- Ìsarà: A Voyage around "Essay" (1989). London: Methuen. ISBN 9780413634108 OCLC 610678177
- Ibadan: The Penkelemes Years: a memoir 1945–1965 (1994). Ibadan, Nigeria: Spectrum Books. ISBN 9789782462466 OCLC 33104422
- The Open Sore of a Continent: A Personal Narrative of the Nigerian Crisis (1996). New York: Oxford University Press:. ISBN 9780195105575
- The Burden of Memory, The Muse of Forgiveness. (1999). New York: Oxford University Press. ISBN 9780195122053
- Climate of Fear: The Quest for Dignity in a Dehumanized World (2005). New York: Random House. ISBN 9780812974249
- You Must Set Forth at Dawn (2006). New York: Random House. ISBN 9780375503658 OCLC 65562688
- Harmattan Haze on an African Spring (2012).

=== Poetry collections ===
- Idanre and Other Poems (1967). Methuen: London. ISBN 9780413320704; 1968: Hill & Wang. ISBN 9780809057252
- Poems from Prison (1969). Rex Collings: London.
- A Shuttle in the Crypt (1972). London: Rex Collings. ISBN 9780809013647; Eyre Methuen. ISBN 9780413288905; 1987: New York: Hill & Wang. ISBN 9780809086672
- Mandela's Earth and Other Poems (1988). New York: Random House. ISBN 9780394570219

=== Essays and lectures ===
- Cor, Teach (1959). University of Ibadan: Ibadan, Nigeria.
- Oga Look Properly (1960). Nigerian Radio Times: Lagos, Nigeria.
- The Old Boys' Dinner (1960). Nigerian Radio Times: Lagos, Nigeria.
- Paris, Wole Soyinka (1960). Nigerian Radio Times: Lagos, Nigeria.
- The Future of West African Writing (1960). The Horn: Ibadan, Nigeria.
- Of Power and Change (1966). African Statesman.
- The Writer in a Modern African State. L'Afrique Actuelle: Paris, France.
- Who Invented the Teenager?. (1965). The Drum: Lagos, Nigeria.
- Amos Tutuola on Stage (1963). University of Ibadan: Ibadan, Nigeria.
- Art, Dialogue, and Outrage: Essays on Literature and Culture (1993). New York: Pantheon Books.
- Climate of Fear: The Reith Lectures (2004). Reith lectures series. Ibadan, Nigeria: Bookcraft. ISBN 9789782030641 OCLC 439221570
- Of Africa (2012). New Haven: Yale University Press. ISBN 9780300140460 OCLC 785721970
- Beyond Aesthetics: Use, Abuse, and Dissonance in African Art Traditions (2019). New Haven: Yale University Press. ISBN 9780300247626 OCLC 1135324306

=== Translations ===
- The Forest of a Thousand Daemons (1968). London: Nelson Publishers. (A translation of D. O. Fagunwa's Ògbójú Ọdẹ nínú Igbó Irúnmalẹ̀); 1969: New York: Humanities Press, Inc.
- In the Forest of Olodumare (2010). (A translation of D. O. Fagunwa's Igbó Olódùmarè.)

== Film ==
- Blues for a Prodigal (1963)
- Kongi's Harvest (1973)
