= 1986 Nobel Prize in Literature =

- Wole Soyinka
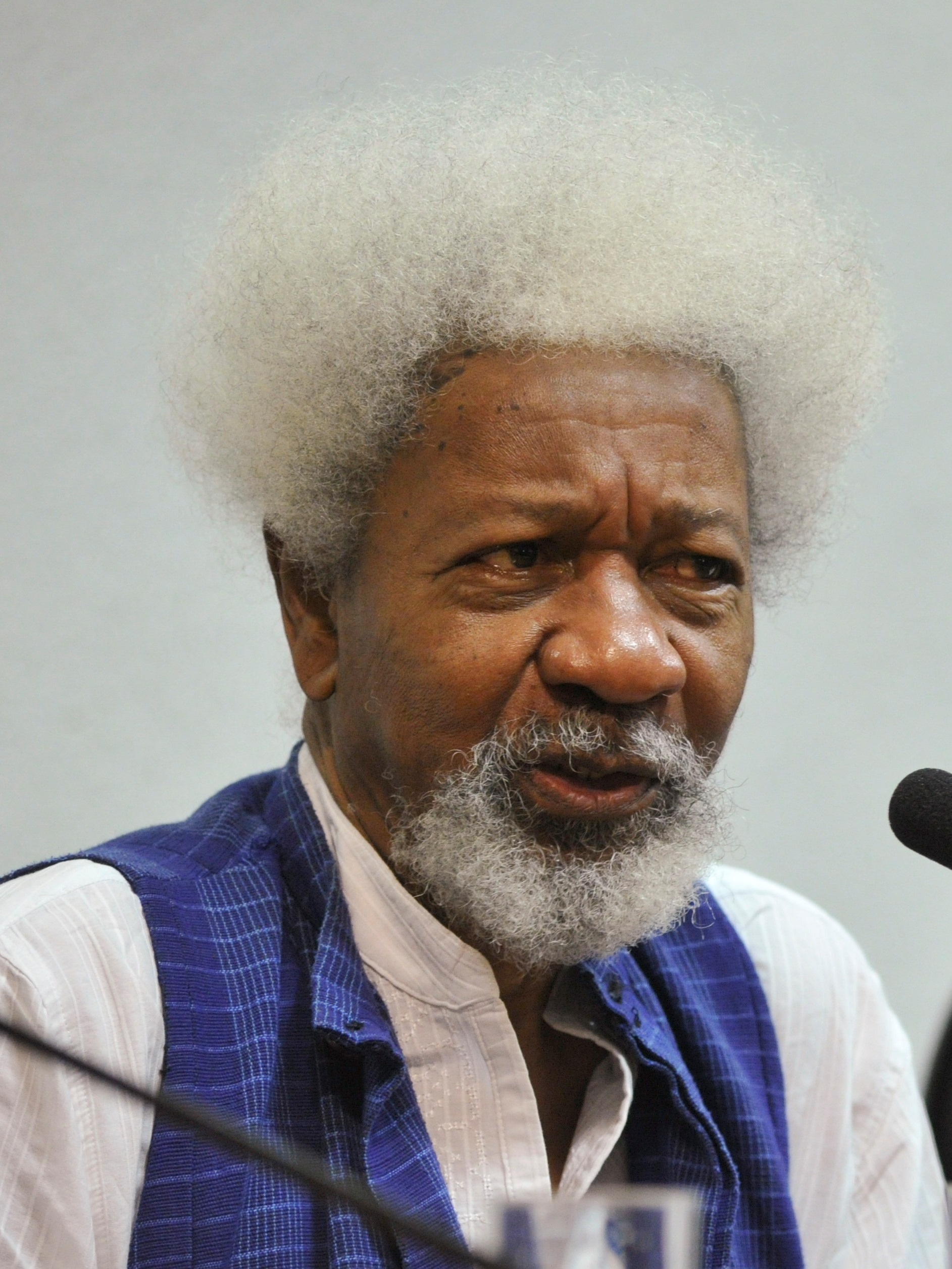
- "who in a wide cultural perspective and with poetic overtones fashions the drama of existence."
- Date: 16 October 1986 (announcement); 10 December 1986 (ceremony)
- Location: Stockholm, Sweden
- Presented by: Swedish Academy
- First award: 1901
- Website: Official website

The 1986 Nobel Prize in Literature was awarded to the Nigerian writer Wole Soyinka (born 1934) "who in a wide cultural perspective and with poetic overtones fashions the drama of existence." He is the first African recipient of the prize.

== Laureate ==
Wole Soyinka is most well known for his playwriting with The Lion and the Jewel (1959), A Dance of the Forests (1960), Kongi's Harvest (1964), and Death and the King's Horseman (1975) as among his best works. Along with his writing career, he has worked as an actor and in theaters in Nigeria and Great Britain. Poems, novels, and essays are also included in his body of work, among them The Interpreters (1965), Season of Anomy (1972), and Aké: The Years of Childhood (1981). Although Soyinka writes in English, the Yoruba culture of his home Nigeria and its myths, stories, and rituals are deeply ingrained in his writings. His writing also draws from Western traditions, from modernist play to classical tragedies.

== Pre-announcement speculations ==
As the Swedish Academy only months before the prize decision had invited a number of African writers to discuss African literature at a conference in Stockholm before them, it was speculated that the academy intended to award the 1986 Nobel Prize in Literature to an African writer. The Nigerian writers Chinua Achebe and Wole Soyinka were believed to be strongest candidates for the prize.

== Reactions ==
When Soyinka was awarded, he became the first African laureate. He was described as one "who in a wide cultural perspective and with poetic overtones fashions the drama of existence". Reed Way Dasenbrock writes that the award of the Nobel Prize in Literature to Soyinka is "likely to prove quite controversial and thoroughly deserved". He also notes that "it is the first Nobel Prize awarded to an African writer or to any writer from the 'new literatures' in English that have emerged in the former colonies of the British Empire." Lars Olof Franzén, cultural editor of Dagens Nyheter, said that it would have been difficult for the Swedish Academy to give the first African prize to a white South African author such as Nadine Gordimer (awarded in 1991) or André Brink, who had frequently been mentioned as likely contenders for the prize. Soyinka himself expressed the belief that the award had not been bestowed on him but on Africa itself: "I don't for a minute consider that the prize is just for me," he said. "It's for what I represent. I'm a part of the whole literary tradition of Africa."

In Nigeria, the Nobel prize awarded to Wole Soyinka was widely celebrated. Writer Chinua Achebe, president and founder of the Association of Nigerian Authors, said: "This is the year of Wole Soyinka’s Nobel Prize. We rejoice with him on his magnificent achievement. A lot has already been said or written about it and no doubt more will be said. For me what matters is that after the oriki and the celebrations we should say to ourselves: One of us has proved that we can beat the white man at his own game. That is wonderful for us and for the white man. But now we must turn away and play our own game."

== Nobel lecture ==
His Nobel lecture, This Past Must Address Its Present, was devoted to the South African freedom-fighter Nelson Mandela. Soyinka's speech was an outspoken criticism of apartheid and the politics of racial segregation imposed on the majority by the National South African government.

== Award ceremony ==
At the award ceremony in Stockholm on 10 December 1986, Lars Gyllensten of the Swedish Academy spoke about Soyinka's work and pointed out that "it is chiefly the dramas that stand out as Wole Soyinka’s most significant achievement". He then addressed the laureate and said:

In your versatile writings you have been able to synthesize a very rich heritage from your own country, ancient myths and old traditions, with literary legacies and traditions of European culture. There is a third component, a most important component in what you have thus achieved – your own genuine and impressive creativity as an artist, a master of language, and your commitment as a dramatist and writer of poetry and prose to problems of general and deep significance for man, modern or ancient.
