= Biodun Jeyifo =

Nigerian scholar (1946–2026)

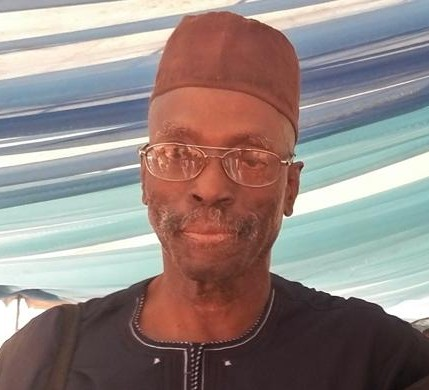
- Jeyifo in January 2026
- Born: 5 January 1946; Ibadan, Colony and Protectorate of Nigeria
- Died: 11 February 2026 (aged 80); Ibadan, Oyo State, Nigeria
- Other names: BJ; Bamako Jaji
- Education: University of Ibadan; New York University
- Occupations: Scholar; critic; Professor
- Employer: Harvard University

Biodun Jeyifo (5 January 1946 – 11 February 2026) was a Nigerian academic, critic, public intellectual, cultural theorist and a specialist in world Anglophone literature and culture.

Jeyifo attained great prominence in African intellectual circles and transcontinental circuits of academia for his analyses of capitalist modernity and its social and cultural crises. It has been said of him [that] "No other scholar, apart from Edward Said, Gayatri Spivak and Homi Bhabha, is more attentive to the radically dispersed accents or strands of thinking the post-colonial the way BJ has done."

He was generally regarded as the world's preeminent scholarly authority on the works and career of Wole Soyinka. His award-winning book on the 1986 Nobel laureate, Wole Soyinka: Politics, Poetics and Postcolonialism (Cambridge University Press, 2004), is regarded as the most comprehensive study of the author's work, and the most sophisticated single author study of any writer in African postcolonial studies. While the leading scholars and critics of Soyinka's works took the view that the difficulties and complexities in the Nigerian writer's body of work were either merely self-constitutive or wilfully obscurantist, in this book and other books and essays on Soyinka's writings, Jeyifo based his analysis on the premise that modernist and avant-gardist techniques and language were at the heart of the alleged difficulties and complexities. The book is notable for its detailed readings of Soyinka's greatest works of drama, poetry and fictional and nonfiction prose, combining intellectual rigour with sheer writing pleasure in his explications.

== Early life and education ==
Born in Ibadan, Colony and Protectorate of Nigeria, on 5 January 1946, Jeyifo had all his formal education – primary, secondary and tertiary – in that city when it was the cultural and intellectual capital of a decolonizing Nigeria and one of the most cosmopolitan cities in the African continent. This background is deeply and widely reflected in Jeyifo's work, career and honours. Studying at the University of Ìbàdàn for his bachelor's degree, he graduated in 1970 with first-class honours in English — the third student in the university history to do so after Dan Izevbaye and Molara Ogundipe. His postgraduate education and subsequent professional career in the United States built on the foundations of the intellectual and cultural cosmopolitanism that he had absorbed from his basic formal education at home in Nigeria.

Jeyifo gained a master's degree from New York University in 1973, going on to earn a PhD in 1975 from the same university, where Richard Schechner was his supervisor. Jeyifo also held a D.Litt. (honoris causa) from Ọbafẹmi Awolọwọ University. He taught at Cornell University, Oberlin College, and Harvard University. Jeyifo was the first president of the Academic Staff Union of Universities (ASUU) in Nigeria, when he taught at the University of Ife.

== Career ==
In Nigeria, Jeyifo taught at the University of Ibadan (1975–77) and the University of Ife (now Obafemi Awolowo University, 1977–87). Then he taught for one year (1987–88) at Oberlin College, Ohio before moving to Cornell University in Ithaca, New York, where he taught from 1989 to 2006 in the English department. Thereafter, he moved to Harvard University in 2006 in the Comparative Literature and African and African American Studies departments, a position from which he retired in 2019. In all these institutions, Jeyifo invested a lot of intellectual and moral capital in working very closely with undergraduate students, graduate students and younger, untenured junior faculty.

Beyond his own home institutions, Jeyifo also worked extensively on faculty development projects at other universities and on major international, interdisciplinary and non-Eurocentric scholarly projects. Among the highlights are:

1. The Free University of Berlin's International Center for Research in Interweaving Cultures of Performance began a project that led to the publication of a "first-of-its kind" book on indigenous theatre concepts of five non-Western regions of the world that have no sources in Western theater traditions and practices. For this project, Jeyifo served as one of the supervising editors and, with Femi Osofisan, wrote the Introduction to the Yoruba/Africa section of the book. In addition, Jeyifo gave the keynote lecture to launch the project in Berlin on April 20, 2008. Thereafter, he was associated with the center as visiting professor in 2008, 2009, 2010, 2016 and 2017;
2. In the 2011, 2012, 2014 and 2015 academic sessions, Jeyifo had a visiting professorship at Peking University (PKU) in the People's Republic of China, the objective of which was to lay the foundations of Africanist literary and theatrical studies in PKU itself and in China as a whole. Later on, Professors Femi Osofisan of the University of Ibadan and Chima Anyadike of OAU-Ife joined Jeyifo in this project which entailed teaching formal courses at PKU and giving lectures and seminars at various other PRC universities.
3. For more than a decade between 2006 and 2019, and mostly during the summer, Jeyifo met with other scholars from Europe, the United States, India, China and the Caribbean in a project with the title Literature: A World History (LAWH). Among other places, the group met in Leiden, Istanbul, Hong Kong and Beijing. At the end of the project, the group produced a six-volume new non- or post-Eurocentric literary history of the world published by Wiley in 2022. The volume on Africa was jointly edited by Jeyifo, Eileen Julien and Karin Barber, in addition to the co-editor's individual chapters in the volume.
4. In the spring of 2021, The British Journal of Sociology published an essay by Jeyifo titled "An Illuminati and its Acolytes: Critical Theory in the Text and in the World". This essay was one of four invited commentaries on Bernard Harcourt's magisterial "Critique and Practice: A Critical Philosophy of Illusions, Values, and Action". Of the four invited commentaries, Jeyifo's was apparently so effective in making Harcourt rethink the entire conceptual architecture and conclusions of his book that he created a year-long course and public seminar series titled "Revolutionary 13/13: Worldly Philosophers" at Columbia University in New York City in the 2021–22 academic session. Jeyifo delivered a lecture (https://www.youtube.com/watch?v=RdRi-CO76c8) and led the discussion at the first seminar on 22 September 2021.

== Political activism and public engagement ==
At Ife and Cornell, Jeyifo joined other faculty members in producing doctoral students who subsequently became distinguished academics in their own right. Additionally, several of the students that he taught and mentored at the University of Ibadan and OAU-Ife went on to become book publishers, journalists, media practitioners or executives, many of whom played leading roles in the struggle against military autocracy and predatory civilian misrule.

Altogether, Jeyifo's teaching, research and publications in the 1970s through the 1980s were pivotal in transforming the curriculum of Nigerian universities. In this unprecedented development, Marxist literary, theatre and cultural studies, Marxist philosophy and historiography, and Marxist social sciences became so prevalent in the curriculum of the country's universities that the dons were accused by the government of "not teaching what they were paid to teach". In a retort to this accusation that became famous, Jeyifo asserted that he and his cohorts in the movement were indeed teaching what they were paid to teach on account of texts like Chinua Achebe's Things Fall Apart and No Longer at Ease and Wole Soyinka's Season of Anomy and The Man Died that were savagely critical of the state of affairs in the postcolonial era.

Much later at Cornell University in the early 2000s, Jeyifo was a member of a group of English department faculty that gave free weekly classes to inmates at the all-male maximum-security correctional facility of Auburn in upstate New York. On this project, he testified that it was an unforgettable experience for him to teach the writings and thought of the likes of Frantz Fanon, Amilcar Cabral, Nelson Mandela, James Baldwin and Chinua Achebe, among others, to prison inmates, some of whom were lifers.

== Political and cultural journalism ==
Between the mid-2000s and the early 2020s, Jeyifo maintained weekly columns titled "Talakawa Liberation Forum" (TLF) and "Talakawa Liberation Courier" (TLC) in two of the leading Nigerian newspapers, The Guardian and The Nation. This extension of his political activism might have crested in Nigeria's Fourth Republic, but it began during his time as a postgraduate student at the University of Ibadan in 1971, when he wrote drama and theatre reviews for the now-defunct Daily Sketch. But for a brief hiatus during his years of graduate school in the U.S., Jeyifo continuously practised political and cultural journalism from a leftist perspective, almost as a driven, proselytizing mission for more than five decades.

Using the sobriquet "Bamako Jaji", Jeyifo wrote mostly for The Guardian, but also for The African Guardian and Afriscope, the latter two being weekly news magazines published in Lagos between the late 1970s and mid-1990s. A selection of the TLF series in The Guardian was published as Against the Predators' Republic in 2016 by Carolina Academic Press. Even at more than 600 pages, the volume represents only a partial collection of Jeyifo's journalistic writings from the time of their inception in 1971.

== Personal life and death ==
Jeyifo died in Ibadan, Oyo State, on 11 February 2026, weeks after a symposium had been held on his 80th birthday at the MUSON Centre, Lagos, celebrating his life, intellectual engagements and engaging scholarship on African literature. He was survived by three children: Okunola Bamidele Jeyifous, a University of Chicago-trained neuroscientist who teaches at DePaul University in Chicago; Olalekan Babajide Jeyifous, a Cornell-trained architect, sculptor and public art muralist who lives in Brooklyn, NY; and Ruth Ayoka Samuels, an undergraduate student at Cornell currently working with a group of community activists providing shelter for homeless people and refuge for victims of spousal abuse and violence.

== Awards and distinctions ==
- W. E. B. Du Bois Medal, Hutchins Center for African and African American Research, Harvard University, 2019
- Honorary D.Litt., Obafemi Awolowo University, Ile-Ife, 2018.
- Journal of the African Literature Association, Volume 12, Issue No. 1 (2018), "Critical Masters: Biodun Jeyifo" (edited by Tejumola Olaniyan).
- Journal of African Cultural Studies, Volume 30, Issue No. 2 (2018): special issue featuring a debate between Jeyifo and Ngugi wa Thiong'o on language.
- Fellow of the Chinese Academy of Social Sciences, 2011
- The Yearbook of Comparative Literature, No. 55, 2009 - Interview with Biodun Jeyifo by Eyal Peretz, Journal Editor
- West Africa Review (Issue No. 11, 2008) - Biodun Jeyifo and Africa
- Outstanding Academic Texts (OATS) award of the American Library Association for the book, Wole Soyinka – Politics, Poetics and Postcolonialism (Cambridge University Press, 2004); 2007.
- Jeyifo is the subject of a documentary entitled Biodun Jeyifo - An Exemplary Life, directed by Femi Odugbemi.

== Publications ==
- By Popular Demand: The Yoruba Traveling Theater of Nigeria (Nigeria Magazine, 1984)
- Contemporary Nigerian Literature (Nigeria Magazine, 1985), ISBN 9789781730344)
- The Truthful Lie: Essays in the Sociology of African Drama (London: New Beacon Books, 1985, ISBN 9780901241634)
- Wole Soyinka: Politics, Poetics and Post colonialism (Cambridge, 2004, ISBN 9780521110730)
- Things Fall Apart, Things Fall Together (BookCraft Africa, 2010)
- Against the Predators' Republic (Carolina Academic Press, 2016, ISBN 978-1-61163-792-2)
- Apostrophes: To Friendship, Socialism and Democracy (Bookcraft, Ibadan, 2021)

=== As editor ===
- Conversations with Wole Soyinka (University Press of Mississippi, 2001, ISBN 9781578063376)
- Perspectives on Wole Soyinka: Freedom and Complexity (University Press of Mississippi, 2001, ISBN 9781578069309)
- Modern African Drama (Norton Critical Edition, W. W. Norton & Company, 2002, ISBN 978-0-393-97529-1)
- Africa in the World & The World in Africa: Essays in Honour of Abiola Irele (Africa World Press, 2011).
