= Climate of Fear =

Book by Wole Soyinka

- Author: Wole Soyinka
- Language: English
- Genre: Non-fiction
- Publisher: Random House Trade Paperbacks
- Publication date: 25 January 2005
- Publication place: Nigeria
- Pages: 145
- ISBN: 978-0-812-97424-9

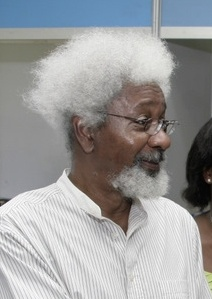
A picture of Wole Soyinka

Climate of Fear: The Quest for Dignity in a Dehumanized World is a literary work by Wole Soyinka, a Nigerian playwright, novelist, poet, and essayist who is also the author of The Bacchae of Euripides (1969), Season of Anomy amongst other works. Through this non-fiction Soyinka addresses the way fear affects individuals in different ways, how fear is used in controlling people.

== Synopsis ==
The book centers on human's concept, view on fear with different stories which he uses to prove that fear has been around for a while. Years ago, people were afraid of various things like the atomic bomb. But in recent time, fears are now much more complicated, close to us through invisible, hidden powers called the "quasi state".

Soyinka says this climate of fear didn't just start after September 11, 2001; it has been around for a while as the book traces it back to the year 1989 after an act of political sabotage hit a UTA passenger plane over the Republic of Niger which followed a widely publicized incident in Lockerbie, Scotland, shaped the outline of the current atmosphere of fear.

== Background ==
The book has a mix of stories about life and essays about politics, It was delivered during a lecture he gave at London's Royal Institution, Reith Lectures, in March 2004. At the start of the book, Soyinka talks on his past experiences, his fight with the Nigerian government during a war.

After talking about his own experiences, Soyinka talks about big events in the world. He remembers how he felt that the world changed not only on September 11, 2001, but also in the year 1988 when a plane exploded over Lockerbie, Scotland, and another exploded over Niger the next year.
