= List of awards and honours received by Wole Soyinka =

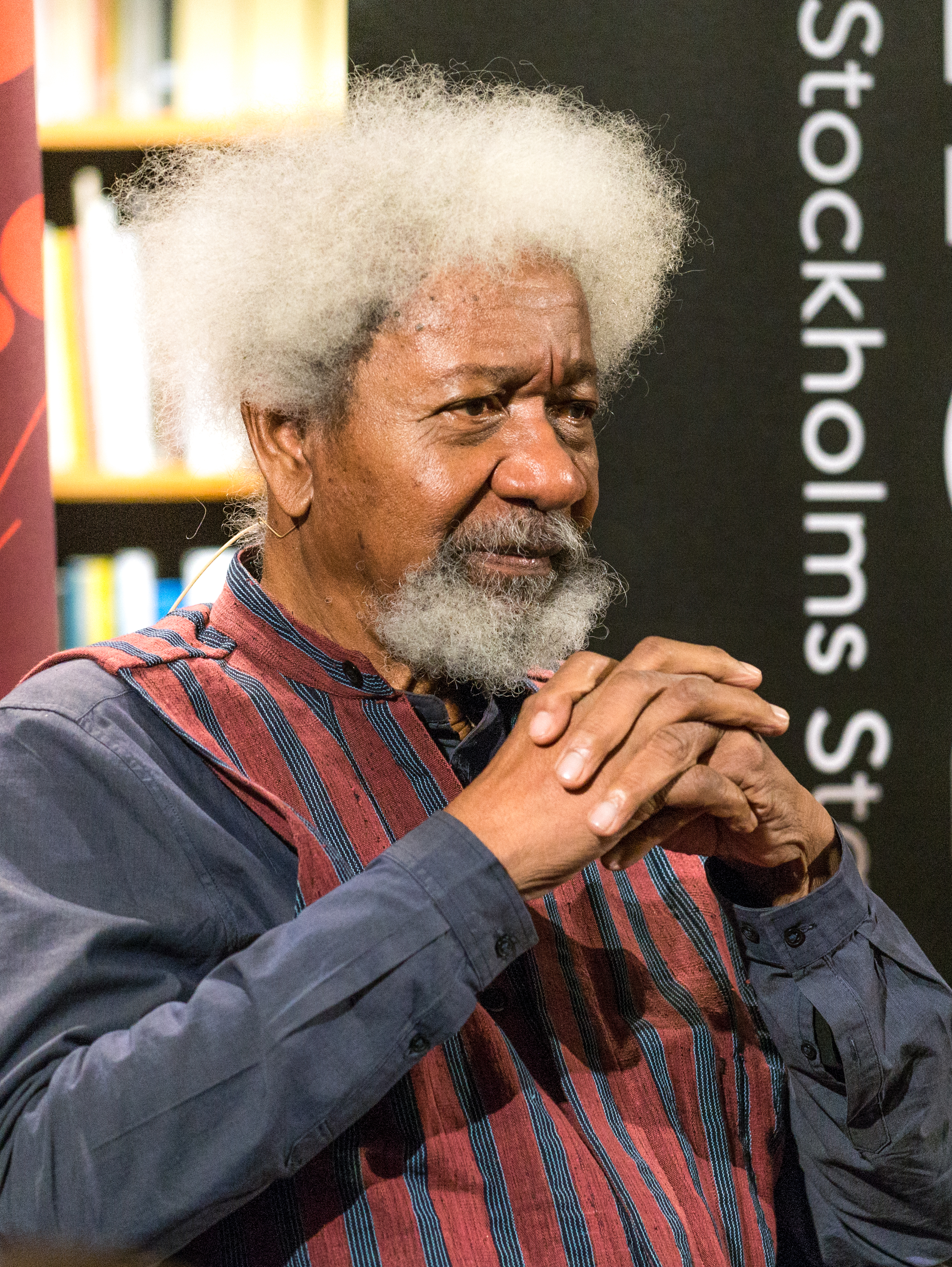
Wole Soyinka in 2018.

Nigerian writer, playwright, and poet Wole Soyinka (1934) was honoured by universities, literary organisations, government agencies, and special interest groups. His honours include the 1986 Nobel Prize in Literature for his "wide cultural perspective and poetic overtones fashioning the drama of existence" and the Special Prize category of the Europe Theatre Prize in 2017 for his consistency "as a proponent of an ideal bridge between Europe and Africa in a deeply delicate period for the present and the future of our continent".

In 1986, Soyinka was conferred the Commander of the Order of the Federal Republic (CFR), a national honour of Nigeria, by Ibrahim Babangida.

== Awards ==
Year	Honor	Notes	Ref.
1983	RSL Fellow	Elected by the Royal Society of Literature.	
1983	Anisfield-Wolf Book Award	For his autobiography, Ake: The Years of Childhood.	
1986	Nobel Prize in Literature	For Soyinka's literary works.	
1986	Eni Enrico Mattei Prize for the Humanities	Funded by Agip.	
1986	Commander of the Order of the Federal Republic	Awarded by Ibrahim Babangida; The award is the second highest national honour of Nigeria.	
1999	Benson Medal	Awarded by the Royal Society of Literature.	
2009	Golden Plate Award	Given by the American Academy of Achievement, this award was presented to Soyinka by Archbishop Desmond Tutu at an awards ceremony at St. George's Cathedral, Cape Town, South Africa.	
2013	Lifetime Achievement Award	Part of the Anisfield-Wolf Book Awards.	
2014	International Humanist Award	Awarded by International Humanist and Ethical Union (presently called Humanists International).	
2017	"Special Prize", Europe Theatre Prize	Given by the European Commission to a person, according to them, who has "contributed to the realisation of cultural events that promote understanding and the exchange of knowledge between peoples".	

== Honorary degrees ==
- University of Leeds, 1973
- Yale University, 1980
- University of Toronto, 1992
- Harvard University, 1993
- Emory University, 1996
- SOAS University of London, 2002
- Princeton University, 2005
- Federal University of Agriculture, Abeokuta, 2018
- University of Cambridge, 2022

== Other awards ==
- 1989: Soyinka was enstooled as the "Akogun of Isara-Remo", a Nigerian chief, by the Odemo of the Isara people, his paternal clan.
- 2005: Soyinka was enstooled as the "Akinlatun of Egbaland", a Nigerian chief, by the Alake of the Egba people, his maternal clan.
