= Chronicles from the Land of the Happiest People on Earth =

2021 novel by Wole Soyinka

- First edition
- Author: Wole Soyinka
- Genre: Literary fiction
- Set in: Fictional country
- Publisher: Bookcraft Africa; Pantheon Books; Bloomsbury Circus
- Publication date: 2021
- Publication place: Nigeria
- Media type: Print
- ISBN: 978-0-593-31447-0

Chronicles from the Land of the Happiest People on Earth is a 2021 novel written by Nigerian playwright and novelist Wole Soyinka. It was released on 28 September 2021 by Bookcraft Africa.

The novel is a political satire, inspired by a report that Nigerians are among the happiest people on Earth. It tells the story of Dr. Kighare Menka, a surgeon who discovers a human body parts black-market scheme going on in his hospital. It is Soyinka's third novel, and his first since Season of Anomy, which was published in 1973.

== Synopsis ==
The novel takes place in an imaginary version of Nigeria. A secret society made up of highly-placed members of the nation's political and religious elite trades in human body parts for use in religious rituals.

The body parts are stolen from a hospital run by Dr. Kighare Menka, a surgeon who treats war victims and whose friend Duyole Pitan-Payne is about to begin a job at the United Nations in New York City as the representative of Nigeria. Duyole is targeted by mysterious forces who try to prevent him from taking the new position.

Duyole is killed after Dr. Menka informs him of the scheme going on in his hospital.

== Background ==
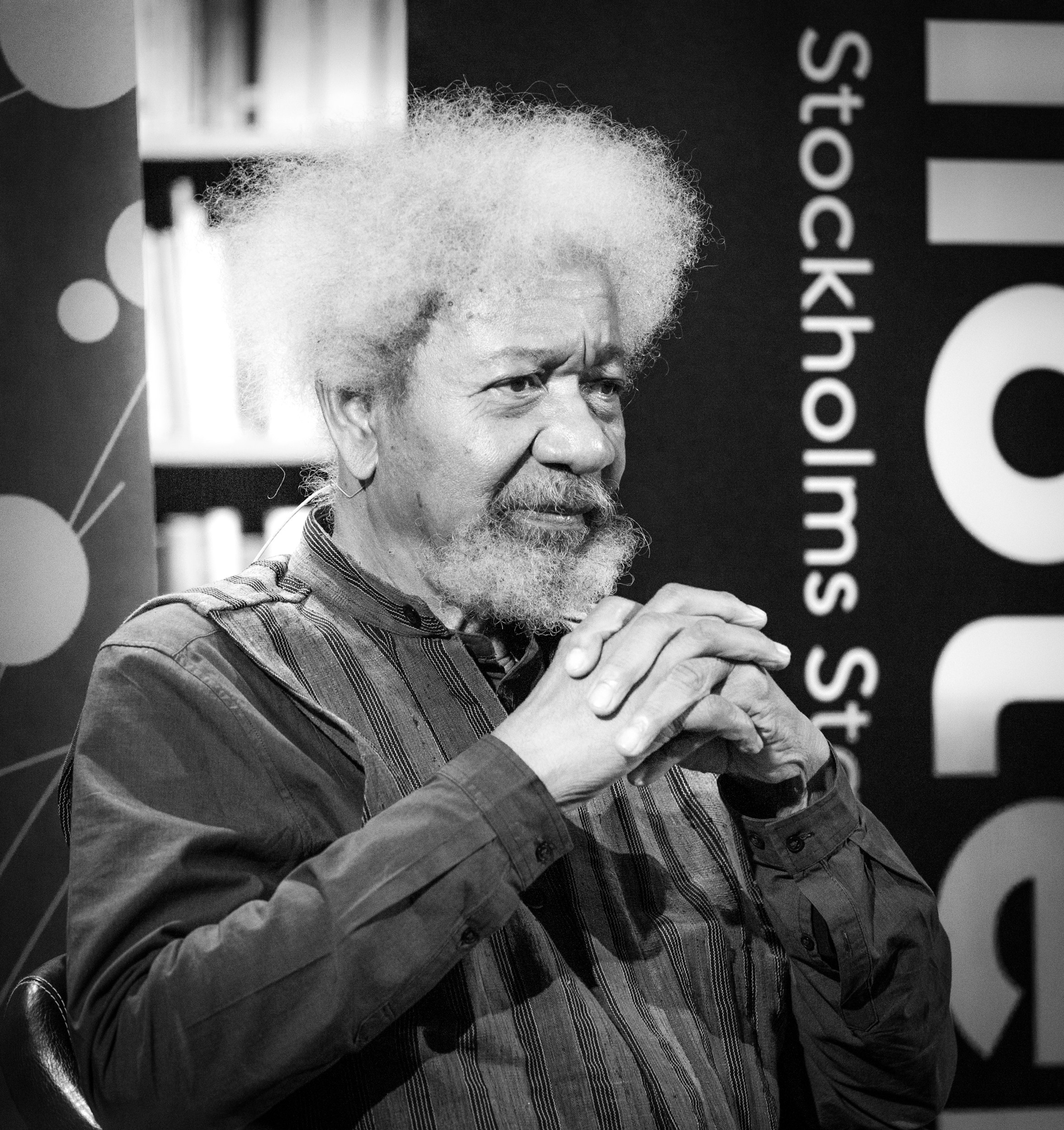
Wole Soyinka during a lecture at Stockholm Public Library on 4 October 2018.

Wole Soyinka, who won the 1986 Nobel Prize in Literature, was inspired by a report that Nigerians are among the happiest people on Earth, began writing almost two decades later and before the COVID-19 pandemic. The book was written in two sessions of 16 days between Senegal and Ghana. According to Soyinka, the pandemic lockdown helped him finish the novel, amongst other writings, in his compound in Abeokuta.

Chronicles which is Soyinka's third novel was released in 2021 by Bookcraft Africa, Pantheon Books and Bloomsbury Circus, almost fifty years since his last novel, Season of Anomy which was published in 1973.

In 2023, the French translation was published by Éditions du Seuil, and a translation in Italian was published by La nave di Teseo.

The novel is intended as an allegory to the state-sponsored corruption that is common in Nigeria and similar African nations.

== Reception ==
The novel received a starred review from Kirkus Reviews which lauded the wordplay, while Publishers Weekly praised the novel as "[a] biting satire that looks at corruption in an imaginary contemporary Nigeria, Chronicles is also an intriguing and droll whodunit." and "[a] brilliant story that takes on politics, class, corruption, and religion from the very first chapters. It highlights Soyinka's lush, elegant language." Neil Munshi of the Financial Times described Chronicles as "a brutally satirical look at power and corruption in Nigeria, told in the form of a whodunnit involving three university friends."

Reviewing for The Guardian, Nigerian writer Ben Okri called the novel "a vast danse macabre" and "Soyinka's greatest novel, his revenge against the insanities of the nation's ruling class and one of the most shocking chronicles of an African nation in the 21st century." Colombian writer Juan Gabriel Vásquez, writing for The New York Times, noted that Soyinka wrote the novel as a "lament for the spirit of his native Nigeria," and while the plot is "convoluted, obscure at times, [and] often tying itself in too many knots," the novel is ultimately a successful exploration of "the crossroads between corruption, religious fanaticism, endemic resentments and a legacy of colonial divisiveness."

M. A. Orthofer rated the novel B+ in a Complete Review review, calling it an "impressively-wrought work", while noting that "the intricacies of its sentences and its plot are challenging". Keishel William, writing for NPR, was somewhat less positive, concluding that the novel is not among Soyinka's best works, but "[t]he parts of the novel that are good are immensely good – and in true Soyinka fashion, the writing tosses you right into the middle of Nigerian life, for better or worse."
