= The Strong Breed =

Play by Wole Soyinka

The Strong Breed is one of the best-known plays by Wole Soyinka. It is a tragedy that concludes with an individual's sacrifice for the benefit of the community. The play centers on the tradition of egungun, a Yoruba festival tradition in which a village scapegoat carries out the community's evil and is exiled from civilization.

== Background ==
Soyinka's 1963 film Culture in Transition contains an abridged version of The Strong Breed. The play was first published in London in 1964 and then 1969 by Oxford University Press, then subsequently published by Rex Collings in 1971. The play was produced Off-Broadway in 1967 at Greenwich Mews Theater in New York.

== Plot ==
Eman, the play's protagonist, is a member of the "strong breed," a group of carriers who dump a boat into the ocean yearly, the contents of which symbolically represent evils that took place that year. Mothers of the strong breed die during childbirth, and when his girlfriend Omae dies, Eman moves to another village and becomes a teacher, with the assistance of leader Jaguna's daughter, Sunma.

In this village, the "strong breed" is not hereditary; instead, an outsider -- usually a stranger, or someone with a disability -- is chosen by the village as a scapegoat. While in Eman's old village, carriers returned to the village after their ritual was done, in Eman's new village the carrier is beaten and exiled. Eman nevertheless takes on the role to spare a young mute boy named Ifada the same fate. The ritual takes an unexpected turn as Eman flees. His pursuers set a trap for him that results in his death.

On the eve of the New Year, Sunma tries to convince Eman to leave the village for some reason unknown to Eman. Eman refuses to listen to Sunma, as he is aware that she harbours feelings for him. He insists on staying back in the village, even when Sunma asks him to stay away for a few days.

Ifada, a mentally invalid man, approaches Eman's hut sheepishly. However, Sunma is disgusted to see him and rebukes him harshly. Eman is surprised at Sunma's behaviour, as she previously used to treat him with kindness. She chases Ifada away.

After some time, a little girl, who was dragging an effigy, crossed the house. Eman spoke to her affably and even gave her a cloth to dress her effigy. However, the girl did not go near him, as her mother instructed her to stay away from others as she was sick. The little girl told Eman that the other children would not play with her as their mothers instructed them to. She also said that the effigy will be burned in the New Year, and it will take her illness with it. Sunma stops Eman from conversing with the girl and asks her to go away. She tells Eman that, irrespective of age, the people in this village are filled with evil.

Ifada appears at the scene, and the girl takes him with her to the play with the effigy.

After a while, Ifada comes running to the house, being chased by a mob. Eman lets him into his house without paying heed to Sunma's protests. The chasers arrive, led by Jaguna and Oroge. They explain that Ifada is to be sacrificed as a carrier and that Eman will face the consequences if he doesn't let them take Ifada. Eman refuses to let them take Ifada; instead, he is taken away to be the carrier.

Eman tries to run away and remembers his past. A twelve-year-old Eman is in a separate hut and is educated under the supervision of his tutor. Omae visits him even though girls are not supposed to go near these huts where the male students reside. Eman tries to make Omae leave, but his tutor arrives before he can send Omae away. The tutor tries to take advantage of Omae, and Eman rebels against him and leaves the village, leaving Omae in his father's care. He returns after a few years and finds Omae still waiting for him. However, Omae dies after giving birth to Eman's child. Eman leaves his village again after her death.

He also remembers how his father, a carrier in their village, tried to pass on his legacy to Eman, stating that they belong to the strong breed and have strong blood, and it was their call to work as carriers, and how he refused to carry on the job passed down by his forefathers.

In the present, having run for a long time, Eman reaches his own hut again. He is scared that he might get caught if he gets in. He sees that little girl with the effigy again and asks her to fetch him some water from his house. However, the girl slips away and calls on the catchers. Eman is filled with disappointment and runs away while he realises what happened.

Jaguna and Oroge hear from the girl that Eman is thirsty and hatch a plan to catch him while he goes to the river, the only source of water Eman can now access. They dig a pit to trap him. However, Eman falls to his death in that pit. After his death, the villagers are filled with superficial sadness and direct their blaming sight towards Jaguna and Oroge.

== Themes ==
Soyinka's play explores Western classical tragic themes of fate versus free will through African atonement rituals. Critic Mpalive-Hangson Msiska places the play in the tradition of existentialist literature and Biblical tradition, likening protagonist Eman to a Christ figure. Critic James Gibbs suggests that Eugene O'Neill, whom Soyinka chose as the subject of his master's thesis, was an inspiration.

The play makes significant use of flashbacks.
