= Beyond Aesthetics =

2020 essay collection by Wole Soyinka

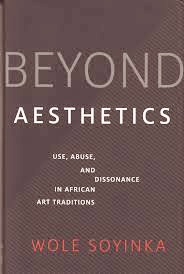
- Author: Wole Soyinka
- Language: English
- Publication date: November 2019
- Publication place: United Kingdom
- ISBN: 978-0-300-24762-6

Beyond Aesthetics: Use, Abuse, and Dissonance in African Art Traditions is a book of essays by Nigerian writer Wole Soyinka. It discusses Soyinka's personal motivations as an art collector and explores the politics of aesthetics and collecting.

== Synopsis ==
The book contains a preface and three chapters. The preface begins the book with Soyinka's experience seeing the African Renaissance Monument in Senegal and an arts festival named "AFRICA 92" in the U.K. The three chapters are titled "Oga, Na Original Fake, I Swear", "Procreative Deities: The Orisa’s Triumphal March", and "From Aso-Ebi to N****wood" (referring to Nollywood, the Nigerian film industry).

Wole Soyinka describes his journey as a collector of Yoruba art, and his exploration of the cultural, historical, and personal dimensions of African art. Soyinka reflects on his encounters with various artworks, recounting moments of discovery and the impact these pieces have had on him. These objects, with the presence of mortals, muses, and deities, serve as gateways to narratives that resonate with Africa’s rich cultural heritage.

Soyinka examines the role of identity, tradition, and originality in the creation, collection, and exhibition of African art. He critiques the enduring effects of colonial and religious suppression on African artistic traditions, while also addressing controversies surrounding the ownership and interpretation of specific objects. He describes how art collecting can reclaim and preserve tradition, advocating for a reclamation of Africa’s artistic legacy and emphasizing the importance of contextualizing art within its cultural and historical roots.

The book closes with a call to action for African artists, filmmakers, collectors, and curators to actively engage with their aesthetic and cultural histories. Soyinka presents collecting not merely as an act of acquisition but as a way of preserving and reaffirming tradition, offering a deeply personal yet universal perspective on the power and politics of art.

== Composition and publication ==
The essays are based on lectures Soyinka gave in 2017 at Harvard University. The lectures were part of the Richard D. Cohen Lectures series sponsored by the Hutchins Center for African and African American Research. The book was first published by Yale University Press in November 2019.
