= The Invention =

1957 play by Wole Soyinka

The Invention is a 1957 unpublished play by Wole Soyinka. It was first performed at the Royal Court Theatre in 1959. The play portrays the story of seven South African men who attempts to produce a foolproof method of racial identity.

== Critical reception ==
Larson criticised the play as"clearly a lesser drama than those which Soyinka- was soon to write". He argued that the script is not well polished and that the play was written when Soyinka was at the beginning of his career - twenty-five years old.

== Sources ==
- Ogunyemi, Ernest (15 July 2021). "52 Books in 64 Years: Your Guide to Wole Soyinka's Body of Work". Open Country Mag.
- Larson, Charles (1971). "Soyinka's First Play:". Africa Today. 18 (4). Indiana University Press: 80–83. ISSN 0001-9887. JSTOR 4185199.
