= Eugene O'Neill Theater Center =

Theater facility in Waterford, Connecticut

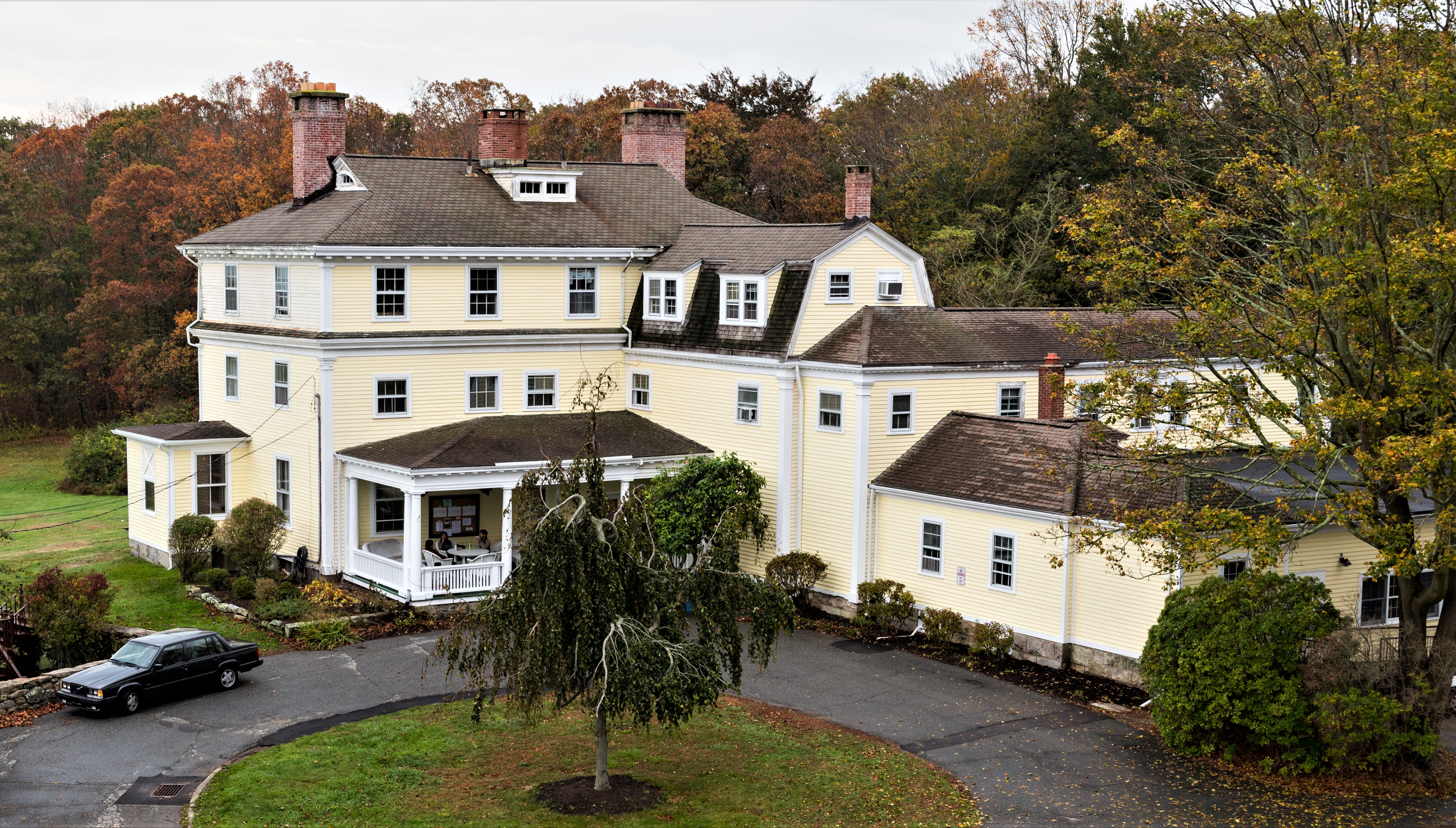
- The Hammond Mansion, "Ironsides", in 2017
- Interactive map of Eugene O'Neill Theater Center
- Address: 305 Great Neck Road; Waterford, Connecticut; United States
- Type: Regional Theater

Construction
- Opened: 1964

Website
- www.theoneill.org
- Walnut Grove
- U.S. National Register of Historic Places
- U.S. Historic district
- Location within Connecticut Location within the United States
- Coordinates: 41°18′37″N 72°6′35″W
- Area: 40 acres (16 ha)
- Built: 1822
- Architectural style: Federal, Gothic Revival, et al.
- NRHP reference No.: 05001044
- Added to NRHP: September 21, 2005

The Eugene O'Neill Theater Center in Waterford, Connecticut, is a 501(c)(3) non-profit theater company founded in 1964 by George C. White. It is commonly referred to as The O'Neill, seating just over 1,000 guests. The center has received two Tony Awards, the 1979 Special Award and the 2010 Regional Theatre Award. President Obama presented the 2015 National Medal of Arts to The O'Neill on September 22, 2016.

The O'Neill is a multi-disciplinary institution; it has had a transformative effect on American theater. The O'Neill pioneered play development and stage readings as a tool for new plays and musicals. It is home to the National Theater Institute (established 1970), an intensive study-away semester for undergraduates. Its major theater conferences include the National Playwrights Conference (est. 1964); the National Critics Conference (est. 1968), the National Musical Theater Conference (est. 1978), the National Puppetry Conference (est. 1990), and the Cabaret & Performance Conference (est. 2005). The first full-fledged National Playwrights Conference took place in the summer of 1966. The Monte Cristo Cottage, Eugene O'Neill's childhood home in New London, Connecticut, was purchased and restored by the O'Neill in the 1970s and is maintained as a museum. The theater's campus, overlooking Long Island Sound in Waterford Beach Park, has four major performance spaces: two indoor and two outdoor. The O'Neill is led by Executive Director Tifanni Gavin.

The estate, also known as Walnut Grove or Hammond Estate, was added to the National Register of Historic Places on September 21, 2005, for its architectural significance, and its associations with Revolutionary War Colonel William North and Edward Crowninshield Hammond, a wealthy railroad tycoon who frequently had the young O'Neill thrown off the property when he owned it.

== Major works ==
The following is a list of plays, musicals, and performance pieces first developed at the O'Neill that have gone on to further success.

National Playwrights Conference

- Slave Play - Jeremy O. Harris (2018)
- I'm Gonna Pray For You So Hard – Halley Feiffer (2014)
- The Nether – Jennifer Haley (2011), Susan Smith Blackburn Prize, 2012
- The Receptionist – Adam Bock (2006)
- Fuddy Meers – David Lindsay-Abaire (1998)
- Trueblinka – Adam Rapp (1997)
- Seven Guitars – August Wilson (1994)
- The Piano Lesson – August Wilson (1986)
- Joe Turner's Come and Gone – August Wilson (1984)
- Fences – August Wilson (1983)
- Danny and the Deep Blue Sea – John Patrick Shanley (1982)
- Ma Rainey's Black Bottom – August Wilson (1982)
- Agnes of God – John Pielmeier (1979)
- FOB – David Henry Hwang (1979)
- Bent – Martin Sherman (1978)
- Uncommon Women and Others – Wendy Wasserstein (1977)
- A History of the American Film – Christopher Durang (1976)
- Madmen and Specialists – Wole Soyinka (1970)
- House of Blue Leaves – John Guare (1966)

National Musical Theater Conference

- Tales of the City (2009)
- In the Heights (2005), Tony Award, (2008)
- Avenue Q (2002), Tony Award, (2004)
- The Wild Party (1997)
- Nine (1979), Tony Award, Best Musical, 1982

Cabaret & Performance Conference

- The Story of My Life (2006)
- title of show (2005)

National Critics Conference

- Chelsea on the Edge: The Adventures of an American Theater – Davi Napoleon

== Notable O'Neill alumni ==
National Theater Institute

- Emily Bergl
- Adam Bock (The Receptionist)
- Gordon Clapp (NYPD Blue)
- Jack Coleman (Heroes)
- Michael Douglas
- Rachel Dratch (Saturday Night Live)
- Chris Elliott (Saturday Night Live)
- Michael Emerson
- Jennifer Garner
- Paul Hodes (US Congressman, New Hampshire)
- Daniel Dae Kim
- Kristina Klebe
- John Krasinski (The Office)
- Jeremy Piven (Entourage)
- Michael Portnoy
- Josh Radnor (How I Met Your Mother)
- Kate Robin (Six Feet Under)
- Sam Robards
- Britain Simons
- Mark Teschner
- Rebecca Taichman
- Elizabeth Olsen
- Adam Shulman
- Cynthia Wade

Conference Playwrights

- Roberto Aguirre-Sacasa
- Edward Albee
- Lee Blessing
- Julia Cho
- Kathleen Clark
- Kia Corthron
- Joe DiPietro
- Christopher Durang
- Jacob Aaron Estes
- Rebecca Gilman
- Gina Gionfriddo
- John Guare
- Willy Holtzman
- Israel Horovitz
- Samuel D. Hunter
- David Henry Hwang
- David Lindsay-Abaire
- Adam Rapp
- John Patrick Shanley
- Sam Shepard
- Regina Taylor
- Wendy Wasserstein
- August Wilson
- Lanford Wilson

== See also ==
- National Register of Historic Places listings in New London County, Connecticut
