= Jero's Metamorphosis =

Jero's Metamorphosis is a continuation of The Trials of Brother Jero, written by Wole Soyinka, a Nigerian playwright, poet and author. The play pictures a prophet at the beach side with his disciples.

== Synopsis ==
Jero's Metamorphosis is a play by Wole Soyinka, depicting the struggles of a Nigerian man, Jero, who manipulates religion for his personal gain. Jero, a self-proclaimed prophet, exploits his followers' beliefs to accumulate wealth and power. The play is a critique of religious hypocrisy and the misuse of faith for selfish ends, showcasing the complexities of Nigerian society and its relationship with religion.

The play was staged in Lagos
