= A Shuttle in the Crypt =

Poetry book by Wole Soyinka

- Author: Wole Soyinka
- Language: English
- Genre: Poetry
- Publisher: Rex Collings
- Publication date: 1972
- Publication place: United Kingdom
- Pages: 89
- ISBN: 978-0809013647

A Shuttle in the Crypt is a 1972 poetry collection by Wole Soyinka. The book comprises Soyinka's twenty-five month experience at Kaduna prison on a disloyalty offence by the Nigerian military government for his efforts in averting the Nigerian Civil War.

== Contents ==
1. "Phases of Peril"
2. "Four archetypes"
3. "Chimes of Silence"
4. "Procession"
5. "Prisonnettes"
6. "Poems of bread and earth"
7. "Epilogue"

== Bibliography ==
- Akingbe, Niyi (6 January 1990). "Writing violence: Problematizing nationhood in Wole Soyinka's A Shuttle in the Crypt". Tydskrif vir Letterkunde. 50 (2). Tydskrif vir Letterkunde Association: 123–148. doi:10.4314/tvl.v50i2.9. ISSN 0041-476X.
- Thwaite, Anthony (1 September 1972). "Book Review: A Shuttle in the Crypt". Index on Censorship. 1 (3–4). doi:10.1177/030642207200103-427. ISSN 0306-4220.
