= Awam Amkpa =

Nigerian academic

- Citizenship: Nigeria, United States
- Education: Obafemi Awolowo University; Ahmadu Bello University; University of Bristol
- Occupations: Artist, practitioner-director, playwright, actor, filmmaker and curator
- Employer: New York University Abu Dhabi
- Notable work: The Man Died (2024)

Awam Amkpa is a Nigerian-American interdisciplinary artist, practitioner-director, playwright, actor, filmmaker and global curator of visual and performing arts and film festivals. He is Vice Provost for the Arts, and Dean of Arts and Humanities at New York University Abu Dhabi."

== Background ==
Awam Amkpa received his B.A. degree in Dramatic Arts from Obafemi Awolowo University, Ile-Ife, Nigeria (where he studied under the tutelage of Wole Soyinka), his M.A. in Drama from Ahmadu Bello University, Zaria, Nigeria, and his Ph.D. from University of Bristol, Bristol, England.

== Career ==
Amkpa has directed and written more than 100 plays and numerous films, most recently, The Man Died (2024), inspired by Wole Soyinka's 1972 memoir of the same name. The film has won numerous awards, namely, Best Director at the Africa Magic Viewers' Choice Awards 2025; Best Screenplay Award at the Carthage Film Festival, Tunis, and African International Film Festival, Lagos; Best Audience Choice Award at Eastern Nigeria International Film Festival; Best Film That Tackles an Important African Issue’ at the Luxor African Film Festival.

He has curated art exhibits globally namely, ReSignifications; Africa: See You, See Me. He is Vice Provost for the Arts, and Dean of Arts and Humanities at New York University Abu Dhabi.

=== Interviews ===
- "Awam Amkpa: What's Missing Will be Found", in Guernica Magazine, October 2024
- "Awam Amkpa: And So On", in Guernica Magazine, May 2025

=== Books ===
- Africa: See You, See Me. Edited catalogue, Africa.Cont, Lisboa. 2013
- ReSignifications: European Blackamoors, Africana Readings. Edited catalogue published by Postcart, Rome, Italy. 2016

=== Filmography ===
- Truly, Madly, Deeply, 1991 - a ghost.
- Director/Editor, Accra: A Pan-African Rupture 75 mins
- Director/Editor, A Very Very Short Story of Nollywood 15 mins. Produced by Manthia Diawara. 2008
- Director, Women of Agbogloshi, 12 mins- short documentary on Muslim women in Accra. 2007
- Director, Voices Against Aids, 5 mins. "Hip-Life" music video, shot and broadcast in Ghana for the West African Aids Federation. 2007
- Assistant Director, Conakry Kas, directed by Manthia Diawara. 2006
- Assistant Director, Bamako Sigi-Kan, directed by Manthia Diawara. 2005
- Director, Editor, Wazobia! Feature film written and produced by Tess Onwueme. 2005
- Director, The Man Died. Feature Film inspired by the prison memoir of Wole Soyinka, 2024.

"Awam Amkpa: What's Missing Will be Found", in Guernica Magazine, October 2024

=== Curatorial practices ===
- Africa: Significaciones at Centro Provincial de artes Plasticas y Diseño, Havana, Cuba. 2017
- ReSignifications: European Blackamoors, Africana Readings at Museo Bardini, Villa La Pietra and Galleria Biagiotti, Florence, Italy. 2015
- Africa: See You, See Me in Beijing and Macau China; Rome and Florence, Italy, Dakar, Senegal and Lagos, Nigeria. 2011–2013
- Annual Highlife Music Festival, Accra, Ghana. 2006–2009
- Kofi Ghanaba Audi-Visual Archives, Medie-Accra, Ghana 2007–2010
