= Of Africa =

2013 book by Wole Soyinka

- Author: Wole Soyinka
- Language: English
- Genre: Historical event
- Publisher: Yale University Press
- Publication date: November 12, 2012
- Publication place: Nigeria
- ISBN: 0-300-19833-7

Of Africa is a 2012 book by Wole Soyinka. The book was centered on Africa's culture, religion, history, imagination, and identity, examining how its past intertwines with that of others. He emphasizes Africa's intrinsic values, including its humanity, self-worth, and methods of environmental stewardship, encompassing both physical and intangible aspects. Despite acknowledging Africa's daunting challenges, Soyinka rejects defeatism, eloquently analyzing issues from historical significance to the rise of theocracy. He confronts complex topics like racial biases, inter-ethnic conflicts, and the impact of colonial-imposed borders on nationhood. Soyinka's examination reimagines Africa's place in the reader's mind, charting a path toward a future defined by peace and self-empowerment.

== Plot ==
The novel centres on a profound exploration of Africa's unique qualities and challenges, as pointed out by Wole Soyinka. Emphasizing the continent's intrinsic assets beyond material possessions, Soyinka highlights Africa's diverse ways of perceiving, responding, and relating, as well as its historical significance among its people. He emphasizes the importance of understanding Africa's humanity, self-worth, and environmental stewardship, suggesting that these are invaluable contributions to global well-being. Amidst discussions of Africa's negative attributes and external perceptions, Soyinka underscores the interconnectedness of Africa's past and present with the rest of the world. The narrative reflects on various encounters and perspectives on Africa, ranging from admiration to disdain, showcasing the diverse reactions and attitudes towards the continent. Through personal encounters and reflections, the plot navigates the complexities of African identity and challenges prevailing stereotypes.

== Language choice ==
The language choice used in this book could be described as academic, reflective, and informative, and there is also the use of flashbacks on African religion, culture, and rites. It utilizes formal language to convey complex ideas and concepts while maintaining a contemplative tone. The language is rich in descriptive imagery, telling an historical event and aiming to articulate the depth of Soyinka's exploration of Africa's qualities and challenges. Additionally, it incorporates a narrative style to discuss encounters and perspectives on Africa, emphasizing the diversity of reactions and attitudes towards the continent. Overall, the language choice serves to engage readers in a thoughtful examination of African identity and stereotypes.
