= From Zia with Love =

1992 play by Wole Soyinka

From Zia with love is a 1992 play written by Nigerian playwright, poet and author Wole Soyinka. The play was written based on the historical events that occurred in Nigeria due the military regime in 1980.

== Overview ==
Confusion and panic envelop a nation where the harshness and injustice of military authority is mocked by life behind bars when the military declares that a crime carrying a jail sentence now retrospectively warrants summary death.
