= Madmen and Specialists =

Play by Nigerian Playwright Wole Soyinka

- Original language: English
- Written by: Wole Soyinka
- Characters: Dr. Bero; Old Man; Mendicants; Si Bero; Iya Agba; Iya Mate
- Subject: Nigerian Civil War
- Setting: Dr. Bero's surgery and the space before it, Nigeria, 1969

Premiere
- Date: August 1, 1970
- Place: Eugene O'Neill Theater Center

Madmen and Specialists is a play by Wole Soyinka, conceived in 1970 during his imprisonment in the Nigerian Civil War. The play, Soyinka's eighth, has close links to the Theatre of the Absurd. Abiola Irele (in the Lagos Sunday Times) called it "a nightmarish image of our collective life as it appears to a detached and reflective consciousness". It was published in London 1971 by Methuen and in New York in 1972 by Hill & Wang.

== Overview ==
In Madmen and Specialists, Wole Soyinka explores the absurdity of the human condition amid war and political oppression. The play contrasts “madmen” and “specialists” to show how individuals are trapped in a society where rationality is detached from reality. Soyinka critiques authority and post-colonial politics, revealing how power dehumanizes people. Through absurd dialogues and actions, he highlights the futility of seeking meaning in a chaotic and violent system

Madmen and Specialists is considered Soyinka's most pessimistic play, dealing with "man's inhumanity and pervasive corruption in structures of power". The plot concerns Dr. Bero, a corrupt specialist, who imprisons and torments his physician father.

Soyinka uses the play to examine the complex interplay between history, psychology, and drama, portraying the moral decay, corruption, and human suffering caused by war. The narrative demonstrates how theatre can respond promptly to social issues, serving as a medium through which the playwright interprets and critiques the historical realities of his time. Madmen and Specialists is often analyzed alongside Soyinka’s memoir
