= The Trials of Brother Jero =

1998 play by Wole Soyinka

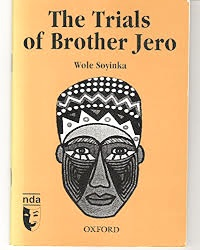
- Author: Wole Soyinka
- Language: English
- Publisher: Dramatist's Play Service
- Publication date: January 1, 1998
- ISBN: 978-0-822-21090-0

The Trials of Brother Jero is a satirical play by Nigerian playwright, poet, and Nobel Laureate Wole Soyinka. It explores themes of religious hypocrisy and social exploitation. The play, which was one of Soyinka's earliest works, premiered in 1960 in Ibadan, Nigeria, when Soyinka was 26 years old. Set against the backdrop of Lagos, it follows the exploits of Brother Jeroboam (Jero), an unscrupulous self proclaimed prophet who manipulates his followers for personal gain.

The play opens with Jero addressing the audience, revealing his opportunistic nature and his mastery of exploiting the desires and weaknesses of those around him. Despite his outward piety, Jero struggles with internal conflicts, including his own lust and ambition, while navigating challenges such as competition from other preachers and evading creditors. Central to the story are his interactions with Chume, his devoted but disillusioned follower, and Amope, Chume's strong willed wife, who seeks to settle a debt with Jero.

Through a sequence of comedic and ironic events, the play critiques the exploitation of religion for social and economic gain. It also highlights the gullibility of individuals who, driven by their aspirations and insecurities, fall prey to such exploitation. The Trials of Brother Jero, structured as a one act play with five scenes, masterfully blends humor with social commentary, cementing Soyinka's reputation as a keen observer of human behavior and societal dynamics.

== Plot ==
The play opens with Brother Jero, an evangelical prophet practicing on a Lagos beach, addressing the audience. He reveals his manipulative nature, confessing that he exploits the desires of his gullible followers for personal gain. Despite portraying himself as holy, Jero is embroiled in dishonesty and scheming. He reflects on his struggles, including rivalry with other preachers and the dwindling religious fervor of the public, many of whom prefer staying home to watch television.

In the first scene, Jero is interrupted by the Old Prophet, his former mentor, who chastises him for stealing his prime preaching spot and being ungrateful. Jero dismisses the Old Prophet's rebukes, showcasing his defiance.

The second scene introduces Chume, Jero's loyal follower, and his wife, Amope, a tax collector. Unbeknownst to Chume, Amope is attempting to collect a debt from Jero. A comedic encounter ensues as Jero tries to avoid them, fleeing his house when Amope becomes confrontational.

Jero then retreats to his church on the beach, boasting about his self-made success while privately grappling with his weaknesses, including his struggles to resist women. When Chume seeks Jero's permission to discipline his wife, Jero manipulates the situation to maintain control over Chume, only granting permission when it serves his interests.

As the day progresses, Jero strategizes to attract more followers, adopting the grand title The Immaculate Jero, Articulate Hero of Christ's Crusade. His congregation includes two government workers, whom he entices with false prophecies of career advancement.

The tension escalates when Chume discovers Jero's duplicity, realizing that the prophet has been manipulating him all along. Fueled by anger and betrayal, Chume decides to confront Jero.

In the final scene, Jero encounters a young politician practicing a speech. Seizing the opportunity, Jero convinces the politician to join his fold, claiming divine favor depends on his allegiance. Chume appears, armed with a dull sword, accompanied by Amope, seeking vengeance. Amid the chaos, Jero narrowly escapes, leaving the politician to believe he has witnessed a divine miracle.

The play concludes with Jero plotting his next move, vowing to label Chume as an agent of Satan and ensure his institutionalization, thereby securing his position as an untouchable spiritual leader. Through irony and humor, the play critiques the exploitation of religion and human gullibility.

== Characters ==
- Brother Jero (Jeroboam): The protagonist, an evangelical prophet practicing on a Lagos beach. He is manipulative, opportunistic, and deceitful, exploiting the gullibility of his followers for personal gain. Despite his outward piety, Jero struggles with his own flaws, including lust and ambition.
- Old Prophet: Jero's former mentor who confronts him for stealing his prime preaching spot and being ungrateful. His presence serves as a reminder of Jero's questionable rise to power.
- Chume: Jero's most loyal follower, a civil servant who seeks Jero's guidance on personal matters, including his tumultuous relationship with his wife. Chume becomes disillusioned with Jero upon realizing his manipulative nature.
- Amope: Chume's wife, a tax collector who despises Jero and seeks to collect a debt from him. She inadvertently exposes Jero's dishonesty through her relentless pursuit.
- Young Politician: A naive and ambitious figure who becomes a target of Jero's schemes. Jero manipulates him into believing his political success hinges on divine favor, securing him as a new follower.
- Other Followers: A collection of individuals, including two government workers, who represent the gullible masses that Jero exploits through false prophecies and spiritual manipulation.
