= The Man Died =

1972 memoir by Wole Soyinka

- Cover of first edition (1972)
- Author: Wole Soyinka
- Genre: Memoir
- Publication date: 1972

The Man Died: Prison Notes of Wole Soyinka is a 1972 memoir by Nigerian writer Wole Soyinka that explores his experiences in prison during the Nigerian Civil War. In 1984, a Nigerian court banned the book. In 2011, The Guardian included The Man Died in their list of the 100 greatest non-fiction books.

The book, along with Soyinka's You Must Set Forth at Dawn, provided the background of the documentary film Ebrohimie Road: A Museum of Memory, written by Nigerian writer and linguist Kola Tubosun about the period of Soyinka's arrest, detention, and the circumstances of his leaving the University of Ibadan for exile in 1972.

A film adaptation of the memoir was released in 2024. It was directed by Awam Amkpa and produced by Femi Odugbemi.
