= Three Crowns Books =

Publishing imprint for Africa and South Asia

Three Crowns Books was an imprint of Oxford University Press devoted to writing from the British colonies in Africa and South Asia. The series was active publishing for both the UK and international market from 1962 until 1976.

Notable authors whose works were published by this imprint include Wole Soyinka, Obi Egbuna, J. P. Clark, Ola Rotimi, and Barbara Kimenye.
