= Harmattan Haze on an African Spring =

2012 book by Wole Soyinka

- Author: Wole Soyinka
- Language: English
- Genre: Historical
- Publisher: Bookcraft Publishers
- Publication date: 2012
- Pages: 216
- ISBN: 978-9-788-13594-4

Harmattan Haze on an African Spring is a 2012 essay collection by Nigerian writer Wole Soyinka. The book is about Africa and their challenges; it also reflects the author's desire for a positive change in continent Africa.

== Plot ==
The book centers around the different ways in which Africa is seen, both as a concept and a tangible reality, It portrays the positive and negative reactions people have towards the African continent. Africa is seen as more than just a geographical location; it has a mix of aspirations, historical context, and memories.

The book acknowledges the abundant natural resources found in Africa and the way it serves as a source of desire for some and a source of fear for others, while addressing the wrong perception portrayed by various foreign explorers, writers, and thinkers who had no or little knowledge of the people and culture of the Africans.
