= Kongi's Harvest =

1965 play by Wole Soyinka

- Written by: Wole Soyinka

Premiere
- Date premiered: 1965
- Place premiered: Negro Arts Festival (Dakar)

Kongi's Harvest is a 1965 play written by Wole Soyinka. It premiered in Dakar, Senegal, at the first Negro Arts Festival in April 1966. It was later adapted as a film of the same name, directed by the American Ossie Davis.

The play was published in 1967 in London and New York by Oxford University Press (Three Crowns Books; 96 pp).

== Plot ==
President Kongi, the dictator of an African developing nation, is trying to modernize after deposing King Oba Danlola, who is being held in detention. Kongi demands that Danlola present him with a ceremonial yam at a state dinner to indicate his abdication. Daodu, Danlola's nephew and heir, grows prized yams on his farm.

Daodu's lover Segi owns a bar where Daodu spends most of his time. She is revealed to have been Kongi's former lover.

As the different tribes are resisting unification, Kongi tries to reach his goal by any means necessary, including forcing government officials to wear traditional African outfits and seeking advice from the man he deposed. In a climactic scene at the state dinner, Segi presents Kongi with the head of her father.
