= The Road (play) =

1965 play by Wole Soyinka

The Road is a 1965 play by Wole Soyinka, a Nigerian playwright, poet, and director. The play explores the activities at a roadside workshop, known as Aksident Store, where drivers discuss their experiences on the road.

== Plot ==
The plot revolves around Samson, a driver's assistant, and Salubi, a young driver without a license, who discuss their work experiences inside the store. Salubi works independently and only accepts individual passengers, while Samson is employed by Kotonu, who operates an unofficial bus converted from a truck. Kotonu and the professor join the conversation. Kotonu, who stopped driving after a serious accident, now works with the professor, who appears more of a religious enthusiast than a businessman, believing he can comfort the spirits of the deceased. He leaves with Kotonu to visit a collision scene.

The professor, who is not a clergyman, had previously preached in a church near the shop. Samson explains to Salubi why the professor left following a dispute with the bishop that resulted in a church wall collapsing. Samson convinces Kotonu to admit to helping the professor steal parts from the damaged cars to sell in the shop when he returns from the accident scene.

At Aksident Store, where the professor also sells palm wine, several unemployed drivers and assistants gather. These individuals have been united by Say-Tokyo-Kid to form a group that is hired to provide security or incite violence at political events. Particulars Joe, the local police officer, arrives to collect his bribes, and Chief-in-Town, the local politician, stops by to hire the group. Three men enter the shop looking for specific auto parts. When the professor arrives, Samson and Salubi ask him to copy a fake driver's license from Kotonu, who has since stopped driving. The professor initially refuses due to Salubi's disrespectful language but later changes his mind and agrees.
