= You Must Set Forth at Dawn =

2006 book by Wole Soyinka

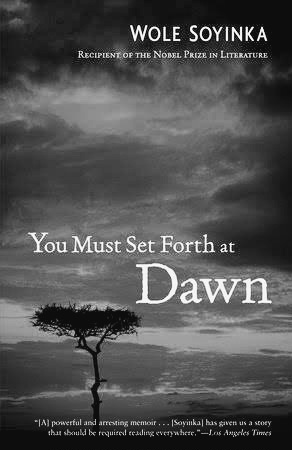
- Author: Wole Soyinka
- Language: English
- Publication date: April 11, 2006
- ISBN: 978-0-375-50365-8

You Must Set Forth at Dawn is an autobiographical work by the Nobel Prize-winning Nigerian playwright, poet and political activist Wole Soyinka. In this compelling memoir, Soyinka provides an intimate glimpse into his life as an adult, detailing his experiences in and out of Nigeria during some of the nation's most tumultuous periods. A sequel to his acclaimed childhood memoir, Ake: The Years of Childhood, this book captures Soyinka's struggles and triumphs as he navigates the complexities of political activism, exile, and his pioneering contributions to theater and literature.

Soyinka recounts his resistance to the oppressive military regimes that plagued Nigeria, particularly during the brutal reign of General Sani Abacha, which led to his exile. He intersperses these reflections with lighter anecdotes, such as his unexpected friendship with a Nigerian businessman and the humorous tale of smuggling a frozen wildcat into the United States for an authentic Nigerian barbecue.

More than a personal narrative, You Must Set Forth at Dawn serves as a vivid portrait of Nigeria itself, its enduring spirit, its challenges, and its hope. Soyinka's lyrical prose and unflinching honesty underscore his dual roles as a literary icon and an indefatigable advocate for justice and freedom. This memoir is both a testament to his profound commitment to democracy and a celebration of the resilience of his homeland.

== Plot ==
Wole Soyinka chronicles his adult years, weaving personal experiences with significant moments in Nigeria's political history. The memoir opens with Soyinka reflecting on the complexities of his homeland and his lifelong commitment to justice and freedom. Through evocative storytelling, he recounts the pivotal role he played in Nigeria's cultural and political evolution, highlighting the intersection of his personal struggles with the broader challenges faced by his nation.

The narrative focus on Soyinka's pioneering work in theater, where he broke conventions and used art as a tool for political resistance. Amid the turbulent landscape of post independence Nigeria, he actively opposed oppressive regimes, most notably the brutal dictatorship of General Sani Abacha. His outspoken criticism and activism eventually led to his exile, during which he continued to advocate for human rights and democracy.

Soyinka balances the gravity of his political activism with lighter, often humorous anecdotes, such as his improbable friendship with a prominent Nigerian businessman and the escapade of smuggling a frozen wildcat into the United States to share the taste of Nigeria with his students.

The memoir also explores Soyinka's connections with family and friends, who served as his anchors during periods of hardship and uncertainty. Through their stories, he paints a vivid portrait of Nigeria's resilience and indomitable spirit, even amidst chaos and tyranny.

As Soyinka reflects on his public and private life, he presents You Must Set Forth at Dawn as more than a personal account. It is a meditation on justice, tyranny, and the enduring hope of a nation, as well as a testament to his unwavering dedication to his homeland and the principles of democracy and freedom.

== Language Choice ==
Soyinka combines lyrical prose with direct and engaging storytelling. His rich descriptions bring Nigeria's cultural and political landscape to life, while his use of humor and irony adds balance to the memoir's serious themes. Soyinka's language reflects his dual identity as a literary figure and political activist, blending poetic imagery with incisive commentary. The narrative is accessible yet intellectually rigorous, offering a compelling insight into both Soyinka's life and Nigeria's struggles for justice and freedom.
