= A Dance of the Forests =

Play by Wole Soyinka

- Original language: English
- Written by: Wole Soyinka
- Chorus: Demoke
- Characters: Adenebi: Agboreko; Dead Man; Eshuoro; Rola
- Mute: Ogun: Eshuoro; Forest Spirits
- Subject: Yoruba culture Nigerian history
- Genre: drama
- Setting: Nigeria

Premiere
- Date: 1960
- Place: Ibadan, Nigeria

A Dance of the Forests is a play by Nigerian playwright Wole Soyinka. It was written and first performed in 1960 as part of the national celebrations for the independence of Nigeria. It explores the themes of tradition, history, and the challenges of postcolonial Africa. The play was published in London and New York in 1963 by Oxford University Press.

A Dance of the Forests criticises the political system of postcolonial Africa in particular, British Nigeria. Soyinka being against Negritude movement, he was against the over glorification of pre-colonial Nigeria and Africa at large. A Dance of the Forests was written to address such issues, illustrating that precolonial Africa, needs to change their deeds as it affect their whole life time. He uses dead characters and flashbacks to illustrate this. At the time of its release, it was an iconoclastic work that angered many of the elite in Soyinka's native Nigeria. Politicians were particularly incensed at Soyinka's prescient portrayal of post-colonial Nigerian politics as aimless and corrupt. Despite the deluge of criticism, the play remains an influential work. In it, Soyinka espouses a unique vision for a new Africa, one that is able to forge a new identity free from the influence of European imperialism.

A Dance of the Forests is regarded as Soyinka's theatrical debut and has been considered the most complex and difficult to understand of his plays. Soyinka unveils the rotten aspects of society and demonstrates that the past is no better than the present when it comes to the seamy side of life. He lays bare the fabric of Nigerian society and warns people that they are on the brink of a new stage in their history: independence.
