= Aké: The Years of Childhood =

1981 memoir by Nigerian writer Wole Soyinka

- Cover of Vintage paperback edition
- Author: Wole Soyinka
- Language: English
- Genre: Autobiography
- Publisher: Rex Collings (UK); Random House (US)
- Publication date: 1981
- Publication place: United States
- Pages: 230
- Awards: Anisfield-Wolf Award (1983)
- ISBN: 9780394528076
- OCLC: 8627603

American first edition cover.

Aké: The Years of Childhood is a 1981 memoir by Nigerian writer Wole Soyinka.

== Background ==
It tells the story of Soyinka's boyhood before and during World War II in a Yoruba village in western Nigeria called Aké, where the author spent the first 12 years of his life, before moving in 1946 to the Government College in Ibadan.

== Reception ==
When the book was first published, The New York Times reviewer wrote:

Playwright, poet, novelist, polemical essayist and now autobiographer, Mr. Soyinka is unquestionably Africa's most versatile writer and arguably her finest. In Ake he has produced an account of his childhood as a Yoruba in western Nigeria that is destined to become a classic of African autobiography, indeed a classic of childhood memoirs wherever and whenever produced....Through recollection, restoration and re-creation, he conveys a personal vision that was formed by the childhood world that he now returns to evoke and exalt in his autobiography. This is the ideal circle of autobiography at its best. It is what makes Ake, in addition to its other great virtues, the best available introduction to the work of one of the liveliest, most exciting writers in the world today.

In The Boston Phoenix, Carolyn Clay said of Soyinka:

few who have lingered longer in youth’s cradling glade have evoked it so well, re-creating the sounds and smells and breadth of everyday. And Soyinka does not, like so many autobiographers, write from the smug perspective of the adult looking back, explaining and commenting and filling in gaps; rather, he captures the world as it must have seemed, in all its enchantment and perplexity, to the boy who was there.

Aké: The Years of Childhood was awarded an Anisfield-Wolf Award in 1983.

Other autobiographical writings by Soyinka include The Man Died (1972), Isara: A Voyage Around "Essay" (1989), Ibadan: The "Penkelemes" Years, A Memoir, 1946–1965 (1994), and You Must Set Forth at Dawn (2006).

== Adaptations ==
In 1995, BBC Radio 4 broadcast a 10-part abridgement (by Margaret Busby) in the Book at Bedtime series, read by Colin McFarlane and produced by Sally Avens.
