= The Lion and the Jewel =

1959 play by Nigerian writer Wole Soyinka

The Lion and the Jewel is a play by Nigerian writer Wole Soyinka that was first performed in 1959 in Ibadan. In 1966, it was staged in London, England, at the Royal Court Theatre.

The play chronicles how Baroka, the lion, fights with the modern Lakunle over the right to marry Sidi, the titular Jewel. Lakunle is portrayed as the civilized antithesis of Baroka and unilaterally attempts to modernize his community and change its social conventions for no reason other than the fact that he can. This is a parody of the westernized elite that inherited power from the colonists upon Independence in Africa.

The playscript was first published in 1962 by Oxford University Press. Soyinka emphasises the theme of the corrupted African culture through the play, as well as how the youth should embrace the original African culture. A review by Naijabanquet describes The Lion and the Jewel as "a masterpiece that successfully combines the concept of literature as a tool both for socio-cultural activism and shining spotlight on aesthetics."

== Characters ==
Main characters

- Baroka – The Baale or viceroyal chieftain of Ilujinle, a Yoruba village in the realm of the Ibadan clan's kingdom. A crafty individual, he is the Lion referred to in the title. At 62 years of age, he has already sired 63 children, thanks to polygamy, and still wants to woo Sidi, the Jewel.
- Lakunle – The progressive and absurdly arrogant Westernised teacher. He is in his twenties. He appears to only be semi-literate.
- Sidi – A beautiful but somewhat egotistical village girl who is wooed by both Baroka and Lakunle. She is also the village belle; thus she is the titular Jewel.
- Sadiku – The chief's sly senior wife, head of his harem.
- Ailatu – Baroka's favourite, who loses her place in his affections due to her jealousy of Sidi.

Supporting characters

- The Surveyor - an outsider who plans to construct a road through the village.

== Plot ==
The play takes place over a Sunday. It is divided into three parts: morning, noon, and night.

=== Morning ===
The play opens with a teacher, Lakunle, who is teaching when Sidi walks past carrying a pail of water. The teacher peers through the window and disappears. Lakunle comes out and insists on taking the pail from Sidi's head. She refuses, saying that she would look silly. Lakunle discouraged her to carry loads on her head or else her neck will be shortened. He also tells her not to expose so much of her cleavage with the cloth she wears around her breasts. Sidi says that it is too inconvenient for her to do so. She scolds him, saying that the village thinks he's crazy, but Lakunle says that he is not so easily cowed by taunts. Lakunle also insults her saying that her brain is smaller than his because of her feminine gender (which proves his semi-literacy, mentioned at first), making her angry.

After arguing, Sidi wants to leave, but Lakunle tells her of his love for her, but she remains indifferent. Eventually, it is revealed that Sidi does not want to marry him because Lakunle refuses to pay her bride-price as it is uncivilized, outrageous custom. Sidi tells him that if she did so, it could imply that she was not a virgin. Lakunle further professes how he wants to marry her and treat her "just like the Lagos couples he had seen". Sidi doesn't care. She also says that she finds the Western custom of kissing repulsive. She tells him that not paying her bride price was mean and miserly.

Soon, a village girl came to announce to Sidi the arrival of the stranger and the photo album he brought along bearing pictures of the village. As the village girls enter, they play "The Dance of the Lost Traveller", which features the sudden arrival of a photographer in their midst some time ago. They tease the traveller in the play, calling his motorbike "the devil's own horse" and the camera that he used to take pictures "the one-eyed box". Four girls act the "devil-horse", a youth is selected to play the snake, and Lakunle becomes the Traveller. He seeks to be excused to teach Primary Four Geography but Sidi informs him that the village is on holiday due to the arrival of the photographer/traveller.

We also find out that the photographer made a picture book about the village based on the photos he took. There is a picture of Sidi on the front page, and a two-page spread of her somewhere inside. Baroka is featured too, but he "is in a little corner somewhere in the book, and that corner he shares with one of the wall on village latrines". They banter about for a while, Lakunle gave in and participated because he couldn't tolerate being taunted by them.

The Dance of the Lost Traveller
The four girls kneeled on the ground, forming the wheels of the car. Lakunle adjusts their position and sits in air in the middle. He pretends to drive the "car". The girls dance the stall. They shudder, and drop their faces onto their laps. He pretends to try to restart the "car". He gets out and checks the "wheels" and also pinches them. He tries to start the "car", fails and takes his things for a trek.

He hears a girl misbehaving, but attributes it to sunstroke, so he throws the bottle that he was drinking from in that general direction. He hears a scream and a torrent of abuse. He takes a closer look and sees a girl (played by Sidi). He tries to take photos, but falls down into the stream.

The cast assembles behind him, pretending to be villagers in an ugly mood hauling him to the maram in the town centre. Then Baroka appears and the play stops. He talks to Lakunle for a while, saying that he knew how the play went and was waiting for the right time to step in. He drops subtle hints of an existing feud between him and Lakunle, then makes the play continue. The villagers once again start thirsting for his blood. He is hauled before Baroka, thrown on his face. He tries to explain his plight. Baroka seems to understand and orders a feast in the Lost Traveller's honour. He then takes the opportunity to take more photos of Sidi. He is also pressed to drink much alcohol, and at the end of the play, he is close to vomiting.

The play ends. Sidi praises him for his performance. Lakunle runs away, followed by a flock of women. Baroka and the wrestler sit alone. Baroka takes out his book, and muses that it has been five full months since he last took a wife.

=== Noon ===
Sidi is at a road near the marketplace. Lakunle follows her, while carrying the firewood that Sidi asked him to help her get. She admires the pictures of her in the magazine. Then Sadiku appears wearing a shawl over her head. She informs her that the Lion (Baroka) wishes to take her as a wife. Lakunle is outraged, but Sidi stops him. Lakunle changes tactics, telling her as his lover to ignore the message. Sadiku took that as a yes, but Sidi dashed her hopes, saying that since her fame had spread to Lagos and the rest of the world, she deserves more than that. Sadiku presses on, dissembling that Baroka has sworn not to take any more wives after her and that she would be his favourite and would get many privileges, including being able to sleep in the palace rather than one of the outhouses. As Baroka's last wife, she would also be able to become the first, and thus head wife, of his successor, in the same way that Sadiku was Baroka's head wife. However, Sidi sees through her lies, and tells her that she knew that he just wanted fame "as the one man who has possessed 'the jewel of Ilujinle'". Sadiku is flabbergasted, she insults and attempts to hit Lakunle for what he has done to Sidi.

Sidi shows the magazine. She says that in the picture, she looks absolutely beautiful while he simply looks like a ragged, blackened piece of saddle leather: she is youthful but he is spent. Sadiku changes techniques, saying that if Sidi does not want to be his wife, will she be kind enough to attend a small feast in her honour at his house that night. Sidi refuses, saying that she knows that every woman who has eaten supper with him eventually becomes his wife. Lakunle interjects, informing them that Baroka was known for his wiliness, particularly when he managed to foil the Public Works attempt to build a railroad through Ilujinle. Baroka bribed the surveyor for the route to move the railroad much farther away as "the earth is most unsuitable, could not possibly support the weight of a railway engine". Lakunle is distraught, as he thinks just how close Ilujinle was to civilisation at that time.

The scene cuts to Baroka's bedroom. Ailatu is plucking his armpit hairs. There is a strange machine with a long lever at the side. It is covered with animal skins and rugs. Baroka mentions that she is too soft with her pulls. Then he tells her that he plans to take a new wife, but that he would let her be the "sole out-puller of my sweat-bathed hairs". She is angry, and deliberately plucks the next few hairs a lot harder. Sadiku enters. He shoos Ailatu away, lamenting about his bleeding armpit.

Sadiku informs him that she failed to woo Sidi. She told him that Sidi flatly refused her order, claiming that he was far too old. Baroka pretends to doubt his manliness and asks Sadiku to massage the soles of his feet. Sadiku complies. He lies to her that his manhood ended a week ago, specifically warning her not to tell anyone. He comments that he is only 62. Compared to him, his grandfather had fathered two sons late on 65 and Okiki, his father, produced a pair of female twins at 67. Finally Baroka falls asleep.

=== Night ===
Sidi is at the village center square, by the schoolroom window. Enter Sadiku, who is carrying a bundle. She sets down a figure by the tree. She gloats, saying that she has managed to be the undoing (making him impotent) of Baroka, and of his father, Okiki, before that. Sidi is amazed at what she initially perceives to be Sadiku going mad. She shuts the window and exits, shocking Sadiku. After a pause, Sadiku resumes her victory dance and even asks Sidi to join in. Then Lakunle enters. He scorns them, saying: "The full moon is not yet, but the women cannot wait. They must go mad without it." Sidi and Sadiku stop dancing. They talk for a while. As they are about to resume dancing, Sidi states her plans to visit Baroka for his feast and toy with him. Lakunle tries in vain to stop her, telling her that if her deception were to be discovered she would be beaten up. Sidi leaves. Lakunle and Sadiku converse. Lakunle states his grand plans to modernize the area by abolishing the bride-price, building a motor-road through the town and bring city ways to isolated Ilujinle. He goes on to spurn her, calling her a bride-collector for Baroka.

The scene is now Baroka's bedroom. Baroka is arm-wrestling the wrestler seen earlier. He is surprised that she (Sidi) managed to enter unchallenged. Then he suddenly remembers that that day was the designated day off for the servants. He laments that Lakunle had made his servants form an entity called the Palace Workers' Union. He asks if Ailatu was at her usual place, and was disappointed to find out that she had not left him yet despite scolding her severely. Then Sidi mentions that she was here for the supper. Sidi starts playing around with Baroka. She asks him what was up between him and Ailatu. He is annoyed. Changing the subject, Sidi says that she thinks Baroka will win the ongoing arm-wrestling match. Baroka responds humbly, complimenting the strength and ability of the wrestler. She slowly teases Baroka, asking if he was planning to take a wife. She draws an example, asking if he was her father, would he let her marry a person like him?

Sidi takes this opportunity to slightly tease him, and is rewarded by his violent reaction by taking the wrestler and slinging him over his shoulder. The wrestler quickly recovers and a new match begins again. The discussion continues. Baroka is hurt by the parallels and subtle hints about his nature dropped by Sidi. Sidi even taunts him, saying that he has failed to produce any children for the last two years. Eventually he is so angered that he slams the wrestler's arm down on the table, winning the match. He tells the defeated wrestler to get the fresh gourd by the door. In the meantime, Baroka tries to paint himself as a grumpy old man with few chances to show his kindliness. The wrestler returns. Baroka continues with his self-glorification. Then he shows her the now-familiar magazine and an addressed envelope. He shows her a stamp, featuring her likeness, and tells her that her picture would adorn the official stamp of the village. The machine at the side of his room is also revealed to be a machine to produce stamps. As she admires the pictures of her in the magazine, Baroka happens to mention that he does not hate progress, only its nature which made "all roofs and faces look the same". He continues praising Sidi's looks, appealing to her.

The scene cuts back to the village centre, where Lakunle is pacing in frustration. He is mad at Sadiku for tricking her to go see Baroka, and at the same time concerned that Baroka will harm or imprison her. Some mummers arrive. Sadiku remains calm, despite Lakunle's growing stress. Sadiku steals a coin from Lakunle to pay the mummers. In return, the mummers drum her praises, but Sadiku claims that Lakunle was the real benefactor. Then they dance the Baroka story, showing him at his prime and his eventual downfall. Lakunle is pleased by the parts where they mock Baroka. Sadiku mentions that she used to be known as Sadiku of the duiker's feet because she could twist and untwist her waist with the smoothness of a water snake.

Sidi appears. She is distraught. Lakunle is outraged, and plans to bring the case to court. Sidi reveals that Baroka only told her at the end that it was a trap. Baroka said that he knew that Sadiku would not keep it to herself, and go out and mock his pride. Lakunle is overcome with emotion, and after at first expressing deep despair, he offers to marry her instead, with no bride-price since she is not a virgin after all. Lakunle is pleased that things have gone as he hoped. Sadiku tells him that Sidi is preparing for a wedding. Lakunle is very happy, saying he needs a day or two to get things ready for a proper Christian wedding. Then musicians appear. Sidi appears, bearing a gift. She tells Lakunle that he is invited to her wedding. Lakunle hopes that the wedding will be between Sidi and himself, but she informs him that she has no intention of marrying him, but rather will marry Baroka. Lakunle is stunned. Sidi says that between Baroka and him, at sixty, Baroka is still full of life but Lakunle would be probably "ten years dead". Sadiku then gives Sidi her blessing. The marriage ceremony continues. A young girl taunts Lakunle, and he gives chase. Sadiku gets in his way. He frees himself and clears a space in the crowd for them both to dance.

The drama ends.

== Themes ==
The prominent theme of this story is the rapid modernisation of Africa, coupled with the rapid evangelisation of the population. This has driven a wedge between the traditionalists, who seek to nullify the changes done in the name of progress due to vested interests or simply not liking the result of progress, and the modernists, who want to see the last of what they believe to be outdated traditional beliefs at all cost.

Another core theme is the marginalisation of women as property. Traditionally, they were seen as entities that could be bought, sold or accumulated. Even the ostensibly modern Lakunle falls victim to this, by looking down on Sidi for having a smaller brain, and later by thinking it will be easier to marry her once she's lost her virginity, since no dowry was required in such a situation.

There is also the conflict between education and traditional beliefs. The educated people seek to spread their knowledge to the tribal people in an attempt to make them more modern. This in turn is resisted by the tribal people, who see no point in obtaining an education as it served them no use in their daily lives.This theme is also displayed in the story when Lakunle tries to teach Sidi how to use cutlery.

Finally, there is the importance of song and dance as a form of spreading information in a world where the fastest route of communication is by foot. It is also an important source of entertainment for the otherwise bored village youths. The author shows the slow influence of modernisation, for example, the wandering traveller influences Sidi's life drastically. More specifically, Sidi's romantic future is tied to the outcome of a struggle between two opposing factions.

Enact the visit of the white photographer, and the seduction of the village jewel Sidi by the old Lion of a chief, are two of the pinnacles of Mr. Soyinka's achievement to date."

- African Forum: "The contemporary theater seems to have forgotten that it has its roots in ritual and song, and it is only the rare emergence of a Lorca or a Brecht-or a Wole Soyinka-that recreates an awareness of our deprivation."
- West Africa: "...a brilliant dramatist-the most important in Nigeria, if not in all of Black Africa. He is helped by a profound command of the English language, reflected sometimes in the dazzling brilliance, at other times in the intense poetic quality of his writing...."
- The Times Educational Supplement: "He does not use the culture of his ancestors as a gimmick to sell his abilities or even as an export commodity, but as inborn material for expansion. His skilful use of idiom with the lively and musical Nigerian flavour in no way detracts from the command of the English language which he possesses."
- The Times, at the time of the play's production at the Royal Court Theatre, London, in December 1966: "This is the third play by Wole Soyinka to appear in London since last year, and this work alone is enough to establish Nigeria as the most fertile new source of English-speaking drama since Synge's discovery of the Western Isles.... Even this comparison does Soyinka less than justice, for he is dealing not only with rich folk material, but with the impact of the modern on tribal custom: to find any parallel for his work in English drama, you have to go back to the Elizabethans."
- Naija Banquet: "The Lion and the Jewel is a masterpiece that successfully combines the concept of literature as a tool both for socio-cultural activism and shining spotlight on aesthetics."
