= The Bacchae of Euripides =

Stage play

The Bacchae of Euripides: A Communion Rite is an adaptation by Wole Soyinka of the ancient Greek tragedy The Bacchae by Euripides.

Soyinka wrote the play during his exile in Britain. It was first performed on 2 August 1973 by the National Theatre company at the Old Vic in London.

== Differences from The Bacchae ==
Soyinka adds a second chorus to the play, the slaves, to mirror the civil unrest in Nigeria.

The ending of the play is much different. Instead of Thebes dissolving into chaos, Pentheus's head begins to spurt blood, that transforms into wine. In Soyinka's introduction, he says, “By drinking the king’s blood, the community as a whole partakes of his power and all are revitalized and unified.” This is what makes the play fulfil its subtitle of A Communion Rite. The sacrifice of the king, similar to Death and the King's Horseman, comes from Soyinka's Yoruba heritage.

== National Theatre performance ==
Soyinka's production note called for "as [racially] mixed a cast as is possible" for the Slaves and the Bacchantes, and a "fully negroid" actor for the Slave Leader, but in the National Theatre's production all the other named characters were played by white actors. Martin Shaw, as Dionysus, was not an androgynous figure. Bare-chested and in a small loincloth, with only slightly longer hair than one might then have expected from one's bank manager, he was a clearly male leader of rebellion; the chorus of maenads became a predominantly male chorus of slaves, only some of whom were female. Whereas in Euripides' play Pentheus is a young man (cousin, and potential mirror image of Dionysus), in this production John Shrapnel seemed old enough to be a father figure, and thereby a generational difference was introduced.
