= The Interpreters (novel) =

1965 novel by Wole Soyinka

- Author: Wole Soyinka
- Language: English
- Publisher: André Deutsch
- Publication date: 1965
- Media type: Print
- Pages: 253

The Interpreters is a novel by Nigerian writer Wole Soyinka, first published in London by André Deutsch in 1965 and later republished as part of the influential Heinemann African Writers Series. It is the first of only three novels written by Soyinka; he is principally known as a playwright. The novel was written in English and later translated into a number of languages.

== Plot ==
The novel is set in the 1960s, in post-independence and pre-civil war Nigeria, mainly in Lagos. There are five main characters in the novel: the foreign ministry clerk Egbo, the university professor Bandele, the journalist Sagoe, the engineer turned sculptor Sekoni, and the artist Kola. They were friends at high school, then went abroad to study, and returned to start middle-class jobs in Nigeria.

== Style ==
The narrative of The Interpreters appears chaotic, with Soyinka employing a non-linear storytelling approach, frequently revisiting past events. As a result, understanding the main characters, particularly Egbo and Sagoe, requires close attention and effort. Many other characters (university professors, editor board of the newspaper where Sagoe works at) are given schematically, fully conforming to the prevailing stereotypes of the era. The novel was published in the 1960s, shortly after many of the African states became independent, and Soyinka tried to build his narrative in order to oppose the stereotypes that were generally included in a post-colonial novel. The structure of the narrative also ultimately forms a comment on the events that occur in the lives of several characters.

== Reception ==
Thomas Lask, writing for The New York Times, took issue with the "diffuse" construction of the novel. However, his review was positive, praising the combination of "esthetic and political problems". The novel has been referred to as "difficult" and as "never having received the attention it deserved".
