= Rex Collings =

English publisher

Gustav Rex Collings (18 June 1925 – 23 May 1996) was an English publisher who specialized in books relating to Africa and children's books. He ensured the publication of Wole Soyinka's plays, and was the first to publish Watership Down (1972) by Richard Adams.

Collings started at Penguin before moving to Oxford University Press, where he established the Three Crowns Series for books on African subjects. He then moved to Methuen before setting up his own publishing company, Rex Collings Ltd. He risked his own money in publishing Watership Down, which around thirty publishers had turned down.

He was the Liberal Party candidate for Portsmouth Langstone constituency at the 1964 general election and North Norfolk in 1979.
