= Season of Anomy =

1973 novel by Wole Soyinka

- Original cover
- Author: Wole Soyinka
- Language: English
- Genre: Satire
- Publication date: 1973
- Publication place: Nigeria
- Media type: Print (Paperback)
- Pages: 336
- Preceded by: The Interpreters

Season of Anomy is the second novel by Nobel winning Nigerian playwright and critic Wole Soyinka. Published in 1973, it is one of only three novels published during Soyinka's highly productive literary career. Though highly studied as part of Soyinka's importance to the African literary canon, criticism of the novel has been mixed, with some critics describing the novel as a "failure".

== Plot ==
The book intertwines an African nation's struggle for independence with a tragic love story. When Ofeyi is sent on an advertising campaign for his unnamed country, he arrives in a seaside community that has long been isolated from the corrupt national government due to its remote location. The meeting of Ofeyi and Aiyeru, on the other hand, will have far-reaching implications. Uneasy in a westernized Africa and frustrated with his corporate job, Ofeyi presents to Aiyeru rebellious ideas about farming and, subsequently, revolutionary ideas for improving the entire community.

== Themes ==
The novel explores "the role of individual will as the agent of social transformation", looking at the actions taken by each of the four main characters in changing the corrupt Nigerian society. Marxist critic Aisha Karim describes this as a theme similar to his other novel The Interpreters. Other critics explore other post-colonial social and ethnographic dynamics explored by the novel. For example, critic Joseph Obi describes the novel as a "definitive reading of the militarized state in Africa".

Critic Obi Maduakor calls the novel an "intensely religious book," preoccupied with "moral issues". For Maduakor, the novel revolves around social reformer Ofeyi's quest to find moral and ethical solutions to inequalities, and often these ideal solutions are found in natural or agricultural settings.
