= Wole Soyinka =

Nigerian playwright, poet and novelist

Wole Soyinka GCON
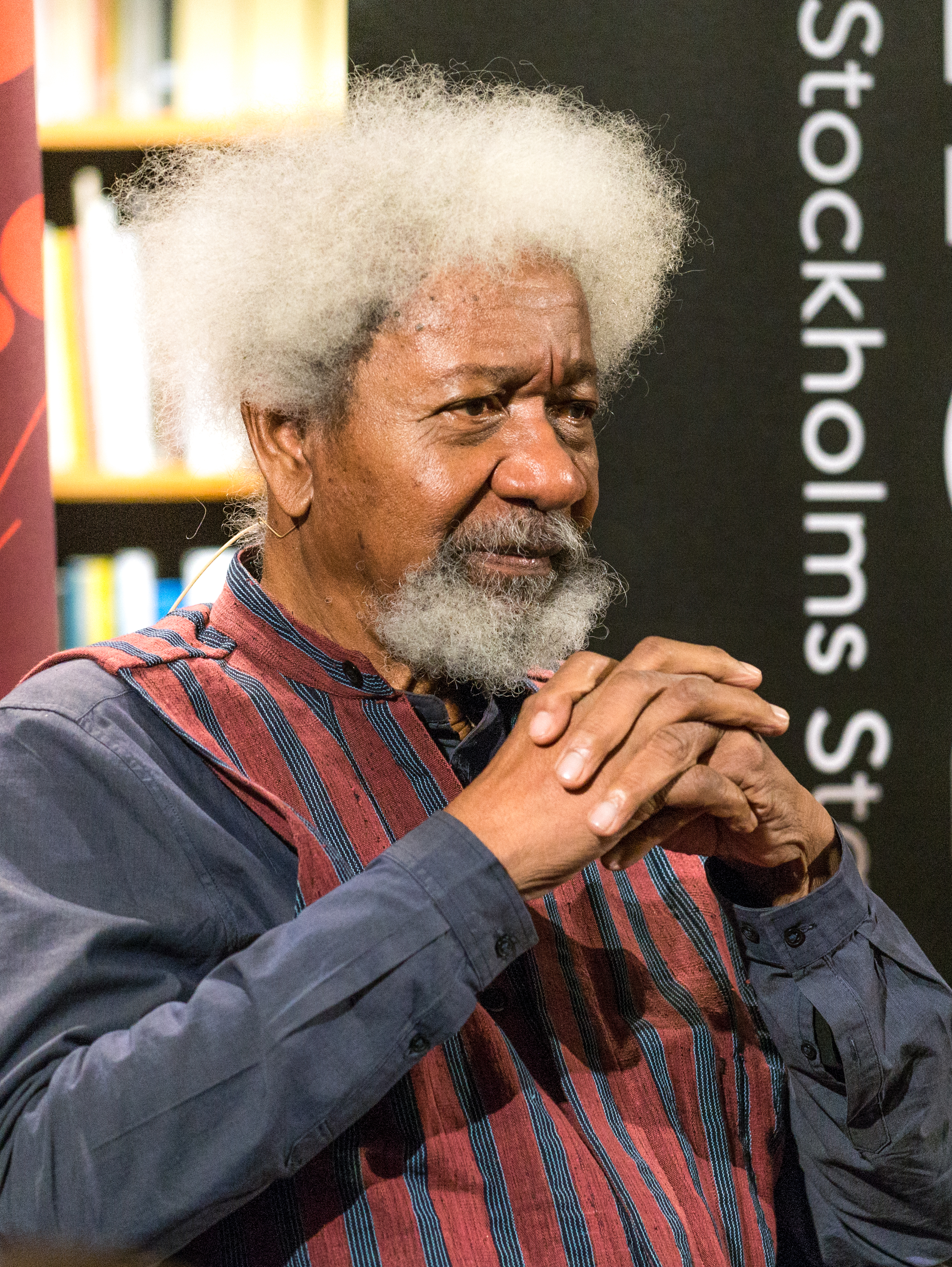
- Soyinka in 2018
- Born: Akinwande Oluwole Babatunde Soyinka; 13 July 1934 (age 92); Abeokuta, British Nigeria
- Citizenship: Nigerian
- Education: University College Ibadan; University of Leeds (BA)
- Occupations: Playwright; poet; novelist
- Spouses: Barbara Dixon (m. 1958; div. 1963) Olaide Idowu (m. 1963; div. 1989) Folake Doherty (m. 1989)
- Children: 8, including Olaokun
- Relatives: Ransome-Kuti family
- Writing career
- Period: 1950–present
- Genres: Dramatic comedy; tragedy
- Notable awards: Full list
- Website: wolesoyinka.online

Akinwande Oluwole Babatunde Soyinka (born 13 July 1934) is a Nigerian writer, playwright, and poet. He has written three novels, ten collections of short stories, seven poetry collections, twenty-five plays and five memoirs. He has also written two translated works and many articles and short stories for newspapers and periodicals. He was awarded the 1986 Nobel Prize in Literature for his "wide cultural perspective and poetic overtones fashioning the drama of existence".

Born into an Anglican Yoruba family in Aké, Abeokuta, Soyinka had a preparatory education at Government College, Ibadan, and proceeded to the University College Ibadan. During his education, he co-founded the Pyrate Confraternity. Soyinka left Nigeria for England to study at the University of Leeds. During that period, he was the editor of the university's magazine, The Eagle, before becoming a full-time author in the 1950s. In the UK, he started writing short stories and making records for the BBC Lecture series. He wrote many plays which were performed on radios and in theatres in Nigeria and the UK, especially the Royal Court Theatre.

Many of Soyinka's novels and plays are set in Nigeria, reflecting the country's history, culture, and political struggles. Alongside these works, he has produced a wide range of satirical writings that have reached a broad audience and enjoyed considerable popularity. He is also an accomplished poet, with numerous individual poems and several published collections to his name. He has achieved success with his plays, including The Swamp Dwellers (1958), The Lion and the Jewel (1959), and The Invention (1957), an early play produced at the Royal Court Theatre. Soyinka has written a number of other works, including The Interpreters (1965), Season of Anomy (1973), Death and the King's Horseman, Chronicles from the Land of the Happiest People on Earth (2021), and Harmattan Haze on an African Spring (2012). In July 2024, Bola Tinubu renamed the National Arts Theatre after Soyinka during his 90th birthday.

== Early life and education ==
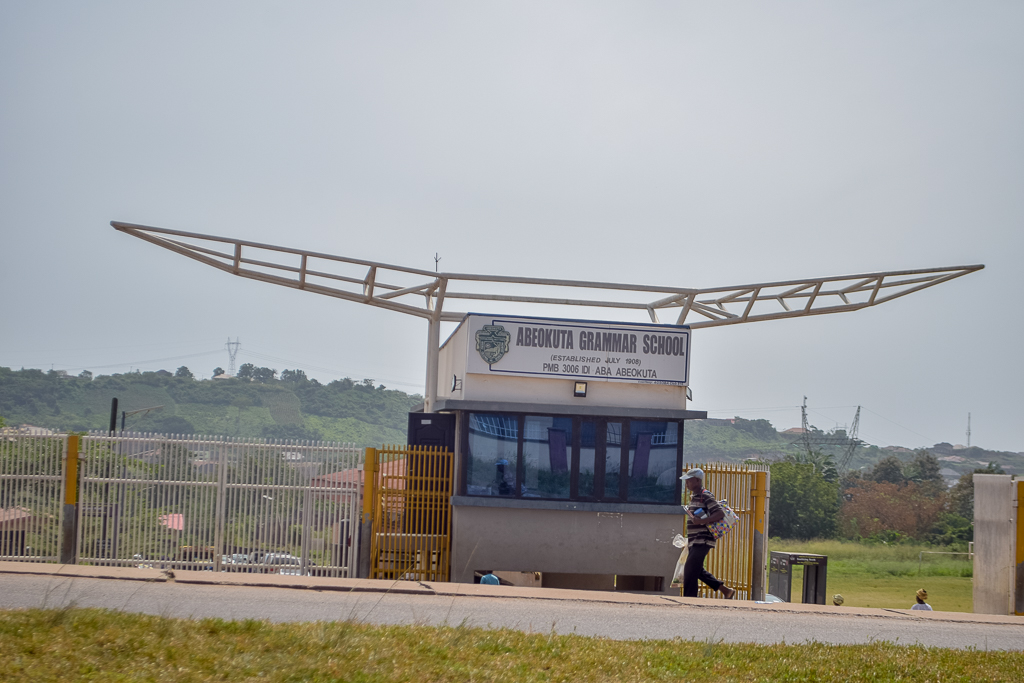
Abeokuta Grammar School, where Soyinka had his secondary education

Soyinka was born on 13 July 1934 in Ake, Abeokuta, Nigeria into a Christian family of Yoruba descent. He was the second out of seven children (Note: His siblings are Atinuke Aina, Femi, Yeside, Omofolabo Ajayi, and Kayode.) of Samuel Ayodele Soyinka, an Anglican minister and headmaster from the royal family of Isara-Remo and Grace Soyinka (née Jenkins-Harrison), a shopkeeper and activist from the Ransome-Kuti family.

His mother Grace's extended family, the Ransome-Kutis, were a powerful Nigerian dynasty that has been described as Nigeria's answer to the Kennedy family in the United States. Their founding patriarch, the Anglican priest J. J. Ransome-Kuti, was a pioneering figure in his country's music recording industry in the 1920s.

From 1940 to 1946, Soyinka attended St. Peters Primary School, where his father was the headmaster. He had his secondary education at Abeokuta Grammar School and his university preparatory studies at Government College, Ibadan from 1946 to 1951. He was admitted into the University College Ibadan, where he studied English literature, Greek, and Western history from 1952 to 1954. During his final years in the university, he wrote a short radio play, Keffi's Birthday Treat, which was broadcast in July 1954 by the Federal Radio Corporation of Nigeria. Along with his classmates including Olumuyiwa Awẹ, Ralph Opara, Aig-Imoukhuede, and Pius Oleghe, he founded the National Association of Seadogs, the first confraternity in Nigeria.

Soyinka relocated from Nigeria to England in 1954 to continue his studies in English literature at the University of Leeds under the supervision of G. Wilson Knight. The decision to study abroad at that time when master's degree study was not available in Ibadan was through Joyce M. Green, an English woman who joined the University College, Ibadan from Cambridge in 1950, and who had been one of Soyinka's teachers and had provided him with a well-worded reference to Leeds. At Leeds University, he served as the editor of the university's satirical magazine, The Eagle, in which he wrote a column on academic life. In August 1955, he started recording for BBC Lecture and wrote many short stories. In 1957, he won the annual oratory competition run by the University.

== Career ==
=== 1957–1967: Early career ===
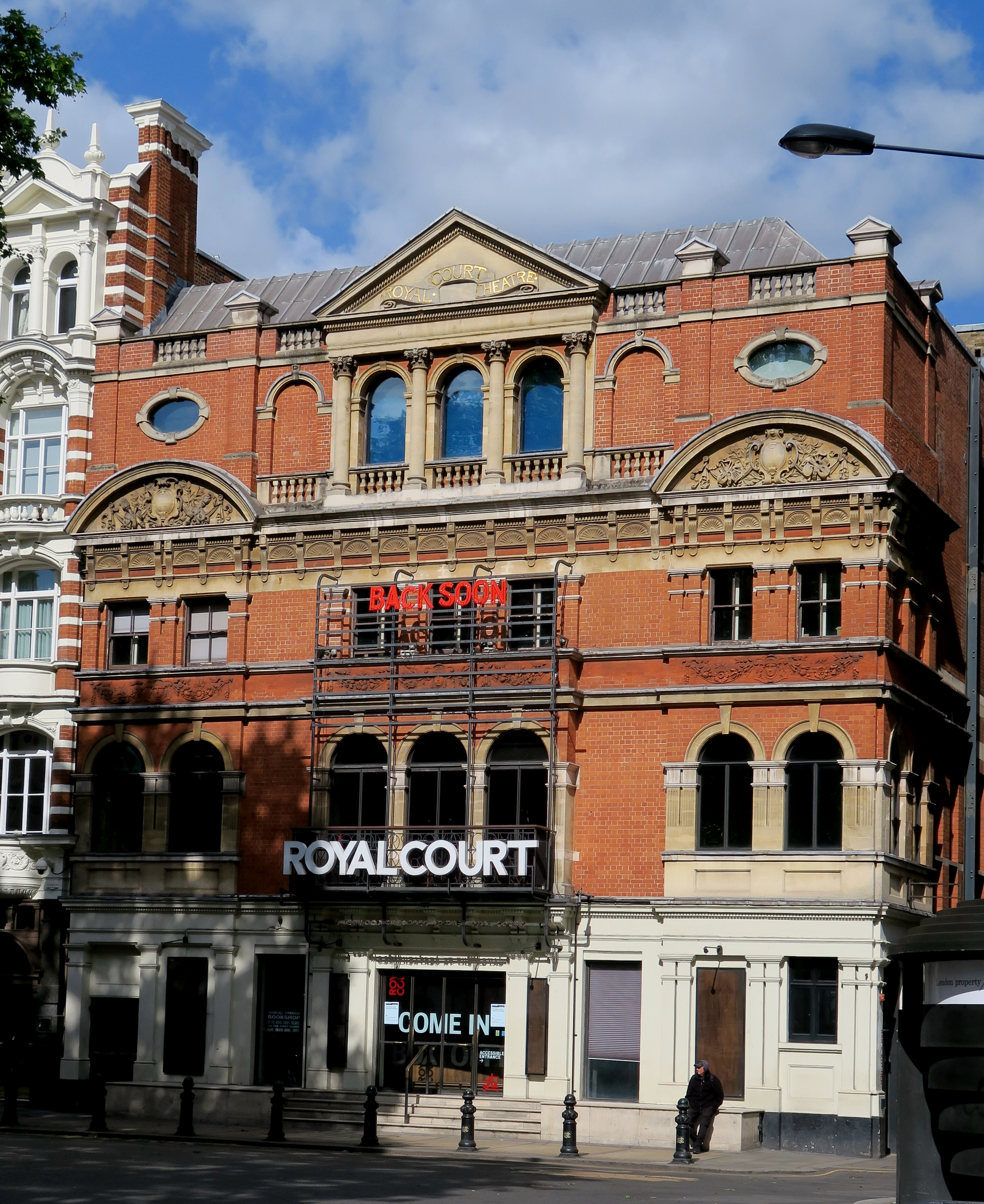
The Royal Court Theatre in 2020. Most of Soyinka's early plays were performed in the theatre.

Soyinka remained in Leeds after getting his BA honours in English in 1957. In 1957, he began writing his first plays, The Swamp Dwellers and The Lion and the Jewel. Soyinka moved to London and worked as a play reader for the Royal Court Theatre. He led the Nigerian Drama Group that performed The Swamp Dwellers in 1958. During that period, his two plays were performed in Ibadan, Nigeria. In 1957, his play, The Invention, was produced at London's Royal Court Theatre, and was his first work to be produced there. During this period, he wrote poems, including "The Immigrant" and "My Next Door Neighbour", which appeared in Black Orpheus. In 1959, Soyinka returned to Nigeria after receiving a Rockefeller Research Fellowship for his research on African theatre. In November of the same year, he replaced Janheinz Jahn as the co-editor of Black Orpheus. In 1960, he completed his radio play Camwood on the Leaves, and his play The Trials of Brother Jero premiered in the Mellanby Hall residence of University College Ibadan in April 1960. He formed the 1960s Mask, a theatre group. His play A Dance of The Forest, became the official play for the Nigerian Independence Day and on 1 October 1960, it premiered in Lagos.

Soyinka's first full-length play, My Father's Burden, was directed by Olusegun Olusola and it was featured on the Western Nigeria Television on 6 August 1960. In 1962, Soyinka wrote essays that defended Nigerian literacy during that period including "Death and the King's Horsemen" and "Towards a True Theater", which were published in Transition Magazine. In the same year, he was appointed lecturer at Obafemi Awolowo University in Ifẹ. In 1963, his first feature-length movie, Culture in Transition, was released. Soyinka resigned from his university post in 1964, as a protest against imposed pro-government behaviour by the authorities. He claimed the university's authorities aligned the institution with the unpopular government of Samuel Ladoke Akintola. During that period, he produced The Lion and the Jewel in a season of plays in English and Yoruba as well as formed The Orisun Theatre Company, a theatre group.

In 1965, he produced the satirical play Before the Blackout. His play Kongi's Harvest premiered in August 1965 in Lagos. On 14 September 1965, his play The Road premiered in London at the Commonwealth Arts Festival and at the Theatre Royal Stratford East. Soyinka was appointed as the senior lecturer at the University of Lagos. Soon, his novel The Interpreters was published in London by André Deutsch. In the same year, he was arrested for the first time, charged with holding up a radio station at gunpoint and replacing the tape of a recorded speech by the premier of Western Region with a different tape containing accusations of electoral malpractice. He was released after some months of confinement as a result of protests by the international community of writers. He also wrote The Detainee, a radio play for BBC in London.

=== 1966–1968: Nigerian Civil War ===
After becoming Chair of Drama at the University of Ibadan, Soyinka became politically active. Following the military coup of January 1966, he secretly met with Chukwuemeka Odumegwu Ojukwu, the military governor of the Southeastern Nigeria in an effort to avert the Nigerian Civil War. He also went to Ẹnugu, where he met his fellow Yoruba man, Victor Banjọ, who works with the Biafran government. Soyinka, who sought the support of Western Region military leaders, delivered Banjo's message to Lieutenant Colonel Olusegun Obasanjo, who had recently been appointed as commanding officer for the Western Region. Four evenings after Soyinka returned to the West, Biafran forces invaded the Midwest region. Following the occupation of the Midwest, Soyinka met Obasanjo to tell him the aim of Biafrans since Obasanjo had already decided to align with the Nigerian government. However Biafra's invasion of the Midwest resulted in retaliation by the federal government forces, and the civil war began. Obasanjo disclosed his meeting with Soyinka to the Nigerian government, who declared Soyinka a traitor, hence he was arrested by federal authorities and imprisoned for 22 months. He wrote a significant body of poems and notes criticising the Nigerian government while in prison.

In early 1967, his works Kongi’s Harvest and Idanre and Other Poems were published. With Tom Stoppard, he received the John Whiting Award in London. He was also appointed Head of the School of Drama, University of Ibadan but unable to take up the position because of his imprisonment in August. Despite his imprisonment, his play The Lion and The Jewel was produced in Accra, Ghana in September 1967. In November, The Trials of Brother Jero and The Strong Breed were produced in the Greenwich Mews Theatre in New York City by Off-Broadway.

In 1968, Soyinka received the Jock Campbell-New Statesman Award. The Negro Ensemble Company produced Kongi's Harvest at St. Mark's Theatre, New York. He translated D. O. Fagunwa's Ogboju Ode Ninu Igbo Irunmale from Yoruba to English. It was published as The Forest of a Thousand Demons: A Hunter's Saga.

=== Release and literary production ===
In October 1969, a few months before the civil war came to an end, amnesty was proclaimed, and Soyinka and other political prisoners were freed. For the first few months after his release, Soyinka stayed at a friend's farm in southern France, where he sought solitude. He wrote The Bacchae of Euripides (1969), a reworking of the Pentheus myth. He also published in London a book of poetry, Poems from Prison. At the end of the year, he returned to his office as Chair of Drama at Ibadan.

In 1970, he produced the play Kongi's Harvest, while simultaneously adapting it as a film of the same title. In June 1970, he finished another play, called Madmen and Specialists. Together with the group of 15 actors of Ibadan University Theatre Art Company, he went on a trip to the United States, to the Eugene O'Neill Memorial Theatre Center in Waterford, Connecticut, where his latest play premiered.

In 1971, his poetry collection A Shuttle in the Crypt was published. Madmen and Specialists was produced in Ibadan that year. In April 1971, concerned about the political situation in Nigeria, Soyinka resigned from his duties at the University in Ibadan, and began years of voluntary exile.

Soyinka travelled to Paris, France, to take the lead role of Patrice Lumumba, the murdered first Prime Minister of the Republic of the Congo, in Joan Littlewood's May 1971 production of Murderous Angels, Conor Cruise O'Brien's play about the Congo Crisis. In July in Paris, excerpts from Soyinka's well-known play The Dance of The Forests were performed.

In 1972, his novel Season of Anomy and his Collected Plays were both published by Oxford University Press. His powerful autobiographical work The Man Died, a collection of notes from prison, was also published that year. He was awarded an Honoris Causa doctorate by the University of Leeds in 1973. In the same year the National Theatre, London, commissioned and premiered the play The Bacchae of Euripides, and his plays Camwood on the Leaves and Jero's Metamorphosis were also first published. From 1973 to 1975, Soyinka spent time on scientific studies. He spent a year as a visiting fellow at Churchill College, Cambridge (1973–74) and wrote Death and the King's Horseman, which had its first reading at Churchill College.

In 1974, Oxford University Press issued Soyinka's Collected Plays, Volume II. He compiled the 1975 anthology Poems of Black Africa, which was published as part of the Heinemann African Writers Series. Also in 1975, Soyinka was promoted to the position of editor for Transition Magazine, which was based in the Ghanaian capital of Accra, where he moved. He used his columns in the magazine to criticise the "negrophiles" (for instance, his article "Neo-Tarzanism: The Poetics of Pseudo-Transition") and military regimes. He protested against the military junta of Idi Amin in Uganda. After the political turnover in Nigeria and the subversion of Gowon's military regime in 1975, Soyinka returned to his homeland and resumed his position as Chair of Comparative Literature at the University of Ife.

=== Teaching ===
From 1975 to 1999, Soyinka served as a Professor of Comparative literature at Obafemi Awolowo University. In the US, he taught at Cornell University as the Goldwin Smith professor for African Studies and Theatre Arts from 1988 to 1991. At Emory University, he was appointed Robert W. Woodruff Professor of the Arts in 1996 and has been a Professor of Creative Writing at the University of Nevada, Las Vegas. Soyinka served as scholar-in-residence at New York University's Institute of African American Affairs and at Loyola Marymount University in Los Angeles, California. He has also taught at the universities of Cambridge, Oxford, Harvard and Yale. He was a Distinguished Scholar in Residence at Duke University in 2008.

In December 2017, Soyinka received the Europe Theatre Prize in the "Special Prize" category, awarded to someone who has "contributed to the realization of cultural events that promote understanding and the exchange of knowledge between peoples". On 1 September 2022, Soyinka took up the appointment of Professor of Theatre at New York University Abu Dhabi.

In 1976, he published his poetry collection Ogun Abibiman, as well as a collection of essays entitled Myth, Literature and the African World. In these, Soyinka explores the genesis of mysticism in African theatre and, using examples from both European and African literature, compares and contrasts the cultures. He delivered a series of guest lectures at the Institute of African Studies at the University of Ghana in Legon. In October 1976, the French version of The Dance of The Forests was performed in Dakar, while in Ife, his play Death and The King's Horseman premiered.

In 1977, Opera Wọnyọsi, his adaptation of Bertolt Brecht's The Threepenny Opera, was staged in Ibadan. In 1979, Soyinka both directed and acted in Jon Blair and Norman Fenton's drama The Biko Inquest, a work based on the life of Steve Biko, a South African student and human rights activist who was beaten to death by apartheid police forces. In 1981 Soyinka published his autobiographical work Aké: The Years of Childhood, which won a 1983 Anisfield-Wolf Book Award.

Soyinka went on to establish another theatrical group, the Guerrilla Unit, which sought to engage directly with local communities. Its purpose was to help them reflect on their challenges and give voice to their grievances through short dramatic performances. In 1983, his play Requiem for a Futurologist had its first performance at the University of Ife. In July that year, one of his musical projects, the Unlimited Liability Company, issued a long-playing record entitled I Love My Country, on which several prominent Nigerian musicians played songs composed by Soyinka. In 1984, he directed the film Blues for a Prodigal, which was screened at the University of Ife. His A Play of Giants was produced the same year.

During the years 1975–84, Soyinka was more politically active. At the University of Ife, his administrative duties included the security of public roads. He criticized the corruption in the government of the democratically elected President Shehu Shagari. When Shagari was replaced by the army general Muhammadu Buhari, Soyinka was often at odds with the military. In 1984, a Nigerian court banned his 1972 book The Man Died: Prison Notes. In 1985, his play Requiem for a Futurologist was published in London by Rex Collings.

=== 1986: Nobel Prize winning ===
Soyinka was awarded the Nobel Prize for Literature in 1986, becoming the first African laureate. He was described as one "who in a wide cultural perspective and with poetic overtones fashions the drama of existence". Reed Way Dasenbrock writes that the award of the Nobel Prize in Literature to Soyinka is "likely to prove quite controversial and thoroughly deserved". He also notes that "it is the first Nobel Prize awarded to an African writer or to any writer from the 'new literatures' in English that have emerged in the former colonies of the British Empire." His Nobel acceptance speech, "This Past Must Address Its Present", was devoted to South African freedom-fighter Nelson Mandela. Soyinka's speech was an outspoken criticism of apartheid and the politics of racial segregation imposed on the majority by the National South African government.

=== 1988–present: Later career ===
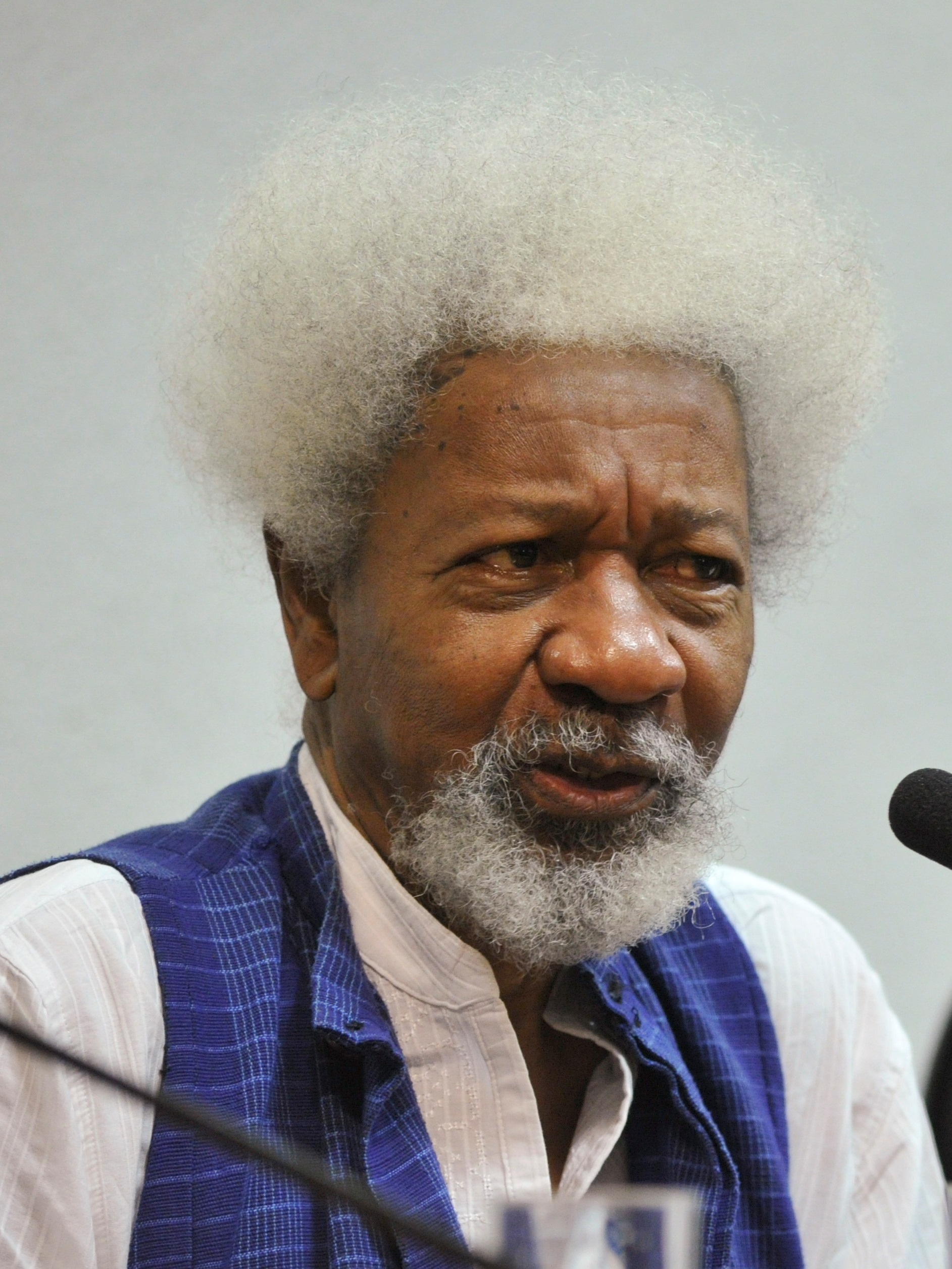
Soyinka in 2015

In 1988, his collection of poems Mandela's Earth, and Other Poems was published, while in Nigeria another collection of essays, entitled Art, Dialogue and Outrage: Essays on Literature and Culture, appeared. In the same year, Soyinka accepted the position of Professor of African Studies and Theatre at Cornell University. In 1989, he published a third book, Ìsarà: A Voyage around Essay, inspired by his father's intellectual circle ("Essay" being the nickname of his father S. A. Soyinka). In July 1991, the BBC African Service broadcast Soyinka's radio play A Scourge of Hyacinths, and the next year (1992) in Siena (Italy), his play From Zia with Love had its premiere. Both works are bitter political parodies, based on events that took place in Nigeria in the 1980s. In 1993, Soyinka was awarded an honorary doctorate from Harvard University. The following year, another part of his autobiography was published: Ibadan: The Penkelemes Years (A Memoir: 1946–1965). In 1995, his play The Beatification of Area Boy was published. In October 1994, he was appointed UNESCO Goodwill Ambassador for the Promotion of African culture, human rights, freedom of expression, media and communication.

In November 1994, Soyinka fled from Nigeria on a motorcycle via the border with Benin, and then went to the United States. In 1996, his book The Open Sore of a Continent: A Personal Narrative of the Nigerian Crisis was first published. In 1997, he was charged with treason by the government of General Sani Abacha. The International Parliament of Writers (IPW) was established in 1993 to provide support for writers victimized by persecution. Soyinka became the organization's second president, serving in the role from 1997 to 2000. In 1999, a new volume of poems by Soyinka, entitled Outsiders, was released. That same year, a BBC-commissioned play called Document of Identity aired on BBC Radio 3, telling the lightly-fictionalized story of the problems his daughter's family encountered during a stopover in Britain when they fled Nigeria for the US in 1996; her son, Oseoba Airewele was born in Luton and became a stateless person.

Soyinka's play King Baabu premièred in Lagos in 2001, a political satire on the theme of African dictatorship. In 2002, a collection of his poems entitled Samarkand and Other Markets I Have Known was published by Methuen. In April 2006, his memoir You Must Set Forth at Dawn was published by Random House. In 2006 he cancelled his keynote speech for the annual S.E.A. Write Awards Ceremony in Bangkok to protest the Thai military's successful coup against the government.

In April 2007, Soyinka called for the cancellation of the Nigerian presidential elections held two weeks earlier, beset by widespread fraud and violence. In the wake of the attempted bombing on a Northwest Airlines flight to the United States by a Nigerian student who had become radicalised in Britain, Soyinka questioned the British government's social logic in allowing every religion to openly proselytise their faith, asserting that it was being abused by religious fundamentalists, thereby turning England into, in his view, a cesspit for the breeding of extremism. He supported the freedom of worship, but warned against the consequence of the illogic of allowing religions to preach apocalyptic violence.

In August 2014, Soyinka delivered a recording of his speech "From Chibok with Love" to the World Humanist Congress in Oxford, hosted by the International Humanist and Ethical Union and the British Humanist Association. The Congress theme was Freedom of thought and expression: Forging a 21st Century Enlightenment. He was awarded the 2014 International Humanist Award. He served as Arts Professor of Theatre at NYU's Institute of African American Affairs.

In December 2020, Soyinka described 2020 as the most challenging year in the nation's history, saying: "With the turbulence that characterised year 2020, and as activities wind down, the mood has been repugnant and very negative. I don't want to sound pessimistic, but this is one of the most pessimistic years I have known in this nation and it wasn't just because of COVID-19. Natural disasters had happened elsewhere, but how have you managed to take such in their strides?"

September 2021 saw the publication of Chronicles from the Land of the Happiest People on Earth, Soyinka's first novel in almost 50 years, described in the Financial Times as "a brutally satirical look at power and corruption in Nigeria, told in the form of a whodunnit involving three university friends." Reviewing the book in The Guardian newspaper, Ben Okri said: "It is Soyinka's greatest novel, his revenge against the insanities of the nation's ruling class and one of the most shocking chronicles of an African nation in the 21st century. It ought to be widely read."

The film adaptation by Biyi Bandele of Soyinka's 1975 stage play Death and the King's Horseman, co-produced by Netflix and Ebonylife TV, titled Elesin Oba, The King's Horseman, premiered at the Toronto International Film Festival (TIFF) in September 2022. It is Soyinka's first work to be made into a feature film internationally, and the first Yoruba-language film to premiere at TIFF.

Around July 2023, Soyinka came under severe criticism after writing an open letter to the Emir of Ilorin, Ibrahim Sulu-Gambari, over the cancellation of the Isese festival proposed by an Osun priestess, Omolara Olatunji.

Two films have been made about Soyinka's life. The Man Died, directed by Awam Amkpa, is a feature film based on a fictionalized form of Soyinka's 1973 prison memoirs of the same title. Ebrohimie Road, written and directed by Kola Tubosun, explores the Ibadan house where Soyinka lived between 1967, when he returned to direct the School of Drama, and 1972, when he left for exile following his release from prison.

== Personal life ==
Soyinka has been married three times and divorced twice. He has eight children from his three marriages and two other daughters. His first marriage was in 1958 to the late British writer Barbara Dixon, whom he met at the University of Leeds in the 1950s. Barbara was the mother of his first son, Olaokun. Soyinka's first daughter Morenike was born in 1964. After they separated, he married Olaide Idowu, a Nigerian librarian, in 1963. The couple had three daughters: Moremi, Iyetade (1965–2013), and Peyibomi, and a son, Ilemakin. Soyinka's youngest daughter, Amani, was born in 1981. Soyinka married Folake Doherty in 1989, and the couple have three sons: Tunlewa, Bojode and Eniara.

On 15 July 2024, Oba Albert Adebose Mayungbe, the traditional monarch of Isara-Remo, conferred three traditional titles on Soyinka's children.

In 2014, Soyinka revealed his battle with prostate cancer.

Soyinka has commented on his close friendships with Toni Morrison and Henry Louis Gates Jr., saying: "Friendship, to me, is what saves one's sanity."

Soyinka is an atheist. In 2013, he visited the Benin Moat as the representative of UNESCO in recognition of the Naija seven Wonders project. He has served as the consultant for the Lagos Black Heritage Festival since the festival's establishment in 2009 by the Government of Lagos State. He was appointed a patron of Humanists UK in 2020.

In a book published in 2020, University College London academic Caroline Davis examined archival evidence of the Central Intelligence Agency (CIA) funding of African authors in the post-independence period. A chapter of the book was titled "Wole Soyinka, the Transcription Centre, and the CIA", and focused on Soyinka's receipt of funding from CIA front organisations such as the Farfield Foundation and the Transcription Centre. The funding supported Soyinka's publishing and the global production of some of his theatre plays. The book states that even after the CIA's covert role in some of these initiatives was revealed in the 1960s, Soyinka had "unusually close ties to the US government even to the point of frequently meeting with US intelligence in the late 1970s". When the book was published, Soyinka denied having been a CIA agent. Nigerian academic Adekeye Adebajo has argued in the Johannesburg Review of Books that Davis does not directly accuse Soyinka of being a CIA agent and that Soyinka's denials are therefore also misdirected.

Soyinka is a vocal critic of President Donald Trump. In October 2025, he said that the United States had revoked his visa after comments he made characterizing Trump as "Idi Amin in white face". He has also been banned from entering the US.

Singer Adekunle Gold became the first musician to sell out the Wole Soyinka Centre for Culture and the Creative Arts in Lagos on 26 December 2025.

The government of Ogun State postponed the unveiling of Wole Soyinka Train Station scheduled formerly for 3 January 2026.

In 2025, a viral photo which circulated on social media was claimed to be Soyinka and a young Gbenga Daniel standing behind him. The image, according to netizens, depicted 'loyalty'. However, the image has been labelled false by Dubawa, a fact-checking website.

On 9 December 2025, Soyinka criticised the large number of armed security personnel that he saw accompanying Seyi Tinubu, the son of President Tinubu.

== Views ==
=== Religion ===
Soyinka is a critic of organized religion, particularly Christianity and Islam, viewing them as human-created systems that can corrupt and limit potential, often leading to conflict and hypocrisy, though he acknowledges spirituality and uses Yoruba mythology (in this case, Oriṣa worship) as a creative source, seeing deities as "companions" rather than deities to be worshipped, embracing his African roots while rejecting imposed faiths. He identifies as an atheist but a "spirit-sensitive" one, valuing humanity as the highest religion and finding African traditional religions more authentic and less destructive than foreign ones.

Soyinka is also a critic of religious extremism. In a 2012 essay titled "Religion Against Humanity", published by Granta, he labelled religion as the greatest enemy of humanity. He told Channels Television that he dislikes how religion is used to justify violence, flout laws, and create societal problems in Nigeria, calling it the "number one problem for Nigerians".

== Legacy ==
=== Influence ===
The Wole Soyinka Annual Lecture Series was founded in 1994 by the National Association of Seadogs, dedicated "to honouring one of Nigeria and Africa's most outstanding and enduring literary icons: Wole Soyinka". In 2011, the African Heritage Research Library and Cultural Centre built a writers' enclave in Soyinka's honour at Adeyipo in Ibadan, Oyo State.

In 2014, Crucible of the Ages: Essays in Honour of Wole Soyinka at 80, edited by Ivor Agyeman-Duah and Ogochwuku Promise, was published by Bookcraft in Nigeria and Ayebia Clarke Publishing in the UK, with tributes and contributions from Nadine Gordimer, Toni Morrison, Ama Ata Aidoo, Ngugi wa Thiong'o, Henry Louis Gates Jr, Margaret Busby, Kwame Anthony Appiah, Ali Mazrui, and Sefi Atta. In 2018, Henry Louis Gates Jr tweeted that Nigerian filmmaker and writer Onyeka Nwelue visited him in Harvard and was making a documentary film about Soyinka.

In 2018, the University of Ibadan renamed its arts theatre to Wole Soyinka Theatre. In commemoration of Nigeria's 65th Independence Day Anniversary on 1 October 2025, President Bola Tinubu renamed the National Theatre to Wole Soyinka Centre for Culture and Creative Arts.

=== Honours ===
Soyinka won the John Whiting Award in 1967 for his play The Interpreters. In 1986, he won the Nobel Prize for Literature, as well as the Agip Prize for Literature. He also received the Commander of the Order of the Federal Republic, the second highest honour, by the military head of state Ibrahim Babangida. He won the Anisfield-Wolf Book Award for Aké: The Years of Childhood in 1983 and in 2013. He won the Special Jury Prize category of the Mondello Prize in 1990.

Soyinka was vested with the right to use the Yoruba title Oloye as a pre-nominal honorific. At various times, he was given the chieftaincy titles of the "Akogun" of Isara-Remo and the "Akinlatun" of Egbaland. He was honoured with the Golden Plate Award by the Academy of Achievement, presented to him by the Awards Council member, Archbishop Desmond Tutu at St. George's Cathedral, Cape Town. In 2017, he received the Special Prize category of the Europe Theatre Prize in Rome. In August 2024, the President of Cuba, Miguel Diaz-Canel, honoured Soyinka with the Haydée Santamaría medal.

== Writings ==
- The Interpreters (1965)
- Season of Anomy (1973)
- Death and the King's Horseman (1975)
- Harmattan Haze on an African Spring (2012)
- Chronicles from the Land of the Happiest People on Earth (2021)
