= Ebrohimie Road: A Museum of Memory =

American television series

- Directed by: Kola Tubosun
- Written by: Kola Tubosun
- Produced by: Kola Tubosun; Olajide Bello; Tunde Kelani; Deji Toye; Olajide Salawu
- Starring: Wole Soyinka; Olayide Soyinka; Femi Euba; Nelson Fashina; Folabo Ajayi-Soyinka; Olaokun Soyinka; Moremi Soyinka-Onijala; Peyibomi Soyinka-Airewele; Niyi Osundare; Femi Osofisan; Dan Izevbaye; Ilemakin Soyinka; Remi Raji
- Narrated by: Femi Elufowoju Jr
- Cinematography: Tunde Kelani
- Edited by: Danilo Santos
- Production companies: Oratures LLC; OlongoAfrica
- Release date: July 2024
- Running time: 100 minutes
- Countries: Nigeria, United States
- Language: English

Ebrohimie Road: A Museum of Memory is a documentary film written, produced, and directed by Kola Tubosun, and shot by Tunde Kelani, about the eponymous location at the University of Ibadan where Nigerian writer/playwright and Nobel Laureate Wole Soyinka lived and worked between 1967 and 1972. It was from there that Soyinka was arrested in 1967 after visiting the breakaway Biafra that was engaged in a civil war with Nigeria, and it was there to which he returned in 1969 after his release, before leaving for a voluntary exile a few years later. The film premiered in Nigeria in July 2024 as part of activities to mark Soyinka's 90th birthday, and has continued to screen in venues in the United States, United Kingdom, and elsewhere.

== Synopsis ==
The house at 8 Ebrohimie Road, University of Ibadan once housed Wole Soyinka and his family. The film returns to persons who knew the home, lived in it, or interacted with Soyinka and his family throughout his stay in Ibadan, and afterwards, to construct a story that intersects with the history of the university itself, the nation, and Soyinka's personal journey into literary superstardom.

According to the film writer and director, himself an alumnus of the University of Ibadan, the idea for the documentary came from his first contact with the bungalow at the university many years after his time in the institution. Discovering numerous stories connected to the location and their larger significance for the Nigerian literary, academic, political, and social history moved him to seek a chance to tell the story on the big screen. The work was supported by Open Society Foundations and Sterling Bank (Nigeria).

Subjects interviewed in the film include Wole Soyinka himself, colleagues and students like Femi Euba, Niyi Osundare, Femi Osofisan, Dan Izevbaye, Remi Raji; family members like Chief Mrs. Olayide Soyinka (his ex-wife) Omofolabo Ajayi-Soyinka (sister), Olaokun Soyinka (son), Moremi Soyinka-Onijala (daughter), Peyibomi Soyinka-Airewele (daughter), Ilemakin Soyinka (son); other witnesses like Joop Berkhout, Alabi Ogundepo, Kitibi Oyawoye, and others.

The film depended on archival footage, photographs, reminiscences of "central and peripheral characters", and newspaper clippings to recreate the story of the bungalow on Ebrohimie Road and the events that make it an important historical site.

== Reception ==
Reception has mostly been positive, with Mosunmola Adeojo writing that the film "transcends mere documentation to become a poetic exploration of memory, family, and the enduring marks we leave on the spaces we inhabit..." standing "as a powerful meditation on the intertwining of space, memory, and identity

"That Túbọ̀sún attempts to offer views of Ṣóyínká’s life from places of rest rather than liminal spaces of movement may be justified by the fact that solitude is central to the formation of Soyinka as an artist," wrote IfeOluwa Nihinlola "but it presents a logistical and philosophical conundrum for a project that attempts to pay tribute to his work. Unless Soyinka is ready to offer a glimpse into his seclusions, what we know of him and his work is best understood on the road,"

Dami Ajayi says "Ebrohimie Road ... succeeds in reaffirming the force of Soyinka's conviction, creativity, eloquence, and the fullness of his life." But Michael Chiedoziem Chukwudera thinks the work "needed more elucidation on the topic of Biafra..." and "the relevance of Soyinka’s stance to present-day Nigeria, especially as government-backed anti-Igbo sentiment has climbed back almost to the levels it was around the war" while acknowledging that the work "does well to establish its importance... (in) the preservation and projection of memories."

Gbubemi Atimomo says it highlights "how we celebrate and maintain sites and artefacts related to our accomplished national figures, preserve and document our history for posterity, conserve our environment, fight for one’s rights and the rights of others, the importance of family, and living a life of conviction." But according to Toni Kan, "The film's biggest achievement lies in the way it humanises Wole Soyinka by shining a bright light on the Nobel laureate’s private life away from his books."

Nzube Nlebedim remarked that the film "captures aspects that are far from being wholly anthropological and historical, and immerses in the more empathetic and introspective... In Ebrohimie Road, where the suddenly concerned present fuses with the perpetually traumatised past, Túbọ̀sún finds his ikigai, which, in the end, is an essence of art: a confluence between the created and the creator."

== Festivals and Educational Acquisition ==
Ebrohimie Road: A Museum of Memory won "Best Documentary" at the Africa-USA International Film Festival in Los Angeles on November 19, 2024. It also won "Best First Time Filmmaker" and "Best Documentary Subject/Profile" at the Travel Beyond Film Festival 2025.

The film is also official selection in nine film festivals, including the Documentaries Without Borders International Film Festival 2025, Touchstone Independent Film Festival, Imo International Film Festival, Africa International Film Festival (AFRIFF), and Second Poetic Cinema Festival, among others. It was also a semi-finalist at Hong Kong Indie Film Festival, Hawaii International Film Awards, Sacramento Independent Film Festival, and Nashville Independent Film Festivals. It has also screened at the New York African Film Festival.

It has also been acquired for educational use in five US Ivy League universities, and other colleges around the country.
