= The Secret Lives of Baba Segi's Wives =

The Secret Lives of Baba Segi's Wives may refer to:

- The Secret Lives of Baba Segi's Wives (novel), a 2010 novel by Lola Shoneyin
- The Secret Lives of Baba Segi's Wives (play), a 2018 stage play by Rotimi Babatunde based on the novel
