= Africa-USA International Film Festival =

Film festival held in Los Angeles, California, US

The Africa USA International Film Festival is an annual film festival that takes place in Los Angeles. The 2024 edition of the festival awarded films by Amelie Mbaye, Gary Telly JEANNOT, Denis Cougnaud, Apolline TRAORE, Kola Tubosun, and Dominique Philippe.

== Mission ==
The organisation's goals are "to provide a venue to showcase films from across the African and North American continents, in the hope of promoting mutual respect and understanding through cultural exchange." Every year, it awards prizes in the following categories:

- Best Film
- Best Short Film
- Best Screenplay
- Best Actress
- Best Actor
- Best CInematography
- Best Music Score
- Best LGBTQIA+
- Best Women Film
- Best Animation
- Best Documentary

== Film screenings ==
Major films and documentaries that have been screened at the festival include "The Green Legacy" (2024), "Think Outside the Box" (2024) and "Zipped" (2024), as well as "Lai-je bien Coupée" directed by Amelie Mbaye, "Dawn", produced by Gary Telly JEANNOT, "Frontieres (Borders)" directed by Denis Cougnaud and Apolline TRAORE, "Ebrohimie Road: A Museum of Memory", directed by Kola Tubosun, and "Safari in Conakry", directed by Dominique Philippe.
