= Titilola =

- Gender: Female
- Language: Yoruba

Origin
- Derivation: Nigeria
- Meaning: Nobility never fade
- Region of origin: Southwestern region

listen

Titilola or Títílọlá is a Yoruba feminine given name which means "nobility never fade". Notable people with the name include:

- Lola Shoneyin (Titilola Atinuke Alexandrah Shoneyin; born 1974), Nigerian poet and author
- Temi Fagbenle (Tèmítọ́pẹ́ Títílọlá Olúwatóbilọ́ba Fagbenle; born 1992), British–American basketball player
