= Caste: The Origins of Our Discontents =

2020 book by Isabel Wilkerson

- Cover image, based on a photo by Bruce Davidson at Magnum Photos
- Author: Isabel Wilkerson
- Audio read by: Robin Miles
- Cover artist: Greg Mollica (based on photo by Bruce Davidson)
- Language: English
- Publisher: Random House (US); Allen Lane (UK)
- Publication date: 4 August 2020
- Publication place: United States
- Media type: Print; digital; audiobook
- Pages: 496
- Awards: Goodreads Choice Award for History & Biography (2020); AudioFile Earphones Award (2020)
- ISBN: 978-0-593-23025-1
- OCLC: 1147928120
- Dewey Decimal: 305.5122
- LC Class: HT725.U6
- All identifiers refer to the hardcover edition unless otherwise noted

Caste: The Origins of Our Discontents is a nonfiction book by the American journalist Isabel Wilkerson, published in August 2020 by Random House. The book describes racism in the United States as an aspect of a caste system—a society-wide system of social stratification characterized by notions such as hierarchy, inclusion and exclusion, and purity. Wilkerson does so by comparing aspects of the experience of American people of color to the caste systems of India and Nazi Germany, and she explores the impact of caste on societies shaped by them, and their people.

Caste, which followed Wilkerson's 2010 book The Warmth of Other Suns, was met with critical acclaim and commercial success. It won or was nominated for several awards, and was featured prominently on nonfiction bestsellers lists and year-end best-books lists. It received a film adaptation in 2023, Origin, written and directed by Ava DuVernay.

== Contents ==
=== Pillars of caste ===
In Caste, Wilkerson identifies eight "pillars of caste", or features of caste systems in various societies:

- Divine will: the belief that social stratification is beyond human control, either divinely ordained or a natural law, as in the biblical story of the curse of Ham that was used to justify Black inferiority in the U.S.
- Heritability: the belief that social status is acquired at birth and immutable, as codified e.g. in the U.S. "one-drop rule" that determined Black ancestry
- Endogamy: the prohibition of sex and marriage between castes, as in the former U.S. anti-miscegenation laws
- Purity and pollution: the belief that the dominant caste is "pure" and must be protected against pollution by the inferior castes, as shown in the segregation of facilities for bathing, eating, education, etc. in the U.S. Jim Crow era
- Occupational hierarchy: the reservation of the more desirable occupations for the superior castes, as enshrined in U.S. Jim Crow laws that restricted Black people to farm or domestic work
- Dehumanization and stigma: the denial of individuality and human dignity of lower-caste individuals, as through the various arbitrary punishments and restrictions to which enslaved and free Black people were subject to in the U.S., down to racist carnival games.
- Terror and cruelty: as means of enforcement of the caste system and control of lower-caste people, as through the whippings of slaves or the lynchings of Black people in the U.S.
- Inherent superiority and inferiority of castes: the belief that people of one caste are inherently superior to those of other castes, expressed e.g. in restrictions on clothing or displays of status by lower-caste people, such as driving a car.

Wilkerson illustrates these pillars through examples from three caste systems: those of India, Nazi Germany and the United States.

=== Aspects and consequences of caste ===
She goes on to describe the "tentacles of caste": the various ways in which a caste system society permeates the workings of a society infected by it. These include the anxious efforts of upper-caste people to retain their superior social status even while their economic status crumbles, hence the "necessity of a bottom rung", or the perceived need to prevent lower-caste success, unconscious biases embedded in a society's culture that perpetuate the caste system, or the function of lower-caste people as scapegoats.

In her view, the caste framework helps to explain the participation of lower-caste people (Jewish kapos, Black police officers) in the oppression of their fellow caste members: caste systems self-perpetuate by rewarding those lower-caste people who comply with the system, thereby keeping the lower castes divided.

Wilkerson continues by describing the "consequences of caste", which degrade people of all castes. Among them are the "narcissism of caste", which makes culture revolve around and idealize the dominant caste, or the Stockholm syndrome that serves as a survival mechanism for lower-caste people but helps keep them captive, or the physiological stress experienced by lower-caste people that reduces their life expectancy. She addresses the mechanisms of backlash against attempts to transcend the caste system, as exemplified by the first lower-caste U.S. president (Barack Obama) being succeeded by one intent on reinforcing the system (Donald Trump), and the importance of the "symbols of caste", such as swastikas or Confederate flags, to the perpetuation of the system.

She concludes that societies in the grip of a caste system pay a harsh price for it: the distrust between castes translates into brutal criminal justice systems, and minimal or dysfunctional public health or social welfare systems – and as a result, a reduction in welfare for all but the most affluent, compared to other societies. In Wilkerson's view, the comparatively poor performance of the U.S. in the containment of the COVID-19 pandemic, and the high rate at which it impacts lower-caste Americans, are one example of such effects.

Wilkerson asks whether a "world without caste [that] would set everyone free" can exist. She concludes that it is possible – as in the dismantlement of Nazism after World War II – but that it requires both the bravery of individuals and an enormous effort of collective will especially by the dominant caste, given how deeply caste systems, like a chronic disease, are embedded in and shape societies.

=== Race and caste ===
Wilkerson argues that the social constructs of race and caste are not synonyms, but that they "can and do coexist in the same culture and serve to reinforce each other. Race, in the United States, is the visible agent of the unseen force of caste. Caste is the bones, race the skin."

== Film adaptation ==
Netflix produced a film adaptation of the book, titled Origin and directed by Ava DuVernay. The film, starring Aunjanue Ellis-Taylor, Jon Bernthal, Vera Farmiga and Niecy Nash-Betts, had its world premiere at the 80th Venice International Film Festival on September 6, 2023 and a theatrical release in the U.S. in January 2024. It received generally favorable reviews.

== Reception ==
The book received starred reviews in Publishers Weekly, The Library Journal, Kirkus, and Booklist, and was also reviewed by Kwame Anthony Appiah, Dwight Garner, Gillian Tett, Fatima Bhutto, Kenneth W. Mack, Sunil Khilnani, Gaiutra Bahadur, Emily Bernard, Lauren Michele Jackson, Carlo Wolff, Colin Grant, Mihir Bose, Matthew Syed, and Yashica Dutt, among others.

Kwame Anthony Appiah, for the cover story of The New York Times Book Review in August 2020, wrote that the book is "elegant and persuasive" and that it "is at once beautifully written and painful to read." Dwight Garner, in The New York Times, described Caste as "an instant American classic and almost certainly the keynote nonfiction book of the American century thus far." Publishers Weekly called Caste a "powerful and extraordinarily timely social history" in its starred review of the book. The Chicago Tribune wrote that Caste was "among the year's best" books, while The Washington Post called the epilogue "a prayer for a country in pain, offering new directions through prophetic language".

Tunku Varadarajan gave the book a mixed review, writing that Wilkerson "never offers a convincing argument for why American history and society are better examined through the lens of caste than of race" and "scarcely acknowledges that modern America has made vast strides to address racism." Time magazine called the book a "transformative new framework through which to understand identity and injustice in America."

The New York Journal of Books commended Wilkerson's body of work, writing, "Caste draws heavily on the powerful mingling of narrative, research, and visionary, sweeping insight that made Wilkerson's The Warmth of Other Suns the definitive contemporary study of African Americans' twentieth-century Great Migration from the Jim Crow South to northern, midwestern, and western cities. It deepens the resonance of that book (a seemingly impossible feat) by digging more explicitly into the pervasive racial hierarchy that transcends region and time."

Oprah Winfrey, after choosing the book for her 2020 Summer/Fall book club selection, said: "Of all the books I've chosen for book club over the decades, there isn't another that is more essential a read than this one." The book was also listed as one of Barack Obama's favorite books of 2020.

== Awards and honors ==
Caste's honors include the 2020 Goodreads Choice Awards for History & Biography, the AudioFile Earphones Award for the audiobook edition in 2020., the Carl Sandburg Literary Award and the New York University Axinn Foundation Prize. The book was a finalist for the 2020 Kirkus Prize, the 2020 National Book Critics Circle Award, and the 2021 PEN/John Kenneth Galbraith Award for Nonfiction. Caste was longlisted for the 2020 National Book Award for Nonfiction, the 2021 PEN/Jean Stein Book Award, and the 2021 Andrew Carnegie Medal for Excellence in Nonfiction.

In December 2020, Literary Hub analyzed 41 year-end best-books lists and reported that the book was among the most recommended of the year, making fifteen of the analyzed lists. The lists include Time, who placed Caste at the top of its list of the 10 Best Nonfiction Books of 2020, calling it an "electrifying work that reframes injustice and inequity in the U.S."

Year	Award	Category	Result	Ref(s)
2020	Goodreads Choice Award	History & Biography	Won	
2020	AudioFile Earphones Awards		Won	
2020	National Book Award	Nonfiction	Nominated (longlist)	
2020	Kirkus Prize	Nonfiction	Nominated (finalist)	
2020	Los Angeles Times Book Prize	Current Interest	Won	
2021	PEN/Jean Stein Book Award	N/A	Nominated (longlist)	
2021	PEN/John Kenneth Galbraith Award	Nonfiction	Nominated (finalist)	

== Release details ==
The book became a number one New York Times nonfiction best-seller in early November 2020 and, as of the September 26, 2021, issue, had spent 58 weeks on The Times nonfiction best sellers list. It is also a USA Today Best Seller, having debuted on August 13, 2020, the book peaked at number three and has spent 21 weeks on the list as of January 5, 2021. According to Publishers Weekly, the book had sold over half a million copies by the close of 2020.

- Hardcover: Wilkerson, Isabel (4 August 2020). Caste: The Origins of Our Discontents. New York: Random House. ISBN 978-0-593-23025-1. OCLC 1147928120. (496 pp.)
- Digital: Wilkerson, Isabel (4 August 2020). Caste: The Origins of Our Discontents. New York: Random House. ISBN 978-0-593-23026-8. OCLC 1147928120. (496 pp.)
- Audiobook (CD): Wilkerson, Isabel (18 August 2020), Caste: The Origins of Our Discontents, Miles, Robin, New York: Random House Audio, ISBN 978-0-593-39669-8, OCLC 1176245188 (870 minutes)
- Audiobook (MP3): Wilkerson, Isabel (4 August 2020), Caste: The Origins of Our Discontents, Miles, Robin, New York: Random House Audio, ISBN 978-0-593-33980-0, OCLC 1182631574 (867 minutes)
- Paperback: Caste: the origins of our discontents. Random House trade paperback. 14 February 2023. ISBN 9780593230275. OCLC 1369859133.

The book is published in the UK under the title Caste: The Lies That Divide Us.

== See also ==
- Caste discrimination in the United States
- The New York Times Non-Fiction Best Sellers of 2020
- The Color of Law
