= Kola Tubosun =

Nigerian linguist and writer (born 1981)

Kọ́lá Túbọ̀sún
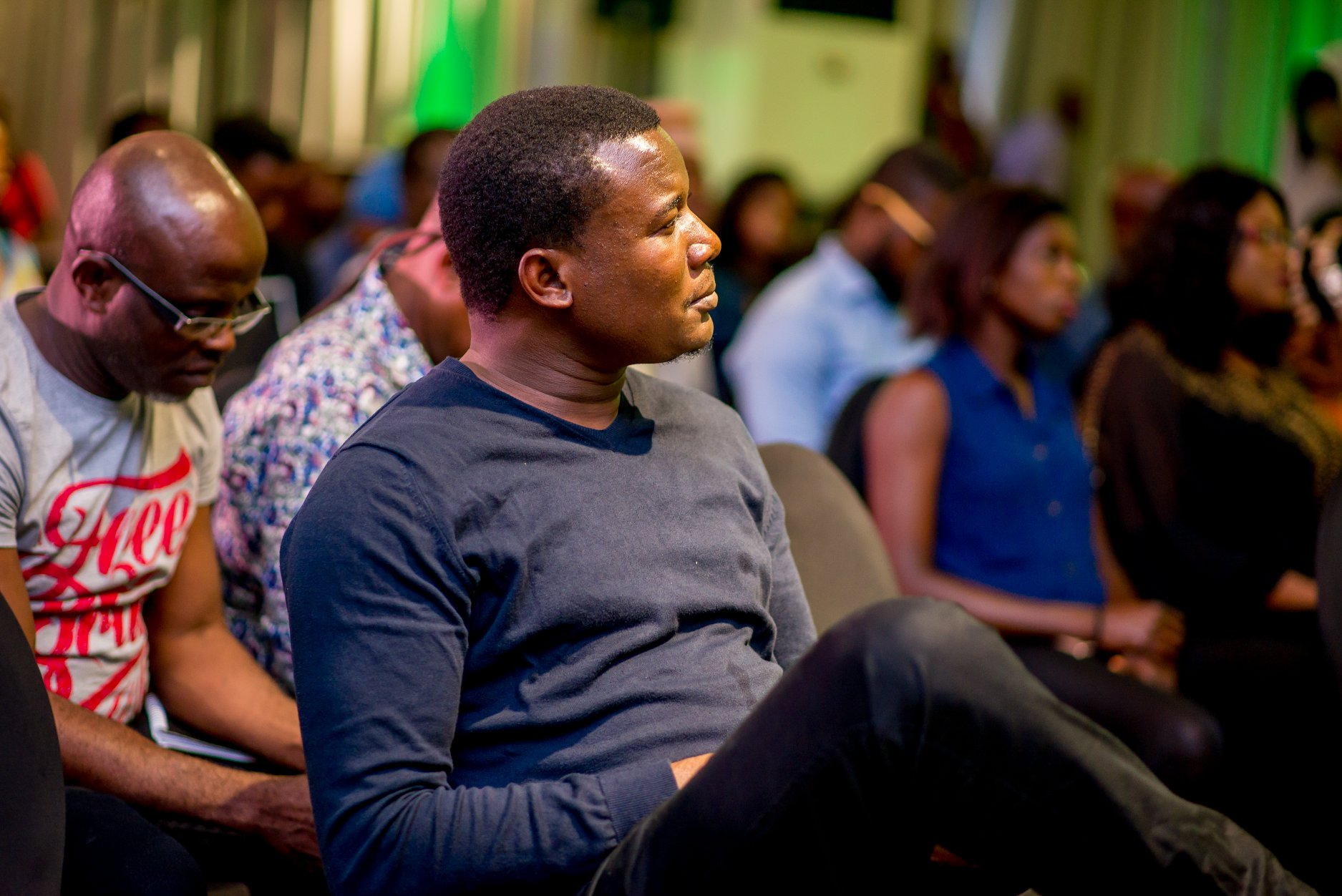
- Born: Kolawole Olugbemiro Olatubosun Oladapo; 22 September 1981 (age 44); Ibadan, Oyo State, Nigeria
- Other name: Kola Olatubosun
- Education: University of Ibadan; Moi University; Southern Illinois University Edwardsville
- Occupations: Linguist; writer; teacher
- Known for: Yoruba Name Project; Nigerian English Google Assistant; Best Literary Translations Anthology; OlongoAfrica
- Notable work: "Edwardsville by Heart", a collection of poetry; "Ìgbà Èwe", the translated poems of Emily R. Grosholz; Ebrohimie Road -- a documentary film (2024)
- Spouse: Temie Giwa
- Website: kolatubosun.com

Kọ́lá Túbọ̀sún (Yoruba: [kɔ́lá túbɔ̀sṹ]; born 22 September 1981) is a Nigerian linguist, writer, and film-maker best known for his work in African digital humanities. A Fulbright Fellow and Chevening Scholar, Túbọ̀sún has led efforts to integrate African languages into global technology, including the introduction of Nigerian English to Google’s voice recognition systems. He is the publisher of the literary platform OlongoAfrica and the director of the documentary Ebrohimie Road: A Museum of Memory (2024). In 2016, he became the first African to receive the Premio Ostana "Special Prize" for his advocacy in indigenous language rights. He is currently the Africa editor of the Best Literary Translations anthology, published by Deep Vellum.

== Biography ==
Túbọ̀sún was born in Ibadan, Nigeria. He holds a Bachelor of Arts from the University of Ibadan (2005) and a Master's degree in Linguistics from Southern Illinois University Edwardsville (2012). He was a Fulbright Scholar in 2009, teaching Yoruba at Southern Illinois University Edwardsville. In 2019, he was awarded a Chevening Research Fellowship at the British Library in London, where he worked with the library's 19th-century African language printed collection.

== Language technology and advocacy ==
Túbọ̀sún is a pioneer in the intersection of African linguistics and technology advocating for the "digital sovereignty" of African languages. In 2015, he founded YorubaName.com, a multimedia dictionary and lexicography project, which created the first accessible digital archive of Yoruba names.

The project created the first accessible digital archive of Yoruba names and their meanings, later expanding to include a free Yoruba keyboard software for Mac and Windows to facilitate digital communication in indigenous languages.

Túbọ̀sún’s work with Google Nigeria was instrumental in the localization of the Google Assistant, leading to the 2019 launch of the Nigerian English voice accent—a landmark recognition of the dialect by a major tech company. He also led the successful campaign to include Yoruba as a supported language on Twitter (now X) and served as a consultant for the Oxford English Dictionary (OED), contributing to the historical inclusion of Nigerian English entries in 2019.

== Literary and cultural preservation ==
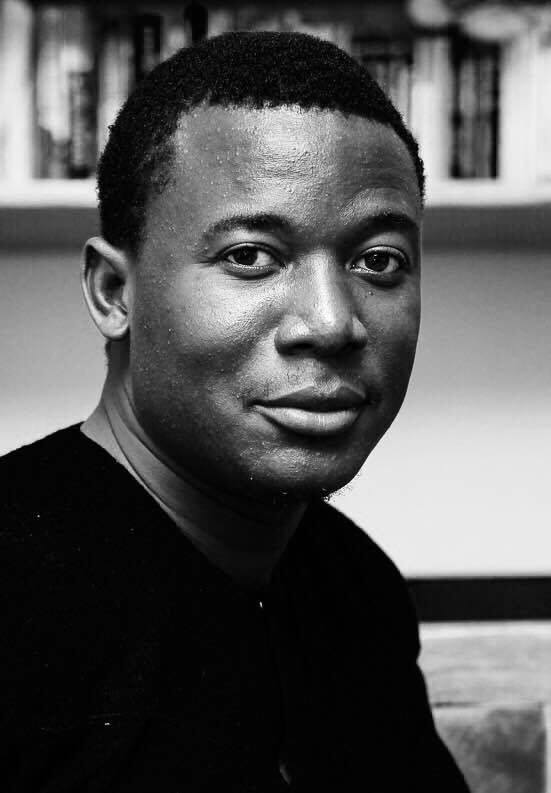
Kola Tubosun

As a cultural archivist, Túbọ̀sún focuses on preserving African intellectual history through film, translation, and publishing.

In 2018, Túbọ̀sún was awarded the Miles Morland Writing Scholarship to write a biography of Nobel Laureate Wole Soyinka. This research part-influenced in his debut feature documentary, Ebrohimie Road: A Museum of Memory (2024). The film chronicles Soyinka’s life in the University of Ibadan bungalow where the writer was arrested in 1967. The documentary has been acquired for the African Studies collections of major institutions, including Harvard University, Yale University, Columbia University, University of Pennsylvania, and University of Chicago.

Túbọ̀sún is the publisher and editor-in-chief of OlongoAfrica, a platform for creative writing and journalism. In 2023, Tubosun led the 'Black Orpheus Revisited' project, a digital archival initiative funded by the Open Society Foundations to digitize and preserve the complete run of the influential literary journal Black Orpheus journal (1957–1975). The project, which draws from his personal collection of the magazines, was featured in The World of Interiors in September 2025.

He previously edited Aké Review and served as the Africa Editor for the inaugural Best Literary Translations anthology (Deep Vellum, 2024). He is a prolific translator, having translated works by Ngũgĩ wa Thiong'o, Haruki Murakami, Chimamanda Adichie, Wole Soyinka, James Baldwin, and others into Yoruba. His second poetry collection, Ìgbà Èwe (2021), features original Yoruba translations of poetry by American philosopher Emily Grosholz. In September 2019, Tubosun co-founded The Brick House Cooperative, with eight other publications with the aim of presenting independent viewpoints from all around the world. He became the founding editor-in-chief and publisher of OlongoAfrica, a literary-journalistic platform for new creative writing from Africa. He's also a travel writer.

== Selected works ==
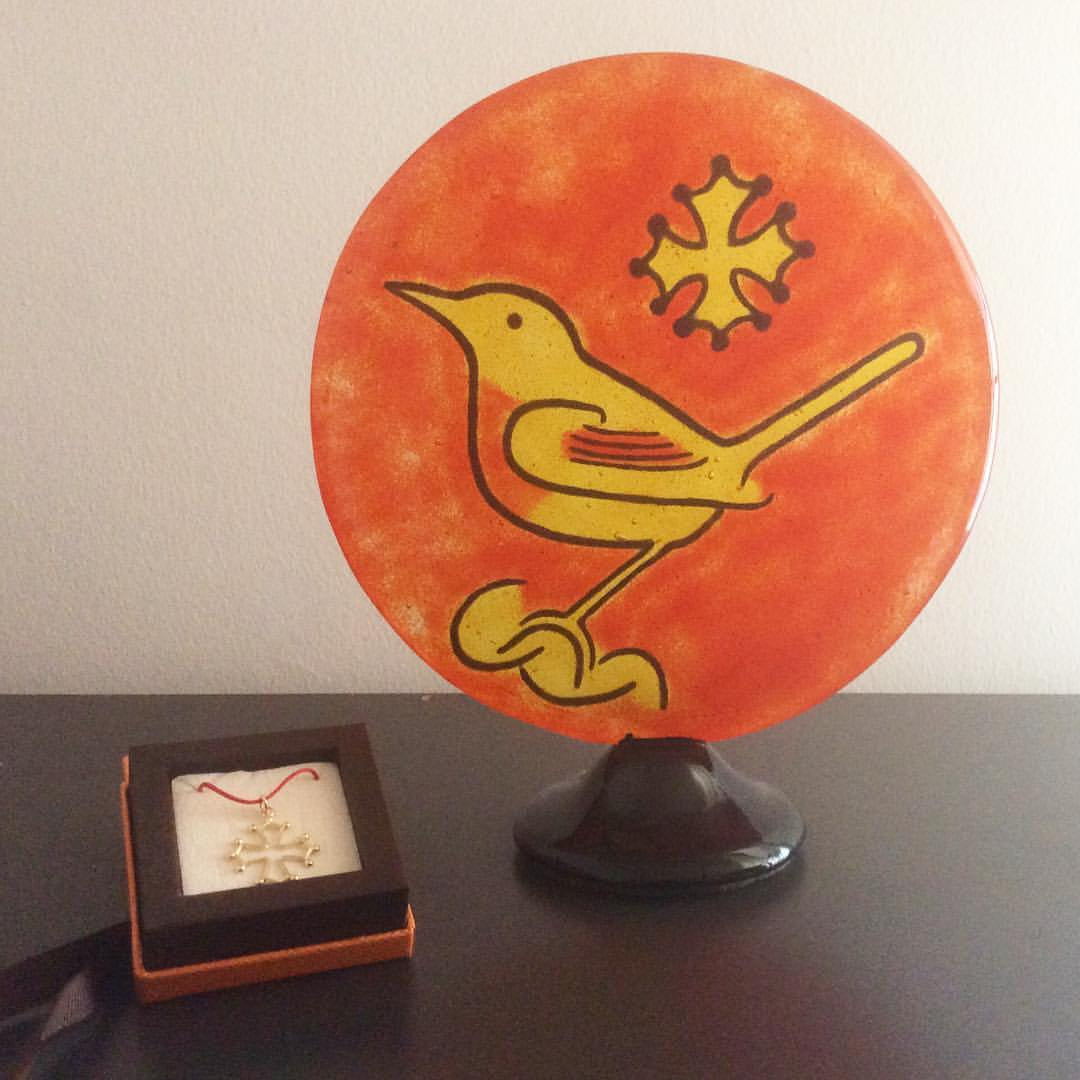
The Premio Ostana, a glass-art sculpture and a medal, created by Silvio Vigliaturo, a famous contemporary Italian artist and glass sculptor.

Books

- Edwardsville by Heart (2018) – Poetry/Travelogue
- Ìgbà Èwe (2021) – Poetry (Bilingual)
- Best Literary Translations 2024 (Co-Editor)
- Èṣù at the Library (2024)

Filmography

- Life Turns Man Up and Down (2027) – Director/Producer
- Ebrohimie Road: A Museum of Memory (2024) – Director/Producer
- Ministry of Ungentlemanly Warfare (2024) – Linguistic consultant
- Elesin Oba: The King's Horseman (2022) – Translator and Consultant
- Aisha (2022) Dialect Consultant

Edited

- Best Literary Translations anthology (co-editor) 2024-date
- Edo North: Field Studies of the Languages and Lands of the Northern Edo (ed., 2011). Essays in Honour of Professor Ben O. Elugbe. Zenith Book House.
- NTLitMag: 29 Issues (2012–2015)

== Awards and honors ==
- Premio Ostana "Special Prize" (2016) – First African recipient.
- Miles Morland Writing Scholarship (2018)
- Chevening Research Fellowship (2019)
- CNN African Journalists Award (Nominee, 2015) – First blogger nominated.

== Personal life ==
His father, Olatubosun Oladapo, was a poet and journalist. His sister, Yemi Adesanya, is an accountant and author. His wife, Temie Giwa, founded LifeBank, a health logistics company. He lives between Lagos, Nigeria and Minneapolis, Minnesota.

== See also ==
- List of Nigerian bloggers
