= Isabel Wilkerson =

American journalist (born 1961)

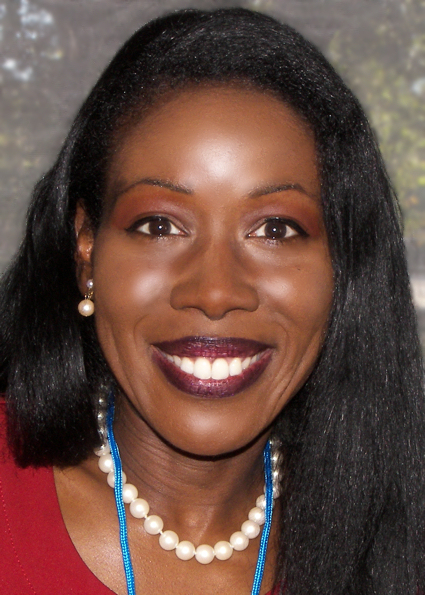
- Wilkerson at the 2010 Texas Book Festival
- Born: 1961 (age 64–65); Washington, D.C., U.S.
- Education: Howard University (BA)
- Occupations: Journalist; author
- Writing career
- Subjects: Journalism; history
- Notable works: The Warmth of Other Suns; Caste: The Origins of Our Discontents
- Notable awards: George Polk Award for Regional Reporting: Pulitzer Prize for Feature Writing; National Book Critics Circle Award for Nonfiction; Anisfield-Wolf Book Award for Nonfiction

Isabel Wilkerson (born 1961) is an American journalist and the author of The Warmth of Other Suns: The Epic Story of America's Great Migration (2010) and Caste: The Origins of Our Discontents (2020). She was the first African-American woman to win the Pulitzer Prize for journalism.

Wilkerson was the editor-in-chief of the Howard University college newspaper, interned at the Los Angeles Times and Washington Post, and became the Chicago Bureau chief of The New York Times. She also taught at Emory University, Princeton University, Northwestern University, and Boston University.

Wilkerson interviewed more than a thousand people for The Warmth of Other Suns, which documents the stories of the Great Migration of African Americans to northern and western cities during the 20th century. Her 2020 book Caste describes the racial hierarchy in the United States as a caste system. Both books were best-sellers.

== Early life and education ==
Isabel Wilkerson was born in Washington, D.C. in 1961 to parents who left Virginia during the Great Migration. Her father, Alexander Wilkerson, was one of the Tuskegee Airmen during World War II.

Wilkerson studied journalism at Howard University, becoming editor-in-chief of the college newspaper The Hilltop. During college, she interned at publications including the Los Angeles Times and The Washington Post.

== Career ==
In 1994, while the Chicago Bureau chief of The New York Times, she became the first African-American to win the Pulitzer Prize in journalism, winning the feature writing award for her coverage of the Great Mississippi and Missouri Rivers Flood of 1993 and her profile of a 10-year-old boy who was responsible for his four siblings.

She has been the James M. Cox Professor of Journalism at Emory University, the Ferris Professor of Journalism at Princeton University, a Kreeger-Wolf endowed lecturer at Northwestern University, and a professor of journalism and the Director of Narrative Nonfiction at Boston University College of Communication. She also served as a board member of the National Arts in Journalism Program at Columbia University.

External videos
- Q&A interview with Isabel Wilkerson on The Warmth of Other Suns, September 26, 2010, C-SPAN

In 2010, after fifteen years of research and writing, she published The Warmth of Other Suns: The Epic Story of America's Great Migration, which examines the three geographic routes that were commonly used by African Americans leaving the southern states between 1915 and the 1970s, illustrated through the personal stories of people who took those routes. During her research for the book, Wilkerson interviewed more than 1,000 people who made the migration from the South to Northern and Western cities.

The book reached number 5 on The New York Times Best Seller list for nonfiction and was included in lists of best books of 2010 by The New York Times, The New Yorker, Amazon, Salon, The Washington Post, The Economist, Atlanta, and The Daily Beast. In March 2011, The Warmth of Other Suns won the National Book Critics Circle Award for Nonfiction. The book also won the Anisfield-Wolf Book Award for Nonfiction, the Mark Lynton History Prize, the Hillman Book Prize, the Chicago Tribune Heartland Prize for Nonfiction, and the NAACP Image Award for Outstanding Literary Work – Debut Author. It was the nonfiction runner-up for the Dayton Literary Peace Prize in 2011.

In 2016, Wilkerson was awarded a National Humanities Medal by President Barack Obama for "championing the stories of an unsung history."

Wilkerson's 2020 book Caste: The Origins of Our Discontents argues that racial stratification in the United States is best understood as a caste system, akin to those in India and Nazi Germany. A review by Dwight Garner in The New York Times described it as "an instant American classic and almost certainly the keynote nonfiction book of the American century thus far." Publishers Weekly called it a "powerful and extraordinarily timely social history." Caste was included in Oprah's Book Club, where Oprah Winfrey described calling Wilkerson after being moved to tears by the book. A reviewer for the Chicago Tribune wrote that the book was "among the year's best." The book peaked at number one on The New York Times nonfiction best-seller list.

In October 2020, Netflix announced that Ava DuVernay would write, direct, and produce a feature film adaptation of Caste. Netflix did not remain attached to the project and the film was financed from several other sources. The film was released in 2023 under the title Origin; in it, Aunjanue Ellis-Taylor plays Wilkerson as she travels to do research for Caste.

Caste was targeted by book ban efforts in Texas libraries in 2023.

== Personal life ==
In 1989, Wilkerson married Roderick Jeffrey Watts in Fort Washington, Maryland.

In 2009, Wilkerson married her second husband, Brett Kelly Hamilton. He had a rare type of brain tumor and after multiple surgeries, he suffered from seizures. A seizure was the cause of his death on July 19, 2015.

== Publications ==
=== Books ===
- The Warmth of Other Suns: The Epic Story of America's Great Migration (Random House, 2010). ISBN 978-0-679-44432-9
- Caste: The Origins of Our Discontents (Random House, 2020). ISBN 978-0-593-23025-1

=== Selected articles and book chapters ===
- "First Born, Fast Grown: The Manful Life of Nicholas, 10", in The New York Times (April 1993)
- "THE MIDWEST FLOODING: On the Des Moines; Flood Damage Immobilizes Des Moines", in The New York Times (July 1993)
- "Cruel Flood: It Tore at Graves, and at Hearts", in The New York Times (August 1993)
- "He Put a Spin on Design", in The Last Word: The New York Times Book of Obituaries and Farewells: a Celebration of Unusual Lives, edited by Marvin Siegel (William Morrow and Company, 1997)
- "Superstars of Dreamland", in Best American Movie Writing, edited by George Plimpton (St. Martin's Press, 1998)
- "We Americans 2000", in We Americans: Celebrating a Nation, Its People and Its Past, edited by Thomas B. Allen and Charles O. Hyman (National Geographic, 1999)
- "Two Boys, a Debt, a Gun, a Victim: The Face of Violence", in Writing the World: Reading and Writing about Issues of the Day, edited by Charles R. Cooper and Susan Peck MacDonald (Macmillan Inc., 2000)
- "Interviewing Sources", in Nieman Reports vol. 56, no. 1 (Spring 2002)
- "Angela Whitiker's Climb", in Class Matters (Times Books, 2005)
- "Interviewing: Accelerated Intimacy", in Telling True Stories: A Nonfiction Writers' Guide from the Nieman Foundation at Harvard University, edited by Mark Kramer and Wendy Call (Plume, 2007)
- "America's Enduring Caste System", in The New York Times Magazine (July 2020)

== Awards ==
- 1993: George Polk Award for Regional Reporting, in The New York Times
- 1994: Pulitzer Prize in Journalism for Feature Writing
- 1994: National Association of Black Journalists Journalist of the Year
- 1998: Guggenheim Fellowship
- 2010: National Book Critics Circle Award for Nonfiction, The Warmth of Other Suns
- 2011: NAACP Image Award for Outstanding Literary Work – Debut Author, The Warmth of Other Suns
- 2011: Anisfield-Wolf Book Award, The Warmth of Other Suns
- 2011: Mark Lynton History Prize, The Warmth of Other Suns
- 2011: Hillman Book Prize, The Warmth of Other Suns
- 2011: Chicago Tribune Heartland Prize for Nonfiction, The Warmth of Other Suns
- 2015: National Humanities Medal
- 2020: Los Angeles Times Book Prize for Current Interest, Caste

Wilkerson has been awarded honorary doctorates from several universities:

- 1998: Hamline University
- 2011: DePaul University
- 2011: Niagara University
- 2012: Howard University
- 2013: Muhlenberg College
- 2014: Southern Methodist University
- 2014: Bates College
- 2018: Middlebury College
- 2022: Smith College
- 2022: Colby College
- 2022: Northwestern University
- 2023: Occidental College
- 2025: Grinnell College
- 2025: Carleton College
- 2026: Brandeis University
