= Best Literary Translations =

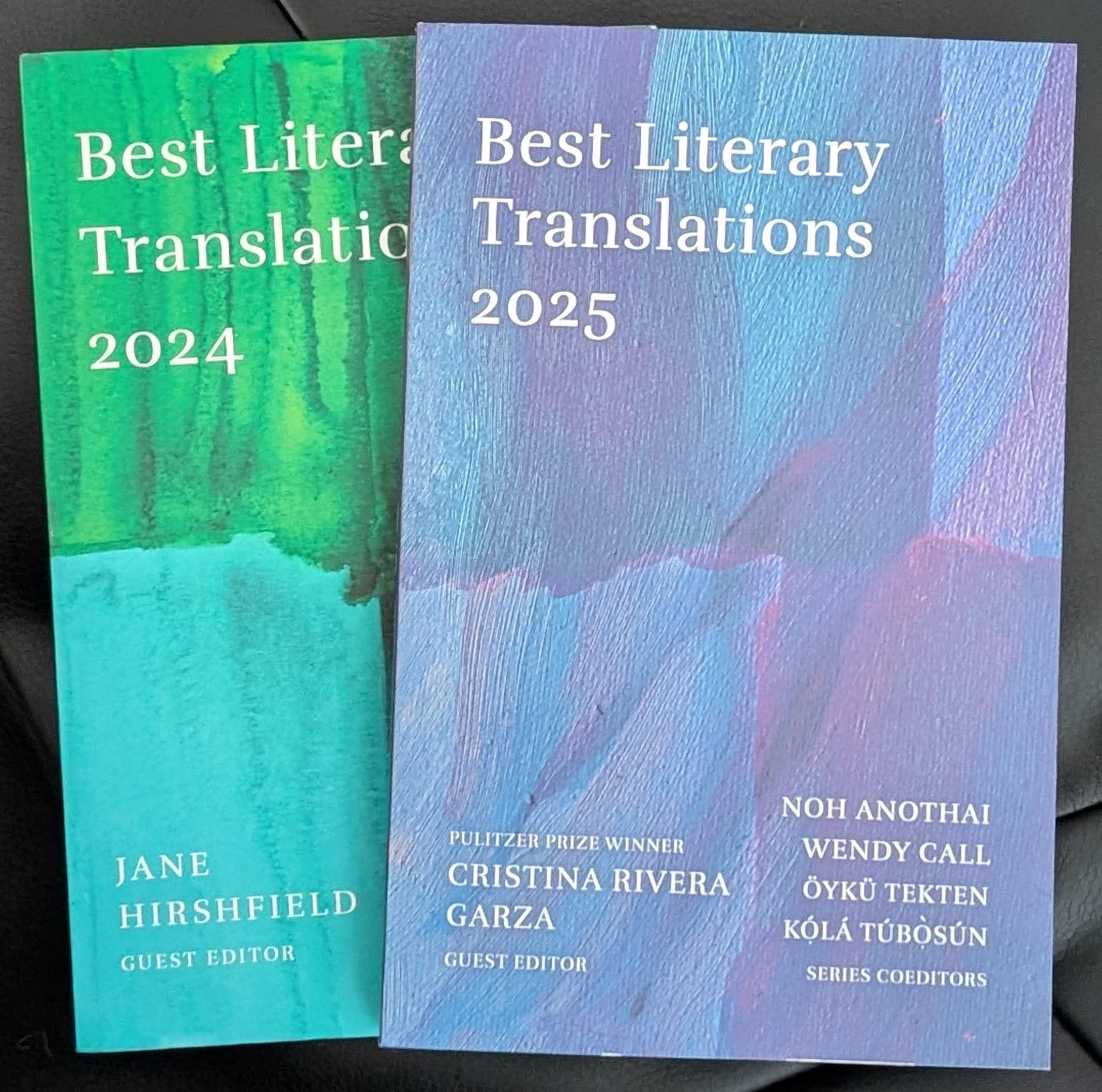
Best Literary Translations 2024 and 2025

Best Literary Translations (BLT) is "the first U.S. anthology devoted to celebrating the breadth of literary translators’ work". It is a "new annual featuring the year’s best poetry, short fiction, and essay, drawn from U.S.-affiliated literary journals and magazines" and curated by four series co-editors and one guest editor. The anthology series aims to celebrate world literature, and honor the brilliant work of translators and the literary journals that publish this work.

The inaugural edition in 2024 was guest-edited by Jane Hirshfield.

== History ==
Best Literary Translations was founded in October 2020 by Wendy Call when, after a conversation with Daniel Simon of World Literature Today, she launched a call for editors to work on an annual publication of this nature. The inaugural co-editors Noh Anothai, Wendy Call, Oyku Tekten and Kola Tubosun joined. Shortly after, Deep Vellum in Texas signed on as the official publisher.

The project has been renewed by Deep Vellum for a third year.

== Editions ==
The inaugural edition of Best Literary Translations anthology was published in 2024. It was guest-edited by Jane Hirshfield, with a dedication to Edith Grossman.

Of the first edition, World Literature Today writes "in a world in which nationalism increasingly carves moats between literatures, may the 2025 edition continue building a world literature portrait for the ages." Jack Rockwell of the North American Review writes of the anthology: "BLT 2024 at once advocates to a wider audience for the importance of publishing and reading literary translations, and makes important claims within the translation community about the practice’s possibilities, argued forcefully on political and aesthetic grounds."

The 2025 guest-editor was Pulitzer prizewinning writer Cristina Rivera Garza. The edition was dedicated to Refaat Alareer and Jerome Rothenberg.

The 2026 edition was guest-edited by Arthur Sze.

The 2027 edition will be edited by Emily Wilson.
