= Jane Hirshfield =

American poet, essayist and translator

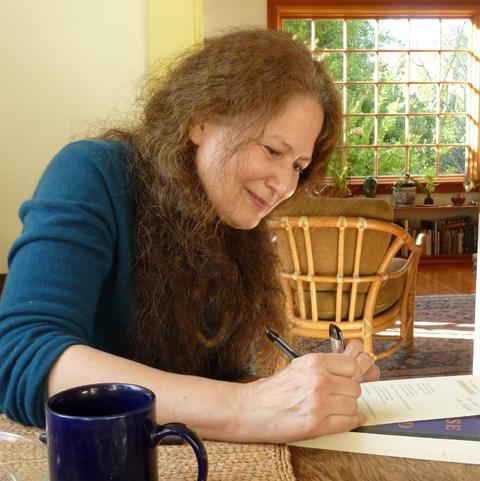
- Hirshfield in 2011
- Born: February 24, 1953 (age 73); New York City, U.S.
- Education: Princeton University
- Writing career
- Genre: Poetry

Jane Hirshfield (born February 24, 1953) is an American poet, essayist, and translator, known as "one of American poetry's central spokespersons for the biosphere" and recognized as "among the modern masters" who writes "some of the most important poetry in the world today." A 2019 elected member of the American Academy of Arts and Sciences, her books include award-winning collections of poems, collections of essays, and edited and co-translated volumes of historical writers. Widely published in newspapers and literary journals, her work has been translated into over fifteen languages.

== Early life and education ==
Jane Hirshfield was born on East 20th Street in New York City. She received her bachelor's degree in 1973 from Princeton University, part of the school's first graduating class to include women as freshmen. She received lay ordination in Soto Zen at the San Francisco Zen Center in 1979.

== Career ==
Hirshfield's ten books of poetry have received numerous awards, including the California Book Award, the Poetry Center Book Award, the Donald Hall-Jane Kenyon Award in American Poetry, and Columbia University's Translation Center Award. Her fifth book, Given Sugar, Given Salt, was a finalist for the National Book Critics Circle Award and her sixth collection, After, was shortlisted for the T. S. Eliot Prize and named a best book of 2006 by The Washington Post, the San Francisco Chronicle, and Financial Times. Her eighth collection, The Beauty, was longlisted for the National Book Award and named a best book of 2015 by the San Francisco Chronicle.

She has written two books of essays, Nine Gates: Entering the Mind of Poetry and Ten Windows: How Great Poems Transform the World. The Ink Dark Moon, her co-translation of the work of classical Japanese poets Izumi Shikibu and Ono no Komachi, was instrumental in bringing the tanka form to the attention of American poets. She has edited four books collecting the work of historical poets and is noted as being "part of a wave of important scholarship then seeking to recover the forgotten history of women writers."

She received a Guggenheim Fellowship in 1985, the Academy of American Poets Fellowship for Distinguished Achievement in 2004, and a National Endowment for the Arts fellowship in 2005.

Hirshfield has taught at the University of California, Berkeley, University of San Francisco, and as the Elliston Visiting Poet at the University of Cincinnati. She was the Hellman Visiting Artist in 2013 in the Neuroscience Department at University of California, San Francisco, and Stanford University's 2015-2016 Mohr Visiting Professor in Poetry. In 2022, she was the third Seamus Heaney International Visiting Poetry Fellow at Queen's University Belfast. She has also taught at many writers' conferences, including Bread Loaf and the Napa Valley Writer's Conference, and has served as core faculty in the Bennington Writing Seminars. Hirshfield appears frequently in literary festivals both in America and abroad, including the Geraldine R. Dodge Poetry Festival and the National Book Festival. She has received numerous residency fellowships, including from Yaddo, the MacDowell Colony, the Rauschenberg Foundation, the Rockefeller Foundation's Bellagio Center, the Civitella Ranieri Foundation, and the Djerassi Artists Residency.

She is also a contributing editor at The Alaska Quarterly Review, Tricycle, and Ploughshares; an advisory editor at Orion; and a former guest editor of The Pushcart Prize Anthology.

Jane Hirshfield served as a chancellor of the Academy of American Poets from 2012–2017.

In 2017, Hirshfield founded Poets For Science, an online and travelling installation exploring the connection between poetry and science, in partnership with the Wick Poetry Center at Kent State University, Ohio.

In 2019, Hirshfield was elected to the American Academy of Arts and Sciences.

In 2024, Hirshfield became the inaugural guest editor for the Best Literary Translations anthology, published by Deep Vellum.

In July 2024, Hirshfield was the first English-language writer and the first woman to receive the Zhongkun International Poetry Award, China's preeminent non-governmental award for a world poet, given by Peking University's Poetry Research Institute. The jury citation reads, in part: "Jane Hirshfield's poetry emerges from a deep mixing of language, ideas, and sounds that join us, in often unknowable ways, across oceans and centuries [...] Woven from collective traditions and personal insights, her poetry serves as a tether transcending boundaries, bringing us to the deep Pacific Basin of shared poetics."

== Poetry ==
Kay Ryan called Hirshfield "a true person of letters." Hirshfield's poetry has been described as sensuous and insightful. In the award citation for Hirshfield's 2004 Academy of American Poets Fellowship, Rosanna Warren noted:

Hirshfield has elaborated a sensuously philosophical art that imposes a pause in our fast-forward habits of mind. Her poems appear simple, and are not. Her language, in its cleanliness and transparency, poses riddles of a quietly metaphysical nature. Clause by clause, image by image, in language at once mysterious and commonplace, Hirshfield's poems clear a space for reflection and change. They invite ethical awareness, and establish a delicate balance.

The comment was echoed by poet Czesław Miłosz, who wrote that her poetry shows a "profound empathy for the suffering of all living beings [and] illuminates the Buddhist virtue of mindfulness." Lisa Russ Spaar has called Hirshfield "a visionary."

Hirshfield's poetry reflects her immersion in a wide range of poetic traditions, particularly Asian and European, interests found also in the essays of Nine Gates and Ten Windows. Scandinavian, Eastern European, and East Asian poets have been particularly important to her. Zbigniew Herbert's poem "Pebble" is a model for the small studies Hirshfield has labelled "pebbles", included in After and each of her subsequent volumes of poetry.

Hirshfield's work consistently explores themes of social justice and environmental awareness, specifically the belief that natural world and human world are inextricably linked. Mark A. Eaton noted in the Dictionary of Literary Biography that "Hirshfield's work recognizes the full breadth and responsibilities of humans' transactions with the earth, not just the intimacies." Donna Seaman, reviewing Hirshfield's ninth collection, Ledger, described Hirshfield's "carefully weighted tone as she reckons with our constant subtraction of Earth's life forces and incessant addition of carbon to our atmosphere, acid to our seas."

Hirshfield has become a spokesperson for peace, justice, and environmental issues. In a review of her seventh collection, Come, Thief, Afaa M. Weaver wrote that her poems "find a middle ground between the larger landscape of political conflict and the personal landscape of our need to connect with one another." Her work concludes the Library of America's War No More: Three Hundred Years of American Antiwar and Peace Writing and has appeared in many other collections of poems about social awareness.

An article in Critical Survey of Poetry (2002) summarized the effect of Zen on Hirshfield's work:

Little of her poetry is political in the usual sense of direct comment on specific issues, but all her work is political in the sense of integrating the stirrings of the heart, with the political realities that surround all people. Undoubtedly, the source for these characteristics of her poetry, and for her very concept of what poetry is, "the magnification of being," derives from her strong Zen Buddhist training. Her emphasis on compassion, on the preexistent unity of subject and object, on nature, on the self-sufficient suchness of being, and on the daunting challenge of accepting transitoriness, as Peter Harris notes, are central themes in her poetry derived from Buddhism. Hirshfield does not, however, burden her poetry with heavy, overt Zen attitudes. Only occasionally is there any direct reference.

However, Hirshfield has expressed frustration in interviews with being labeled as a Buddhist poet.

Other reviewers note the investigative nature of Hirshfield's poems, in which life is approached as a puzzle which is not quite solvable. In a review of Come, Thief in The Georgia Review, Judith Kitchen wrote: "Jane Hirshfield's felt longing elevates description to insight: not self-knowledge, less fleeting than that... something more encompassing, more akin to the indefinable suddenly given expression."

In 1995, Stephen Yenser noted in The Yale Review Hirshfield's interest in the empirical: "The probably unspeakeable plenitude of the empirical world: Jane Hirshfield's poems recognize it at every point." In a Booklist starred review, Donna Seaman noted Hirshfield's "meticulous reasoning, including a striking meditation on the paradoxical richness of spareness that can serve as her ars poetica." In a 2023 piece in The Nation, published in conjunction with the appearance of Hirshfield's The Asking: New & Selected Poems, Wen Stephenson writes of Hirshfield as "among the most distinguished living poets in the English language."

Hirshfield's poems reflect her interest in science. In 2010, she was the Blue River Fellow in the H.J. Andrews Experimental Forest's Long Term Ecological Reflection project, whose goal is to track scientific research and artistic responses to the same sites for 200 years. She was the 2013 Hellman Visiting Artist in the neuroscience department at The University of California, San Francisco. She gave a talk at the 2023 Nobel Prize Foundation's Science Summit held at the National Academy of Sciences in Washington, D.C., and gave the 2024 Academy of American Poets Annual Blaney Lecture, "Making the Invisible Visible: Some Thoughts on Poetry and Science".

In 2017, Hirshfield organized a Poets For Science component for the March for Science held on Earth Day. As a main rally speaker, she read "On the Fifth Day", a poem protesting the January 2017 removal of scientific information from federal agency websites. The poem appeared on the front page of The Washington Post's Opinion Section a week before the march. Working with the Wick Poetry Center based at Kent State University in Ohio, Hirshfield arranged for a Poets For Science tent to be part of the teach-in preceding the march, in which scientists and their supporters were invited both to read and to write their own scientifically-grounded poems.

Hirshfield's work has been published in The New Yorker, Atlantic Monthly, The Nation, the Los Angeles Times, The Times Literary Supplement, The New York Times, the New York Review of Books, The Best American Poetry, and The Pushcart Prize Anthology. Her poems have been read on various NPR programs, and she was featured in two Bill Moyers PBS television specials, The Sounds of Poetry and Fooling With Words.

== Awards ==
Year	Nominated work	Award	Category	Result	Ref.
1988	Of Gravity and Angels	California Book Awards	Poetry	Silver medal	
1994	The October Palace	Poetry Center Book Award		Winner	
2001	Given Sugar, Given Salt	National Book Critics Circle Awards	Poetry	Finalist	
2006	After	T. S. Eliot Prize		Shortlist	
2012		Hall-Kenyon Prize in American Poetry		Winner	
2015	The Beauty	National Book Award	Poetry	Longlist	
2024		Zhongkun International Poetry Prize		Winner	

== Bibliography ==
=== Poetry ===
Collections

- Alaya. Quarterly Review of Literature. 1982. ISBN 9780614063974.
- Of Gravity & Angels. Wesleyan University Press. 1988. ISBN 9780819511386.
- The October Palace. HarperCollins. 1994. ISBN 978-0-06-096997-4.
- The Lives of the Heart. HarperCollins. 1997. ISBN 978-0-06-095169-6.
- Given Sugar, Given Salt. HarperCollins. 2001. ISBN 978-0-06-095901-2.
- Pebbles & Assays. Brooding Heron Press. 2004.
- Each Happiness Ringed by Lions. Bloodaxe Books. 2005. ISBN 978-1-85224-693-8.
- After. Bloodaxe Books. 2006. ISBN 978-1-85224-741-6.
- Come, Thief: Poems. Knopf Doubleday Publishing Group. 2013. ISBN 978-0-375-71207-4.
- minus/my-ness. Missing Links Press. 2014. ISBN 978-0-9899228-3-8.
- The Beauty: Poems. Knopf Doubleday Publishing Group. 2015. ISBN 978-0-385-35108-9.
- Ledger: Poems. Knopf Doubleday Publishing Group. 2020. ISBN 978-0-525-65780-4.
- The Asking: New and Selected Poems. Knopf Doubleday Publishing Group. 2023. ISBN 9780593535950.

Poems

Title	Year	First published	Reprinted/collected in
In a kitchen where mushrooms were washed	2011	Hirshfield, Jane (Fall 2011). "In a kitchen where mushrooms were washed". Ploughshares. 37 (2&3).	Hirshfield, Jane (2013). "In a kitchen where mushrooms were washed". In Henderson, Bill (ed.). The Pushcart Prize XXXVII : best of the small presses 2013. Pushcart Press. p. 295.
Husband	2015	Hirshfield, Jane (April 13, 2015). "Husband". The New Yorker. 91 (8): 48.	
Engraving: World-Tree with an Empty Beehive on One Branch	2016	Hirshfield, Jane (June 12, 2016). "Engraving: World tree with an empty beehive on one branch". The New York Times T Magazine.	
Tin	2021	Hirshfield, Jane (September 13, 2021). "Tin". The New Yorker. 97 (28): 65.	

=== Non-fiction ===
- Komachi, Ono no; Shikibu, Izumi (1990). Hirshfield, Jane; Aratani, Mariko (eds.). The ink dark moon : love poems by Ono no Komachi and Izumi Shikibu, women of the ancient Court of Japan. Vintage Classics.
- Hirshfield, Jane, ed. (1994). Women in praise of the sacred : forty-three centuries of spiritual poetry by women. Vintage Classics.
- Jane Hirshfield (August 26, 1998). Nine Gates: Entering the Mind of Poetry. HarperCollins. ISBN 978-0-06-092948-0.
- Robert Bly; Jane Hirshfield, eds. (2004). Mirabai: Ecstatic Poems. Beacon Press. ISBN 978-0-8070-6386-6.
- The Heart of Haiku (Kindle Single, 2011)
- Ten Windows: How Great Poems Transform the World. Knopf Doubleday Publishing Group. March 17, 2015. ISBN 978-0-385-35106-5.
