= Femi Elufowoju Jr. =

British Nigerian actor, performer, and director (born 1962)

Femi Elufowoju Jr. OBE
- Born: Elugbaju Oluyinka Oluwafemi; 31 October 1962 (age 64); Hammersmith, London, United Kingdom
- Education: University of Ife; University of Leeds; London South Bank University
- Occupations: Actor, performer and director
- Awards: South Bank Sky Arts Awards

Oluwafemi Elufowoju Jr. OBE (/ˈfɛmi ɛˌlʊfəˈwɒdʒuː/ FEM-ee eh-LUU-fə-WOJ-oo; born 31 October 1962) is a British-born, Nigerian-raised performance practitioner working across the creative industries. After Alton Kumalo, founder of Temba Theatre Company, Elufowoju is the second theatre director of African descent to establish a national touring company in the UK (Tiata Fahodzi, 1997). Elufowoju's stage work has been seen across most key flagship production houses in the UK, and has collaborated extensively with notable creatives within the film, television and radio sectors.

Elufowoju was appointed Officer of the Order of the British Empire (OBE) in the 2023 Birthday Honours for services to drama.

== Early life and education ==
Elufowoju was born Oluyinka Oluwafemi on 31 October 1962 in Hammersmith, London, to Nigerian parents from Ile-Ife. He attended Copenhagen Primary & Junior School, Islington, from 1967 to 1974, before moving to Nigeria. He attended Sacred Heart Primary School, Ring Road, Ibadan, in 1975, and Christ's School, Ado Ekiti (1975–80), before A-level studies at Oyo State College of Arts and Science in 1980.

He read law at the University of Ife (now Obafemi Awolowo University) but was advised to withdraw in 1985 just before returning to the UK. He attended North London College, where he received a Certificate in Community Theatre. In 1990, he obtained a bachelor's degree in Dramatic Arts from Bretton Hall College of the University of Leeds. Between 2010 and 2012, Elufowoju took a career break to attend South Bank University and concentrate on a postgraduate degree in Education.

== Theatre ==
In the summer of 1995, Mehmet Ergen invited Elufowoju to headline a season of African plays at the Southwark Playhouse. The play that later turned out to be the young director's debut production was Mauritian author San Cassimally's Acquisitive Case. The production led to Elufowoju securing a Regional Theatre Young Director bursary from Channel 4 and the Cameron Mackintosh Foundation to train as a theatre director under Philip Hedley at the Theatre Royal Stratford East.

The following year, after a ground-breaking tour of Sweden with his second production (and first written play) Tickets and Ties: The African Tale, billed as "the biggest and most ambitious West African show", Elufowoju established Tiata Fahodzi, a national touring theatre company, its core mission statement being to demonstrate the African experience on the British stage. He artistically led the company for 13 years, directing and presenting more than thirty plays, including his productions of Ola Rotimi's The Gods Are Not to Blame and Oladipo Agboluaje's Iya-Ile: The First Wife (nominated for the Olivier Award). During the same period, Elufowoju served as an Associate directing plays at the Almeida Theatre, Royal Court Theatre, West Yorkshire Playhouse, and the New Wolsey Theatre in Ipswich.

In 2016, he directed Bonnie Greer's The Hotel Cerise, again at Theatre Royal Stratford East, as well as at the British premiere of Blues for an Alabama Sky by American playwright Pearl Cleage at the Royal Academy of Dramatic Art.

In 2019, Elufowoju directed Bim Adewunmi's Hoard, written for BBC Arts and Avalon as part of an initiative to encourage writers from genres outside of theatre to write for the stage.

His interpretation of The Glass Menagerie by Tennessee Williams, described as a "radical new reimagining", was produced in May 2019 for Watford Palace Theatre and Arcola Theatre.

For Fuel Theatre, Elufowoju directed an adaptation of Antoine de Saint-Exupéry's The Little Prince in the spring of 2020. It previewed in London, Manchester and Coventry before being aborted before the pandemic.

As part of Manchester's Halle Orchestra 2021 spring season, Sir Mark Elder invited Annabel Arden and Elufowoju to direct a staged performance of Stravinsky's 1918 masterpiece The Soldier's Tale, read, played, and danced by three actors, a dancer and seven instrumentalists. The film marked Elufowoju's debut as a film director.

== Radio ==
In 2010, Elufowoju commenced a freelance career, producing and directing several dramas for BBC Radio 3 and BBC Radio 4, including Rex Obano's Burned to Nothing, Sam Soko's The New Bwana, Chinonyeram Odimba's Eve and the seminal Stages of Independence for BBC World Service, a celebration of 50 years of African drama throwing a spotlight on 50 years of Africa's Independence. In 2021, Elufowoju returned to the BBC to direct Rex Obano's City College for Radio 3 and in 2022 directed Diran Adebayo's radio serialization of his debut novel, Some Kind of Black.

== Film ==
As part of Manchester's Halle Orchestra 2021 spring season, Sir Mark Elder invited Annabel Arden and Elufowoju to direct a staged performance of Stravinsky's 1918 masterpiece The Soldier's Tale. Read, played, and danced by three actors, a dancer and seven instrumentalists. The film marked Elufowoju's debut as a film director.

- Mechanic: Resurrection (2016), as Krill

== Opera ==
In January 2022, Elufowoju made his opera debut as a director with Giuseppe Verdi's Rigoletto, for Opera North in Leeds. The production, which featured Eric Greene, Roman Arndt, Jasmine Habersham, and Sir Willard White, garnered five-star reviews, with The Daily Telegraph hailing Elufowoju's production as "a bold and innovative staging that will still be talked about 16 years from now". The Guardian's four-star review spoke of Elufowoju's debut as being "so powerful and so current and at the same time so true to the artistic force of Verdi's setting of Victor Hugo that it is somehow surprising that it has taken until now for someone to put it on the stage." The production went on to win Best Opera at the 2023 South Bank Sky Arts Awards

Elufowoju's second opera (updated with a new German libretto) is the 1780 French opera Der Anonyme Liebhaber (The Anonymous Lover), the story based on the life and music of relatively unknown 18th-century classical composer Joseph Bologne, Chevalier de Saint-Georges. The production was produced for Konzert und Theater St Gallen in Switzerland, and had its European premiere in September 2022.

== The Elufowoju Jr Ensemble ==
In 2015, Thomas Kell and Elufowoju set up The Elufowoju jr Ensemble with a view to creating exceptional world-class African theatre with imaginative flair for the international stage.

Elufowoju in the summer of 2018 directed a stage adaptation of Lola Shoneyin's The Secret Lives of Baba Segi's Wives in a full co-production with the Arcola Theatre. He received the 2019 Offie for Best Director. The production was noted for being the highest grossing box-office show in the entire 20-year history of the Arcola. In the same year, the production returned to Nigeria under the aegis of Sourmash Stories Productions (Teniola Olatoni Ojigbede producing) as the theatre segment for the Aké Festival 2018. The BBC subsequently commissioned Elufowoju to adapt a new dramatization for Radio 3, which was broadcast in November 2019.

== 54.60 Africa ==
In 2015, Elufowoju embarked on a mission of a lifetime: to visit all fifty-four countries in the continent of Africa. The project, titled 54.60 Africa, ended in October 2022. The overall objective remains for Elufowoju (under the aegis of his theatre company), to publish a book and playtext chronicling his pan-African odyssey. In February, May and October 2021, with funding from Arts Council England, preliminary theatre workshops and presentations exploring potentials for a future theatre production took place at the Hackney Showroom, Bernie Grant Arts Centre and Omnibus Theatre. 54.60 Africa recently received support from the Generate Programme for further development under the aegis of the National Theatre Studio.

== Performance ==
Elufowoju's notable television appearances include in the much lauded BBC comedy series Little Miss Jocelyn as Mr Omwokpopopo, serial dramas Moses Jones, Wire in the Blood, Borgen, Enterprice, Year of the Rabbit, Silent Witness, and the first two seasons of Sex Education. His film credits include The Legend of 1900, Mechanic: Resurrection, The Saint and The Princess Switch 3 with Vanessa Hudgens. His earlier stage performances include productions for Midlands based Theatre Foundry, Welsh company Theat Iolo, Manchester’s Royal Exchange, Told by an Idiot, Commonweal, Eastern Angles, Talawa Theatre Company, Royal Court, National Theatre and most recently, a world tour of Lionboy (including Broadway) with Complicité.

== Affiliated work in the arts ==
Between 1999 and 2006, Elufowoju joined Yvonne Brewster, Graham Whybrow, Roland Rees and Mustapha Mutura respectively on the judging committee for the Alfred Fagon Award. In 2003, Elufowoju was appointed Segment Director facilitating the Commonwealth Parade (The Mall Pageant) on the occasion of the Golden Jubilee Celebrations of Her Majesty Queen Elizabeth II. In 2019, The Royal Commonwealth Society on behalf of the Duchess of Cornwall invited Elufowoju jr to be one of the Final Panel Judges for The Queen's 2019 Commonwealth Essay Competition. Elufowoju reprised this role again in 2021. He continues to deliver workshops in UK schools and consult from time to time, with higher institutions including Yale University in the US.

== Activism ==
Since 1990, Elufowoju has been a member of Equity, a British trade union for the performing arts and entertainment industries. In 2020, he was elected on to the Race Equality Committee which advises the Equity Council on equal opportunities matters and discrimination on the grounds of race.

== Nigeria ==
Elufowoju has spent periods returning to his ancestral home Nigeria, building alliances with notable creative cultural leaders including Governor Kayode Fayemi, Lola Shoneyin Akin Adejuwon, Efe Paul Azino, ex-Governor Kayode Fayemi and theatre impresarios Bolanle Austen Peters and Teniola Olatoni Ojigbede.

== Awards and nominations ==
Award	Year	Work	Category	Result
Afro Hollywood	2000	Contribution to African Film, Arts and Culture	Lifetime Achievement	Won
Laurence Olivier	2009	Iya-Ile: The First Wife	Best Production in an affiliated theatre	Nominated
Ogeyinka Merit	2010	African film and theatre industries	Best theatre practitioner	Won
NEL UK	2011	Celebrating Nigerian excellence and lifestyle	Outstanding Achievement in theatre	Won
Nigerian Centenary	2014	International contribution to the arts	100 Top Nigerians in the UK	Won
Offie	2019	The Secret Lives of Baba Segi’s Wives	Best Director	Won
Voice of the Listener and Viewer	2021	City College	Best BBC Audio Drama	Nominated
South Bank Sky Arts Awards	2022	Rigoletto	Best Opera Production	Won
