= Government College, Ibadan =

All boys college in Ibadan, Nigeria

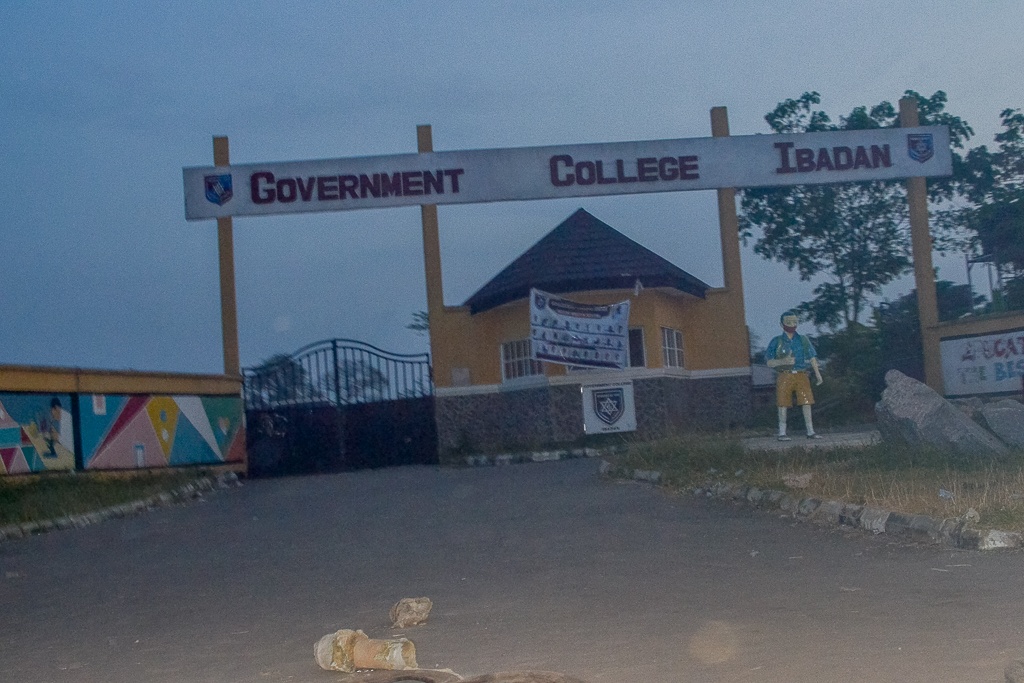
Government College Ibadan

Government College Ibadan (founded 28 February 1929) is a boys' secondary school located on the hills of Apata Ganga in Ibadan, Nigeria.

== History ==
The founding fathers of Government College Ibadan were Selwyn MacGregor Grier, Director of Education, Southern Provinces, who conceived the idea of the school, and E. R. Swanston, Inspector of Education. The school was conceived and founded on 28 February 1929. The first principal was C. E. Squire, the second principal was H. T. C. Field, while V. B. V. Powell was the third principal.

Government College was modelled on the British public boarding schools of the era, and the first set of students was numbered 29. During the Second World War, the school temporarily moved to several sites before finally resettling back at its original site. The alumnus popularly called Old Boys, holds an annual reunion event in order to properly connect and reconnect with former Old Boys. The giant school has 11 key Old boys as board of Trustees including SAN Lawyer Wale Babalakin as its Present Chairman.

== Administrative Control ==
The school offers both junior secondary and senior secondary education where it is being managed by each independent administrative control i.e. Principal and Vice Principal. While both schools has its own independent academic control, there is a unified governing body that oversees the whole affairs of Government College, Ibadan, where it consists of each independent control from each school having Engr. Femi Babalola as the Chairman, GCI School Governing Board.

== Curriculum ==
All students were required to complete a number of core courses in the arts and sciences. The courses were designed so that all students, no matter what their strengths were, obtained the basic skills of critical thinking, effective writing, effective oral communication, library literacy, laboratory competency, creative thinking and problem solving. The school offers present day junior and senior secondary academic curriculum.

The school was also known for cricket and field hockey. The school also has an Officer Cadet Corps that offers instruction camps in precision field drills, adventure training and the cadets are introduced to the principles of meritocracy.

== Laurels in academics ==
In the period before the dissolution of the country's Western Region, the school earned the fame of being the best secondary school in Nigeria. It had well-resourced classrooms and laboratories. As the school grew in numbers of students, in reputation and in fame, its students achieved consistently high scores for exam results at O-level and A-level. In the 1960s, more than 78% distinctions were obtained by Government College students in the external examinations, an unprecedented achievement in Nigeria. In the decade of the 1970s the school upheld its records in both the academic and extracurricular fields. The school has produced more than 80% of the presidents of the Nigerian Society of Engineers since its inception, and one of the only four Africans to be awarded a Nobel Prize.

== School houses ==
- Carr House (Orange)
- Field House (Green)
- Grier House (Maroon)
- Powell House (Purple)
- Swanston House (Blue)

== Notable alumni ==
- Adegoke Adelabu (1915–1958), distinguished politician
- Akinola Aguda (1923–2001), first Chief Justice of Botswana
- T. M. Aluko (1918–2010), eminent scholar and author
- Segun Awolowo (born 1963), Lawyer & Businessman
- Wale Babalakin (born 1960), Lawyer & President GCIOBA
- Cyprian Ekwensi (1921–2007), distinguished author
- Erediauwa, (1923–2016), King of Benin, Nigeria
- Abel Guobadia (1932–2011), Ambassador, former Chairman, Independent National Electoral Commission
- Christopher Kolade (born 1932), Nigerian Ambassador to the United Kingdom
- Ifedayo Oladapo (1932–2010), University Vice-Chancellor
- Victor Omololu Olunloyo (born 1935), former Governor of Oyo State
- Femi Osofisan (born 1946), Professor of Theater Arts
- Ayo Rosiji (1917–2000), industrialist, former Minister of Labour
- Olaokun Soyinka (born 1958), Medical Doctor
- Wole Soyinka (born 1934), first African literary Nobel Laureate
- Rasheed Sarumi (1966), entrepreneur and philanthropist
