= Yoruba Name Project =

Cultural documentation project

Yoruba Names Project
- Mission statement: "The transfer of language and cultural resources of Yoruba language into a publicly accessible online format"
- Commercial?: No
- Type of project: Crowdsourced online dictionary
- Products: YorubaNames.com; YorubaWords.com
- Location: University of Ibadan
- Founder: Kola Olatubosun
- Country: Nigeria
- Established: 19 February 2019; 7 years ago
- Status: Active
- Website: www.yorubaname.com

The Yoruba Names Project is a documentation project set up to ensure the transfer of language and cultural resources of Yoruba language into a publicly accessible online format. It was launched on February 19, 2016.

== Origin ==
The project was first conceived in 2005 as an undergraduate thesis in the Department of Linguistics and African Language, University of Ibadan, Nigeria by Kola Tubosun then an undergraduate. At the time, the database, called "A Multimedia Dictionary of Yoruba Names" only had about 1000 names curated on a compact disk, with meaning and pronunciation.

In January, 2015, over $5000 was raised via a successful Indiegogo crowdfunding campaign to support a larger effort to document all the names of Yoruba people in Nigeria and all over the world. As at January 2018, there are 6019 names in the dictionary.

== Aims and description ==
The Yoruba Names Project is set up to help document the Yoruba language first through all the names borne by its people, and later through an online dictionary.

It is part of a larger effort to help document the African cultural experience on the internet by making them easy to write and access via information technology.

The project also aims to bring together a community of interested linguists and other culture enthusiasts to help facilitate the use of these languages on the internet through the creation of relevant tools and applications.

The first effort at YorubaName.com is a crowdsourced database for Yoruba names everywhere (in Nigeria and elsewhere on the globe) where individuals and users are able to submit their name on the website or use the current database to search for meanings of other specific names.

== Project advancement ==
=== Launch ===
The project was first publicly presented at Goethe Institut, Lagos, on February 24, 2015 during the Social Media Week.

The web application was launched online in its beta version on February 19, 2016.

On May 30, 2016, the team made the codebase of the project available online at GitHub as a way to allow other software developers have access to the tools in order to create similar projects for different languages.

On June 26, the project was featured on the Chimurenga (magazine) Space Radio at Freedom Park, Lagos.

In July 2016, the project was publicly presented at the Institute of African Studies, University of Ibadan, with the support of the Institute of French Research in Africa (IFRA) to students and professors alike. The event "was attended by a motivated and very reactive public of professors and students of all levels. After the presentation, the conveners facilitated an interactive workshop, followed then by the screening of the documentary Family Name (USA, 1998) by Macky Alston, organised by the Thursday Films Series movie club."

=== Yoruba and Igbo language keyboards ===
On August 8, 2015, the YorubaName team released Yorùbá Keyboard layouts for Mac and Windows to allow its users type in Yorùbá in anticipation of the dictionary itself.

An update for Igbo language was released in July 2016. Of the effort, Laila le Guen, the keyboard project supervisor, said "the keyboard enables users to type English, Yorùbá and Igbo without switching language preference settings. The key combinations to type characters such as ṣ or á are easy to memorise which makes for a fast learning process." The update was also for Mac and Windows.

=== Lukumi and French Yoruba Inclusion ===
On October 15, 2015, the first blog post on Yoruba names from the Republic of Benin was published. It featured names from the Sabe group of Yoruba speakers in the country. The blog post, written by Dr. Moufoutaou Adjeran, a sociolinguistics lecturer at Abomey-Calavi University (Republic of Benin), was the first indication of the presence of Yoruba names from Benin Republic in the Yoruba Name Dictionary project, curated by Laila le Guen.

On August 31, 2016, it was announced that Yoruba names from a Cuban variant of Yorùbá-derived ritual lexicon called Lucumi (or Lukumi) are being added to the dictionary. This is achieved with collaboration with Puerto Rican babaláwo / olórìṣà and scholar Nathan Lugo who, by his knowledge of Lukumi lexicon and Yoruba language phonology and use, is able to provide relevant information about names to users from both sides of the Atlantic.

=== TTS-Yoruba and Audio Element ===
On October 21, 2017, the audio element of the dictionary, created by speech synthesis, was announced in a blog post, and described as being part of a dream to create "interesting speech synthesis applications that can enhance African languages in technology." The work was supported by a crowdfunding effort started on March 13, 2016

In a blog post explaining the motivation, Kola Tubosun explains that the effort is "an attempt to solve an old problem" but also "a push to achieve an important leap towards proper integration of African languages into the information technology age." In an interview with OkayAfrica, he added that the motivation includes the fact that "African languages have been left out, for too long in global conversations in technology... because we don’t care." One of the overarching purposes of the new project is "to show that more can be done for any African language, and more should be done... (since) one of the ways to keep a language from being endangered is not only to speak it to our children, but also to have them capable of adapting to changing times, in this case with technology."

== YorubaWord.com ==
In April 2018, the project proposed to build the first multimedia Yoruba language dictionary on the internet, using the same open-source model it had used for YorubaName.com in the past. The project will be hosted at YorubaWord.com

== Yorùbá Voice ==
In April 2022, the Yorùbá Names Project was awarded a €20,000 grant to create "Yorùbá Voice", a 50-hour speech data set that will help create speech tools in Yorùbá, like text-to-speech, speech recognition, and others.

== Team ==
The project is led by writer and linguist Kola Tubosun and supported by a team of volunteer web developers, language scholars, linguists, web designers and other culture enthusiasts. Other members of the team include Dadepo Aderemi, Laila Le Guen, Koko Godswill, Esther Olatunde, among many others. The work of the team includes lexicography and management, and support for other projects of this nature in other languages in the country or around the continent.

The project has also got support from Tunde Adegbola of the African Language Technology Initiative, Goethe-Institut, Lagos, the Ooni of Ife Adeyeye Enitan Ogunwusi, and Nobel Laureate Wole Soyinka.

== Response ==
The Yoruba Name project has received positive response and support during its start-up phase, ranging from interviews in prominent publications to an endorsement from renowned Nigerian film producer Tunde Kelani. The homepage of the dictionary currently features a quote by the current Ooni of Ife, Oba Adeyeye Enitan Ogunwusi.

On June 13, 2017, Nobel Laureate Wole Soyinka endorsed the work, saying "Despite the efforts of a handful of pioneers, Yoruba language is still poorly served... advances in software technology notwithstanding. This new initiative promises a quantum leap in finally leveling up with the intrinsic dynamics of this vehicle for a culture that is increasingly acknowledged as one of the richest in the world."

== Collaborations ==
The project, in December 2017, released a free multilingual audio course in collaboration with the Orisha Image Blog called Yoruba Melody. The course, which was made available in Portuguese, Spanish, and English, "includes 22 unique lessons, covering everything from greetings, compliments and climate to health, appointments, eating and drinking, time and much, much more." A German version is also being planned.
