= Jumoké Fashola =

British broadcaster, singer and actor

- Born: Jumoké Fashola
- Occupations: Broadcaster, singer and actor

Jumoké Fashola is a British broadcaster, singer and actor.

== Career ==
Fashola has presented various programs for the BBC including jazz show J to Z BBC Radio 3. In addition, she authored and presented the documentary series Black African and British for BBC Radio 4.

As a vocalist, Fashola released her debut jazz album, The Condition of Being a Woman in 2014.

Fashola has appeared in television and stage productions. Her credits include the ITV drama series Riches (2022) and the stage play The Secret Lives of Baba Segi's Wives at the Arcola Theatre. She also performed in the play The High Table in 2020.
