= Nigerian English =

Variety of English spoken in Nigeria

- Region: Nigeria
- Language family: Indo-European: Germanic; West Germanic; Ingvaeonic; Anglo-Frisian; Anglic; English; African English; Nigerian English
- Early forms: Proto-Indo-European: Proto-Germanic; Old English; Middle English; Early Modern English; 19th century British English
- Writing system: Latin (English alphabet); Unified English Braille

Official status
- Official language in: Nigeria

Language codes
- ISO 639-3: –
- Glottolog: sout3331
- IETF: en-NG

Speech example
Chimamanda Ngozi Adichie, a Nigerian writer.

Nigerian English, also known as Nigerian Standard English (en-NG), is a variety of English spoken in Nigeria. Based on British English, the dialect contains various loanwords and collocations from the native languages of Nigeria, due to the need to express concepts specific to the cultures of ethnic groups in the nation (e.g. senior wife).

Nigerian Pidgin, a pidgin derived from English, is mostly used in informal conversations, but Nigerian Standard English is used in politics, formal education, the media, and other official uses.

== Dialects ==
There are three main dialects of Nigerian English: Hausa English (spoken by the Hausa), Igbo English (spoken by the Igbo) and Yoruba English (spoken by the Yoruba). Nigerian Pidgin English is very commonly spoken in the South-South region of Nigeria, such as in Rivers, Delta, or Bayelsa States. It is spoken alongside the corresponding dialectical renderings of Nigerian English, which exists in mediated form throughout all of Nigeria and on an anecdotal, social level are arguably far better-known than the Hausa rendering of it.

Although Hausa, Igbo and Yoruba happen to be the three main political entities of Nigeria (based on population-numbers), pidgin English, a local 'patois' that represents a casual variation of Nigerian English, is known to be far more characteristic of the South-South region of Nigeria than anywhere else in the country.

It is more concentrated than the pidgin spoken in the city of Lagos, which is occasionally seen as merely an urban-Yoruba-mediated version of Nigerian English. Warri, Sapele, Port Harcourt and Bini City are examples of major Nigerian cities where truly concentrated pidgin English is spoken, especially relative to others.

== Sociocultural implications ==
Nigerian English is a nativised form of English. Like South African English, its nativisation and development as a New World English corresponds roughly with the period of colonisation by Britain and afterward. Nigerian English became a nativised language that functions uniquely within its own cultural context.

Nigerian English has long been a controversial idea in that the idea of a "Standard Nigerian English" (SNE) is difficult to establish, considering the fossilisation that has occurred in the formal instruction of English in many regions of Nigeria, for a variety of factors largely including "interference, lack of facilities, and crowded classrooms".

Contact between British Standard English and Nigerian English, which have two very different sets of grammatical, pronunciation, and spelling rules has caused there to arise a predominant occurrence of "faulty analogy", the assumption that because one grammatical feature resembles another in usage, the rules applying to the former also apply to the latter, in what Okoro refers to as "substandard" varieties of Nigerian English.

A few features have united across communities that bridge the differences between different varieties even within Nigerian English, all pertaining to cultural values that are expressed uniquely in English terms. Two prevalent examples are "sorry" and "sir". The literal meaning of "sorry" usually indicates some sort of responsibility on the part of the person saying it, but for all varieties of Nigerian English, it is used to express sympathy in a unique way, or to show empathy to whoever has experienced misfortune. "Sir" or the replacement of names with titles indicates respect and a high value for politeness. The tacking on of "sir" to another title ("Professor sir") illustrates a greater level of prestige than normal or an instance of being more polite than the norm.

Though the exact levels of Nigerian English usage are contested, one suggestion indicates there are four levels of usage within the nativised, but not indigenous English:

- Level 1: Pidgin, spoken as the casual language
- Level 2: A step above, and the most spoken. Spoken by those with elementary education
- Level 3: Marked by more expansive lexicon, fluency and use of the features that Level 1 speakers "avoid" spoken by those with "secondary education"
- Level 4: Proposed as the NSE as its features are very similar (but still characteristically Nigerian) "to Standard English", spoken by those with a college education

The system of levels is only one of the proposed differentiations of the pragmatic realisations of Nigerian English. Because of the nature of its presence in Nigeria, the English language has been a point of contention among Nigerian residents who strive for a more nativisitic lifestyle, returning to the predominant speech of indigenous languages of Nigeria. However, the nature of the introduction and the role of English in exerting the values of colonisation on a post-colonial Nigeria have caused some to call English inseparable from the nature of language in the region.

=== Lexico-semantic innovations ===
There are three basic subsets of innovations that have occurred as a result of the nativisation of English in Nigeria: "loanwords, coinages, and semantic shifts".

==== Loanwords ====
A loanword is defined by the Oxford Dictionary as "a word adopted from a foreign language with little or no modification". Nigerian English has a plethora of loanwords that have no direct English equivalents but have rooted themselves into the dialect with a unique meaning. The examples below of prominent Nigerian English loanwords are provided by Grace Ebunlola (quoting them):

- agbada: a kind of flowing dress for men, especially among the Yoruba: ‘Chief Ogini wore agbada to the wedding ceremony.’
- babariga: a kind of long, loose dress for men, especially among the Hausas: ‘I really like your babariga.’
- akara: an item of food, also referred to as ‘bean cake’
- akamu pap: a kind of corn porridge: ‘This morning I ate akara and akamu.’
- akpu, banga, eba, egusi, ogbono, tuwo: ‘soup’ (in various Nigerian languages), as in: ‘Any time I eat eba, I have stomach upset’; ‘Can I eat some tuwo?’; ‘I don’t like the smell of akpu’; ‘I will like to eat ogbono soup mixed with egusi.’ Akpu and ogbono are clearly derived from the Igbo language, tuwo Hausa. Banga is mostly synonymous with Delta State (although similar dishes made with the same primary ingredient; i.e., palm fruit concentrate; exist around Nigeria, e.g., Igbo ofe akwu, Ibibio-Efik abak atama, Isoko izuwo ibiedi, Itsekiri obe eyin-ikpogiri (banga-egusi soup). One-pot banga rice is known as adesi abak in Ibibio-Efik and is often prepared with seafood. The origins of the word "banga" per-se appear to be unknown but it may be a local loanword. Akamu is a shared word between Yoruba and Igbo and it appears probable that egusi is, too.
- danfo, okada: a mode of transportation: ‘You either go by danfo or you take an okada.’
- adakaji, oba: chieftaincy titles, as in: ‘The Adakaji II was at the coronation of the oba of Lagos.’

==== Coinages ====
Coinages, though similar to loanwords, function as a sort of colloquialism that is spoken in English but has a unique cultural meaning. These are also especially prolific in Nigerian English. Compared to loanwords, coinages typically have a short lifespan and are adopted for unique cultural purposes of the present, and as such, die out quickly after their acquisition.

Examples are provided by Abdullahi-Idiagbon and Olaniyi:

- Long-leg (meaning "well-connected")
- Free and fair
- Come of age
- Carpet crossing (equivalent to crossing the floor in the UK)
- No-go area
- Man of timber and calibre
- Money-bag
- Political juggernaut/Heavyweight
- Political bride (a coalition partner or running mate)
- Accord Concordia
- Bottom power (woman using her sexuality as a bargaining chip)

Other coinages include:

- barbing salon ("barbershop" outside of Nigeria)
- ember months (last 4 months of the calendar year)
- next tomorrow (the day after tomorrow)
- flag-off (also used in India)
- gist
- buka (refers to a roadside restaurant or street stall that sells local fare at low prices)

Coinages are not the same as acronyms, though Nigerian English also has unique acronyms.

Acronyms serve a variety of functions, and follow the same rules as Standard English acronyms: the first letters are taken from each word in a phrase (especially titles of office, agencies of the government, etc.).

==== Semantic shifts ====
A number of terms in Nigerian English have had their meanings diverge from British English.

For example, in some areas, despite the international meaning of "trek" having a connotation of a long distance or difficult journey, the Nigerian usage means "walk a short distance".

A particularly expansive example of semantic shift in NE is the use of a variety of greetings. Those greetings reflect Nigerian culture. For example, the saying "goodnight, ma" can be said regardless of time of day and functions simply as an assumption that the person in question will not be seen until the next day. That has especially been noticed in Yoruba culture.

== Phonology ==
As the literature currently stands, most phonological studies have analysed a plethora of Nigerian English speakers from a wide range of backgrounds (region of origin, current profession, social class, etc.). There has been special focus on such regions as those pertaining to the Hausa, Igbo, and Yoruba, respectively. Nigerian English can be thought of in a similar way to American English in this approach: just as in American English, Nigerian English varies from region to region, and as such, phonological variables are realised in different ways in different regions.

Some common features across Nigerian Englishes include:

- Voiced -z sounds in which the "s" is present in spelling become voiceless, i.e. "boys" is pronounced /ˈbɔɪs/.
- Because voiced palato-alveolar fricative /ʒ/ is not present in most Nigerian varieties, any words including this phoneme are converted into the -sh /ʃ/ sound, such as in the word "conclusion", pronounced /kənˈkluːʃən/ in NE.
- Common suffixing of phrases with the word “now”, especially when making an example of something. E.g. (1): “like you, now” (take you/yourself as an example), “for example now” (for example), “say you’re the one who’s going to be celebrating the birthday tomorrow evening now” (suppose for a minute that it’s your birthday tomorrow and you’re having some party/celebration). E.g. (2): “let me not even put mouth now” (I don’t want to end up saying something I regret so I won’t talk too much about it, at least not yet); “you people should have told me that you’re coming, now” (I wish you’d have let me know that you were planning on visiting).

=== Prosody ===
Early studies have associated Nigerian English with being syllable-timed rather than stress-timed, but the dialect has thus far evaded specific grouping in either category. Milde and Jan-Torsten suggest that Nigerian English is closer to a tonal language, akin to other West African tonal languages, but rather than tones being associated with stressed and unstressed syllables, they are associated with grammatical functions. They suggest that "articles, prepositions and conjunctions tend to have a low tone, whereas nouns, verbs and adjectives are usually produced with a high tone."

== Nigerian English in the Oxford English Dictionary ==
In its January 2020 update, the Oxford English Dictionary (OED) added 29 entries drawn from Nigerian English, some of which have been in use since the 1970s and 1980s.

The OED observed that "by taking ownership of English and using it as their own medium of expression, Nigerians have made, and are continuing to make, a unique and distinctive contribution to English as a global language."

Further inclusion of Nigerian English words in the OED occurred in the December 2024 update: over 20 additional Nigerian English words and expressions. These include terms such as abi, adire, eba, gele, Japa, Naija, suya, 419, yahoo boy, among others. The update also introduced pronunciation recordings by a Nigerian voice, many provided by Nigerian linguist Dr Kingsley Ugwuanyi, who serves as consultant to the OED on Nigerian English along with Kola Tubosun. Reflecting on the project, Ugwuanyi stated that his involvement was rewarding as it "reflects the vibrancy of our language and culture."

== Use in technology ==
In July 2019, Google announced its new Nigerian English accented voice for Maps, Google Assistant, and other Google products. It is based on work of speech synthesis created by a team at Google led by Nigerian linguist Kola Tubosun. In January 2020, Oxford English Dictionary added over two dozen new words of Nigerian English to the Oxford Dictionary.

In April 2024, Nigerian English gained attention for its stood out lexicon compared to other Englishes such as the frequent use of delve after a study by the Swinburne University of Technology analysing PubMed articles containing this word from 1990 to 2024 was highlighted by Paul Graham on Twitter who argued it as a marking indicator of text generation by ChatGPT. This was met with strong objection by Nigerians in his circle; further reports proposed this finding resulted from a large language model dataset outsourced to workers based in the country who write in this dialect.

== See also ==
- Commonwealth English
