= Wale Babalakin =

Nigerian businessman and lawyer (born 1960)

Wale Babalakin OFR SAN
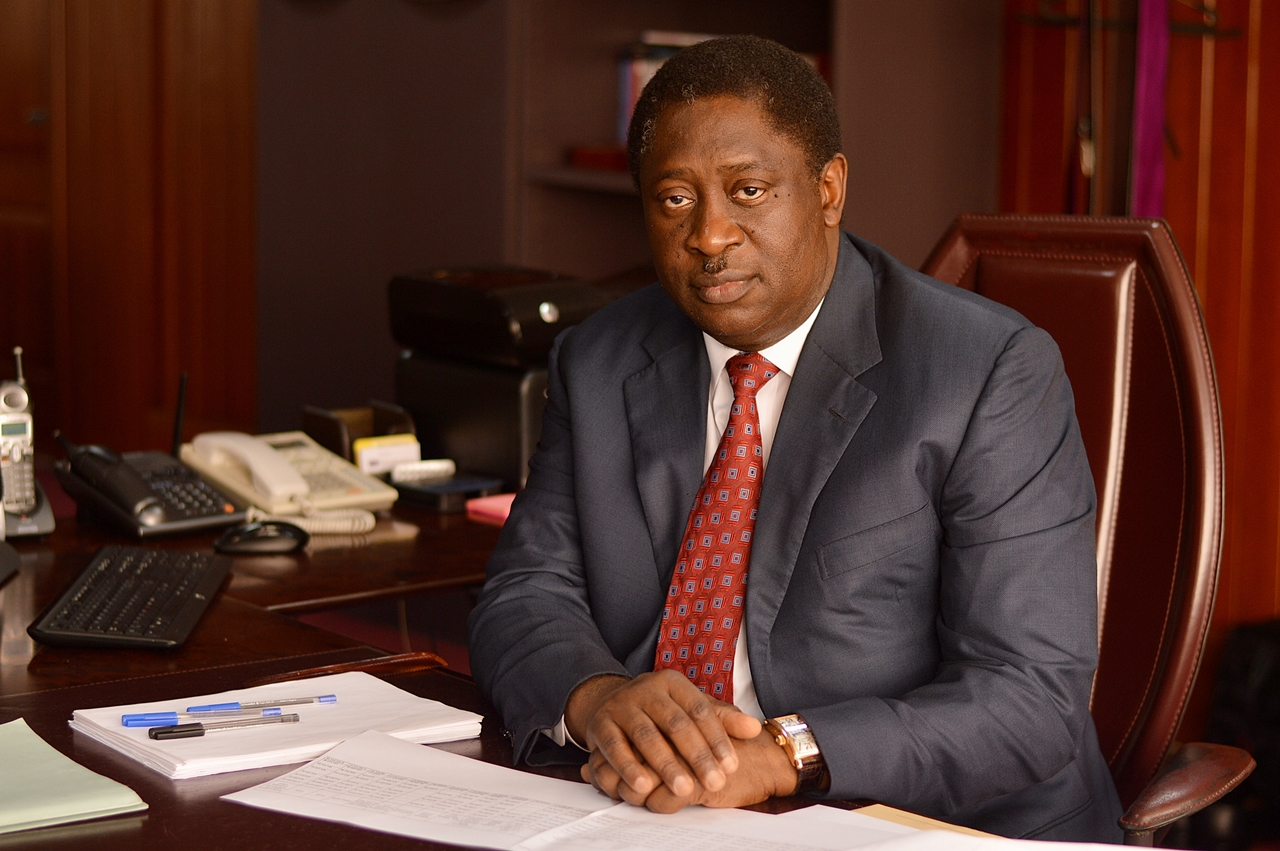
- Born: Bolanle Olawale Babalakin; 1 July 1960 (age 66); Ibadan, Western Region, British Nigeria (now in Oyo State, Nigeria)
- Education: University of Lagos; Cambridge University
- Occupations: Lawyer; businessman; philanthropist
- Spouse: Olugbolahan Babalakin
- Awards: Senior Advocate of Nigeria (SAN); Officer of the Federal Republic (OFR)

Bolanle Olawale Babalakin OFR SAN, (born 1 July 1960) is a Nigerian businessman, lawyer and philanthropist, and the chairman of The Bi-Courtney Group of companies. He is also a Senior Advocate of Nigeria (SAN), and received the Nigerian national honour of Officer of the Federal Republic (OFR) in 2007.

== Early life and education ==
Babalakin was born in Ibadan, Oyo State, in 1960. His father, Bolarinwa Oyegoke Babalakin, is a retired Justice of the Supreme Court of Nigeria, and his mother, Ramotu Ibironke Babalakin, was a hospital proprietress in Ibadan. He attended Sacred Heart Private School, then proceeded to Government College, Ibadan (GCI) for his secondary school education.

For his A-Levels, Babalakin attended The Polytechnic, Ibadan, and subsequently gained admission into the University of Lagos in 1978, where he graduated from the Faculty of Law in 1981. He proceeded to the Nigerian Law School and was called to the Nigerian Bar in 1982.

That same year (1982), Babalakin was one of only three Africans admitted into Corpus Christi College at Cambridge University for the Master of Laws (LLM) Degree. Although his academic programme was sponsored by his father, he applied for the Commonwealth Scholarship. Wale Babalakin was awarded the LLM degree in 1983, and proceeded immediately with his doctoral programme. He received his PhD in 1986, on the eve of his 26th birthday.

== Career ==
Returning to Nigeria in 1986, Babalakin joined the firm of his mentor, Chief Frederick Rotimi Williams, where he worked for one year, before establishing his own firm, Babalakin and Co. Apart from being a practitioner, he is also in the sphere of publishing of Law Reports. In 2009, the owners of Nigeria's first privately published Law Report, Optimum Law Publishers, which commenced in 1964, assigned their rights and interest in the Law Report to Babalakin and Co.

== Business ventures ==
Through his company, Bi-Courtney Limited, Babalakin applied for the concessioning of the Lagos Domestic Airport, the Murtala Mohammed Airport 2, after the old airport structure was razed by fire, and it was completed in three years.

Babalakin is also the Chairman of Stabilini Visinoni Limited, a Nigerian construction firm. His hospitality and leisure company, Resort International Limited, was in 2006 granted a Development Lease Agreement to convert the former Federal Secretariat in Ikoyi, Lagos, into luxury blocks of 480 flats, until work was stopped by the Lagos State Government a year later, in 2007, as well as the development of a 300-bed hotel at MMA2.

== Political career ==
In 2005, Babalakin was appointed by the Nigerian President, Chief Olusegun Obasanjo, as a member of the National Political Reforms Conference, where he served on the Legal Reforms Committee. He also served as the Chairman of the Constitution Drafting Sub Committee, which was responsible for the drafting of the constitution. He was the vice-chairman of the committee for the review of the Evidence Act. He also served as the chairman of two committees of the Nigerian Bar Association: the Real Estate and Construction Law Committee of the Section on Business Law and the Government Practice Committee of the Section on Legal Practice. He was appointed alongside Alhaji Rilwanu Lukman as Honorary Adviser to the government of President Umaru Musa Yar'Adua.

He has also served as:

- Pro-Chancellor and the Chairman of Council of the University of Maiduguri between 2009 and 2013.
- Chairman of the Committee of Pro-Chancellors of Federal Universities in Nigeria.
- Chairman of the Implementation Monitoring Committee of the Agreements entered into between the Federal Government of Nigeria and the various unions of the Nigerian Universities, including the Academic Staff Union of Universities in Nigeria (ASUU), SSANU, NAAT and NASU.
- Chairman of the Federal Government Committee to Re-negotiate the 2009 Agreement between Federal Government and the University Unions.
- Current Pro-Chancellor and Chairman of Council of the University of Lagos.

== Philanthropy ==
Babalakin donated an 80-bed hostel to the University of Ilorin in the name of his father, Justice Bolarinwa Oyegoke Babalakin, and another in Ibogun, Ogun State, in memory of his mother, Ramotu Ibironke Babalakin. He also donated a 500-seat auditorium to the Moshood Abiola Polytechnic in memory of his mother.

He treated 1,000 patients with various eye diseases in Aye daade Local Government, and a further 4,000 in Owo Local Government, under the foundation set up in memory of his late mother.

He runs an elaborate scholarship scheme in and out of Nigeria with over 200 students in Nigeria and over 40 students abroad.

== Honours ==
Babalakin was, in 2002, made a Senior Advocate of Nigeria (SAN). In 2007, he was conferred with the national honour of the Officer of the Federal Republic of Nigeria (OFR). On 21 December 2013, during the 90th anniversary of the Ansar Ud Deen Society of Nigeria, Babalakin, along with other dignitaries including the Lagos State governor, Babatunde Fashola (SAN), was awarded the Merit Award for his contribution to the society and humanity in general.

== Personal life ==
Babalakin is married to Olugbolahan Babalakin, also a lawyer. They have children.
