= Temie Giwa-Tubosun =

Nigerian-American health manager

Temie Giwa
- Born: Olúwalóní Ọlámidé Gíwá; December 1985 (age 40); Ila Orangun, Osun, Nigeria
- Other names: Temie Giwa, Temie Giwa-Tubosun, Oluwaloni Olatubosun
- Education: Minnesota State University Moorhead; Middlebury Institute of International Studies at Monterey
- Occupation: Health Entrepreneur
- Spouse: Kola Tubosun
- Website: www.lifebank.ng

Temie Giwa-Tubosun (born Oluwaloni Olamide Giwa, December 1985) is a Nigerian-American health manager, founder of LifeBank (formerly One Percent Project), a business enterprise in Nigeria working to improve access to blood transfusions in the country.

== Life story ==
Temie was born in Ila Orangun in Osun State Nigeria to a university professor and school teacher. She is the fourth of six children. Her name "Temie" came from the abridging of "Temitope", one of her birth names.

She grew up in Ila, Ilesha, and in Ibadan until she was fifteen. When she was ten, her parents won the US Diversity Immigrant Visa and left for the United States with the three older siblings. In 2001, at fifteen, she left to join them with her two younger siblings.

Temie attended Osseo Senior High School, Minnesota, and graduated in 2003. She then attended the Minnesota State University Moorhead and graduated in 2007. In 2008, she went to graduate school at Middlebury Institute of International Studies at Monterey from where she graduated in July 2010.

In 2009, after her first year in graduate school, she returned to Nigeria for the first time since 2001 to intern for Department for International Development at Paths2 in Abuja, Nigeria. The internship lasted three months during which she had an encounter with a poor mother called Aisha whose protracted labour convinced Giwa of the problem of maternal mortality among Nigerians.

In January 2010, she went for a graduate fellowship at the World Health Organization in Geneva, Switzerland, which lasted until July of that year when she graduated Middlebury Institute of International Studies at Monterey.

She worked briefly at Fairview Health Services in Minnesota in 2010.

In August 2011, she began a fellowship with the Global Health Corps, and spent the next year at Mbarara, Uganda, working with the Millennium Villages Project a project of the United Nations Development Programme and Millennium Promise.

== Full return to, and work in, Nigeria ==
In August 2012, Giwa returned to Nigeria. In September of that year, she got married at the University of Ibadan.

From February 2012 to October 2013, under the pen name "Temie Giwa", she wrote a weekly column on YNaija, a Nigerian youth-focused web magazine on the many issues facing the country. The column was titled What Works.

From December January 2013 to January 2014, Giwa worked with the Lagos State Office of Facility Management whose work included upgrading schools, monuments, hospitals, and other facilities managed by the State.

From June 2014 to October 2015, Giwa was Program Manager for Nollywood Workshops, an NGO set up by the Hollywood, Health & Society, and described as "a hub for filmmakers in Lagos, Nigeria that supports and delivers movie production and distribution, training, and research." In her role as Program Manager in August 2014, during the Ebola scare in Nigeria, Giwa helped supervise the production of Public Service Announcements created by the organisation in collaboration with Nollywood filmmakers, to better enlighten Nigerians about healthy ways to avoid being victims of Ebola.

== One Percent Project ==
On 21 May 2012, Temie founded a non-governmental organisation called "One Percent Blood Donation Enlightenment Foundation" or One Percent Project with the aim of ending blood shortage, educating people on the importance of blood donation for anyone in need of blood, to overcome fears, prejudice, myths and apathy of people on blood donation, and to increase an efficient distribution network of blood in blood banks in Nigeria. The founding board of trustees were Oluwaloni Olamide Giwa, Iyinoluwa Aboyeji, Mustapha Maruf Damilola, Oluwaseun Odewale, Akintunde Oyebode, Mary Oyefuga, Hezekiah Olayinka Shobiye, and Kolawole Olatubosun.

== LifeBank ==
In January 2016, Temie founded LifeBank, a business organisation set up to tackle the problem of blood shortage in Nigeria. LifeBank is a medical distribution company that uses data and technology to discover and deliver essential medical products to hospitals in Nigeria. The founding was inspired by the birth of her first child and the complications from that experience. The technology and logistics company is based in Lagos, and incubated at Co-Creation Hub in Yaba. As at January 2017, the company has helped deliver over 2000 pints of blood to patients across the state.

On 31 August 2016, she met with Mark Zuckerberg during his first visit to Nigeria. She was one of the two women Zuckerberg referenced in his town hall meeting the next day. Of her work, Zuckerberg had said, "If everyone had the opportunity to build something like this, then the world would be a better place... I've been to a lot of different cities... people around the world are trying to build stuff like that. If she actually pulls it off, then she'd show a model that will impact not just Lagos, not just Nigeria, but countries all around the world." In the meeting, Temie said to Quartz, "Mark's visit is validation for years of work and everything we're trying to do."

In the past four years, the company has distributed about 26,000 products to more than 10,000 patients in nearly 700 hospitals in Nigeria; Ms. Giwa-Tubosun's effort is now celebrated at home and abroad as an epitome of social entrepreneurship—using business to solve a major society's problem.

== Honours and invitations ==
=== BBC100 ===
In 2014 Giwa was listed as one of the BBC 100 Women. She was the third Nigerian on the list, along with veteran broadcaster Funmi Iyanda and Obiageli Ezekwesili, Nigeria's former minister of education. She was also the youngest on the list. She was described in the selection as someone "to take notice of now [and] in the future", making a difference around the world by the BBC.

=== TEDxEuston ===
In 2016, Giwa was invited to give a talk at the London-based TEDxEuston Salon event. Her talk was titled "Healthcare is a Right".

=== YNaija 100 ===
In March 2017, Giwa was named as one of the 100 Most Inspiring Women in Nigeria for 2017.

=== World Economic Forum Innovators ===
In May 2017, she was selected as part of "six entrepreneurs who demonstrate the positive role women are playing in creating opportunities and preparing the region for the Fourth Industrial Revolution" by the World Economic Forum on Africa.

=== Quartz African Innovators List ===
On 5 May 2017, Giwa was listed in the annual Quartz African Innovators List of "more than 30 Africans" who are "taking leadership and control in a wide range of fields including finance, healthcare, education, agriculture, design and many other fields."

=== Jack Ma's Africa Netpreneur Prize ===
On 16 November 2019, Giwa was named the winner of Jack Ma's Africa Netpreneur Prize which held in Accra, Ghana. The win for LifeBank was worth $250,000. The Prize got applications from more than 10,000 startups from 50 of Africa's 54 countries.

=== Global Citizen Prize ===
In December 2020, Giwa was awarded the Global Citizen Prize for Business Leader, for her work in addressing blood shortages in Nigeria, and LifeBank's work during the COVID-19 pandemic.

=== African Folder ===
In March 2023, Temie Giwa-Tubosun was named among the "15 African Female Founders You Should Know In 2023" by African Folder.

== Personal life ==
Temie lives in Lagos with her husband, Kola Tubosun who is a writer and linguist, and their son, Eniafe.
