= The Secret Lives of Baba Segi's Wives (novel) =

2010 novel by Lola Shoneyin

- Author: Lola Shoneyin
- Publisher: Serpent's Tail
- ISBN: 9781846687488

The Secret Lives of Baba Segi's Wives is the title of the 2010 debut novel by the Nigerian poet Lola Shoneyin. The novel was longlisted for the prestigious Women's Prize for Fiction in 2011. It won the PEN Oakland Josephine Miles Literary Award in 2011 and the ANA Ken Saro-Wiwa Prose Prize in the same year. It was short listed for the NLNG Nigeria prize for literature in 2012 and was listed in the top ten novels about Nigeria by The Observer newspaper in 2014. It has been translated into several languages including Arabic and has been adapted for the stage and screen.

The novel follows the Alao family of Baba Segi of Ibadan, his four wives and seven children, during the period that his fourth wife, a university graduate, is within the household. In Nigeria polygamy is a common practice and the novel, written by an author familiar with this system of multiple wives, deals with the cultural pressures on the infertile and impotent within a polygamous society, as well as with the universal themes of rape, domestic abuse, marital property rights, girls’ education, jealousy and power relations in a family.

Because of its themes, the novel has been the basis of academic papers on stress management among co-wives, polygamy and female agency, and has contributed to a feminist analysis of patriarchal structures.

== Plot summary ==
The life-changing events of rape and abortion, which she has largely kept secret, have led Bolanle to choose to become the fourth wife of Baba Segi, a man she sees as plump, prosperous, kindly and undemanding. Her mother, who has worked hard to give her daughter the benefit of a university education, is furious at her decision. On arriving at her new home, Bolanle meets the first wife Iya Segi and her children Segi and Akin, the second wife Iya Tope and her children Tope and Afolake, and the third wife Iya Femi who has borne Femi and Kole. Bolanle believes at first that she can educate the family to be more courteous and literate and that with loving kindness towards them she can become a valued member of the household. Two years of jealous attacks on her by the oldest and youngest wives make her realise however that this is unlikely. She has also still not become pregnant. Receiving advice from male acquaintances in a bar, Baba Segi takes Bolanle to a hospital for tests, believing that she must be the one who has a fertility problem.

The main characters, the four wives, the husband and his driver all have their own chapters during which the reader discovers their individual stories, their reasons for ending up in Baba Segi's household and the secrets that they are all keeping from Bolanle and from the husband.

When Baba Segi is called to the hospital for tests of his own, the first three wives know that the game will shortly be up. His infertility and the wives’ recourse to other men in order to become pregnant will be revealed, the household in disarray and their material comfort affected. A plot to poison Bolanle misfires and Segi, the first daughter, dies instead. Baba Segi, a loving father, has to deal with this trauma and the news that none of the children in the household were fathered by him. He decides to offer freedom to his wives. The first three opt to stay on under strict new regulations that keep them at home and thus their husband's infertility a secret. Bolanle is the only one who decides to walk free, vowing to overcome her resultant status as a 'damaged' woman with education, training and fortitude.

== Adaptations and translations ==
The book has been adapted for the stage and the play of the same name received a five star review from The Guardian.

In January 2026 it was announced that Mo Abudu's Ebony Life Films was adapting the novel to the big screen. The film is to be helmed by Daniel Oriahi from a script by Adze Ugah.

The book has been published in translation in several languages including:

- Arabic: al-Ḥayāt al-sarriyah li-zawjāt Bābā Sāghī (al-Ṭabʻah al-ūlá ed.). al-Shāriqah. 2022. ISBN 9789948468257.
- Dutch: De vrouwen van Baba Segi. Amsterdam: Sijthoff. 2012. ISBN 9789021806105.
- French: Baba Segi, ses épouses, leurs secrets : roman. Arles: Actes Sud. 2016. ISBN 9782330069131.
- German: Die geheimen Leben der Frauen des Baba Segi (Lizenzausg ed.). Frankfurt am Main: Edition Büchergilde. 2014. ISBN 9783864060410.
- Italian: Prudenti come serpenti (2. ed.). Roma: 66Thand2nd. 2021. ISBN 9788832971736.
- Turkish: Baba Segi ve dört eşin gizli yaşamları (Birinci basım ed.). Istanbul. 2013. ISBN 9786054726295.

== Analysis ==
Through the context and characters in her novel, Shoneyin deals with the many forces of oppression against women and girls that are present in a patriarchal society. These include child abuse, rape, forced marriage, lack of inheritance rights for women and girls, and conflict between co-wives. The wives in the novel have recourse to different strategies to cope with the stress of these oppressions. Their resources include co-wife rank, bonding with co-wives, experiencing joy in children, strength of ego, economic freedom and education.

The women in the novel's polygamous family affected by male infertility need to produce children either by sexual activity outside the marriage or by divorce, otherwise they risk being regarded as barren and useless and being returned in shame to their own families.

The novel's discourse, the utterances and thoughts of the first three wives, provide justification for their adultery and their hostility towards the fourth wife, given the post-modern, Yoruba society and androcentric moral code within which they live, where womanhood is viewed as equating to motherhood. Shoneyin thus balances their powerlessness to some extent although ultimately, after Baba Segi's decision, the first three wives are left in an even more circumscribed situation than before. Shoneyin also admits the stigma attached to public knowledge of a male's infertility indicating that polygamy is not without its problems for either women or men.
