= Remi Raji =

Nigerian poet, writing in English (born 1961)

- Born: Aderemi Raji-Oyelade; 1961 (age 64–65)
- Occupation: Poet

Aderemi Raji-Oyelade (born 1961) is a Nigerian poet, writing in English. He is popularly known by his pen name, Remi Raji.

== Career ==
A Salzburg Fellow and visiting professor and writer to a number of institutions, among them Southern Illinois University at Edwardsville, the Universities of California at Riverside and Irvine, University of Cape Town, South Africa, and the University of Cambridge, Raji has had scholarly essays published in journals including Research in African Literatures and African Literature Today. He has read his poems widely in Africa, Europe and America. In 2005, he served as the Guest Writer to the City of Stockholm, Sweden.

His volumes of poetry include Webs of Remembrance (2001), Shuttlesongs America: A poetic guided tour (2003), Lovesong for My Wasteland (2005), Gather My Blood Rivers of Song (2009) and Sea of My Mind (2013). Raji's works have been translated into French, German, Catalan, Swedish, Ukrainian, Latvian, Croatian and Hungarian. He has been an Alexander von Humboldt Scholar to Humboldt University, Berlin, Germany.

Remi Raji was elected as the Publicity Secretary of the Oyo State chapter of the Association of Nigerian Authors (ANA) in 1989. His second elective position was as Vice-Chair of the ANA in 1997. He became the substantive Chairman of the ANA from 1998 to 2000, at the election of Dr. Wale Okediran to the national executive committee of the ANA. Raji served as the Year 2000 Editor of the ANA Review, the official journal of the association. On 3 December 2011, during the 30th-anniversary celebration of the founding of the Association of Nigerian Authors, Remi Raji was elected as the ANA's 11th President.

Raji was the National Coordinator of the resuscitated Nigerian PEN Centre in 1999 before he was elected as the Secretary of the Centre, a position he held until February 2010. During this period, Raji facilitated international workshops and strategic meetings of African PEN Centres within Africa and in Europe. He was unanimously elected as the first Coordinating Secretary of PAN, the Congress of PEN African Centres, at a special meeting of the group on 22 November 2003 in Mexico City.

At his university, University of Ibadan, the Professor of English and African Literatures and Creative Writing has served in many administrative capacities, which culminated in his appointment as the Head of the Department of English in 2011. Over a year after that substantive position, he was elected as the Dean of the Faculty of Arts.

== Bibliography ==
- A Harvest of Laughters, 1997, joint winner of the Association of Nigerian Authors/Cadbury Poetry Prize and winner of the Association of West African Young Writers' VOCA Award for Best First Published Book
- Webs of Remembrance, 2001
- Shuttlesongs America: A Poetic Guided Tour, 2001–2003
- Lovesong for My Wasteland, 2005
- Gather My Blood Rivers of Song, 2009.
- Sea of My Mind, 2013.
- Wanderer Cantos, 2021.
