= LifeBank (Nigeria) =

Nigerian healthcare technology and logistics company

- Type: Private
- Industry: Healthcare technology, logistics
- Founded: 2016
- Founder: Temie Giwa-Tubosun
- Headquarters: Lagos, Nigeria
- Area served: Nigeria
- Key people: Temie Giwa-Tubosun (CEO)
- Products: Blood, oxygen, medical consumables, medical equipment
- Services: Medical supply chain logistics
- Website: lifebank.ng

LifeBank is a healthcare technology and logistics company based in Lagos, Nigeria. It is a health startup that facilitates the transmission of blood from labs across the country to patients and doctors in hospitals. It was founded in 2016 by Temie Giwa-Tubosun. As at January 2017, it had delivered over 2,000 imperial pints (1,100 L) of blood to patients in need across the country. Facebook founder Mark Zuckerberg stated in 2016 that “This is a thing that needs to exist.”

== Establishment and mission ==
In July 2012, Giwa-Tubosun founded a non-government organisation called the "One Percent Project" which was aimed at increasing voluntary blood donation across Nigeria. It collected over 3,100 imperial pints (1,800 L) of blood. In December 2015, it became LifeBank, which is a commercial endeavour. The company delivers "an average of 300 imperial pints (170 L) of blood a month to more than 170 hospitals across the state." It also regularly runs blood drives across the state, in collaboration with the state government blood transfusion services, in order to help increase the supply of blood across the state.

== See also ==
- International Red Cross and Red Crescent Movement
