= Yemi Adesanya =

Nigerian author, accountant and inventor

- Jọ́láóyẹmí Doyinsọ́lá Ọlátúbọ̀sún
- Born: Ibadan, Oyo State, Nigeria
- Education: Ondo State University, University of Leicester
- Occupations: Banker, writer, accountant

Yemi Adesanya is a Nigerian author, accountant and inventor. She is the co-founder of The Arts & Civics Table (TACT). Her first collection of poetry is titled Musings of a Tangled Tongue.

== Early life and education ==
Born Jolaoyemi Doyinsola Olatubosun to a family of eight, Adesanya attended schools in Ibadan, Oyo State, and Akungba, Ondo State of Nigeria.

== Poetry collection ==
Adesanya's debut poetry collection titled Musings of a Tangled Tongue was published in 2016 by Kiibaati Resources Limited to rave reviews. It contains 54 poems over sixty pages.

The collection has been described as "a debut publication that invites readers on a poetic journey paved with goofiness, love dealings and dilemma, child-rearing and childhood, supplication, existential musings, corporate chaos, mischiefs and misadventures, and outright naughtiness." According to one reviewer, it is "witty, it's irreverent, it's relatable, and most importantly, it is refreshing."

== Card game invention ==
In 2014, Yemi invented two card games. One was called The Game of Giants, designed "to teach history in a fun and interactive way"

. She has also suggested new informal holidays in Nigeria.
