= Wendy Call =

American writer and translator

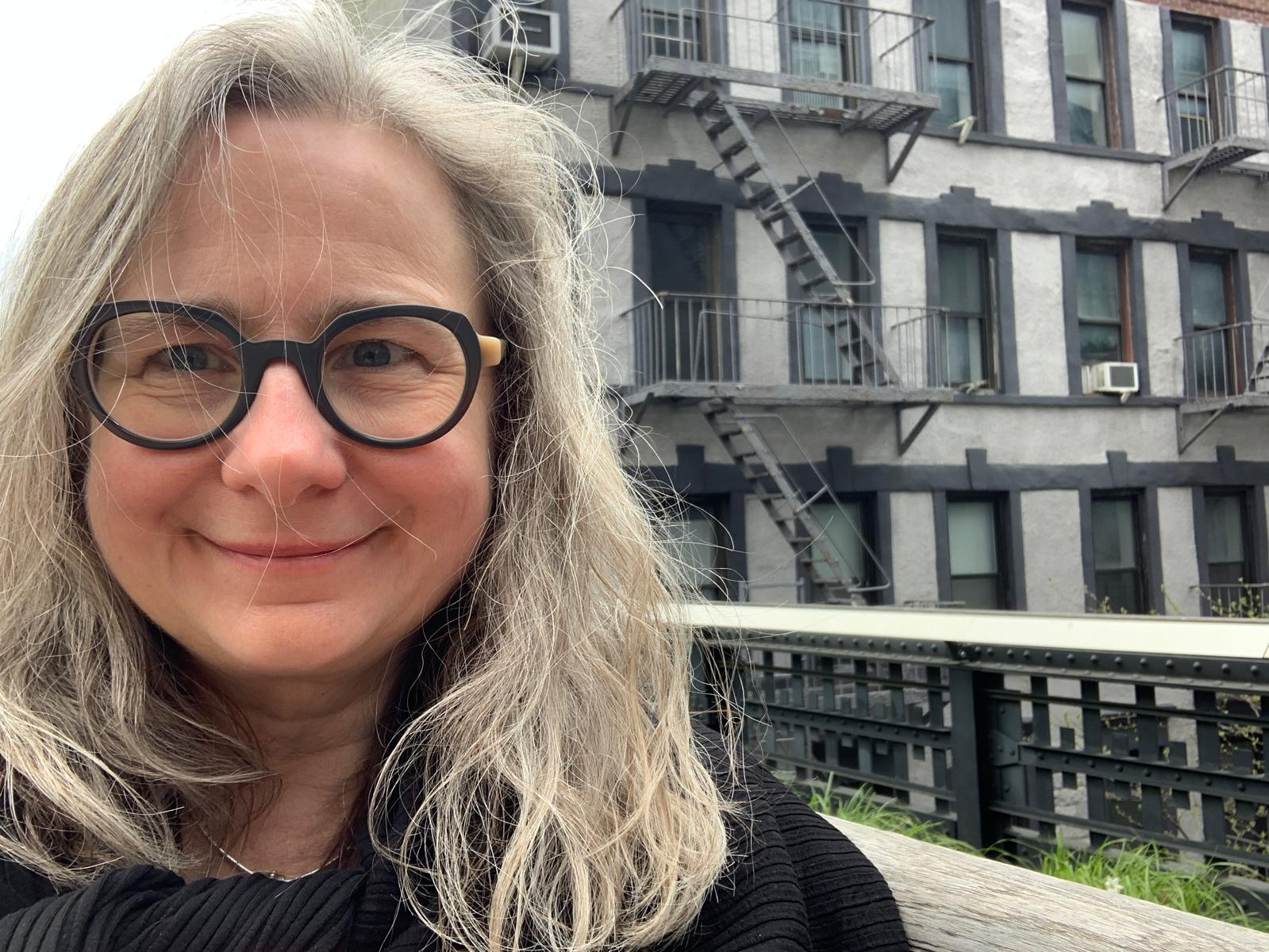
- Born: Florida, United States
- Education: Oberlin College, Bennington College
- Occupations: Writer, translator, editor
- Website: www.wendycall.com

Wendy Call is an American writer, editor, translator, and educator. She is the founding co-editor of Best Literary Translations anthology and the author of many books in translation. She lives in Seattle.

== Biography ==
Call has served as Writer in Residence at a number of institutions, universities, national parks, high schools, visual art centers, a historical archive and a public hospital. She co-edited Telling True Stories: A Nonfiction Writers’ Guide (Penguin, 2007). It was listed as one of the Buzzfeed's "40 Books That Might Help You Write Your Novel" in 2022

Her book No Word for Welcome: The Mexican Village Faces the Global Economy (Nebraska, 2011) won Grub Street's National Book Prize for Nonfiction.

She has also translated work by Irma Pineda. A book of her poems titled Nostalgia Doesn't Flow Away Like Riverwater was published in 2024.

Her essays about indigenous Mexican literature and her translations have appeared recently in Diálogo, Kenyon Review online, Michigan Quarterly Review, Orion, and World Literature Today online. Her current writing projects have been supported by 4Culture, Artist Trust, Jack Straw Cultural Center, K2 Foundation, and Seattle's CityArtist Program. She teaches creative nonfiction in the Rainier Writing Workshop, the MFA in creative writing program of Pacific Lutheran University.

In 2022, Call founded Best Literary Translations anthology. Working with three series co-editors, the work aims to showcase the best literary translations into English from around the world, published in US journals.

== Notable links/interviews ==
- Wendy Call and Shook on the Power of Titles, Decolonization, and Translating Poems in Iterations (2024)
