= The Secret Lives of Baba Segi's Wives (play) =

Stage play by Rotimi Babatunde

- Company: Bombay Republic
- Date of premiere: June 7, 2018
- Final show: July 21, 2018
- Location: Arcola Theatre

The Secret Lives of Baba Segi's Wives is a stage play by Rotimi Babatunde based on a 2010 novel of the same name by Nigerian poet, Lola Shoneyin. It was directed by Femi Elufowoju Jr and showed at the Arcola Theatre in London.

== Synopsis ==
The Secret Lives of Baba Segi's Wives explores the themes of polygamy, rivalry, sexuality, mental health and the struggles of African women as laid out in the novel The Secret Lives of Baba Segi's Wives. The story follows the titular Baba Segi, his four wives, seven children and a secret as it unravels. Baba Segi is an unlettered but rich patriarch of a large household. There is an ongoing supremacy battle amongst the wives which Baba Segi is not aware of. He leaves his wives to their devices and marries Bolanle, a young university graduate whose naïveté leads to her struggles in Baba Segi's household. Bolanle's naïveté also leads to her unwitting unraveling of the untold secrets of Baba Segi's wives.

== Cast ==
- Patrice Naiambana as Baba Segi
- Marcy Dolapo Oni as Bolanle
- Jumoké Fashola as Iya Segi (Baba Segi's first wife)
- Christina Oshunniyi as Iya Tope (Baba Segi's second wife)
- Layo-Christina Akinlude as Iya Femi (Baba Segi's third wife)
- Ayo-Dele Edwards
- Tania Nwachukwu
- Diana Yekinni
- Ayan De First
- Usifu Jalloh

== Personnel ==
Choreography - Kemi Durosinmi and Uche Onah

Costume - Shola Ajayi

== Reception ==
Henry Hitchings of the Evening Standard rated the show 4/5. In his review, he said, "This is an exuberantly entertaining show. Although the humour is often broad, there’s an unflinching seriousness in its depiction of violent abuse (and worse). Tellingly, too, it portrays a society that may notionally be overseen by men yet is actually run by women, and the line that lives in the memory is Iya Segi’s withering observation that “men are like yam — you cut them how you like”." It was also rated 4/5 by Whats On Stage and Londonist.

Femi Elufowoju Jr received the Offie for Best Director for the play.

== Other shows ==
Prior to the London production, The Secret Lives of Baba Segi's Wives also showed in Abekouta featuring Adesua Etomi and Joke Silva.

Netflix is set to release a series of the same name produced by Mo Abudu. Lola Shoneyin disclosed that she would like the movie to be shot in Ibadan.
