= Lola Shoneyin =

Nigerian poet and author (born 1974)

Lola Shoneyin FRSL
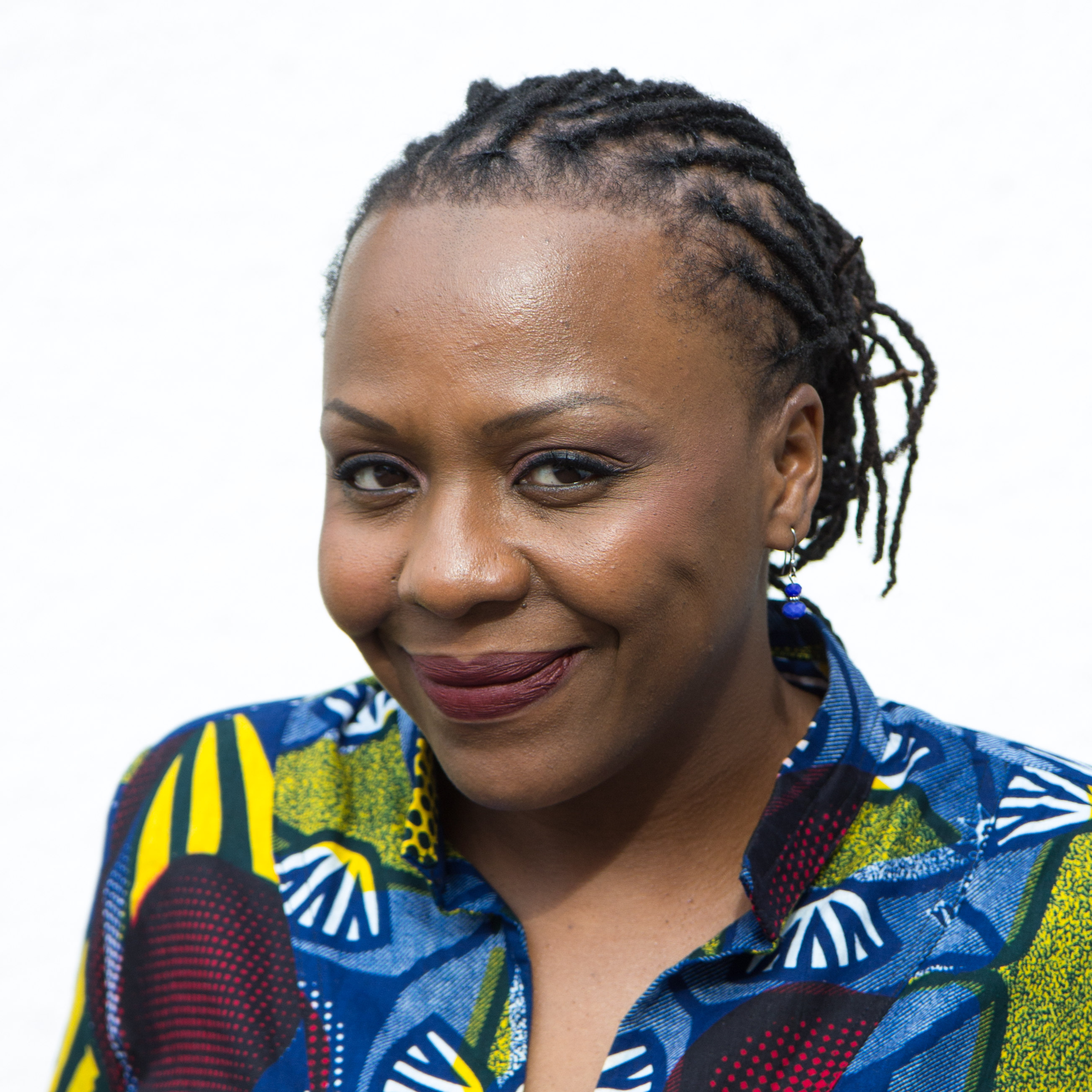
- Lola Shoneyin 2015
- Born: Titilola Atinuke Alexandrah Shoneyin; 26 February 1974; Ibadan, Oyo State, Nigeria
- Education: Ogun State University, BA (Hons)
- Occupation: Author
- Spouse: Olaokun Soyinka
- Parents: Chief Tinuoye (father); Yetunde Shoneyin (mother)
- Relatives: Abraham Olayinka Okupe (Grandfather)
- Family: 4 Children
- Awards: Literary Person Of The Year - 2018
- Website: www.lolashoneyin.com

Lola Shoneyin (born Titilola Atinuke Alexandrah Shoneyin; 26 February 1974 in Ibadan, Nigeria) is a Nigerian poet and author who launched her debut novel, The Secret Lives of Baba Segi's Wives, in the UK in May 2010. Shoneyin has forged a reputation as an adventurous, humorous and outspoken poet (often classed in the feminist mould), having published three volumes of poetry. Her writing delves into themes related to female sexuality and the difficulties of domestic life in Africa.

In April 2014, she was named on the Hay Festival's Africa39 list of 39 Sub-Saharan African writers aged under 40 with potential and talent to define trends in African literature. Shoneyin won the PEN Literary Award in America as well as the Ken Saro-Wiwa Award for prose in Nigeria. She was also on the list for the Orange Prize in the UK for her debut novel, The Secret of Baba Segi's Wives, in 2010. She lives in Lagos, Nigeria, where she curates and runs the annual Aké Arts and Book Festival. In 2017, she was named African Literary Person of the Year by Brittle Paper.

Shoneyin was elected a Fellow of the Royal Society of Literature (FRSL) in 2026.

== Biography ==
=== Early life ===
Titilola Atinuke Alexandrah Shoneyin was born in Ibadan, the capital of Oyo State, south-western Nigeria, in 1974. She is the youngest of six children and the only girl. Her parents, Chief Tinuoye Shoneyin and Mrs. Yetunde Shoneyin (née Okupe), are Remo indigenes from Ogun State.

Shoneyin’s work is significantly influenced by her life, notably providing material on polygamy for her debut novel; her maternal grandfather, Abraham Olayinka Okupe (1896-1976) was the traditional ruler of Iperu Remo and had five wives. He ascended the throne in 1938 and died in 1976.

=== Education and career ===
At the age of six, she went to boarding school in the UK, attending Cargilfield School, Edinburgh; The Collegiate School, Winterbourne, Bristol, and Fettes Junior School in Edinburgh. Returning to Nigeria after her father was imprisoned by the then military government, she completed her secondary education at Abadina College. She later earned her BA (Hons) degree from Ogun State University in 1994/95.

Shoneyin's early writing consists mainly of poetry and short stories. Early examples of her work appeared in the Post Express in 1995, which features a short story about a Nigerian woman who leaves her husband for an Austrian woman. This story initiated dialogue about homosexuality within a Nigerian context.

Her first volume of poetry, So All the Time I was Sitting on an Egg, was published by Ovalonion House, Nigeria, in 1998. Shoneyin attended the renowned International Writing Program in Iowa, USA, in August 1999 and was also in that year a Distinguished Scholar at the University of St. Thomas (Minnesota).

Her second volume of poetry, Song of a Riverbird, was published in Nigeria (Ovalonion House) in 2002. While living in England, she obtained a teaching degree from London Metropolitan University in 2005.

Shoneyin completed her first novel in 2000. Her second novel, Harlot, received some interest, but the story of a young girl growing up in colonial Nigeria to make a fortune as a "Madame" remains unpublished. Shoneyin moved on to her third novel, The Secret Lives of Baba Segi's Wives, which was published in 2010. It was adapted as a stage play by Rotimi Babatunde and it showed in the Arcola Theatre in London.

Cassava Republic Press, Nigeria, published Shoneyin's third poetry collection, For the Love of Flight, in February 2010. Mayowa and the Masquerades, a children’s book, was also published by Cassava Republic, in July 2010.

Shoneyin has also written for newspapers, including The Scotsman, The Guardian, and The Times on issues such as racism, Nigeria's tradition of polygamous marriage, the Nigerian terrorist group Boko Haram and the elections of now former President Muhammadu Buhari.

She is the founder and Director of Book Buzz Foundation, a non-governmental organization established in 2012 for the promotion of arts and culture within local and global spaces. She co-founded Infusion, a popular monthly gathering for music, art and culture in Abuja, Nigeria. Shoneyin served as a judge of the 2018 Caine Prize for African Writing. She also runs the publishing imprint and bookshop Ouida Books in Nigeria.

Shoneyin was elected a Fellow of the Royal Society of Literature (FRSL) in 2026.

=== Private life ===
Her first marriage lasted a short 40 days. She is now married to medical doctor Olaokun Soyinka, son of Nobel laureate Wole Soyinka and has been with him for 22 years. She currently lives in Lagos with her husband and four children (two boys and two girls).

== Works ==
=== Novels ===
- Mayowa and the Masquerades - January 2021
- Nostalgia is an Extreme Sport: An essay from the collection, Of This Our Country - September 2010
- Baba Segi, Ses Épouses, Leurs Secrets October 2016
- The Secret Lives of Baba Segi's Wives, London: Serpent's Tail, May 2010.
  - Longlisted for the 2011 Orange Prize, won the 2011 PEN Oakland/Josephine Miles Literary Award and won two Association of Nigerian Authors Awards.
  - Translated into seven languages, published in Italian as Prudenti Come Serpenti.

=== Short stories ===
- "Woman in Her Season", Post Express Newspapers, 1996

=== Poetry ===
- So All the Time I was Sitting on an Egg (1998)
- Song of a River Bird, Ovalonion House (Nigeria, 2002)
- For the Love of Flight (2010)

=== Children’s books ===
- Mayowa and the Masquerade, July 2010, published in the US in 2020
- Iyaji, the Housegirl (2014).

== Scholarly study of Shoneyin's work ==
- Abiola, Emmanuel. Negotiating Patriarchal Structures: Polygamy and Female Agency in Lola Shoneyin’s The Secret Lives of Baba Segi’s Wives. Ibadan Journal of English Studies 7 (2018): 497–504.
- Bámgbózé, Gabriel. "Beyond Gender Allegory: A Postcolonial Reading of Lola Shoneyin’s Poetry. Ibadan Journal of English Studies 7 (2018): 155-170.
- Jegede, O. B. Subversive (re) writing and body poetics in Lola Shoneyin’s "So all the time I was sitting on an egg". Ibadan Journal of English Studies 7 (2018): 207–224.
