= The Warmth of Other Suns =

2010 book by Isabel Wilkerson

- Hardcover edition
- Author: Isabel Wilkerson
- Language: English
- Subject: The Great Migration, Second Great Migration
- Genre: Non-fiction
- Publisher: Random House
- Publication date: 2010
- Publication place: United States
- Media type: Print, e-book, audiobook
- Pages: 622
- ISBN: 978-0-679-44432-9
- OCLC: 741763572

The Warmth of Other Suns: The Epic Story of America's Great Migration (2010) is a historical study of the Great Migration by Isabel Wilkerson and winner of the National Book Critics Circle Award.

== Synopsis ==
The Warmth of Other Suns tells the story of the Great Migration, the movement of Black Americans out of the Southern United States to the Midwest, Northeast, and West from approximately 1915 to 1970. Throughout the twentieth century, this exodus of almost six million people changed the face of America. Wilkerson interviewed more than a thousand people, and gained access to new data and official records, to write this account of how these American journeys unfolded, altering cities, America and the American people.

Wilkerson tells this story through the lives of three unique individuals--Ida Mae Gladney, George Starling, and Robert Foster--who fled the South eight years apart from each other. In 1937, Ida Mae Gladney left sharecropping and prejudice in Mississippi behind for Chicago, where she achieved quiet blue-collar success and, in old age, voted for Barack Obama when he ran for an Illinois Senate seat. In 1945, George Starling fled Florida for Harlem, where he endangered his job fighting for civil rights, saw his family fall, and finally found peace in God. And in 1953, Robert Foster left Louisiana to pursue a successful medical career. He eventually became the personal physician to Ray Charles, which allowed him to purchase a grand home where he often threw exuberant parties.

== Title ==
The title of the book derives from a poem by author Richard Wright, who moved from the South to Chicago in the 1920s. The poem is excerpted here:

I was leaving the South
to fling myself into the unknown...
I was taking a part of the South
to transplant in alien soil,
to see if it could grow differently,
if it could drink of new and cool rains,
bend in strange winds,
respond to the warmth of other suns
and, perhaps, to bloom.

— Richard Wright, Black Boy, 1945

== Awards and honors ==
- TIME 10 Best Nonfiction Books of the Decade
- New York Times bestseller (Nonfiction, 2010)
- New York Times Best Books of the Year (2010)
- New York Times Notable Book of the Year (Nonfiction, 2010)
- Salon Book Award (Nonfiction, 2010)
- Publishers Weekly’s Top 10 Best Books (2010)
- National Book Critics Circle Award (Nonfiction, 2011)
- ALA Notable Book (2011)
- Dayton Literary Peace Prize (Non-Fiction runner-up, 2011)
- Pen-Galbraith Literary Award (Shortlist, 2011)
- Anisfield-Wolf Book Award (2011)
- Heartland Prize (Nonfiction, 2011)
- Mark Lynton History Prize (2011)
- The Hillman Prize (2011)
- Hurston/Wright Legacy Award (2011)
- The New York Times Book Review "100 Best Books of the 21st Century", ranked #2 (2024)

The Warmth of Other Suns was a New York Times and national best seller, garnering half a dozen juried prizes. The book was named to more than 30 Best of the Year lists, including The New York Times’ 10 Best Books of the Year, Amazon’s 5 Best Books of 2010 and Best of the Year lists in The New Yorker, The Los Angeles Times, The Washington Post, and The Boston Globe, among others. In 2024, the New York Times ranked it as the second best book of the 21st century thus far, and the best non-fiction book, in a list of 100 fiction and nonfiction titles.

Toni Morrison described the book as "profound, necessary, and a delight to read". Tom Brokaw praised it as "an epic for all Americans who want to understand the making of our modern nation". Critics acclaimed it as "a massive and masterly account"; "a deeply affecting, finely crafted and heroic book"; "a brilliant and stirring epic".

== Editions ==
- The Warmth of Other Suns: The Epic Story of America's Great Migration, Random House (hardcover, first), ISBN 978-0-679-44432-9
- Paperback, electronic book, and audiobook editions

== Adaptations ==
In 2012, Ballet Memphis commissioned a production inspired by The Warmth of Other Suns entitled "Party of the Year." The ballet, choreographed by Matthew Neenan, is about a birthday bash on Christmas 1970 and is based on characters in the book.

In 2015, a television adaptation of The Warmth of Other Suns was announced. Executive produced by Shonda Rhimes, the book was slated for a limited historical drama series. The project was reported to be in development with Shondaland, Rhimes' production company. As of 2026, there have been no additional updates.
