= Olaokun Soyinka =

Nigerian physician (born 1958)

- Born: 11 November 1958 (age 67)
- Education: Government College, Ibadan; University of London; St Thomas's Hospital Medical School; Cranfield School of Management
- Occupation: Medical doctor
- Spouse: Lola Shoneyin
- Children: 7
- Parents: Wole Soyinka; Barbara Dixon
- Relatives: Ransome-Kuti family

Olaokun Soyinka (born 11 November 1958) is a Nigerian medical doctor and a former Ogun State commissioner for Health.

His father, Wole Soyinka, is the 2nd Nobel laureate in Africa.

== Early life and career ==
Olaokun is the first child of Nigerian Nobel Laureate Wole Soyinka and his first wife, British multicultural educationist, Barbara Dixon. He has nine siblings. He attended Government College, Ibadan, before pursuing a career in Medicine. He attended University of London (St Thomas's Hospital Medical School) and qualified as a doctor in 1982 and also got an MBA from Cranfield School of Management in 1986. He practised as a physician in the UK before founding and publishing the British Journal of Cardiology. He was an active member of the Nigerian prodemocracy movement and General Secretary of NALICON (National Liberation Council of Nigeria). He was also a member of New Nigeria Forum where he collaborated with Dr Kayode Fayemi to publish NigeriaNow, the prodemocracy newsletter. He, along with a small team of activists (Bola Ahmed Tinubu, Kayode Fayemi and Wole Soyinka) worked together to establish Radio Free Nigeria which was later renamed Radio Kudirat, a shortwave station, which broadcast daily to Nigeria. He returned to Nigeria in 1998, following the death of military dictator, Sani Abacha.

Since his return to Nigeria, he has pursued a career in Public Health. After a period of consultancy for the UN and CIDA, he spent three years at the WHO country office as the Health Promotion Officer. He was subsequently appointed as Commissioner for Health, Ogun State. While serving as Commissioner, he spearheaded the implementation of the Ogun State Community-based Health Insurance Scheme called Araya.
