= Chimurenga (magazine) =

South African arts, culture and politics magazine

- Editor: Ntone Edjabe
- Categories: Literary magazine
- First issue: April 2002
- Country: South Africa
- Based in: Cape Town
- Language: English
- Website: Chimurengachronic.co.za
- ISSN: 1817-0919

Chimurenga is a publication of arts, culture and politics from and about Africa and its diasporas, founded and edited by Ntone Edjabe. Both the magazine's name (Chimurenga is a Shona word that loosely translates as "liberation struggle") and the content capture the connection between African cultures and politics on the continent and beyond.

== History ==
Chimurenga was launched in 2002 as a magazine promoted by Kalakuta Trust and founded by Ntone Edjabe. It is based in Cape Town, South Africa, but its network is international. Chimurenga focuses on Africa and its diaspora, aiming at capturing the connection between African cultures and politics on the continent and beyond. Chimurenga gradually began developing a series of publications, events (called Chimurenga Sessions) and specific projects.

=== Notability ===
Chimurenga is reviewed by newspapers and magazines and it is presented inside conferences, events and exhibitions. In 2007, it was part of the Documenta magazine project within Documenta exhibition in Kassel; in 2008 it was reviewed by an article of The New York Times. Its director Ntone Edjabe talks about the magazine and its approach during numerous interviews and conferences also at the Centre Pompidou in Paris and the Art Academy in Berlin in 2005, at the Dakar Biennale in 2006 and at the Massachusetts Institute of Technology in 2009. In particular the capacity of Chimurenga to influence ideas and writing and its role as an innovative educational model is recognised by initiatives such as Meanwhile in Africa... in 2005, and Learning Machines: Art Education and Alternative Production of Knowledge in 2010. In 2010 Chimurenga began a collaboration with the magazine Glänta to translate Chimurenga into Swedish.

== Activities ==
In addition to its magazine, Chimurenga produces other publications, events and specific projects.

=== Magazine ===
The first issue of Chimurenga magazine was published in April 2002. Each issue has a specific theme. Initially a quarterly, Chimurenga now appears approximately three times a year. Interrogating the superficial has always been the core agenda of the publication. The various renegades are captured in a series of profiles "thinking out loud". Chimurenga shies away from the Q&A format and includes deconstructed and imagined interviews, surreal short stories and poetry and other devices that challenge strict notions of fact and fiction. Covers are equally indicative of the orientation of a journal which is at once theoretical, erotic, and provocative. One cover featured the words of "Strange Fruit", the song about Southern lynchings that Billie Holiday immortalised. Another featured Neo Muyanga's portrait of Steve Biko's bruised face. The first edition showed Peter Tosh at a gig in Eswatini in the early 1980s, pointing an AK-47-shaped guitar in the direction of South Africa and chanting down Babylon.

Chimurenga orients itself not only to radical people that form its immediate target group, but also to the lay reader. It is distributed in South Africa, Zimbabwe, Mozambique, Kenya, Eswatini, Botswana and Ghana. Its distribution has seen it read on campuses in Germany, the United States, Great Britain and France.

The magazine has featured work by emerging as well as established voices including Njabulo Ndebele, Lesego Rampolokeng, Santu Mofokeng, Keorapetse Kgositsile, Gael Reagon, Binyavanga Wainaina, Yvonne Adhiambo Owuor, Boubacar Boris Diop, Tanure Ojaide, Dominique Malaquais, Stacy Hardy, Goddy Leye, Zwelethu Mthethwa, Mahmood Mamdani, Jorge Matine, and Greg Tate, among others.

- Chimurenga Vol. 1, Music Is The Weapon, April 2002
- Chimurenga Vol. 2, Dis-Covering Home, July 2002
- Chimurenga Vol. 3, Biko in Parliament, November 2002
- Chimurenga Vol. 4, Black Gays & Mugabes, May 2003
- Chimurenga Vol. 5, Head/Body(&Tools)/Corpses, April 2004
- Chimurenga Vol. 6, The Orphans Of Fanon, October 2004
- Chimurenga Vol. 7, Kaapstad! (and Jozi, the night Moses died), July 2005
- Chimurenga Vol. 8, We're all Nigerian!, December 2005
- Chimurenga Vol. 9, Conversations in Luanda and Other Graphic Stories, June 2006
- Chimurenga Vol. 10, Futbol, Politricks & Ostentatious Cripples, December 2006
- Chimurenga Vol. 11, Conversations With Poets Who Refuse To Speak, July 2007. The magazine produces a presentation video of the issue. The issue is translated into Swedish and published by the magazine Glänta 2/2010.
- Chimurenga Vol. 12/13, Dr. Satan's Echo Chamber, March 2008. The magazine produces a presentation video of the issue.
- Chimurenga Vol. 14, Everyone Has Their Indian, April 2009. Dedicated to Third World projects and links, real and imaginary, between Africa and South Asia. The magazine produces two presentation videos of the issue.
- Chimurenga Vol. 15, The Curriculum is Everything, May 2010. The issue is conceived as a second chance to write history: a low-tech time-machine that allows produce a back-issue of a newspaper and to analyse xenophobic events that took place in South Africa, Nigeria and Kenya in the week 11–18 May 2008. The issue is produced by an online editorial board that involves writers, artists and journalists in collaboration with the magazines Chimurenga and Kwani? and the publishers Cassava Republic Press.
- Chimurenga Vol. 16: The Chimurenga Chronicle, October 2011 — described as "the once-off edition of an imaginary newspaper.... Set in the week 18–24 May 2008, the Chronic imagines the newspaper as producer of time – a time-machine.... An intervention into the newspaper as a vehicle of knowledge production and dissemination, it seeks to provide an alternative to mainstream representations of history, on the one hand filling the gap in the historical coverage of this event, whilst at the same time reopening it. The objective is not to revisit the past to bring about closure, but rather to provoke and challenge our perceptions."

Chimurenga also has a monthly online edition that presents other short contributions not directly connected to the themes of the paper publication.

=== Chimurenganyana ===
Chimurenganyana is a series of low-cost publications and a distribution system. A selection of articles from Chimurenga are printed on small sizes and are sold by street vendors who normally sell cigarettes. Each edition is focused on a specific theme.

- Julian Jonker, A Silent Way: Routes of South African Jazz, 1946-1978
- Keziah Jones, When You Kill Us, We Rule!: Fela Anikulapo Kuti's Last Interview
- Dominique Malaquais, Blood Money: A Douala Chronicle
- Njabulo Ndebele, Thinking of Brenda
- Achille Mbembe, Variations on the Beautiful in the Congolese World of Sounds
- Odia Ofeimun, In Defence of the Films We've Made

=== Chimurenga Library ===
The Chimurenga Library is a selection of magazines and publications that - according to Chimurenga - influence thinking and writing in Africa. The selection is presented on an online database under CC-BY-SA compatible with Wikipedia; it presents general information on the magazines and a sort of genealogy that links publications to one another.

Magazines and publications presented on the Chimurenga Library are: African Film, Amkenah, Black Images, Chief Priest Say, Civil Lines, Ecrans d'Afrique, Frank Talk, Glendora Review, Hambone, Hei Voetsek!, Joe, Autre Afrique, Lamalif, Mfumu'eto, Molotov Cocktail, Moto, Okyeame, Revue Noire, Savacou, Souffles, Spear, Staffrider, Straight No Chaser, The Book of Tongues, The Cricket: Black Music in Evolution, The Liberator Magazine, The Uncollected Writings of Greg Tate, Third Text, Tsotso, Two Tone, Unir Cinéma, Wietie, Y Magazine (first five issues).

Artists, writers and intellectuals who have contributed texts and videos to the Chimurenga Library include: Rustum Kozain, Vivek Narayanan, Patrice Nganang, Khulile Nxumalo, Sean O'Toole, Achal Prabhala, Suren Pillay, Lesego Rampolokeng, Tracey Rose, Ivan Vladislavic, Barbara Murray, Akin Adesokan, Nicole Turner, Tunde Giwa, Brian Chikwava, Judy Kibinge, Olu Oguibe, Sam Kahiga, Mike Abrahams, Sola Olorunyomi, Marie-Louise Bibish Mumbu, Nadi Edwards, Brent Hayes Edwards, Sharifa Rhodes Pitts, Jean-Pierre Bekolo and Aryan Kaganof.

In 2009 Chimurenga Library is shown with the title "Chimurenga Library: An introspective of Chimurenga" at Cape Town Central Library with a series of multimedia itineraries (reading routes and sound posts) and live events (music, readings, meetings with authors, projections and wiki workshop during which students are involved in producing Wikipedia articles). The idea of the presentation is to rethink a library as a laboratory which can trigger curiosity, adventures, critical thinking, activism, entertainment and random reading. The show presents panafrican independent periodicals, and the exhibition Why Must A Black Writer Write About Sex, a selection of texts on sex from African literature which confront stereotypes on sexuality and literature genres.

=== PASS Pan African Space Station ===
The PASS Pan African Space Station is an annual 30-day musical intervention, that takes place through a freeform radio station and in unexpected venues across greater Cape Town. The initiative is promoted by Ntone Edjabe and Neo Muyanga (The Heliocentrics) in collaboration with Africa Centre and it is organised in 2008, 2009 and 2010.

=== Pilgrimages ===
Pilgrimages is a project that sent 14 African writers to 13 African cities and one city of Brazil for two weeks to explore the complexity of urban landscapes. Pilgrimages commissioned travel books which narrate the experiences and the first African World Cup. The writers selected and their cities are Akenji Ndumu in Abidjan, Kojo Laing in Cape Town, Funmi Iyanda in Durban, Doreen Baingana in Hargeisa, Chris Abani in Johannesburg, Victor LaValle in Kampala, Nimco Mahamud Hassan in Khartoum, Alain Mabanckou in Lagos, Billy Kahora in Luanda, Nicole Turner in Nairobi, Abdourahman A. Waberi in Salvador, Uzodinma Iweala in Tombouctou and Binyavanga Wainaina in Touba. Pilgrimages is promoted by the Chinua Achebe Center for African Writers and Artists of Bard College in collaboration with Chimurenga, Kwani Trust and Kachifo Limited and with the support among others of Open Society Foundations South Africa, Karibu Foundation, Doen Foundation, Heinrich Böll Foundation and Hivos.

=== African Cities Reader ===
The African Cities Reader is a publication dedicated to African urban transformations and produced in collaboration with the African Centre for Cities of the Cape Town University and with the support of Rockefeller Foundation. Each issue is focussed on a specific theme and it is edited by Ntone Edjabe and Edgar Pieterse.

- African Cities Reader I: Pan-African Practices. Contributors to the publication: Chris Abani, Nuruddin Farah, Akin Adesokan, Gabeba Baderoon, Karen Press, José Eduardo Agualusa, Ashraf Jamal, Dominique Malaquais, Annie Paul, Teju Cole and Achal Prabhala.
- African Cities Reader II: Mobilities & Fixtures.
