= Yemisi Aribisala =

Nigerian writer (born 1973)

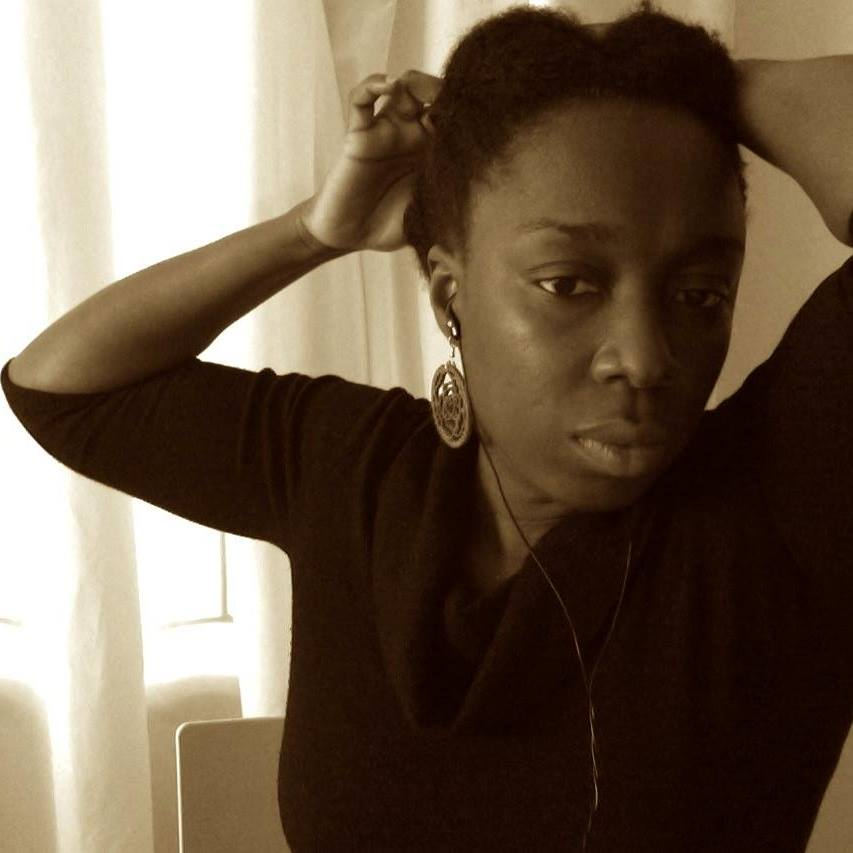
- Aribisala in 2015
- Born: Yẹ́misí Aríbisálà
- Other name: Yẹ́misí Ogbe
- Education: University of Wolverhampton, University of Wales
- Occupation: Writer

Yemisi Aribisala is a Nigerian essayist, writer, painter, and food memoirist. She has been described as having a "fearless, witty, and unapologetic voice" Her work has been featured in Vittles Magazine,The New Yorker, Vogue magazine, Chimurenga, Popula, The Johannesburg Review of Books, Critical Muslim 26: Gastronomy,CNN Travel Sandwich Magazine (The African Scramble), The Guardian (UK), Aké Review, Guernica Magazine London Feeds Itself, edited by Jonathan Nunn Olongo Africa., We Present, Scribehound Food and Flaming Hydra Magazine

Aribisala is renowned for her work in documenting Nigerian food as an entry point to thinking and understanding the culture and society. Her first book, Longthroat Memoirs: Soups, Sex, and the Nigerian Taste Buds, won the John Avery Prize at the André Simon Book Awards 2016. Her work has also appeared in New Daughters of Africa: An International Anthology of Writing by Women of African Descent (edited by Margaret Busby, 2019), The Dinner Table, Over 100 Writers of Food edited by Kate Young and Ella Risbridger,In the Kitchen: Essays on Food and Life, and The Best American Food Writing 2019 (edited by Samin Nosrat).

Aribisala currently lives in London, United Kingdom.

== Life and career ==
Aribisala attended the University of Wolverhampton, England, where she obtained a law degree in 1995. She subsequently earned a master's degree in Legal Aspects of Maritime Affairs and International Transport from the University of Wales, Cardiff, in 1997.

== Writing ==
She was the founding editor of the trailblazing Nigerian literary and culture publication Farafina Magazine.

From 2009 to 2011, she was the food columnist at the now-defunct, groundbreaking 234Next newspaper, where she first gained public attention, writing under the name Yẹ́misí Ogbe. She regularly contributes to literary publications, including the Chimurenga Chronicle, the avant-garde culture newspaper.

== Works ==
=== Longthroat Memoirs ===
On 31 October 2016, Aribisala's debut book of essays was published in Nigeria by Cassava Republic Press. It was titled Longthroat Memoirs: Soups, Sex, and the Nigerian Taste Buds, a collection of essays exploring "the cultural politics and erotics of Nigerian cuisine". It has been well received, being shortlisted for an André Simon Food and Drink Book Award and winning the John Avery Award.

Of her work the following has been said: "It is difficult to translate senses through words, but Aribisala manages to communicate the tastes, tickles and aromas of various African spices and ingredients wonderfully." The book has been described as "part straight cookbook, part cultural history, part travelogue, part intimate confessional, it's as complex and mysterious as one of the Nigerian soups Aribisala describes so evocatively in its pages" and a work "that carries the weight of so much cultural and literary burden, and manages to discharge it with grace and style." "[S]he joins thinkers like Chinua Achebe in rejecting the stereotype of the African writer as a mere storyteller, not a thinker."

She has been compared to writers such as Aminatta Forna and Binyavanga Wainaina who "play with the ontology of the 21st century African memoir, and oscillate between the deeply personal and the distinctly political"; a book that is a "mouth-watering appraisal of the cultural politics and erotics of Nigerian cuisine". The pages [of her book] sing with her clever, beautiful prose and sharp eye. It is a work "redolent with spice, rippling with humour and sexual innuendo, her memoirs conjure up fantasies that can only be satisfied by reading another chapter."

The cover image was designed by UK-based artist Lynn Hatzius, who said that her intention with the artwork was "to show how food culture is an ingrained part of us... I wanted the cover image to convey the joy of this and to invite the reader into Yemisi Aribisala's own celebration of food."

== Prizes and honours ==
In January 2017, Aribisala's debut book Longthroat Memoirs won the John Avery Prize at the André Simon Book Awards 2016.

In March 2017, Aribisala was listed as one of the 100 inspiring women in Nigeria in 2017.

On 13 February 2018, Longthroat Memoirs: Soups Sex & Nigerian Taste Buds was shortlisted for the 2018 Art of Eating Prize. https://artofeating.com/prize/short-list/

In May 2018 Longthroat Memoirs: Soups Sex & Nigerian Taste Buds won a Gourmand World Cookbook Award in C13 African-Published in Africa category.

In April 2026, Aribisala was shortlisted in the Food Writer Category of the 14th Fortnum & Mason Food and Drink Awards, alongside Chef and culinary artist, Safiya Robinson and Scottish Doctor, Baker and Runner up of Great British Bake Off, James Morton. Aribisala was awarded the trophy for Food Writer of the Year 2026, at the awards ceremony held at the Royal Exchange Bank, on the 30th of April 2026.

== Selected writings ==
- "The Importance of Mrs Kuti’s Memoir"
- "‘Black is beautiful’: Why Nigerians think their Guinness is better than Ireland’s"
- "The Naira Redrawn"
- "Not too sweet to be Nigerian"
- "Coin in the Mortar's Mouth"
- "Up the mountain called Okele"
- "Boy in a Gèlè" (February 2021), in OlongoAfrica
- The Beauty and Burden of Being a Nigerian Bride (September 2019), in The New Yorker
- "The Girls Who Fainted at the Sight of an Egg" (January 2018), in The New Yorker
- "Sister Outsider" (April 2016), at The Chimurenga Chronic
- "Nigeria's New Feminism – Say-You-Are-One-Of-Us-Or-Else" (October 2016), at KTravula
- "Mother Hunger" (November 2015), on Medium
- "Fish Soup as Love Potions" (March 2013), at The Chimurenga Chronic
- "Nollywood Kiss" (2011) at The Chimurenga Chronic
- "Giving It All Away in English" (March 2015) at The Chimurenga Chronic
- "High Heeled Fork" (December 2015) on Medium
- "Birthing The American" (December 2013), at The Chimurenga Chronic
- "Nigeria's Superstar Men of God" (April 2013) at The Chimurenga Chronic
- "Nigeria and a Culture of Disrespect" (August 2012), at Ikhide Ikheloa's blog
- "That Guy No Be Ordinary" (April 2016), at Chimurenga Chronic
- "Birth – A Story of Secrets" (8 September 2022), WePresent.

== Notable interviews/excerpts/reviews ==
- "Kitchen Cafe: Ghillie Basan speaks with author Yemisi Aribisala about Nigerian culture and cuisine"
- "An interview with Yemisi Aribisala: Food Assessor 2021 – André Simon Food and Drink Book Awards"
- "Cooking the Books with Gilly Smith"
- "To be a good artist, you need the superpower of storytelling"
- "My repression is as legitimate as your freedom": A Conversation with Yẹ́misí Aríbisálà on AfricanWriter.com
- "'People try to squeeze Nigerian food into an all-encompassing African label'" | Book excerpt in The Guardian, UK
- Q&A with TheGannet
- "Words Move More Deliberately Than Visual Images" | Interview in Short Story Day Africa.
- Calabar Witch by Akin Adesokan, in Chimurenga Chronic
- A Book for the Tasting by Kola Tubosun, on Village Factor
- Sanya Noel, "On Not Fitting In: An Interview with Yemisi Aribisala", Enkare Review, 11 February 2018.
- "'The pandemic helped me return to physical books': Yemisi Aribisala's First Draft", The Republic, 18 February 2022.
