= Olufemi Terry =

Sierra Leone-born writer

- Born: Sierra Leone
- Occupations: Writer, journalist
- Writing career
- Subject: African diaspora
- Notable works: "Stickfighting Days", The Sum of All Losses
- Notable awards: Caine Prize for African Writing (2010)

Olufemi TerryAudio is a Sierra Leone-born writer. He won the 2010 Caine Prize for African Writing for his second short story "Stickfighting Days", which was originally published in Chimurenga. The judges said he was "a talent with an enormous future". He hopes to publish his debut novel soon.

== Life ==
Terry was born in Sierra Leone but grew up in Nigeria, the United Kingdom, and the Côte d'Ivoire and studied at a university in New York, United States, before becoming a journalist in both Somalia and Uganda. He now lives in Stuttgart, Germany. He received an MA in creative writing at the University of Cape Town in 2008.

On 5 July 2010, Terry won the Caine Prize for African Writing, ahead of such other African writers as Ken Barris (South Africa), Lily Mabura (Kenya), Namwali Serpell (Zambia), and Alex Smith (South Africa). Judges chair and literary editor with The Economist, Fiammetta Rocco, said:

Ambitious, brave and hugely imaginative, Olufemi Terry's Stickfighting Days presents a heroic culture that is Homeric in its scale and conception. The execution of this story is so tight and the presentation so cinematic, it confirms Olufemi Terry as a talent with an enormous future.

Terry said he was "overwhelmed for at least the first hour". He received his prize of £10,000 in London. He may also spend a month in residence at Georgetown University in the United States.

Terry writes about the African diaspora. However, he believes it is "unhelpful" to view African writers as a unique grouping of their own, saying to the BBC's World Today, "There is a danger in seeking authenticity in African writing". He says the Caine Prize would be useful as it would assist in the publication of his debut novel, called The Sum of All Losses. Terry has published three other short stories: "Digitalis Lust" is an exploration of isolation set in Cape Town published in the Caine Prize's 8th annual collection, Jambula Tree; "Lamu Squat", written in 2006 and set in Lamu, Kenya, was published in the online magazine Guernica in early March 2011; and "Dark Triad", published in Blip Magazine (the new Mississippi Review) as well as in the Caine anthology To See the Mountain.

== Works ==
- "Stickfighting Days". The Guardian. London. 6 July 2010.
- "Losing Labels". BBC Focus on Africa Magazine Vol. 21. October 2010.
- "Austerity not ostentation". The Africa Report. 9 February 2011.
- "Lamu Squat". Guernica. 1 March 2011.
