= Makena Onjerika =

Kenyan writer

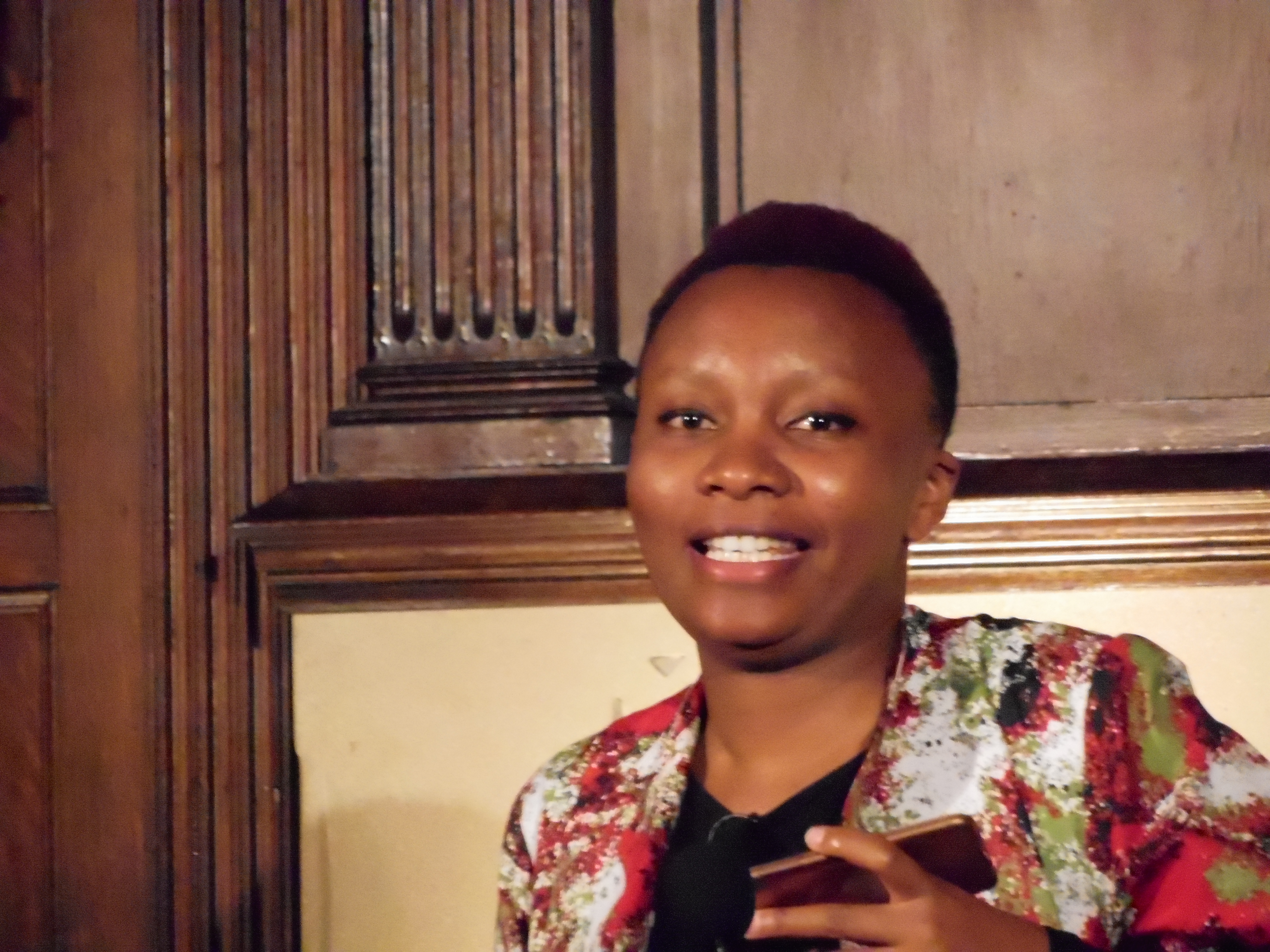
- Onjerika at Lannan Center Reading Series, Georgetown University, March 2019
- Born: 1980s
- Education: New York University
- Occupation: Writer
- Writing career
- Notable awards: Caine Prize (2018)

Makena Onjerika (born 1980s) is a Kenyan writer, who won the 2018 Caine Prize for African Writing, making her the fourth writer from her country to do so—following wins by Binyavanga Wainaina in 2002 and Yvonne Adhiambo Owuor in 2003, and Okwiri Oduor in 2013.

== Career ==
In July 2018, Makena won the Caine Prize for African Writing – often described as Africa's leading literary award – for her short story entitled "Fanta Blackcurrant", published in Wasafiri magazine (2017). The Chair of the Caine Prize judging panel, award-winning Ethiopian-American novelist and writer Dinaw Mengestu, announced Makena as the winner of the £10,000 prize at an award dinner. The ceremony was held for the second time in London University's Senate House, in partnership with SOAS and the Centre for African Studies. Mengestu praised the story in his remarks, saying: "...the winner of this year's Caine Prize is as fierce as they come – a narrative forged but not defined by the streets of Nairobi, a story that stands as more than just witness. Makena Onjerika's 'Fanta Blackcurrant' presides over a grammar and architecture of its own making, one that eschews any trace of sentimentality in favour of a narrative that is haunting in its humour, sorrow and intimacy." Onjerika told the BBC that she intended to donate half of her Caine Prize winnings to help rehabilitate street children.

Onjerika is a graduate of the MFA Creative Writing programme at New York University and has been published in outlets including Urban Confusions, Wasafiri, The Johannesburg Review of Books, The Adroit Journal, Fireside, Waxwing, Jalada, Doek! and Granta. She lives in Nairobi, Kenya, and is currently working on a fantasy novel. She is a contributor to the 2019 anthology New Daughters of Africa, edited by Margaret Busby.

Makena founded the Nairobi Fiction Writing Workshop and edited the anthology Digital Bedbugs, composed of the stories from the workshop.
