= Stickfighting Days =

Short story by Olufemi Terry

- Short story by Olufemi Terry
- Country: Sierra Leone
- Language: English

Publication
- Publisher: Chimurenga, Vol. 12/13
- Media type: Short story

"Stickfighting Days" is the second short story by Olufemi Terry from Sierra Leonean. It is the winner of the 2010 Caine Prize for African Writing. It was originally published in the pan-African magazine Chimurenga (vol. 12/13).

The story follows a group of glue-sniffing boys in a dump who fight with sticks. Terry said the story originally came into his head as "the idea of street boys in Nairobi, in rags, sniffing glue", adding: "The stickfighting element just popped into my head—there wasn't any obvious connection between the two strands, but somehow I found myself working with these two elements and the story just poured out of me".

"Stickfighting Days" won the Caine Prize for African Writing on 5 July 2010. It defeated shortlisted entries by writers from across Africa, including Ken Barris (South Africa), Lily Mabura (Kenya), Namwali Serpell (Zambia), and Alex Smith (South Africa). Fiammetta Rocco, the judges' chair and literary editor with The Economist, said: "Ambitious, brave and hugely imaginative, Olufemi Terry's 'Stickfighting Days' presents a heroic culture that is Homeric in its scale and conception. The execution of this story is so tight and the presentation so cinematic, it confirms Olufemi Terry as a talent with an enormous future".
