= One Day I Will Write About This Place =

2011 memoir by Binyavanga Wainaina

- Author: Binyavanga Wainaina
- Language: English
- Publisher: Graywolf Press
- Publication date: July 19, 2011
- Pages: 272
- ISBN: 978-1-55597-591-3

One Day I Will Write About This Place is a 2011 memoir by Binyavanga Wainaina. It was Wainaina's first book. In 2014, Wainaina publicly came out as gay by publishing a "lost chapter" of the book online as the essay "I am a homosexual, mum".

== Contents ==
In his memoir, Binyavanga Wainaina describes his childhood and journey to becoming a writer. He also writes about his adult life and provides commentary about the world around him. The memoir is told in the first-person present.

Wainaina begins by recounting his childhood in Nakuru, Kenya, where his mother ran a hair salon and his father ran the country's Pyrethrum Board, a farmer's cooperative. As a child, he loved reading romance books and dreamed about becoming a writer. He describes his youth as mostly happy. Wainaina's mother was from Uganda, and he recounts a memory of his neighbour accosting his mother over her origin. He was named after his mother's mother, and recalls how his Ugandan first name has made him stand out from his peers. He recalls the languages, pop culture, and influences of his youth. In one memory, Wainaina recalls his perception of some Swedish developers publicising their cow manure fuel system that they were installing in Nakuru. He describes watching the funeral of Jomo Kenyatta, Kenya's first president, on television and pondering the relationship between Kenya and Kenyatta. Wainaina recounts his childhood scepticism over the mixture of Kenyan traditions and music portrayed during the funeral. He also talks about his own family names, and how his father's siblings needed to adopt Western names and choose a surname when they attended colonial schools.

After Kenyatta's death, Daniel arap Moi became president. He was a member of the Kalenjin ethnic group, rather than a Kikuyu like Kenyatta and Wainaina's father. The Kikuyu lost political favour, and Wainaina recounts how he was not able to attend elite high schools even with good grades. He later decided to attend college in South Africa, studying finance. He attended the University of Transkei just before South African apartheid fell. Wainaina describes a period of depression, prompted by his studies and distance from home. Rather than focusing on school, he read works by Saul Bellow and Nadine Gordimer from bed. He recounts returning to Kenya when his parents worried about his progress in school, and beginning to write as he travelled with his father for the farmer's cooperative. When he returned to South Africa, he continued writing rather than finishing his finance degree. He lived in South Africa for nine years as Kenya faced political unrest, and he writes about his deepening disillusionment with Kenyan politics and economics. At the same time, he recounts feeling liberated by the post-apartheid experiences he had in South Africa. Wainaina continues to comment on his perceptions of Africa from his later position of teaching and writing in New York.

== Creation ==
Wainaina wrote his memoir over seven years. He said that he was interested in writing a book that could connect with and feel familiar to anyone. He had previously gained fame for winning the Caine Prize, co-founding Kwani?, and publishing the satirical essay "How to write about Africa". Since then, he recounted that he had received many requests to write a monumental African novel, but that he wanted to write something else. He attempted many variations of the memoir, seeking a riskier narrative than the short stories he had recently published, and the final memoir represented a drastic editing of more experimental drafts.

Gloria Kiconco described the book as written mostly for Africans. Wainaina's imagined audience was himself as a nine-year-old, or similar kids. He included some "call-ups", or symbols that are present and accessible to certain types of Kenyan readers. He wrote the book in English but describes the language as removed from many Kenyan spaces because it is currently always used as a language of power, authority and class. He notes that many Kenyan emotional places can't be described in English

Wainaina began publishing the book as an extension of his first published work, "Discovering Home": the essay that won him the Caine Prize.

== Publication ==
One Day I Will Write About This Place was published by Graywolf Press on July 19, 2011.

== Reception ==
Alexandra Fuller praised the memoir for The New York Times, saying that it brimmed with "insouciant virtuosity" and exceeded the promise of his earlier works: "Discovering Home" and "How to Write About Africa". Kirkus Reviews noted the work's playful use of language, along with its vividness and occasional surreal aspects. Marx Dorrity, for Chronogram, praised the memoir's perspective on the world around Wainaina. Caitlin L. Chandler, for Africa Is a Country, also appreciated the book's blending of personal coming-of-age story with political observation. Chandler noted its humour, playful, and clever writing. Helon Habila, for The Guardian, found that the book's insights and commentary came through best when Wainaina portrayed his adulthood and transitioned away from the language of childhood. Habila loved the book's critical insights, but thought the book ranged widely over themes and form, less focused than memoirs like Wole Soyinka's, Philippe Wamba's, and Eva Hoffman's. Elizabeth Lowry, for the London Review of Books, admires Wainaina's voice and playfulness as he raises deep questions and insights through his stories. Magnus Taylor, for African Arguments, held the book as one-of-a-kind in its energy and insight.

The memoir was shortlisted for the 2012 Non-fiction Hurston/Wright Legacy Award. The Oprah Magazine chose the memoir for its summer reading list. One Day I Will Write About This Place was also named a 2011 New York Times notable book.

== Lost chapter ==
Wainaina published the essay "I am a homosexual, mum" on January 19, 2024, for Africa Is a Country and two other websites. He presented it as a lost chapter to his memoir. Wainaina came out publicly with this essay.

In the essay, Wainaina imagines coming out to his mother at her deathbed: she died in Nairobi in 2000. He then shares what actually had happened: she died while he was stuck in South Africa, unable to get a visa in time to see her. He states that he had known he was gay since he was five years old, and recalls childhood memories of realising his sexuality, as well as his first sexual experience with a man in London. Wainaina ends the essay:

I am five when I close my self into a vague happiness that asks for nothing much from anybody. Absent-minded. Sweet. I am grateful for all love. I give it more than I receive it, often. I can be selfish. I masturbate a lot, and never allow myself to crack and grow my heart. I touch no men. I read books. I love my dad so much, my heart is learning to stretch. I am a homosexual.

=== Motivation ===
Wainaina released six YouTube videos days after publishing the essay, explaining his decision to come out in more detail. He describes attending the funeral of a gay friend, Kalota, whose sexuality was hidden and disparaged during the service. Later, Wainaina and others arranged a private service for Kalota, which was ignored by their local church, and Kalota's parents are pushed from their church as well. In the videos, Wainaina discusses religion, obedience, demons, politics, hate, and imagination. In later interviews, he described his caution in speaking about homophobia and sexuality in Africa, worrying about how Western politics would take advantage of his essay for their own stereotyping and treatment of the continent.

Wainaina came out as gay from Nairobi, at a time when homosexuality was criminalised in Kenya.

=== Reception ===
Wainaina received international news coverage for his coming-out essay and prompted more people to share their stories of coming out. A Kenyan newspaper reported that Wainaina's sexuality had been the subject of rumour for years, and his essay became a major news story in Nairobi for the next few days. His friends threw him a surprise party to honour his coming out and birthday, also eliciting international attention. His essay also elicited homophobic condemnation.

Wainaina was named a member of TIME Magazine's 100 Most Influential People in 2014 by Chimamanda Ngozi Adichie for coming out publicly.

=== Analysis ===
Because the essay was shared as a "lost chapter" of his memoir, it created a new lens to read the earlier work by, as a queer narrative. Professor Taiwo Adetunji Osinubi wrote that "the letter has become its complementary counterpoint text. When the memoir is read alongside Wainaina's public affirmations of his homosexuality and his defense of LGBTQ rights to dignity and sexual expression in Africa, it becomes obvious that the book's strategic exploration of the links between freedom from sexual and gender constraints and the larger realization of a democratic nation-state with guaranteed freedoms for the individual gestures toward a future community in which such freedoms are acquired."
