= Molotov Cocktail (disambiguation) =

Molotov cocktail is a generic name used for a variety of bottle-based improvised incendiary weapons.

Molotov Cocktail may also refer to:

- Molotov Cocktail (magazine), a quarterly magazine published in South Africa
- Molotov Cocktail Party, a 1994 album by post-hardcore band Frodus

== See also ==
- Cocktail Molotov, a 1980 French film
- Molotov Cocktease, a fictional character from The Venture Bros.
