= Ntone Edjabe =

Cameroonian journalist (born 1970)

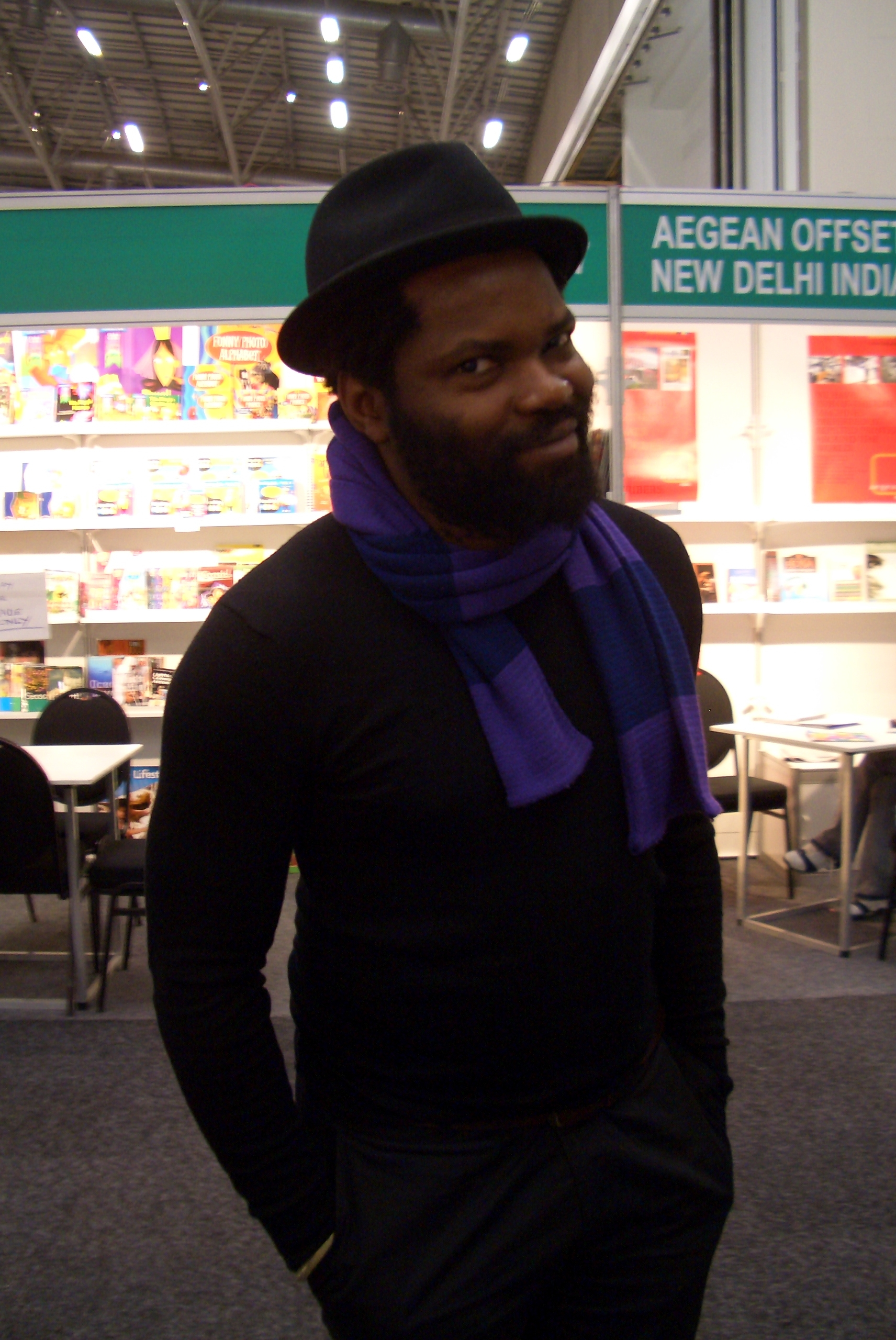
- Born: 1970 (age 55–56); Douala, Cameroon
- Occupations: Writer, journalist, DJ
- Writing career
- Notable work: Chimurenga magazine

Ntone Edjabe (born 1970) is a Cameroonian writer, journalist, DJ and founding editor of Chimurenga magazine.

== Life and career ==
Ntone Edjabe was born in Douala, Cameroon, and he moved to Lagos, Nigeria, where he began his studies. In 1993, he interrupted his studies to move to South Africa. He works as a journalist, writer, DJ, and basketball coach.

In 1997, he became co-founder and manager of the Pan African Market, a commercial and cultural space located in Long Street in the centre of Cape Town. In 2002, he founded Chimurenga magazine. In 2004, he was facilitator of Time of the Writer, and in 2007 he participated in its 10th edition at the Centre for Creative Arts of the University of KwaZulu-Natal. Edjabe is co-founder and member of the DJ collective Fong Kong Bantu Soundsystem.

In 2009, he was Massachusetts Institute of Technology Abramowitz Artist-in-Residence.

== Recognition ==
In 2011, Edjabe won the Principal Award of the Prince Claus Awards, with his Chimurenga platform. In 2017, he was a member of the international jury that selected Anne Imhof as recipient of the Golden Lion for best national participation in the 57th Venice Biennale.

== Works ==
In 2002, Edjabe became founder and director of Chimurenga magazine and curator of the series of publications African Cities Reader with Edgar Pieterse. He co-presented the radio programme Soul Makossa on Bush Radio 89.5, a station based in Cape Town. He is curator with Neo Muyanga of the Pan African Space Station (PASS). Among the publications to which he contributes are Politique africaine, L'Autre Afrique and BBC Focus on Africa.

=== Essays and articles ===
- "In Search of the Lost Rhythm", in Coffeebeans Routes cc, Cape Town.
- "Restate the focus to shape local polemic", Artthrob, n. 71, July 2003.
- "Corps ville violence Why blackman dey carry shit", in Politique africaine, Issue 100 Cosmopolis: de la ville, de l'Afrique et du monde, ed. Dominique Malaquais, Karthala Editions, 2006.

== Bibliography ==
- Dídac P. Lagarriga, "Chimurenga: who no know go know; An interview with Ntone Edjabe", in Africaneando, Revista de actualidad y experiencias, 2004.
- Trebor Scholz, "Chimurenga: Cape Town Now! Politics, Music, Culture: An interview with Ntone Edjabe", CTheory.net, 19/06/2002.
- Ntone Edjabe, "Chimurenga, Felasophy and the Quest for Lightness in the New South Africa", conferenza, MIT, 31/05/2009.
- "The New South Africa with Ntone Edjabe - Kwaito's Influence on SA Lit", 7:12m, Studio 360 (radio), 25/06/2010.
- Elissa Schappell and Rob Spillman, "The continental shelf", in Vanity Fair, July 2007.
