= Okwiri Oduor =

Kenyan writer (born 1988)

Okwiri Oduor (born 1988/1989) is a Kenyan writer, who won the 2014 Caine Prize for African Writing for her short story, ‘My Father’s Head’. In April 2014 she was named on the Hay Festival's Africa39 list of 39 Sub-Saharan African writers aged under 40 with potential and talent to define trends in African literature, with her story "Rag Doll" being included in the subsequent anthology edited by Ellah Allfrey, Africa39: New Writing from Africa South of the Sahara.

== Life ==
She was born in Nairobi, Kenya. Her novella The Dream Chasers was highly commended in the 2012 Commonwealth Book Prize. Her 2014 Caine Prize entry, "My Father's Head" uses a beautiful and experimental language to explore the theme of loss and repressed memory. She became the third Kenyan winner of the prize after Binyavanga Wainaina in 2002 and Yvonne Adhiambo Owuor in 2003. Oduor is a 2014 MacDowell Colony fellow. She published her debut novel, Things They Lost, in 2022.
