= Adesokan =

- Gender: Male
- Language: Yoruba

Origin
- Origin: Nigerian
- Meaning: The crown [as a symbol of nobility] is not unified,
- Region of origin: South West, Nigeria

Adéṣọ̀kàn is a Nigerian name of Yoruba origin, serving as a given name and surname. It means "The crown [as a symbol of nobility] is not unified, i.e. cannot be monopolized.". Adéṣọ̀kàn is a powerful name with depth and profound meaning, which in other words means, "the obtainment of title is not only hereditary, which is perhaps another way of saying that no one is born to rule.". This name is common among the Ilesha people of the Southwest, Nigeria.

== Notable individuals with the name ==
- Akin Adesokan, Nigerian Writer and Scholar
- Dorcas Ajoke Adesokan (born 1998), Nigerian Badminton Player
- Yakubu Adesokan (born 1979), Nigerian Paralympic Powerlifter
- David Adesokan (born 1975), Nigerian Gospel Artist
- Danielle Adesokan, Nigerian Track and Field Athlete and Entrepreneur
