= Fiifi Anaman =

Ghanaian writer and TV presenter

Fiifi Anaman is a Ghanaian sports journalist, writer, and television presenter known for his work in sports broadcasting, long-form journalism, and football analysis. He has worked with several media organisations in Ghana and internationally.

== Early life and career ==
Fiifi Anaman built his reputation as a sports journalist by starting as a blogger, writing football essays after graduating from High school in 2012. He then had the opportunity to freelance for Goal.com, which opened doors to work with international media platforms such as BBC, SuperSport, The Blizzard, and Africa Is a Country. His work covering Ghana during the 2014 FIFA World Cup led to assignments with FIFA, ESPN, and The Telegraph (UK). Anaman is the author of a book titled The Black Star. This book documents the life of African football legend C.K. Gyamfi and was published after seven years of work.

== Awards ==
In 2015, Anaman won the Sports Pearl Award for an article published in Allsports Ghana. He was shortlisted as a finalist in the CNN/MultiChoice African Journalist Awards.
