= The Dragonfly Sea =

2019 novel by Yvonne Adhiambo Owuor

- First edition cover
- Author: Yvonne Adhiambo Owuor
- Publisher: Knopf Publishers
- Publication date: March 12, 2019
- ISBN: 978-0-451-49404-7

The Dragonfly Sea is a coming-of-age family novel by Kenyan writer Yvonne Adhiambo Owuor. It was published by Knopf Publishers, imprint of Penguin Random House, in 2019.
