= The Liberator Magazine =

The Liberator Magazine, LLC
- Categories: Art, Culture, Design, Land, Nature, Travel, Music, Film, Literature, Politics, Education, Social issues, Africana studies, Popular culture
- First issue: July 21, 2002
- Country: United States
- Website: liberatormagazine.com

The Liberator Magazine is a publication/production company started by Brian Kasoro, Gayle Smaller, Tazz Hunter, Kenya McKnight, Marcus Harcus and Mike Clark in Minneapolis, Minnesota, USA. The company's first release was published July 21, 2002. Originally known as The Minneapolis Liberator, the company's name was later changed to The Liberator Magazine when it was incorporated and expanded onto the internet.

== Featured interviews ==
Al Franken, Askia Toure, Brent "Siddiq" Sayers (founder of Rhymesayers Entertainment), Brian Jackson, Brother Ali, Cee Lo, Chuck D, Cody Chesnutt, David Banner, Don Samuels, Game Rebellion, Grandmaster Flash, George Clinton, I-Self Devine, James Spooner, Jeff Chang (journalist), J Davey, Kara Walker, Kevin Willmott, K'naan, K-os, M-1 (rapper) (of Dead Prez), Malidoma Patrice Somé, Method Man, Mumia Abu-Jamal, Nathalie Johnson-Lee, Nikki Giovanni, Rahki, Runoko Rashidi, Saul Williams, Stic.man (of Dead Prez), Talib Kweli, The Slack Republic, Whodini

== Events ==
Twin Cities Community Forum (August 19, 2006), Live From Planet Earth (periodically)

== Notable contributors ==
- Stephanie Joy Tisdale
- Kamille Whittaker
- Nikki Pressley - Darrow School
- Dr. Greg Kimathi Carr - Howard University
- Dr. Melvin Barrolle - Morgan State University
- Mũkoma wa Ngũgĩ (son of Ngũgĩ wa Thiong'o) - Cornell University
- Michael J. Wilson - New York City College of Technology
- Tanya Morgan
- Keith Knight (cartoonist)
- Dr. Josh Myers - Howard University
- Dr. Anyabwile Aaron Love - Pennsylvania State University
- Dr. Abdul M. Omari - University of Minnesota
- Dr. Melisa Riviere - University of Minnesota
- Jon Jon Scott
- Charlotte Hill O'Neal (wife of Pete O'Neal) - United African Alliance Community Center
- Anthony Bottom aka Jalil Abdul Muntaqim
- Peter S. Scholtes - City Pages
- Joseph Lamour - MTV News, Today (American TV program)
- Danielle Scruggs - LivingSocial
- Jamilah Lemieux - Ebony (magazine)

== Honors ==
- 2010 Induction into the Chimurenga (magazine) Library
- 2012 Stocked at MoMA PS1 Artbook
