= Vauhini Vara =

Canadian/American author and journalist

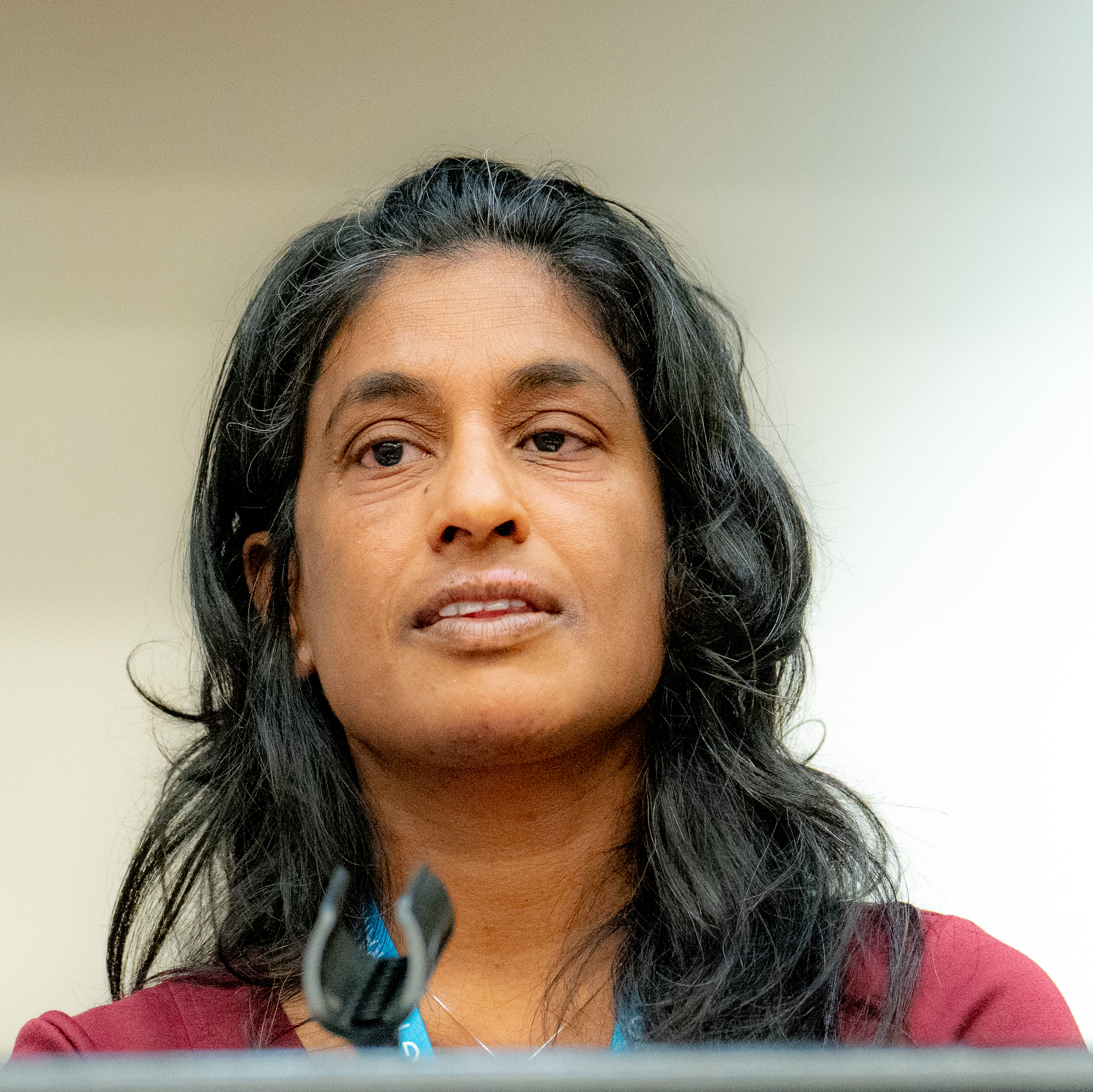
Vara at AWP 2026

Vauhini Vara is a Canadian and American journalist and author. She has written and edited for The Atlantic, The New Yorker, and The New York Times Magazine. Her debut novel, The Immortal King Rao was a finalist for the 2023 Pulitzer Prize for Fiction.

== Early life and education ==
Born in Regina, Saskatchewan, Canada to Indian immigrants, Vauhini Vara was raised in Prince Albert, Saskatchewan, Canada, and in Edmond, Oklahoma and Seattle, Washington in the United States. After graduating from Stanford University in 2004, she became a technology reporter for The Wall Street Journal. In 2008 she took a leave of absence from the WSJ to attend the Iowa Writers' Workshop. She graduated with her MFA in 2010 and then returned to the WSJ for the next three years.

== Career ==
Vara was a technology reporter at The Wall Street Journal for almost ten years, covering Silicon Valley and California politics. In 2013, she left The Wall Street Journal to work at The New Yorker's website. She has also published articles in The New York Times Magazine, The Atlantic, Harper's Magazine, Fast Company, Bloomberg Businessweek, WIRED, and elsewhere.

Vara is a recipient of the O. Henry Award for her story "I Buffalo". She has published stories in Tin House, ZYZZYVA, and other publications, and her fiction writing has received honors from the Rona Jaffe Foundation, the Canada Council for the Arts, MacDowell, and Yaddo. In 2021, she wrote the viral piece "Ghosts", a nine-part essay about losing her older sister to cancer, using an early model of GPT-3, the AI that would become ChatGPT.

Vara is a Visiting Assistant Professor of English at Colorado State University for 2023-24.

Her debut novel, The Immortal King Rao, was published in 2022. It was a finalist for the Pulitzer Prize for Fiction and was shortlisted for the National Book Critics Circle's John Leonard Prize and the Center for Fiction's First Novel Prize. In India, the novel won the Atta Galatta-Bangalore Literature Festival Book Prize and the Times of India AutHer Award. Wiip is developing a television series based on the book. In 2023, Vara released a short story collection, This Is Salvaged.

== Journalism and Controversies ==
In October 2026, Vara published an article in The Atlantic titled "Yet another literary prize winner seems to be AI", in which she stated that The Blue Fighter, a short story by Zimbabwean author Simbarashe Kundizeza that had won the 2026 Caine Prize for African Writing days earlier, appeared to be almost entirely artificially generated. Vara wrote that the story was "maudlin and full of tired tropes" and suggested that Kundizeza had written "The Blue Fighter" using artificial intelligence, due to the "proliferation of language that is common in AI-produced writing". She added that almost the entire story had been flagged as AI-generated by the detector software Pangram.

Kundizeza denied using generative AI, stating that the story was entirely his own work. Members of the literary community criticized the article for relying on AI-detection software and argued that Black and African authors were being unfairly singled out by such allegations. Following a month-long investigation—which included interviews with Kundizeza, the 2026 judging panel, and the story's original publisher, The Shallow Tales Review, alongside an independent metadata analysis of his drafts—the Caine Prize formally cleared Kundizeza in November 2026, concluding that The Blue Fighter was "human-written".

== Personal life ==
Vara is on the board of the Krishna D. Vara Foundation. She lives in Colorado with her husband Andrew Foster Altschul. They have one son.

== Bibliography ==
- The Immortal King Rao (2022)
- This Is Salvaged (2023)
- Searches: Selfhood in the Digital Age (2025)
