= Bushra Elfadil =

Sudanese writer and academic (born 1952)

Bushra ElFadil
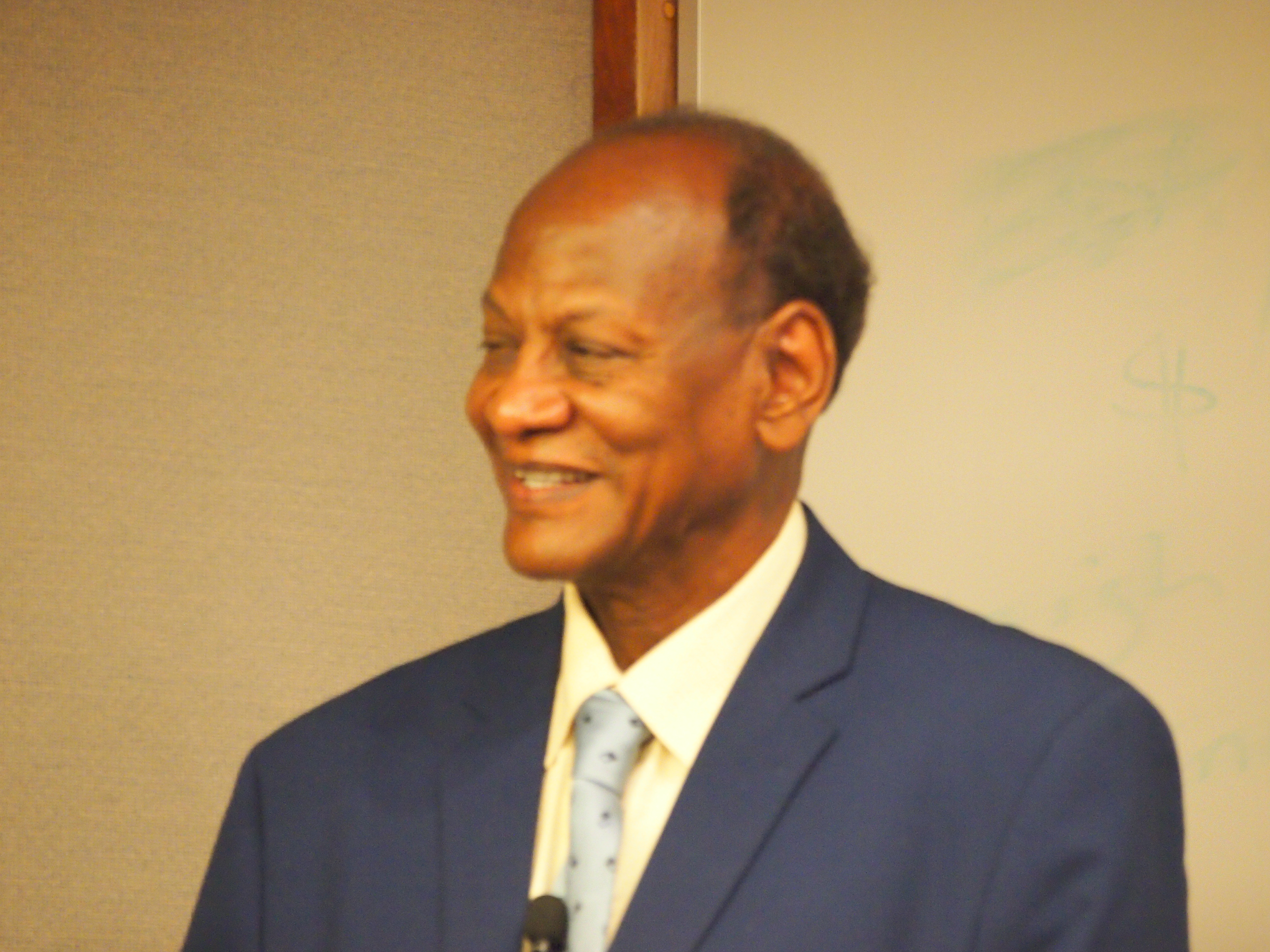
- Native name: بشرى الفاضل
- Born: Bushra Elfadil; 1952 (age 72–73); Araggi, Northern State of Sudan
- Occupation: writer, former lecturer in Russian
- Years active: 1970–

Bushra Elfadil, also spelled Bushra al-Fadil (Arabic: بشرى الفاضل, born 1952 in Araggi, Sudan) is a Sudanese writer. He has published several collections of short stories and novels in Arabic, with some of his stories translated into English, including anthologies of contemporary fiction from Sudan. In 2017, he was awarded the Caine Prize for African Writing.

== Career ==
Elfadil was born in 1952 in the village of Araggi in the Northern State of Sudan. Later, he moved with his family to the village of Wad El-Bor in the state of Al Jazirah in central Sudan, where he received his primary education.

He studied in Moscow and received his PhD in Russian language and literature. When he returned to Sudan, he was appointed as lecturer in the department for Russian language in the Faculty of Arts at Khartoum University. After protests against the military government of Omar al-Bashir in the early 1990s, he was expelled from that university, along with other lecturers and hundreds of students.

== Personal life ==
Elfadil has a daughter and four sons. Two of them, Basil and Bahir pursue careers as medical doctors. In 2018, he emigrated to Toronto in Canada, and currently lives there.

== Recognition ==
In 2012, he was awarded the El-Tayeb Salih Prize for Creative Writing in Arabic by the Sudanese ministry of culture. Further, he was the first writer in Arabic to win the Caine Prize for African Fiction in 2017 with "The Story of the Girl Whose Birds Flew Away", published in The Book of Khartoum - A City in Short Fiction. In a review, this story was characterised as follows: "...the winning story is one that explores through metaphor and an altered, inventive mode of perception – including, for the first time in the Caine Prize, illustration – the allure of, and relentless threats to freedom." In 2016, his story "Two spaces objects over Bandar" was published in Literary Sudans: An Anthology of Literature from Sudan and South Sudan.

== Works ==
Elfadil has published several collections of short stories and novels in Arabic:

- Hikkayat al-bint allati tarrat asafiraha (The story of the girl whose birds flew away) - short story
- Azrraq Alyamama
- Al-hossan al-tayer (The Flying Horse), a collection of children's stories
- Gassied fil zil (Poems in the shadow)
- Above a City’s Sky (2012)
