= The Immortal King Rao =

2022 debut novel by Vauhini Vara

- Author: Vauhini Vara
- Genre: Literary fiction, speculative fiction, climate fiction
- Publisher: W. W. Norton & Company
- Publication date: May 3, 2022
- Pages: 384
- ISBN: 978-0393541755
- Followed by: This Is Salvaged

The Immortal King Rao is a 2022 debut novel by Canadian and American writer Vauhini Vara, published by W. W. Norton & Company. The novel follows the legacy of King Rao, a tech CEO who motioned the world toward corporatocracy, as his daughter pens a letter about his rise to power. It was a finalist for the Pulitzer Prize for Fiction and shortlisted for the Center for Fiction First Novel Prize. A television series adaptation of the novel is forthcoming.

== Synopsis ==
The novel begins with King Rao's death and follows his daughter, Athena, after she has been imprisoned and injected with a substance that endows his memories to her. As she awaits judgment by a computer for a crime, and while the planet is facing collapse due to climate change, Athena writes to the Shareholders on the Board of Corporations in defense of herself and in reflection of her father's life, starting from his birth in a village in India to Dalit farmers.

== Critical reception ==
Kirkus Reviews noted that "Vara’s strengths are in her clever wordplay and trenchant observations of an algorithm-led dystopia" but questioned the sometimes stereotypical depictions of some minor characters. In a starred review, Publishers Weekly found Vara's debut "potent" and marveled at the execution of her "family portrait".

Critics in Vox and Vulture observed and lauded Vara's speculative approach to issues such as artificial intelligence, climate change, and capitalism. The New York Times called the novel "a monumental achievement: beautiful and brilliant, heartbreaking and wise". Bomb found it "Intensely imaginative, lyrically voiced, and gorgeously written". The Seattle Times commended Vara's choice to write the novel in the form of a letter addressed to the Shareholders. Alta Journal called the novel a "masterpiece."

The Guardian admired Vara's ambition but found that the novel "suffers from trying to take on too many ideas at once, with the novel’s sense of identity inevitably weakened as a result."

The novel was put on anticipated read lists by several publications, including Ms., The Denver Post, Bustle, and Lithub. The New York Times included it on their list of 100 Notable Books of 2022. NPR included it on their 2022 list of Books We Love. The Philadelphia Inquirer, Vox, and Esquire put it on their respective Best Books of 2022 lists.

== Influences ==
Vara cited her time working as a technology reporter for The Wall Street Journal as inspirational to her later envisioning the character of King Rao. She specifically came up with the idea for the novel while working on the short stories that would become her 2023 book, This Is Salvaged. At the time of writing, Vara read Moby-Dick for the first time which demonstrated to her what a novel about capitalism could look like.

Vara specifically got the idea for King Rao's memory technology after watching Battlestar Galactica and later researching documents produced by startups like Neuralink. With regard to the Board of Corporations and its Shareholders, Vara came up with them after thinking about Thomas Piketty's ideas about organized transnational capital in Capital and Ideology.

In researching Dalit life, Vara consulted her own father, Dalit scholars, and several books including but not limited to Viramma, Joothan, The Weave of my Life, Karukku, Ants Among Elephants, Coming Out as Dalit, and Caste Matters.

== Adaptations ==
In 2023, the studio Wiip acquired rights to Vara's novel and tapped screenwriter Madhuri Shekar to adapt it to screen. Shekar will also be an executive producer for the production. It is set to be developed into a television series.
