= Idza Luhumyo =

Kenyan short story writer (born 1993)

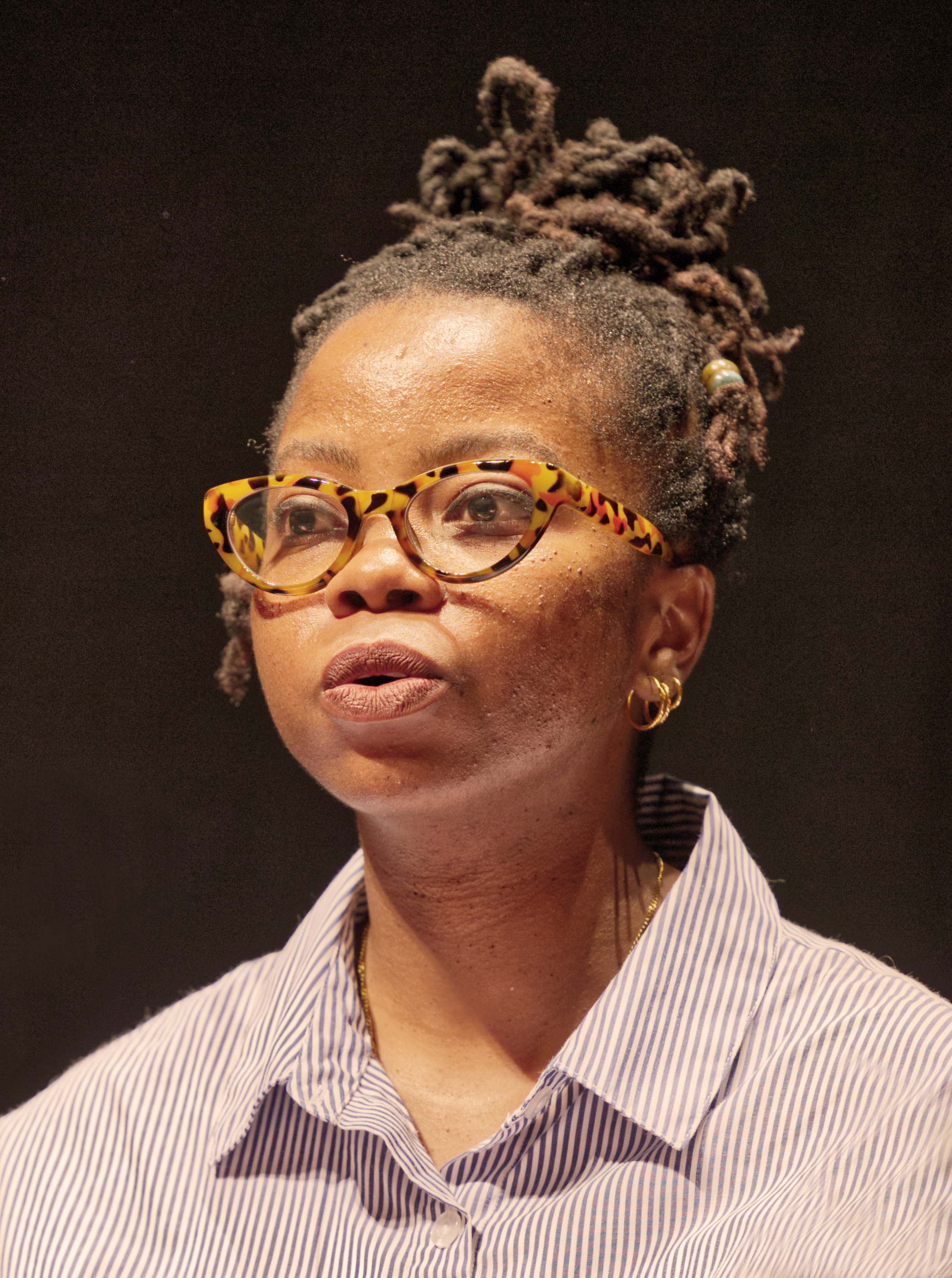
- Luhumyo (2023)
- Born: 1993 (age 32–33); Mombasa, Kenya
- Education: SOAS University of London; University of Nairobi; Texas State University MFA
- Occupations: Lawyer, Writer, Translator
- Writing career
- Notable awards: Short Story Day Africa Prize 2021; Caine Prize 2022
- Website: idzaluhumyo.com/home

Idza Luhumyo (born 1993) is a Kenyan short story writer, whose work explores Kenyan coastal identities. In July 2020, Luhumyo was announced as the inaugural recipient of the Margaret Busby New Daughters of Africa Award. She was the winner of the 2021 Short Story Day Africa Prize with her story "Five Years Next Sunday", which also won the 2022 Caine Prize.

== Life ==
Idza Luhumyo was born in Mombasa, Kenya, and holds a law degree from Nairobi University. She lives between Kilifi and Nairobi, and works as a screenwriter and copywriter. On 21 July 2020 it was announced that she was the first recipient of a scholarship enabled by the publication by Myriad Editions of Margaret Busby's 2019 anthology New Daughters of Africa and that Luhumyo would start postgraduate studies at SOAS University of London in autumn 2020, with accommodation provided by International Students House. Discussing her course, Luhumyo said: "My favourite thing about the MA Comparative Literature program is its interdisciplinarity. Sometimes I like to think of it as 'literature-without-borders meets critical theory,' which is just perfect."

Luhumyo went on to become a student and Rose Fellow in the MFA Creative Writing program at Texas State University.

Luhumyo's work has been published by Popula, Jalada Africa, The Writivism Anthology, Baphash Literary & Arts Quarterly, MaThoko's Books, Gordon Square Review, Amsterdam's ZAM Magazine, Short Story Day Africa, the New Internationalist, The Dark and African Arguments. Her work has been shortlisted for the Short Story Day Africa Prize, the Miles Morland Writing Scholarship, and the Gerald Kraak Award.

Luhumyo won the Short Story Day Africa Prize 2021 with "Five Years Next Sunday". In June 2022, the story was also announced on the shortlist for the Caine Prize, alongside stories by Joshua Chizoma, Nana-Ama Danquah, Hannah Giorgis and Billie McTernan. Luhumyo went on to become the winner, chosen out of 349 entries from 27 African countries. Chair of the Caine Prize judging panel Okey Ndibe described "Five Years Next Sunday" as an "incandescent" story, which used "exquisite language". Luhumyo was the fifth Kenyan writer to have been awarded the Caine Prize.

In December 2022, Luhumyo was listed by New African magazine as one of the "100 Most Influential Africans" of the year.
