= Glendora Review =

Nigerian magazine

- Editor: Dapo Adeniyi, Akin Adesokan, Michael Veal
- Frequency: Quarterly
- Founded: 1994
- Country: Nigeria
- Language: English

Glendora Review is a Nigerian magazine that publishes work relating to art, literature, and culture.

== Origins ==
The magazine was conceived in an atmosphere of intellectual crisis, following the brain drain from Nigeria, during the Sani Abacha regime. It was founded by Olakunle Tejuoso and his brother Toyin (whose family owns the Lagos alternative bookstore, after which the journal is named). Olakunle wanted to create a forum where people could access the work being done by Nigerian intellectuals who had fled the country, and a bridge for artistic theories and activities being propagated by African intellectuals in the West and their contemporaries at home.

Although it was initially focused on Nigeria's arts and cultures, Glendora grew into a pan-African journal, with regular features and interviews of icons such as Ngũgĩ wa Thiong'o, Mbongeni Ngema, Sembene Ousmane, Sun Ra, and other critical texts on African literature. The journal also included a books supplement. The last issue of Glendora appeared in 2004, and its publishers have since focused on the publication of books, such as Lagos: A City At Work on the West African megapolis, .

== Scope ==
Constantly engaging and interrogating the idea of Africa, as a contested and dynamic invention, Glendora Review provided a platform for intellectual discourse on literary, visual and performance cultures that are sensitive to the mutations and complexities of cultural work on the African continent in a global age. A strong aesthetic sense, coupled with an editorial style that (while rigorous) managed to avoid being too intellectual or esoteric, attracted a wide-ranging readership in Nigeria and abroad.

== Critical assessment ==
Reviewing the influence of Glendora on the younger generation of Nigerian writers, African Literature Today writes: "Indeed there may be said to be a Glendora Group or a Glendora Generation, made up of those who as critics or poets, and guided by Dapo Adeneyi, published in the journal."

== See also ==
- Black Orpheus
- Transition Magazine
