= Ikhide Ikheloa =

Nigerian writer and critic (born 1959)

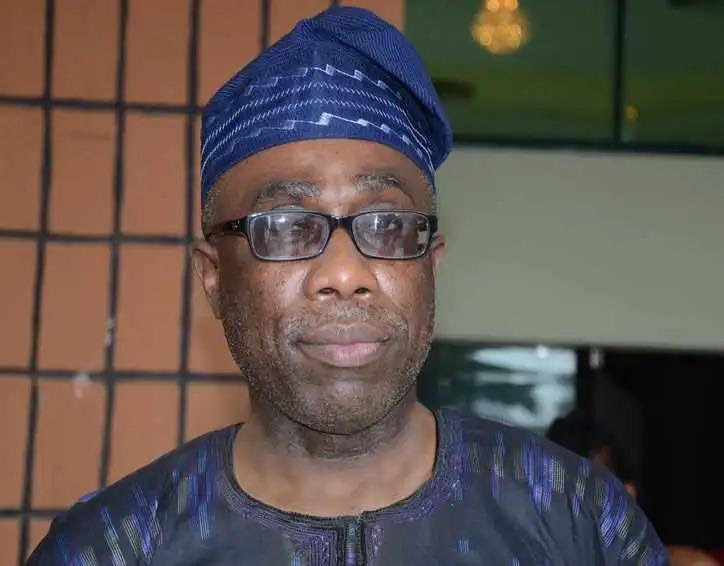
- Born: Ikhide Roland Ikheloa; February 14, 1959 (age 67); Ikeja Barracks, Lagos, Nigeria
- Education: University of Benin, 1979. (BSc). University of Mississippi, 1984. (MBA).
- Occupation: Writer. literary critic. civil servant
- Era: Third Generation
- Known for: Social and literary criticism
- Awards: Lifetime Award for Literary Criticism (James Currey Society).
- Website: www.xokigbo.com

Ikhide Roland Ikheloa (born 14 February 1959) is a Nigerian writer and literary critic who has worked in the American civil service since 1984. He is widely read and known in Anglophone Africa for his strong opinions on literature and politics, which have won him many admirers and also made him very controversial. While he is seen as a writer and critic by his admirers, this position has often been debated by his critics. But Ikheloa simply refers to himself as a reader who writes and is highly opinionated.

== Early life and education ==
Ikhide Ikheloa was born in Ikeja Barracks, Lagos, Nigeria, on 14 February 1959. His father was an itinerant policeman and his mother was a typist at the Lagos immigration office. As a result of his father's occupation, he was often transferred to different places across Southern Nigeria. Ikheloa earned a BSc in Biochemistry from the University of Benin in 1979.

He moved to the United States in 1982 to pursue a master's degree in Business Administration (MBA) at the University of Mississippi, from where he graduated in 1984.

== Career ==
Ikheloa is a writer who is widely known as a literary and social critic. He describes himself more as a writer who reads, though the common perception of him is of a writer who is a critic. His nonfiction pieces have been published in world-renowned magazines such as Guernica and Ecclectica; his political opinion pieces have been published in The Independent, UK, and the defunct NEXT newspaper, for which he claims to have written 150 pieces in three years. He has also written extensively for African Writer, Brittle Paper and other important African literary magazines.

Ikheloa is one of the most influential literary and social critics in Anglophone Africa. His essays on novels by African writers are widely read, and his opinions on books have often caused a stir in the literary world, including brief face-offs between him and the authors. In 2017, Ikheloa's essay on Fiston Mwanza Mujila's Tram 83 changed the conversation around the book forever.

Tram 83, having won the 2015 Etisalat Prize for Literature and been described by the Guardian as "the African novel wowing the literary world", looked set to become a classic. However, Ikheloa published an essay on his blog, pointing out the book's misogyny and inadequate portrayal of Africans as people who only eat, drink and have sexual intercourse. After a long argument, which took place for days in the media among some of Africa's biggest literary names, including Tsitsi Dangarembga, Petina Gappah, Zukiswa Wanner, Bwesigye Wa Mugire and Richard Oduor Oduku, the conversation around the book changed for ever.

Ikheloa is not just widely read, but prolific. He is said to have written on more books than any other critic within the past two decades.

He also writes on politics. It was during the political upheavals in Nigeria in the 1990s that his writing found life again after he became an activist. In the 1990s, after having lived in the United States for a decade, Ikheloa linked up with a few friends and bigwigs, including Wole Soyinka, Beko Ransome-Kuti, in a platform known as Naijanet to fight for MKO Abiola's stolen mandate.

They wrote and organised conferences, and traveled to reach people in the process. During Abacha's regime, Ikhide was a frequent guest at Radio Kudirat, one of the effective initiatives formed in Nigeria at the time to combat tyranny.

He has since continued to write about politics. He has said that although some friends entered politics in 1998, he held back in order to stay outside and work to hold folks accountable.

While Ikhide has often objected to being called a critic and styles himself "a reader who writes", his prolific work of literary criticism and commenting on social issues through books have earned him the status of a social critic and his unbridled opinions on books have led to him being called "Irreverent critic".

== Movements ==
Ikheloa has been known to champion the authentic African narrative, often willing to draw his dagger on writers and prizes which force writers to write in a certain way. In 2011, he criticised the Caine Prize for African Literature suggesting that "The creation of a prize for 'African writing' may have created the unintended effect of breeding writers willing to stereotype Africa for glory. The mostly lazy, predictable stories that made the 2011 shortlist celebrate orthodoxy and mediocrity.... The problem now is that many writers are skewing their written perspectives to fit what they imagine will sell to the West and the judges of the Caine Prize...."

In 2014, at the height of the build-up to the General elections in 2015, Ikheloa fell out with a large part of the literary society in Nigeria for fiercely opposing writers and literary community who supported General Muhammadu Buhari's Presidency.

In 2017, Ikheloa called for the boycotting of the Kaduna Books and Arts Festival (KABAFEST) in its inaugural year on the grounds that its host, Mallam Nasir El Rufai, was responsible for the more than 300 Shi'ite Muslims who were killed and buried in mass graves in Kaduna.

Ikheloa is a well known champion for telling stories on digital platforms. He believes that the internet is the future of storytelling and has often said that the book as we know it is dead, whereas ideas (as in the internet) live. He has been described by Alexander Fyfe as one of the most visible online critics, whose contribution to the literary discourse online has led to the increasing visibility of African literature in the internet.

In September 2022, at the James Currey Festival at the University of Oxford, England, Ikheloa, during his acceptance speech of the Lifetime Achievement Award for literary criticism, advocated for more digital publishing opportunities in Nigeria.

Ikheloa has once participated in the Esan collective, which was held online, an attempt to help the condition of plummeting Esan speakers.

In 2016, Ikhide was listed in the Guardian UK's "The Lagos Power List: The 21 people in 21 Million."

"Ikhide Ikheloa, better known as Pa Ikhide, is a maverick in a social media environment that usually takes one side or the other in Nigerian politics. Few manage to escape his damning critiques – including the country's often-overlooked intellectual elite. The 57-year-old's no-holds-barred approach has earned his Twitter account, @ikhide, a substantial following, many of whom are political officials awaiting his next tirade."

== Writings ==
Ikhide's writings mostly range between essays and creative non-fiction. He has been published in such reputable international journals as Ecclectica and Guernica.

=== Social media advocacy ===
Ikheloa is widely known for his social media advocacy. He has espoused that the best of African writing happening currently is no longer in books, but on the internet where people are free to write without pandering to anyone. He is famous for his controversial quips about how books are dying, but ideas live. Ikheloa's high regard of social media is closely related to the fact that he has built his literary career on social media, on his blog and social media accounts where he has thousands of followers and his pieces have been read by hundreds of thousands. His view relates that progress on the African literary front is closely tied to its acceptance of the present status quo. In his acceptance speech at the James Currey Literary Festival in the United Kingdom (UK), he said:

"The greatest tragedy of modern literature is that those who are invested in the past, those who are wedded to the book, hold strong sway over the trajectory of the world's stories. These powerful keepers of the gate of stories insist on reading to a bored, disengaged world, one-dimensional pap, milled from a flat world. Imagine where the world would be today if mathematicians had insisted on feeding us faded truths from the slide rule. Computers would be relegated to third class status to be patronized by the mummified wealthy. And we would not be here today... "On balance, the West has been supportive of African literature, but the Internet and social media house authentic African narrative, unlike the sanitized gruel from many traditional Western publishing houses. We must revive African narrative organically. Long live social media!"

In a 2014 interview with Moonchild, when asked about New Nigerian writing, Ikhide expressed his sentiment that the present generation was easily the most innovative generation when it came to writing. According to him, because of what they did with social media, a number of them could be considered geniuses.

== Awards ==
In September 2022, Ikheloa was honoured with a Lifetime Achievement Award in literary criticism at the James Currey Literary festival held at Oxford University, England.
