= Simbarashe Steyn Kundizeza =

Zimbabwean writer and editor

- Born: Zimbabwe
- Occupations: Writer and editor
- Notable work: Freelance
- Awards: Island Prize for Debut African Fiction (2024); Caine Prize for African Writing (2026)

Simbarashe Steyn Kundizeza is a Zimbabwean writer and editor based in Harare. He won the Caine Prize for African Writing in 2026 for his short story "The Blue Fighter", published in The Shallow Tales Review in 2025.

== Career ==
Kundizeza's debut novel manuscript, Freelance, won the 2024 Island Prize for Debut African Fiction.

His writings have appeared in Transition, the anthology The Wrong Patient and Other Stories from Africa, and The Shallow Tales Review. He was a finalist in the 2018 Africa Book Club Short Story Competition and participated in the 2025 LOATAD Black Atlantic Residency. He also serves as an associate editor at African Writer Magazine.

In 2026, Kundizeza was named the winner of the Caine Prize for African Writing, receiving the £10,000 award for "The Blue Fighter". Vauhini Vara wrote in The Atlantic that the story was "maudlin and full of tired tropes" and suggested that Kundizeza had written "The Blue Fighter" using artificial intelligence, due to the "proliferation of language that is common in AI-produced writing". She added that almost the entire story had been flagged as AI-generated by the detector software Pangram. Kundizeza denied the allegations and the Caine Prize said that it had initiated an investigation in response to Vara's article. Following a month-long internal investigation—which included interviews with Kundizeza, the 2026 jury, and the online literary magazine "The Shallow Tales Review", where the short story had first appeared, as well as an independent forensic metadata analysis of his draft texts—the Caine Prize Board of Trustees claims to have fully exonerated Kundizeza in November 2026. Chairwoman Ellah Wakatama stated the evidence was clear and that "The Blue Fighter" had been written by a human, and that Kundizeza therefore remained the rightful winner. Max Spero, the CEO of Pangram Labs, accused this statement by the Caine Prize of itself being AI-generated.
