= Unir Cinéma: Revue du Cinéma Africain =

Unir Cinema
- Editor: Pere Jean Vast, Pere Joseph Lambrecht
- Categories: Film Magazine
- Founded: 1973
- Final issue: 2000
- Company: Private
- Country: Senegal
- Language: French
- Website: Unir Cinéma

Unir Cinéma: Revue du Cinéma Africain was the first periodical entirely devoted to African cinema to come out of Francophone Africa. Its impact established it as an essential reference tool on cinema on the continent.

== Publishing ==
First published in 1973, this Senegalese film magazine was typewritten and duplicated through offset printing. Written by both Senegalese and French reviewers and published by the Catholic Information Center of the diocese of Saint Louis, it provided up to date filmographies of recent motion pictures as well as more detailed entries (including credits, filmmakers' biographies, film summaries and critiques) of the most significant cinematographic works by African filmmakers.

== Content and themes ==
Its detailed reports on film festivals throughout the world revealed the exposure and appreciation of African cinema on an international level, while its listings of places where African films have been or will be commercially exhibited attested to the scope of their circulation. Carefully prepared by-country dossiers revealed both the status of cinema in different regions and the efforts undertaken by local governments to promote the production and distribution of their films. While little effort was made to offer more in-depth critical insights into the thematics, aesthetics and ethics of African cinema, Unir Cinéma did furnish its readers with bibliographies of the latest articles on African cinema in international magazines and journals as well as the names of international periodicals with a serious interest in the critique of African films.

== Ending ==
First edited by Pere Jean Vast on tight budget in 1973 until 1996, later by Pere Joseph Lambrecht (1998–2000).

== Notes ==
- Unir Cinéma was initially (from no. 1 to 35) a general periodical titled Unir (L'Echo de Saint-Louis). In 1973 it switched focus exclusively to film and continued as Unir Cinema: Revue Du Cinéma Africain.
- Ecrans d'Afrique (Ouagadougou, Burkina Faso, 1992)
- Les 2 Ecrans: revue mensuelle de cinéma et de television (Zirout, Algiers, Algeria)
