= Revue Mfumu'eto =

Revue Mfumu’eto
- Editor: Jaspe-Saphir Nkou-Ntoula
- Categories: Comic book series
- Frequency: infrequently
- Company: Private
- Country: Democratic Republic of the Congo
- Language: Lingala

Revue Mfumu'eto is a comic magazine series first published in 1990 at Kinshasa, Democratic Republic of Congo (DRC) by Jaspe-Saphir Nkou-Ntoula under the pseudonym Papa Mfumu'Eto 1er, which he adopted as his brand along with many variations. He led a small creative team to publish a variety of extremely popular comic books in Kinshasa from 1989 to 2005. This series and others were written in urban Lingala (Kinshasa's Lingua franca includes Tshiluba and French words) and produced on inexpensive paper in the language of his neighborhood, explicitly to make it accessible to them. His comic books were self-produced using stencils, cut-and-paste (adhesive-taped) montages, photocopy machines, printed on lithographic presses, and distributed informally on the streets and in Kinshasa's open markets. The first story in the series, Nguma a meli mwasi na kati ya Kinshasa (“The python that swallowed a woman in Kinshasa”), seized readers’ attention in 1990 and was widely interpreted as a daring attack against the DRC's notorious dictator, Mobutu, bringing instant fame to the Revue and its creator.

Along with other low-cost and locally distributed comic books, Mfumu'eto's comics inaugurated the era of the author as the producer in the Democratic Republic of Congo's literary world. Like other comics produced in Kinshasa at the time they were heavily influenced by urban culture. Mfumu'Eto also drew inspiration from local traditions, combining African traditional medicine with religion, pulp fiction with politics, and irony with attitude. This culminated into an eclectic display that directly contested dominant colonial systems of knowledge. The author transferred his manuscript Papa Mfumu’eto 1er Papers to the University of Florida in April 2017, where they are physically preserved and digitized for public open access. Items from the Revue Mfumu'Eto series were exhibited in Paris with the creator's paintings in 2015, following the international success of popular painters such as Cheri Samba and growing interest in Congolese popular art.
