= Glänta =

Swedish cultural magazine

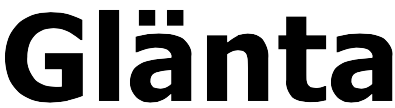

- Cover of issue 3-4, 2011. The theme of this issue was commitment.
- Editor: Göran Dahlberg
- Categories: Art and culture
- Frequency: Quarterly
- Circulation: 1500–2000
- Founder: Göran Dahlberg
- First issue: May 1993
- Company: Kulturföreningen Glänta
- Country: Sweden
- Based in: Gothenburg
- Language: Swedish
- Website: glanta.org
- ISSN: 1104-5205

Glänta is a Swedish quarterly cultural magazine published in Sweden. Glänta was established by Göran Dahlberg in 1993. He is also the editor of the magazine, which publishes articles about philosophy, politics, aesthetics, literature, art, and history. The editorial office is situated in Gothenburg, Sweden.

The Glänta philosophy bar existed between 1998 and 2002. It started in the autumn of 1998 at Atalante in Gothenburg, and from January 2000 it was also held every other week at Södra Teatern in Stockholm. Glänta is a contributing member of the cultural magazine network Eurozine. The magazine is published by the economic association Kulturföreningen Glänta. The association also operates an independent publishing house under the same name. In 2007, Glänta was one of about 90 selected magazines from around the world to participate in Documenta 12 magazines.

== See also ==
- List of magazines in Sweden
