= Africa Is a Country =

Opinion and analysis website

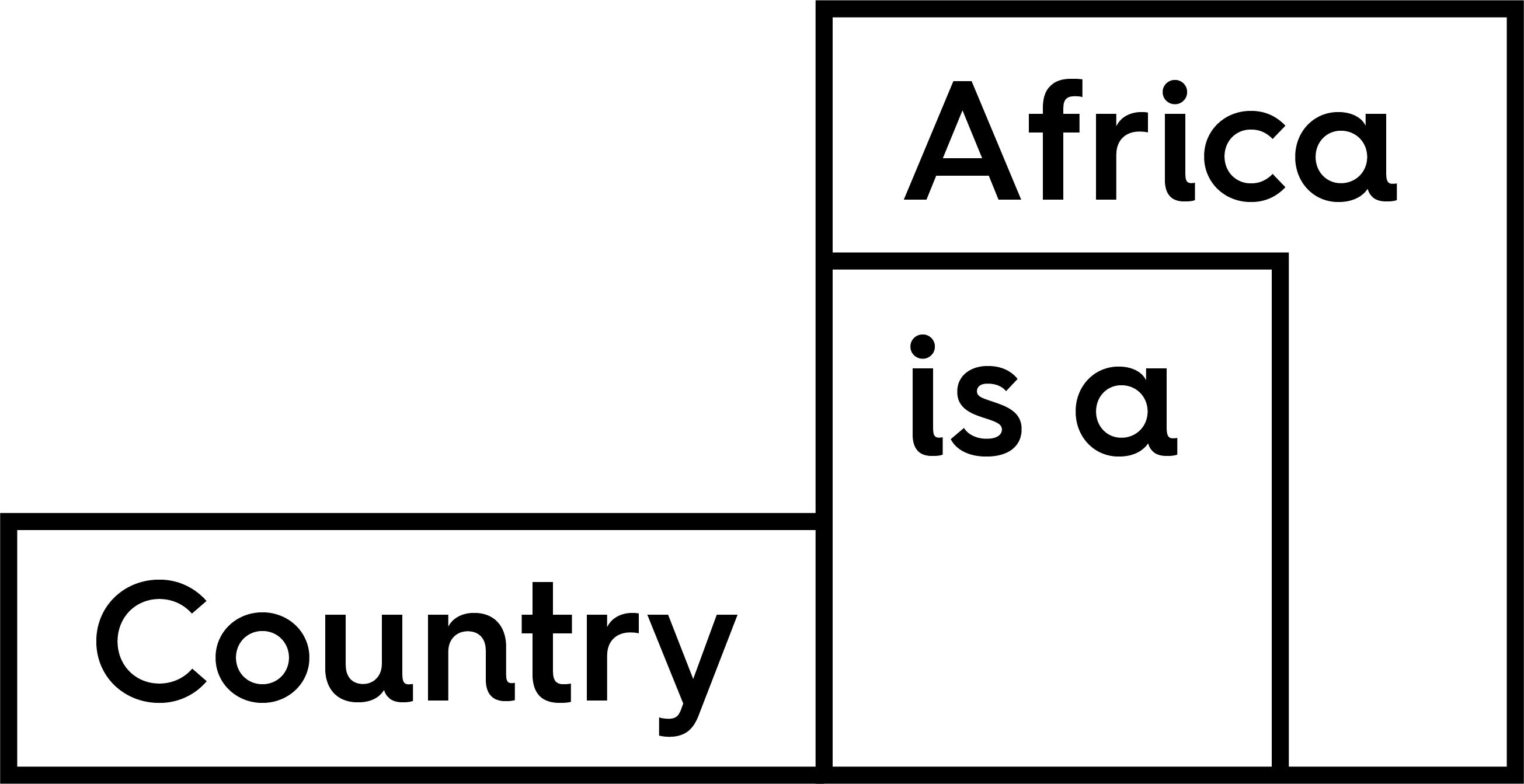

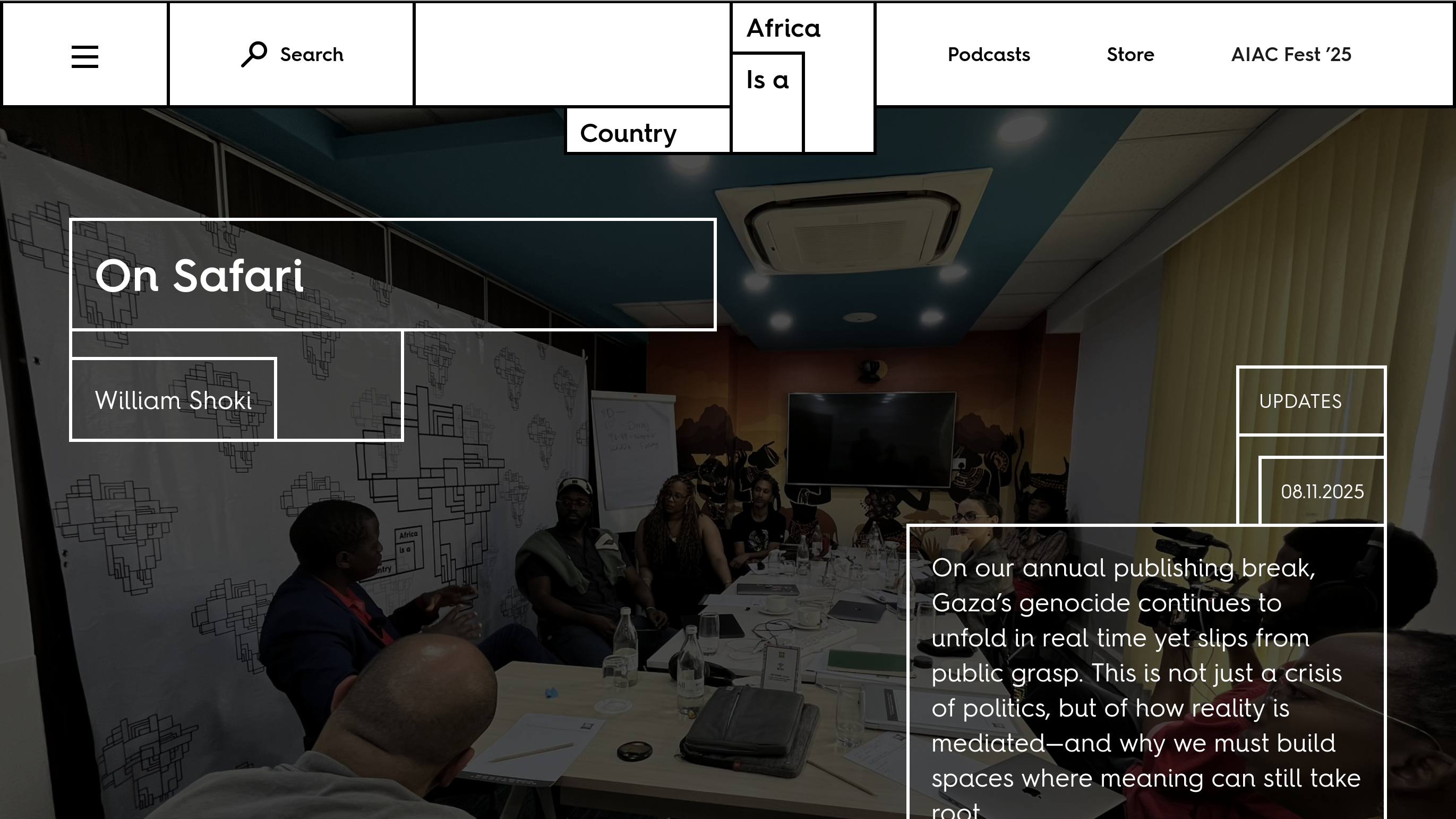
- Screenshot on 21 August 2025
- Website type: Opinion and analysis
- Founded: 2009
- Founder: Sean Jacobs
- Website: africasacountry.com
- Content license: CC BY 4.0

Africa Is a Country (AIAC) is an opinion and analysis website covering African politics, society, and culture. It was founded in 2009 by South African scholar of international affairs Sean Jacobs.

== History ==
Sean Jacobs first founded his blog Leo Africanus in 2005, which was named after the Moroccan-Andalusi geographer of the same name. Jacobs, who is a South African scholar of international affairs, started the blog with the purpose to correct misconceptions of Africa, similar to Africanus' book Description of Africa. After running the website alone for four years, he got "bored" and changed the name to Africa is A Country, which is considered the founding year of the website.

== Content ==
Africa Is a Country is an opinion and analysis website with a stated purpose of correcting misrepresentations about the African continent in the Western media from a leftist perspective informed by the experiences of the historical anti-Apartheid movement. The blog features diverse perspectives, including many young African diaspora authors, which discuss issues regarding the media, culture, politics, and society of Africa. Original content on the website is freely provided under a Creative Commons license. The title of the website is an ironic reference to the misconception that the continent of Africa is a single country, with an asterisked note reading "Not a continent with 55 countries".

== Affiliations ==
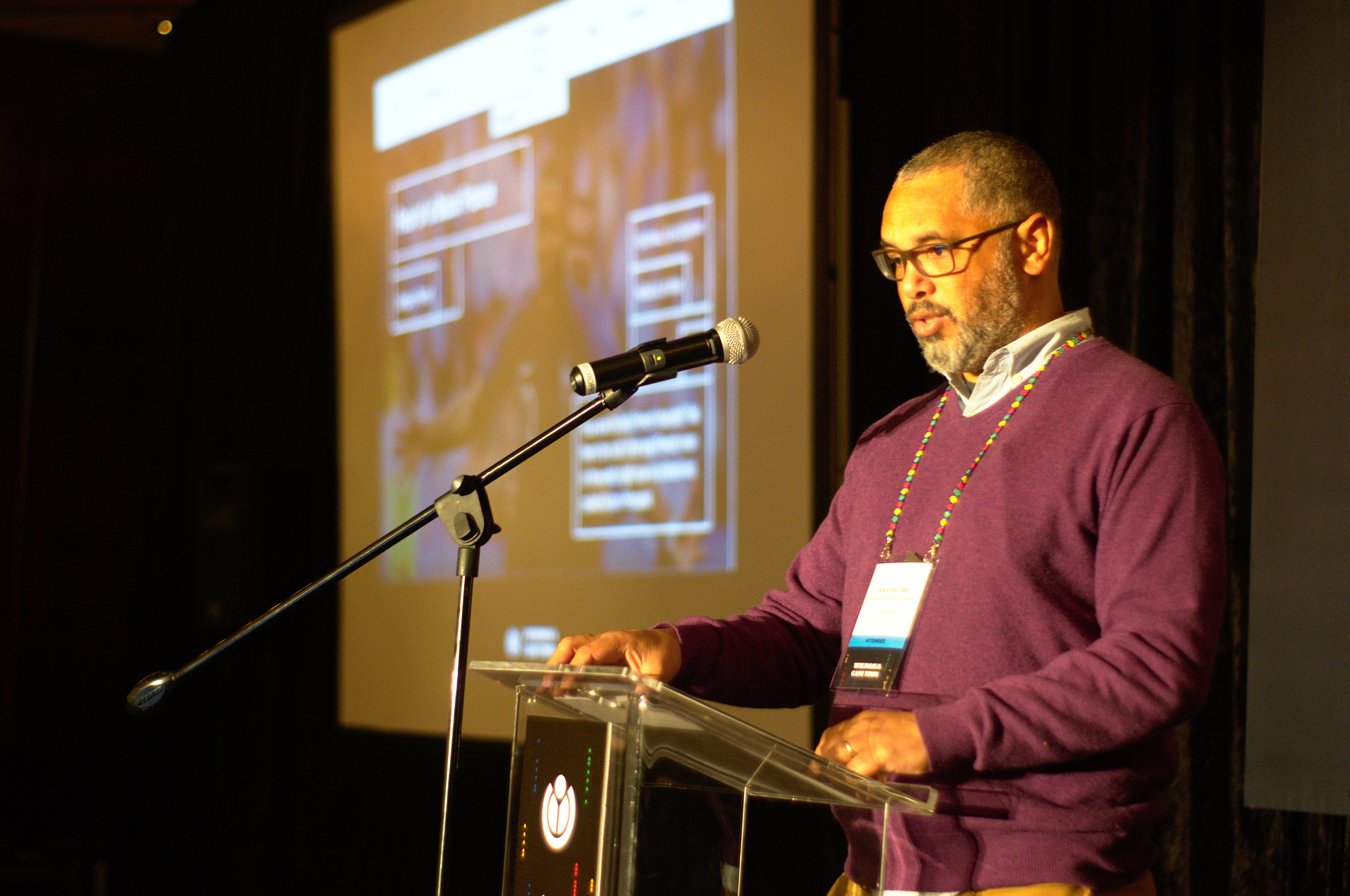
Sean Jacobs in 2018

AIAC receives funding from the Shuttleworth Foundation and Open Society Foundation, as well as logistical support from the Jacobin Foundation, a leftist media organization. The website is a member of the Progressive International's "Wire coalition".

== Reception ==
According to communication scholar Toussaint Nothias, AIAC is "a leading avenue in the African digital sphere" and has impacted media coverage of the continent. Lindsay Semel of Brittle Paper described the blog as "characterized by rigorous and lively writing, intentional web design, and a sharp social consciousness". Social researcher Yusuf Serenkuma likened AIAC to Binyavanga Wainaina's 2005 essay "How to Write About Africa".
