= Lily Mabura =

Kenyan writer

- Education: University of Nairobi (BS); University of Idaho (MFA); University of Missouri (PhD)
- Occupation: Writer
- Writing career
- Notable awards: Jomo Kenyatta Prize for Literature (2001)

Lily G. N. Mabura is a Kenyan writer known for her short story How Shall We Kill the Bishop, which was shortlisted for the Caine Prize in 2010.

== Career and education ==
Mabura earned a PhD in Engĺish from the University of Missouri, a Master of Fine Arts degree from the University of Idaho and a Bachelor of Science from the University of Nairobi. Her 2004 thesis was titled On the Slopes of Mt. Kenya. She is an author and academic, having taught at the University of Missouri and at the American University of Sharjah.

== Honours and awards ==
Mabura has received a number of awards including:

- Jomo Kenyatta Prize for Literature, Children's Winner 2001 for her book, Ali, the Little Sultan
- Kenya's National Book Week Literary Award for The Pretoria Conspiracy in 2001
- Ellen Meloy Fund for Desert Writers in 2007
- University of Rochester's Frederick Douglass Fellowship in 2008-2009

== Selected works ==
=== Articles ===
- Mabura, Lily (2008). "Breaking Gods: an African postcolonial Gothic reading of Chimamanda Ngozi Adichie's 'Purple Hibiscus' and 'Half of a Yellow Sun'". Research in African Literatures. 39 (1): 203–222. doi:10.2979/RAL.2008.39.1.203. OCLC 775273497. S2CID 197835535.
- Mabura, Lily G. N. (2010). "Black Women Walking Zimbabwe: Refuge and Prospect in the Landscapes of Yvonne Vera's The Stone Virgins and Tsitsi Dangarembga's Nervous Conditions and Its Sequel, The Book of Not". Research in African Literatures. 41 (3): 88–111. doi:10.2979/ral.2010.41.3.88. JSTOR 10.2979/ral.2010.41.3.88. S2CID 154648515.
- Mabura, Lily G. N. (2012-08-26). "Teaching Leila Aboulela in the context of other authors across cultures: creative writing, the Third Culture Kid phenomenon and Africana womanism". Learning and Teaching in Higher Education: Gulf Perspectives. 9 (2): 79–92. doi:10.18538/lthe.v9.n2.97. ISSN 2077-5504.
- Mabura, Lily; Husni, Ronak (2019-04-01). "Polemics of Love and the Family in A New Day in Old Sana'a". Meridians. 18 (1): 161–182. doi:10.1215/15366936-7297191. ISSN 1547-8424. S2CID 187481256.

=== Books ===
- Mabura, Lily (1999). Ali, the Little Suntan. Focus Publications. ISBN 9789966882349.
- Mabura, Lily (2000). The Pretoria Conspiracy. Focus Books. ISBN 9789966882462.
- Mabura, Lily; Wamiru, Celestine M (2002). Seth the silly gorilla. Nairobi: Phoenix Publishers. ISBN 978-9966470362. OCLC 55732624.
- Mabura, Lily (2005). Saleh Kanta and the Cavaliers. Phoenix Publishers. ISBN 9789966470195.
- Mabura, Lily (2012). How Shall We Kill the Bishop and Other Stories. Pearson Education/Heinemann. ISBN 9780435075415.
- Mabura, Lily; Mugubi, John (2017). The Warm Heart of Africa and Other Stories. Longhorn Publishers (Kenya) Limited. ISBN 9789966315748.
- Mabura, Lily (2018). remembrance. Longhorn Publishers (Kenya) Limited. ISBN 9789966315717.
