= Moto (magazine) =

Zimbabwean Catholic community newspaper

- Editor: Paul Chidyausiku
- Categories: Political Magazine
- Frequency: Infrequently
- Founded: 1980
- Company: Private
- Country: Zimbabwe
- Language: English, Shona

Moto, established in 1959 in Gweru, Zimbabwe's Midlands town, originated as a weekly community newspaper founded by the Catholic Church. Over time, it transitioned into Moto Fast, gaining prominence during the liberation war by openly criticizing the colonial government and supporting African nationalist parties. The publication faced suppression by the Smith regime in 1974 but re-emerged in 1980, evolving from a newspaper to one of the early magazines providing content in ChiShona, SiNdebele, and English languages.

Following Zimbabwe's Unilateral Declaration of Independence, Moto encountered challenges in aligning its stance from an activist role to an independent, critical voice during the majority government. It aimed to amplify voices often overlooked by the state-controlled media, emphasizing socioeconomic issues and human-interest stories from rural regions.

Striving to balance its church origins with outspoken political viewpoints, Moto regularly covered the emergence of African clergy, highlighting the elevation of Africans within the church hierarchy. Despite economic difficulties and opposition from the Mugabe government, which attempted to shut down the publication multiple times, Moto's readership expanded, attracting intellectuals, professionals, students, and rural audiences.

== Notes ==
This text is taken from https://web.archive.org/web/20080810200524/http://www.chimurengalibrary.co.za/periodicals.php?id=5
