= Civil Lines (magazine) =

Indian literary magazine

- Civil Lines: new writings from India
- Editor: Ravi Dayal
- Categories: Socio-political Magazine
- Frequency: infrequent
- Founded: 1994
- Company: Private
- Country: India
- Language: English

Civil Lines was an Indian literary magazine launched in 1994 by publisher Ravi Dayal. The magazine published five issues between 1994 and 2001. It was published in English and focused on fiction, personal history, reportage and journalism.

== Inception ==
Ravi Dayal worked at Oxford University Press between 1971 and 1987, first as an editor and later as chief executive of its Delhi office. After leaving Oxford University Press, he established Ravi Dayal Publishers. In 1994, he launched Civil Lines as an English-language literary magazine.

== Periodicity ==
Civil Lines did not follow a regular publication schedule. Its issues were published at irregular intervals, with the first issue appearing in 1994 and subsequent issues appearing in 1995, 1997 and 2001. Two issues were published in 2001, bringing the total number of issues to five. Contemporary reviews described the magazine as having an irregular publication schedule.

== Editorial focus ==
The magazine was influenced by the British literary magazine Granta,It published fiction, personal histories, reportage and journalism, with a focus on writing about India. The magazine was aimed at English-speaking readers in urban India.

The five issues of Civil lines were edited by Rukun Advani (two issues), Ivan Hutnik, Mukul Kesavan and Kai Friese. Advani edited two issues, while Hutnik, Kesavan and Friese each edited one. The magazine was edited by practising writers rather than academics and did not have a formal literary manifesto determining its content.

== Termination ==
Five issues of Civil Lines were published between 1994 and 2001. Ravi Dayal died on 4 June 2006. No further issues were published after the fifth issue in 2001. In 2009, Rukun Advani edited Written For Ever: The Best of Civil Lines, an anthology of writings previously published in the magazine. The book was published by Penguin Viking in New Delhi and was dedicated to Ravi Dayal and Dharma Kumar.
