= Tsotso (magazine) =

Tsotso Magazine
- Editor: T.O. Mcloughlin, F.R. Mhonyera, M.Mahiri
- Categories: Political Magazine
- Founded: 1989
- Final issue: 2001
- Country: Zimbabwe
- Language: English Shona

Described as "a magazine of new writing in Zimbabwe", Tsotso (1989–2001) was published with a mandate to undermine the continued colonial domination of literature. It sought to create a platform where a new generation of Zimbabwean writers could give expression to their experiences through writing and create new contexts for the discussion, criticism and dissemination of their work.

== History ==
Tsotso emerged from an initiative in 1989, when Baobab Books held a workshop for young and beginner at Ranche House College in Harare. The magazine bypassed traditional channels such as academics and foreign institutes, Tsotso′s editorial team - T. O. Mcloughlin, F. R. Mhonyera, M. Mahiri, S. Nondo and H. Lewis - put out a call for submissions in popular mass media publications such as Parade and The Herald in 1990. The result was a flood of submissions, many by first-time writers with little or no experience. "This is encouraging," read the editorial response in the second issue of Tsotso, "but a note of caution or at least advice is necessary to the young writer." This statement set the tone for what would become the magazine's strong pedagogic praxis.

Publishing poetry and prose in English and Shona but also in Ndebele, Tonga and Shangaan, Tsotso sought to rupture the separatist conceptions of black and white writing, oral and print poetry, Western academic and traditional forms that continued to dominate post-independence Zimbabwean literature. A culture of critical reading was advanced through regular reviews and analyses of contemporary and historical Zimbabwean writing, and editorial content was focused on encouraging writers to craft alternative kinds of expression that went beyond surface meaning, dominant myths and traditional clichés. The magazine also actively engaged new writers through regular workshops and writing competitions, the results of which often became the focus of the content.

Tsotso published irregularly throughout the 1990s. Its mandate was continued in the new millennium by organisations such as the BWAZ (Budding Writers Association of Zimbabwe), which was founded out of a workshop organized by Tsotso and literary anthologies such as amaBooks' Short Writings From Bulawayo and Weaver Press's Writing Still and Writing Now.
