= Wietie =

- Editor: Christopher van Wyk, Fhazel Johennesse
- Categories: Literary and political Magazine
- Founded: 1980
- Final issue: February 1980
- Country: South Africa
- Language: English

Wietie was first published in 1980 by Christopher van Wyk and Fhazel Johennesse. The magazine provided a literary platform for the prevailing philosophy of Black Consciousness. It gave voice to a new generation of South African writers who saw their work not only as a critique on oppressive systems, but – like Black Power – as a weapon of transformation.

== Content and themes ==
Wietie contained short stories, poems and artwork. The magazine employed a language that was both literary and defiant. Openly declaring its commitment to the 'communication of revolutionary writing,' while also providing a space to explore the realities of everyday life under apartheid, it published fiction, poetry and prose that challenged both the political, cultural and racial status. Combining wit and humour with openly political writing, Wietie did not survive long under the Apartheid administration.

== Publishing ==
After the first issue was picked up by the police in February 1980, the censors banned it, first on the grounds of obscenity (specifically, they objected to the use of the word 'fuck' in the short story 'Aunt Molly and the Girls'), then on the grounds of sedition. After Wietie was forced to close down, Christopher van Wyk returned to Staffrider to become chief editor.
