= Yvonne Adhiambo Owuor =

Kenyan writer (born 1968)

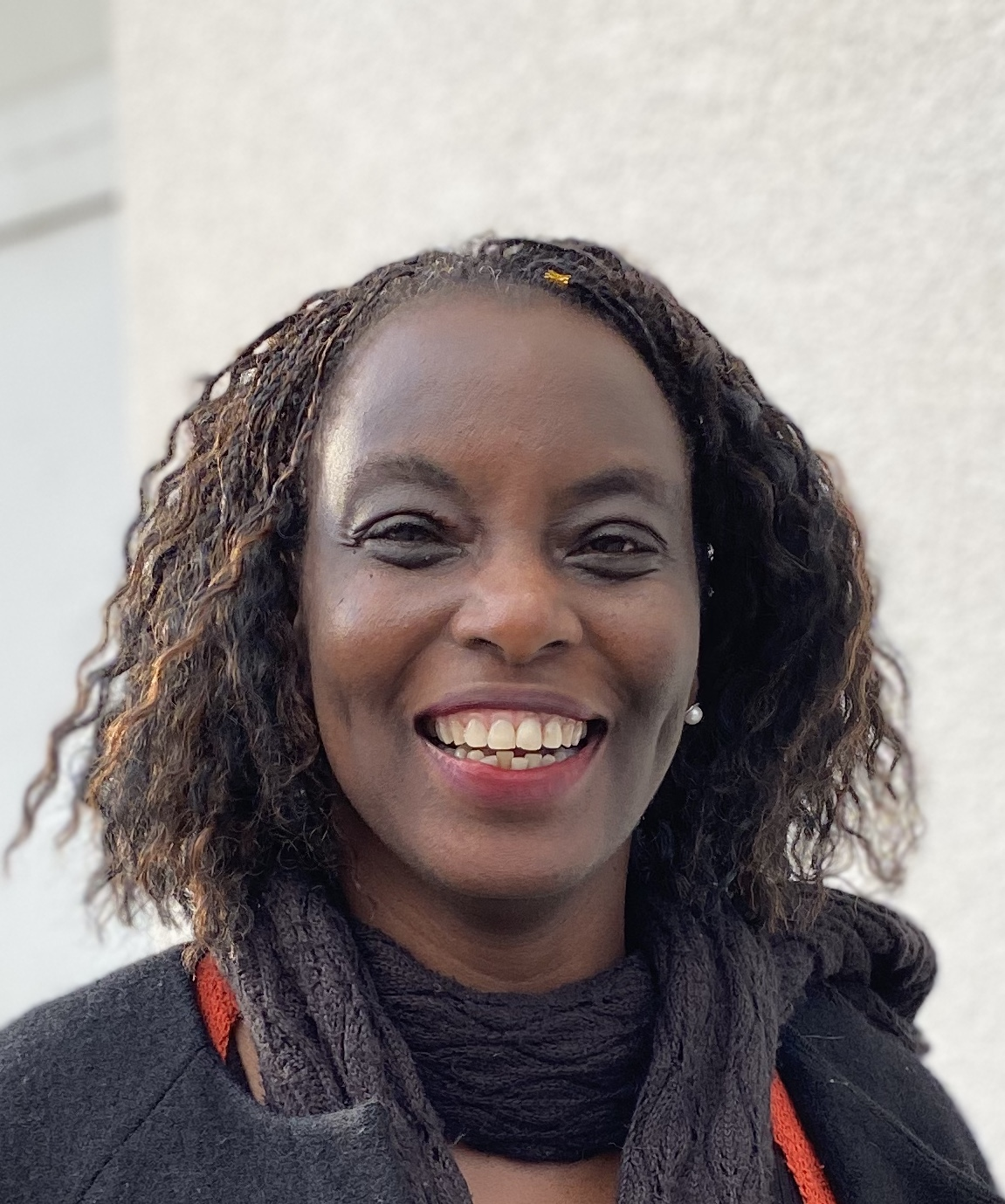
- Born: 1968 (age 57–58); Nairobi, Kenya
- Education: Kenyatta University; Reading University; University of Queensland
- Occupation: Writer
- Writing career
- Genre: Literary fiction
- Notable awards: Caine Prize for African Writing (2003)

Yvonne Adhiambo Owuor (born 1968) is a Kenyan writer who is the author of novels, short stories and essays. She won the 2003 Caine Prize for African Writing for her story "Weight of Whispers". Yvonne is also the co-founder of The Macondo Literary Festival, a non-profit organization that seeks to organize regular literary festivals that promote literature and authors of Africa and from the Global.

== Education and professional life ==
Born in Nairobi, Kenya, Owuor studied English at Kenyatta University, before taking an MA in TV/Video development at Reading University. She obtained an MPhil in Creative Writing from the University of Queensland, Australia.

Owuor has worked as a screenwriter and from 2003 to 2005 was the executive director of the Zanzibar International Film Festival. Her writing has appeared in numerous publications worldwide, including Kwani? and McSweeney's, and her story "The Knife Grinder’s Tale" was made into a short film of the same title, released in 2007. In 2010, along with Binyavanga Wainaina, Owuor participated in the Chinua Achebe Center's "Pilgrimages" project and travelled to Kinshasa, and intends to produce a book about her experiences. She is a contributor to the 2019 anthology New Daughters of Africa, edited by Margaret Busby.

== Writings ==
=== Dust ===
Owuor's 2014 novel Dust portrays the violent history of Kenya in the second half of the 20th century. Reviewing Dust in The New York Times, Taiye Selasi wrote: "In this dazzling novel you will find the entirety of human experience — tearshed, bloodshed, lust, love — in staggering proportions." Ron Charles of The Washington Post wrote: "Owuor demonstrates extraordinary talent and range in these pages. Her style is alternately impressionistic and harsh, incantatory and propulsive. One moment, she keeps us trapped within the bloodied walls of a torture cell; in the next, her poetic voice soars over sun-baked plains. She can clear the gloom with passages of Dickensian comedy or tender romance, but most of her novel takes places in 'haunted silences.' 'Dust' moves between the lamentation of a single family and the corruption of national politics, swirling around one young man’s death to create a vortex of grief that draws in generations of deceit and Kenya’s tumultuous modern history."

=== The Dragonfly Sea ===
In 2019, her second novel, The Dragonfly Sea was published. The Dragonfly Sea is set on Pate Island, off the coast of Kenya, and about a girl named Ayaana living with her mother, Munira. When a sailor named Muhidin enters their lives, Ayaana finds something she has never had before: a father. But as Ayaana grows into adulthood, forces of nature and history begin to reshape her life and the island itself–from a taciturn visitor with a murky past to a sanctuary-seeking religious extremist, from dragonflies to a tsunami, from black-clad kidnappers to cultural emissaries from China. Ayaana ends up embarking on a dramatic ship's journey to the Far East, where she discovers friends and enemies; seduced by the charming but unreliable scion of a powerful Turkish business family; reclaims her devotion to the sea; and comes to find her own tenuous place amid a landscape of beauty and violence and surprising joy.

== Awards and recognition ==
Owuor won the 2003 Caine Prize for African Writing for her story "Weight of Whispers", which considers an aristocratic Rwandan refugee in Kenya. The story was originally published in Kwani?, the Kenyan literary magazine set up by Binyavanga Wainaina after he won the Caine Prize the previous year.

In 2004, she won the Woman of the year (Arts, Heritage category) for her contributions to the arts in Kenya. In September 2015, her critically acclaimed book Dust was shortlisted for the Folio Prize, and won Kenya's pre-eminent literary prize, the Jomo Kenyatta Prize for Literature.

== Selected works ==
=== Novels ===
- Weight of Whispers (Kwani Trust, 2003)
- Dust (Knopf, Granta, 2014)
  - Der Ort, an dem die Reise endet (tr. Simone Jakob) (Dumont, 2016)
  - La Maison au bout des voyages (tr. Françoise Pertat ) (Actes Sud, 2017)
- The Dragonfly Sea (Knopf, 2019)
  - Das Meer der Libellen (Dumont, 2020)

=== Short stories (in anthologies) ===
- "Trial of Terremoto" (Caine Prize Anthology), 2004
- "The State of Tides" (commissioned by Essex County Council, UK), 2004
- "Dressing the Dirge" (Little Black Book anthology), 2005
- "The Knife Grinders' Tale", 2005
- "These Fragments" (All the good things around us; New Daughters of Africa anthology), 2016, 2019
- "The Fire in Ten" (Hearth: A Global Conversation on Identity, Community, and Place), 2016

=== Essays, articles, keynotes, literary reportage ===
- "Kin la Belle: In the Clear Light of Song and Silence", in African Cities Reader II: Mobilities and Fixtures
- "Imagined Waters", Chimurenga Chronic, 2015
- "In Search of Poem-Maps of the Swahili Seas: Three Sea Poems by Haji Gora Haji", Eastern African Literary and Cultural Studies, 4:3–4, 164–178, DOI: 10.1080/23277408.2018.1478632
- "O-Swahili – language and liminality" (2015), Matatu 46(1):141–152 ·DOI: 10.1163/9789004298071_009
- "Reading Our ruins; A Rough Sketch" (2018), Matatu 50(1): 13–4, DOI: https://doi.org/10.1163/18757421-05001012
- "Distilling Existence" (2019), Granta 146: The Politics of Feeling
- "The Spiritual Voice of The Forest" (2021), National Geographic, 240(6):98–105
