= Molotov Cocktail (magazine) =

South African magazine

- Editor: James Sanders, Ronald Suresh Roberts, Adam Rumball
- Categories: Cultural-Political Magazine
- Frequency: quarterly
- Founded: 2007
- Company: Private
- Country: South Africa
- Language: English

Molotov Cocktail is a quarterly magazine published in South Africa. Molotov Cocktail is edited by James Sanders (initially with the help of Ronald Suresh Roberts, and later alone).

== Content and themes ==
Molotov Cocktail defines itself as "a platform where South African intellectuals will debate issues and engage in serious discussions about the direction that our country should take." It has featured archival documents including long-lost SACP biographies and back issues of the SADF's Paratus; new writing on cultural schizophrenia, oil, opposition, Zimbabwe, 'apartheid' in Israel, meeting a Nazi in SA, polo in Plett, Post-Polokwane: the new African National Congress (ANC), banking, crime, and succession.

It also includes news, controversial profiles, satire, political gossip, book and film reviews, detailed media analysis, and some literary critique. Graphics often take the form of illustrations, posters, political cartoons, power organograms and "how to" guides, including "How to make a Molotov Cocktail".

The magazine silenced critics who saw it as Pro-Thabo Mbeki mouthpiece by maintaining its editorial stance despite Mbeki's electoral defeat at the ANC conference in 2007.
