= Fiammetta Rocco =

British journalist and author

Fiammetta Rocco Hon. FRSL
- Born: Kenya
- Education: University of Oxford
- Occupations: Journalist and author
- Notable credit: The Economist

Fiammetta Rocco, Hon. FRSL, is a British journalist and author. She is a Senior Editor at The Economist.

== Biography ==
Rocco was born to a Franco-Italian family and grew up in Kenya. She went on to study Arabic at the University of Oxford.

Rocco is the Administrator of the International Booker Prize and she is on the board of directors for the Edinburgh International Book Festival.

She was the Culture Editor at The Economist between 2003 and 2018.

In 2003, she published a book called The Miraculous Fever-Tree: Malaria and the Quest for a Cure That Changed the World about the discovery of quinine, which was the BBC Radio 4 Book of the Week.

In 2021, Rocco was made an Honorary Fellow of the Royal Society of Literature.
