= Caine Prize =

Annual award for best original short story by an African writer

The Caine Prize for African Writing
- Awarded for: Best short story by an African writer in the English language
- First award: 2000; 26 years ago
- Website: www.caineprize.com

The Caine Prize for African Writing is an annual literary award for the best short story by an African writer, whether in Africa or elsewhere, published in the English language. Founded in the United Kingdom in 2000, the £10,000 prize was named in memory of businessman and philanthropist Sir Michael Harris Caine, former chairman of Booker Group and of the Booker Prize management committee. The Caine Prize is sometimes referred to as the "African Booker". The Chair of the Board is Ellah Wakatama, appointed in 2019.

Between 2020 and 2022 it was styled as the AKO Caine Prize for African Writing due to a three-year grant from Nicolai Tangen's AKO Foundation.

== History and background ==
The Caine Prize is a registered charity with the aim of bringing African writing to a wider audience through an annual literary award. It is named after businessman and philanthropist Sir Michael Caine (1927–1999), former Chairman of Booker plc, who also chaired the "Africa95" arts festival and the Booker Prize management committee for almost 25 years. After his death, friends and colleagues established the prize to be awarded annually in his memory.

The prize was first awarded in 2000, to the Sudanese writer Leila Aboulela for her short story "The Museum", at the Zimbabwe International Book Fair in Harare. In its first year the Caine Prize attracted entries from 20 African countries.

Judges represent a variety of literary fields and include notable authors, artists, journalists, broadcasters and academics with a connection to literature in Africa.

Historically, the winner was announced at a dinner in July, at an event formerly held in Oxford but more recently at SOAS, University of London, to which the shortlisted candidates were all invited. This formed part of a week of activities for the candidates, including readings, book signings and press opportunities.

In 2024, the Caine Prize declared that it would "re-centre" itself on the African continent, with a planned year-long celebration of the prize’'s 25th anniversary in 2025. Proposed events include readings and discussions involving the shortlisted writers and past winners, and tributes to writers such as the late Charles Mungoshi (Zimbabwe), who was shortlisted in 2000, and the late Binyavanga Wainaina (Kenya), who won the award in 2002.

The Caine Prize also arranges writers' workshops that are held in a different African country each year.

== 25th anniversary and the Best of Caine Award ==
The year 2025 marked the Caine Prize's 25th anniversary. In 2024, the Caine Prize declared that it would "re-centre" itself on the African continent, with a planned year-long celebration. Proposed events included readings and discussions involving the shortlisted writers and past winners, and tributes to writers such as the late Charles Mungoshi, who was shortlisted in 2000, and the late Binyavanga Wainaina, who won the award in 2002.

To commemorate the anniversary, the prize also established the Best of Caine award, an honorary prize recognizing the best short story from all previous Caine Prize winners across the last 25 years. The judging panel for the honorary award was chaired by Nobel laureate Abdulrazak Gurnah, and included novelist and short story writer Jennifer Nansubuga Makumbi and film producer Tony Tagoe.

Zimbabwean writer NoViolet Bulawayo was chosen as the winner of the Best of Caine award, announced on 27 September 2025 at the inaugural Words Across Waters: Afro Lit Fest at the British Library in London. Bulawayo won the prize for her story "Hitting Budapest", which originally won the Caine Prize in 2011. The story, which follows a group of children sneaking into an affluent neighbourhood to steal fruit, was praised by the judges for its "powerful language, distinctive tone of voice, and bold, compelling storytelling."

Bulawayo described the achievement as a "defining highlight" that affirmed her literary path and strengthened her commitment to writing.

== Supporters ==
Among supporters of the prize over the years have included friends of Sir Michael Caine in the UK, United States and Africa, the Oppenheimer Memorial Trust, the Zochonis Foundation, the Marit & Hans Rausing Foundation, the Gatsby Charitable Foundation, the Headley Trust, the Esmee Fairbairn Charitable Trust, the David Alliance Family Foundation, the Cairns Charitable Trust, the Botwinick-Wolfensohn Family Foundation, the Sunrise Foundation, the Von Clemm Charitable Trust, the Royal Over-Seas League, Sarova Hotels, Bata Shoes (Kenya) Ltd and (Zimbabwe) Ltd and Kenya Airways.

The five African winners of the Nobel Prize for Literature have supported the Caine Prize as patrons: Wole Soyinka, Nadine Gordimer, Naguib Mahfouz, J. M. Coetzee and Abdulrazak Gurnah. Sir Michael's widow, Baroness Nicholson of Winterbourne, was founding president of the council and Jonathan Taylor was the first Chair, with Nick Elam the first administrator.

== Critical reception ==
In 2011, Nigerian-American writer and critic Ikhide Ikheloa criticized the Caine Prize: "The creation of a prize for 'African writing' may have created the unintended effect of breeding writers willing to stereotype Africa for glory. The mostly lazy, predictable stories that made the 2011 shortlist celebrate orthodoxy and mediocrity. … The problem now is that many writers are skewing their written perspectives to fit what they imagine will sell to the West and the judges of the Caine Prize."

In 2019, a story was removed from the shortlist after "an allegation" led to admission of "the author's failure to attribute a core source", i.e. Laleh Khadivi's 2014 story.

In an Atlantic article, Vauhini Vara suggested that 2026 prize winner Simbarashe Steyn Kundizeza had written his story "The Blue Fighter" using artificial intelligence, due to the "proliferation of language that is common in AI-produced writing". She said that almost the entire story had been flagged as AI-generated by the detector software Pangram. Kundizeza denied the allegations and the Caine Prize said that it had initiated an investigation in response to Vara's article. A spokesperson said that the prize had initiated an investigation in response to Vara's article. One month later, the Caine Prize Board of Trustees released a statement claiming that an internal investigation had fully exonerated Kundizeza. Chairwoman Ellah Wakatama stated the evidence was clear and that "The Blue Fighter" had been written by a human, and that Kundizeza therefore remained the rightful winner. Max Spero, the CEO of Pangram Labs, accused this statement by the Caine Prize of itself being AI-generated.

== List of winners ==
Year	Author	Country	Work	Source(s)
2000	Leila Aboulela	Sudan	"The Museum"	
2001	Helon Habila	Nigeria	"Love Poems"	
2002	Binyavanga Wainaina	Kenya	"Discovering Home"	
2003	Yvonne Adhiambo Owuor	Kenya	"Weight of Whispers"	
2004	Brian Chikwava	Zimbabwe	"Seventh Street Alchemy"	
2005	S. A. Afolabi	Nigeria	"Monday Morning"	
2006	Mary Watson	South Africa	"Jungfrau"	
2007	Monica Arac de Nyeko	Uganda	"Jambula Tree"	
2008	Henrietta Rose-Innes	South Africa	"Poison"	
2009	E. C. Osondu	Nigeria	"Waiting"	
2010	Olufemi Terry	Sierra Leone	"Stickfighting Days"	
2011	NoViolet Bulawayo	Zimbabwe	"Hitting Budapest"	
2012	Rotimi Babatunde	Nigeria	"Bombay's Republic"	
2013	Tope Folarin	Nigeria	"Miracle"	
2014	Okwiri Oduor	Kenya	"My Father's Head"	
2015	Namwali Serpell	Zambia	"The Sack"	
2016	Lidudumalingani Mqombothi	South Africa	"Memories We Lost"	
2017	Bushra al-Fadil	Sudan	"The Story of the Girl Whose Birds Flew Away"	
2018	Makena Onjerika	Kenya	"Fanta Blackcurrant"	
2019	Lesley Nneka Arimah	Nigeria	"Skinned"	
2020	Irenosen Okojie	Nigeria	"Grace Jones"	
2021	Meron Hadero	Ethiopia	"The Street Sweep"	
2022	Idza Luhumyo	Kenya	"Five Years Next Sunday"	
2023	Mame Bougouma Diene and Woppa Diallo	Senegal	"A Soul of Small Places"	
2024	Nadia Davids	South Africa	"Bridling"	
2025 --Caine Special Edition	NoViolet Bulawayo	Zimbabwe	"Hitting Budapest"	
2026	Simbarashe Steyn Kundizeza	Zimbabwe	"The Blue Fighter"	
