= L'Autre Afrique =

- Editor: Jean-Baptiste Placca
- Categories: News Magazine
- Frequency: Monthly; Weekly
- Founded: 1997
- First issue: May 1997
- Final issue: September 2002
- Company: Private
- Country: France
- Based in: Paris
- Language: English, French

L'Autre Afrique was a monthly news magazine in Paris, France, published between 1992 and 2002. There was a period in between when the magazine was not produced or published.

== History and profile ==
L'Autre Afrique was founded in 1997 by Paris-based journalist Jean-Baptiste Placca as a response to the "clichéd and often reductive" depiction of Africa in the Western media. In contrast, L'Autre Afrique sought to inspire a different reading that reflected the diversity of opinion, realities, terminology, and complexities of daily life across a vast continent of more than 50 nations. It was headquartered in Paris. The first issue appeared in May 1997.

L'Autre Afrique was thus characterized by its investigative journalism, coverage, and fieldwork reportages. Placca also saw the newspaper as a pedagogical tool and called for African journalists to contribute to growth of Africa.

L'Autre Afrique was distributed both in Europe and Africa to take advantage of the mobility that the French communication and transport infrastructure provided to develop a global network of journalists, analysts and photographers. This network proved difficult to sustain as financial pressures forced L'Autre Afrique to close after only three years. In 2001, Placca resurrected it with a clearer financial structure. The first issue was published on 1 July 2001. In September 2001, the magazine was published weekly. Despite this and the distribution systems, this attempt also failed. L'Autre Afrique ceased publication in September 2002.
