= Akin Adesokan =

Nigerian writer

Akin Adéṣọ̀kàn
- Born: Akin Adesokan; Nigeria
- Education: Cornell University; University of Ibadan
- Occupations: Writer, professor

Akin Adesokan is a Nigerian writer, scholar and novelist with research interests in twentieth and twenty-first century African and African American/African Diaspora literature and cultures. He is currently the associate professor of comparative literature at Indiana University Bloomington. He exerts influence on Nigerian cultural environment through commentary, advocacy, and writing.

== Education ==
Adesokan has a Ph.D. from Cornell University in 2005, an MA from the same university in 2003, and a bachelor's degree from the University of Ibadan (1990) where he emerged the best student in the Theatre Arts department. He also won the Faculty of Arts prize as well as the National Council of Arts and Culture Prize.

== Arrest ==
On November 7, 1997, while returning to Nigeria from a fellowship in Austria, Adesokan was arrested by security agents of the Sani Abacha administration and held incommunicado at one of the country's notorious detention centers, along with his friend and fellow writer, Ogaga Ifowodo.

== Writing and publications ==
His first novel is titled Roots in the Sky (2004), which won the Association of Nigerian Authors' Prize for Fiction in manuscript form back in 1996. He has won the PEN Freedom-to-Write Award (1998), and the Lillian Hellman-Dashiell Hammett Human Rights Award (1999).

Of his work, he says "My writing is an attempt to bear an honest witness to my time, to the experience I have as a human being, as a Nigerian, as an African. The African experience – slavery, wars, colonialism, diseases, neo-colonialism. There are other dimensions of experiences that are perennial, that aren't easy to grasp historically or as past events, and one tries to respond to these."

In 2001, he published Postcolonial Artists and Global Aesthetics (Bloomington & Indianapolis: Indiana University Press).

Other works include Celebrating D. O. Fagunwa: Aspects of African and World Literary History, co-edited with Adeleke Adeeko (Ibadan: Bookcraft, 2017, 314pp) and Knocking Tommy's Hustle (2010), a fictional piece.

He has also written columns on politics and culture for Premium Times, Chimurenga, and many others.

== Professional associations ==
Adesokan belongs to the:

- African Literature Association
- African Studies Association
- Association of Nigerian Authors
- Modern Language Association
- Society for Cinema and Media Studies
