= Binyavanga Wainaina =

Kenyan writer and editor (1971–2019)

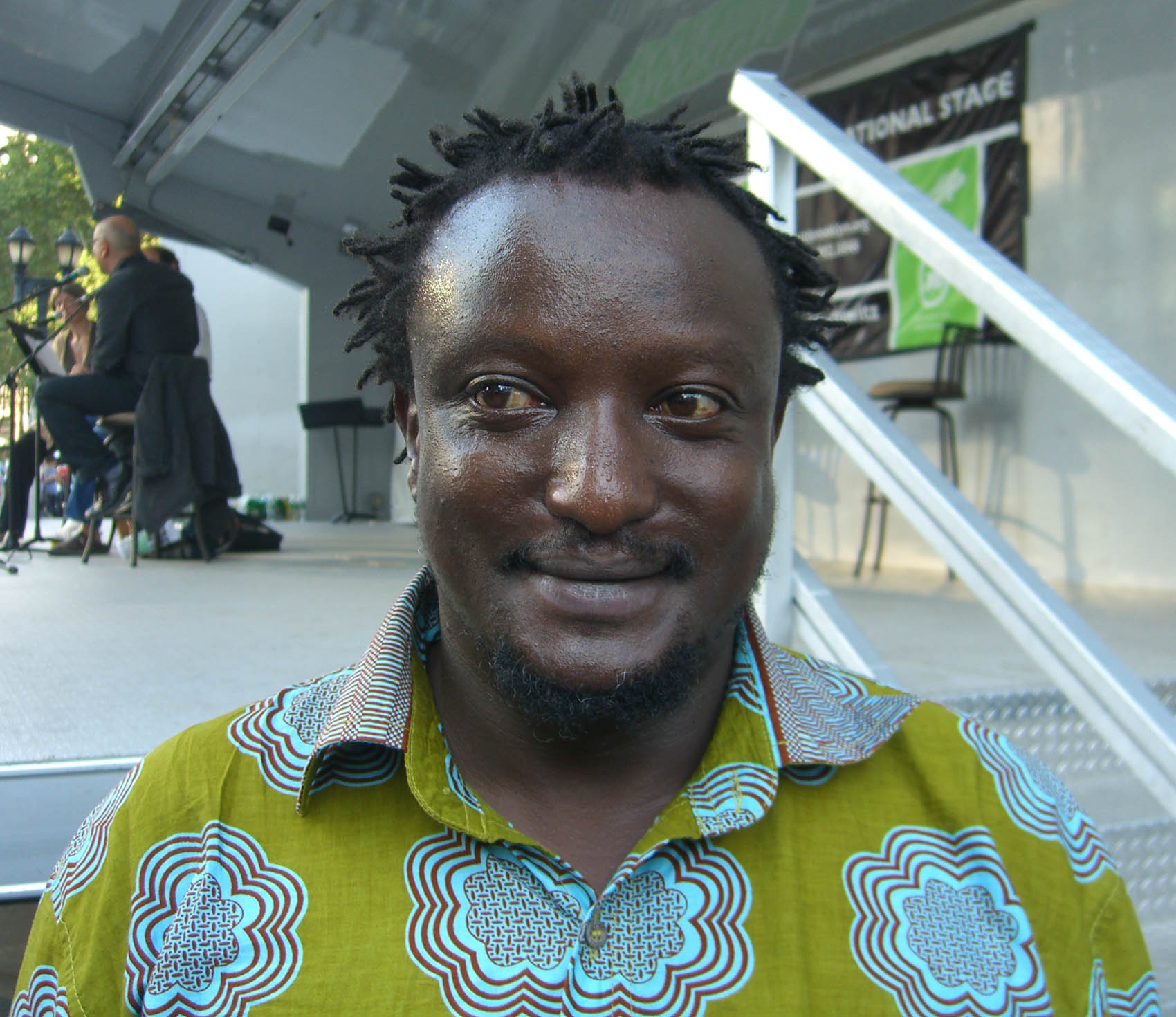
- Wainaina at the 2009 Brooklyn Book Festival.
- Born: Kenneth Wainaina; 18 January 1971; Nakuru, Kenya
- Died: 21 May 2019 (aged 48); Nairobi, Kenya
- Education: Moi Primary School; Mangu High School; Lenana School; University of Transkei; University of East Anglia
- Occupations: Memoirist, short-story writer, editor
- Known for: Founding editor of literary magazine Kwani?
- Notable work: "How to Write About Africa" (2005); One Day I Will Write About This Place: A Memoir (2011)
- Awards: 2002 Caine Prize

Kenneth Binyavanga Wainaina (18 January 1971 – 21 May 2019) was a Kenyan author, journalist and 2002 winner of the Caine Prize for African Writing. In 2003, he became the founding editor of Kwani? literary magazine, launched in Kenya, East Africa. In April 2014, Time magazine included Wainaina in its annual Time 100 as one of the "Most Influential People in the World".

== Early life and education ==
Binyavanga Wainaina was born on 18 January 1971 in Nakuru in Rift Valley Province, Kenya. He attended Moi Primary School in Nakuru, Mangu High School in Thika, and Lenana School in Nairobi. He later studied commerce at the University of Transkei in South Africa, where he went to live in 1991.

== Literary career ==
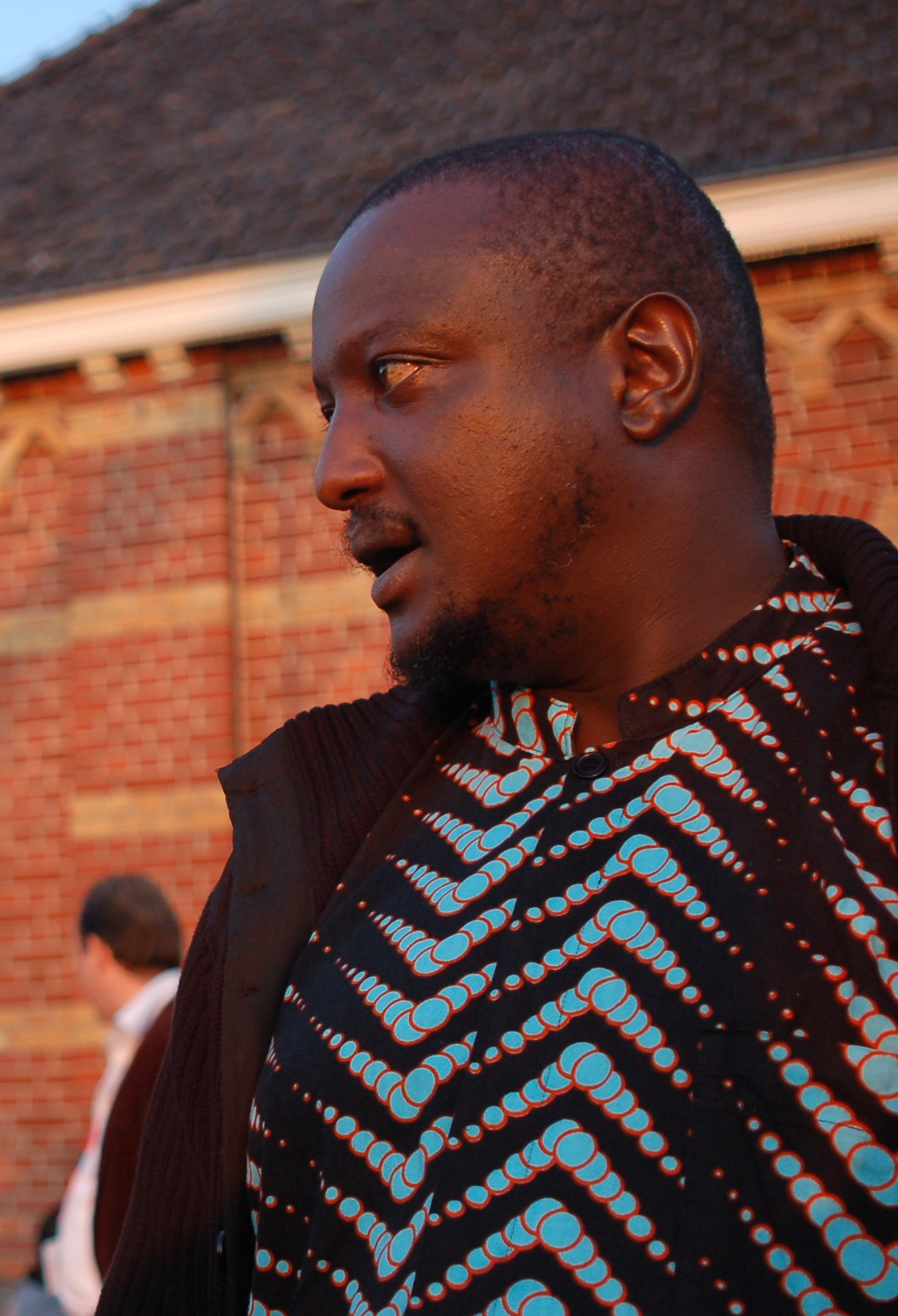
Wainaina at the PICNIC festival in 2008, where he was a featured speaker.

Following his education, Wainaina worked in Cape Town for some years as a freelance food and travel writer.

In July 2002, he won the Caine Prize for his short story "Discovering Home" (the judges being Ahdaf Soueif, Margaret Busby, Jason Cowley and Abdulrazak Gurnah). Wainaina was the founding editor of Kwani?, a literary magazine created in Kenya for emerging writers, driven by an artistic revolution that started in 2002. Established in 2003, Kwani? has since become an important source of new writing from Africa; Yvonne Owuor, winner of the 2003 Caine Prize, also wrote for the magazine.

Wainaina's satirical essay "How to Write About Africa", published in Granta magazine in 2005, attracted wide attention. Wainaina summed up the way Western media has reinforced stereotypes and pre-existing ideas of Africa by saying their representation was that: "One must treat Africa as if it were one country... [of] 900 million people who are too busy starving and dying and warring and emigrating to read your book." The essay came to have lasting influence, described by The Guardian as "the most read English-language text on the African continent", and in 2010, Wainaina would be prompted to pen "How to Write About Africa II: The Revenge".

In 2003, he was given an award by the Kenya Publishers Association for his services to Kenyan literature. He wrote for The EastAfrican, National Geographic, The Sunday Times (South Africa), Granta, The New York Times, Chimurenga and The Guardian (UK).

In 2007, Wainaina was a writer-in-residence at Union College in Schenectady, NY (USA). In the fall of 2008, he was in residence at Williams College, in Williamstown, Massachusetts, where he was teaching, lecturing and working on a novel. He was a Bard Fellow and the director of the Chinua Achebe Center for African Literature and Languages at Bard College.

Wainaina collected more than 13,000 recipes from around Africa and was an expert on traditional and modern African cuisine.

In January 2007, Wainaina was nominated by the World Economic Forum as a "Young Global Leader" – an award given to people for "their potential to contribute to shaping the future of the world." He subsequently declined the award. In a letter to Klaus Schwab and Queen Rania of Jordan, he wrote:

I assume that most, like me, are tempted to go anyway because we will get to be "validated" and glow with the kind of self-congratulation that can only be bestowed by very globally visible and significant people, and we are also tempted to go and talk to spectacularly bright and accomplished people – our "peers". We will achieve Global Institutional Credibility for our work, as we have been anointed by an institution that many countries and presidents bow down to.
The problem here is that I am a writer. And although, like many, I go to sleep at night fantasizing about fame, fortune and credibility, the thing that is most valuable in my trade is to try, all the time, to keep myself loose, independent and creative ... it would be an act of great fraudulence for me to accept the trite idea that I am "going to significantly impact world affairs".

In 2010, Wainaina completed an MPhil in Creative Writing at the University of East Anglia.

His debut book, a memoir entitled One Day I Will Write About This Place, was published in 2011. In January 2014, in response to a wave of anti-gay laws passed in Africa, Wainaina publicly announced that he was gay, first writing an essay entitled "I Am a Homosexual, Mum", which he described as a "lost chapter" of his 2011 memoir, and then tweeting: "I am, for anybody confused or in doubt, a homosexual. Gay, and quite happy."

== Personal life ==
On 1 December 2016, World AIDS Day, Wainaina announced on his Twitter profile that he was HIV positive, "and happy". In 2018, he announced that he would be marrying his long-term partner the following year.

== Death ==
Wainaina died, aged 48, after a stroke on the evening of 21 May 2019, at Aga Khan Hospital in Nairobi, according to news and family sources. He had experienced several strokes since 2016.

A collection of Wainaina's essays, entitled How to Write About Africa, was posthumously published in 2022.

== Selected publications ==
=== Books ===
- One Day I Will Write About This Place: A Memoir (autobiography); Graywolf Press, 2011, ISBN 978-1555975913.
- How To Write About Africa (collected essays), Penguin Books, 2022; paperback 2024, ISBN 9780241252536

=== Shorter writings ===
- "Discovering Home" (short story), g21net, 2001. Reprinted in Discovering Home: A selection of writings from the 2002 Caine Prize for African Writing. Jacana (South Africa), ISBN 1-919931-55-4. "Discovering Home" Part One; Part Two. G21 Africa.
- "An Affair to Dismember" (short story), Wasafiri, Volume 17, Issue 37, 2002.
- "Beyond the River Yei: Life in the Land Where Sleeping is a Disease" (photographic essay; with Sven Torfinn), Kwani Trust, 2004.
- "How To Write About Africa" (article, satire), Granta 92, 2005. As How to Write About Africa, Kwani Trust, 2008, ISBN 978-9966700827. Reproduced in full in the 40th birthday edition of Granta, 2 May 2019.
- "In Gikuyu, for Gikuyu, of Gikuyu" (article, satire), Granta 103, 2008.
- "How to Write About Africa II: The Revenge", Bidoun, No. 21, Bazaar II, 2010.
- "Viewpoint: Binyavanga on why Africa's international image is unfair", BBC News | Africa, 24 April 2012.
- "I am a homosexual, mum" (essay). Africa is a Country, 19 January 2014. Reprinted in The Guardian, 21 January 2014.
- "A Letter to All Kenyans from Binyavanga Wainaina or Binyavanga wa Muigai" (essay), Brittle Paper, 25 October 2017.

== Awards and honours ==
- 2002: Caine Prize for African Writing for his short story "Discovering Home".
- 2004: Kenyan Publishers Association Award.
- 2014: Time Magazine's "100 Most Influential People.

== See also ==
- LGBT rights in Kenya
