= Enkare Review =

Nairobi-baswd literary magazine

- Issue I cover, April 2017
- Categories: Fiction, poetry, interviews, essays, photography
- First issue: April 2017; 8 years ago
- Country: Kenya
- Based in: Nairobi (since 2016)
- Language: English
- Website: www.enkare.org

Enkare Review is a Nairobi-based literary magazine established in August 2016, after initial conversations between Alexis Teyie, Troy Onyango, and Carey Baraka. In its short period of existence, it has published Taiye Selasi, Junot Díaz, Maaza Mengiste, Zukiswa Wanner, Namwali Serpell, Richard Ali, Lidudumalingani, Jericho Brown, Harriet Anena, Beverley Nambozo, Leila Aboulela, Nnedi Okorafor, Stanley Onjezani Kenani, Tendai Huchu, Kọ́lá Túbọ̀sún among others, and interviews with prolific African writer Chuma Nwokolo; and The New Yorker's editor, David Remnick.

The magazine publishes fiction, poetry, non-fiction and visual arts from all parts of the globe – with submissions coming from Nigeria, South Africa, Kenya, India, Latin America and the US, but the primary focus is African literature.

== History ==
The magazine's inaugural editorial provided a snapshot of the circumstances in which Enkare Review was founded:

In July 2016, a bunch of twenty-something-year-olds sat down in a cafe on Koinange Lane in Nairobi and decided to set up a literary magazine. They had no idea of the amount of time, energy and dedication it takes to run a literary magazine. All they knew is that they wanted to create a space that would allow both emerging and established writers to converge and have narratives that converse with one another.

== Recent contributors ==
Some of the recent contributors to the Enkare Review issues include: Romeo Oriogun, Stephen Embleton, Frankline Sunday, Megan Ross, Wanjala Njalale, Wairimũ Mũrĩithi, Farah Ahamed, Derek Lubangakene, Ebuka Chukwudi Peter, Amatesiro Dore, Frances Ogamba, Kechi Nomu, Michelle Angwenyi, Otiato Guguyu, M.V. Sematlane, Sylvie Taussig, Farai Mudzingwa, Mapule Mohulatsi, and Liam Kruger.

== See also ==
List of literary magazines

== See also ==
- Transition Magazine
- Kwani?
- Saraba Magazine
- Agbowo
