= Lolwe =

Online literary magazine

Lolwe (Magazine)
- Issue 1
- Editor: Troy Onyango
- Categories: Literary magazine
- Founded: January 2020
- First issue: June 2020; 5 years ago
- Website: lolwe.org
- ISSN: 2634-7385

Lolwe is an online magazine that publishes fiction, literary criticism, personal essays, photography, and poetry.

== History ==
Lolwe was founded in January 2020 by Kenyan writer and editor Troy Onyango. According to the website the origin of the name is, "Lolwe: From Nam Lolwe, the original or traditional Luo name for Lake Victoria meaning 'endless lake/water body'. Therefore, Lolwe meaning endless, meaning 'having or seeming to have no end or limit'."

The publication made a call out for submissions for its inaugural issue for work that is "bold, different, and blurs or pushes boundaries." In an interview, the founder revealed that the magazine was inspired by literary magazines like Saraba Magazine, Chimurenga, Bakwa, and Kwani?.

This publication accepts submissions by Black authors (African, Caribbean and in the Diaspora).

=== See also ===
- Transition Magazine
- Kwani?
- Saraba Magazine
- Agbowo
