= Agbowó =

African literary journal

- Editor: Adedayo Agarau
- Categories: Literary magazine
- Language: English
- Website: agbowo.org

Logo

Agbowó is an African literary journal publishing poetry, fiction, essays, drama and visual art. The journal has published several works of literary and visual art since its launch in 2017 as well as three issues—X, Limits, Memory—of an annual, themed magazine.

== History ==
Founded by Habeeb Kolade and Dolapo Amusat in 2017, the journal began as an expansion on the UItes WRITE Anthology (2015–2019), a literary anthology seeking to publish prose, poetry and fiction by University of Ibadan students and alumni. The magazine bears the name of the street opposite the University of Ibadan, the alma mater of the founders, symbolizing their move out of the ivory tower but Oredola Ibrahim, a founding editor, offered a different exegesis - "collectors of things of value". The first publication of the new literary magazine was award-winning Nigerian poet, Tade Ipadeola's On Desire. The magazine has since gone on to publish the literary works of both prominent and emerging African writers including Efe Paul Azino, Toni Kan, Jumoke Verrisimo, Romeo Oriogun and Logan February. As at 2020, the magazine, catering exclusively to the African continent and its diaspora have published work from Rwanda, Malawi, Cameroon, Nigeria, Kenya, South Africa, Zambia, Botswana, Mali, Uganda, Ghana, and DR Congo. The journal published its first annual issue in 2018 and published two themed editions; Limits and Memory to numerous plaudits. Initially publishing just poetry, fiction, essays and visual art, the magazine expanded to include one-act plays in 2019.

== Founding editors ==
The founding editorial team consisted Rasaq Malik Gbolahan (editor-in-chief), Moyosore Orimoloye (executive editor, editor-in-chief from 2018), Adekunle Adebajo (non-fiction editor), Boluwatife Olu Afolabi (poetry editor), Darafunmi Olanrewaju (fiction editor), Winifred Binogun (fiction editor), Ibrahim Oredola (reviews and interviews editor) Sheyi Owolabi (photography editor) and Adebola Abimbolu (visual arts editor). While all founding members were University of Ibadan alumni, the institutional affiliations of the editorial team have continued to change, most markedly with Adedayo Agarau's appointment as editor-in-chief on July 22, 2021.

== Arts n Chill ==
In 2019, Agbowó acquired "Arts N' Chill" an events platform catering to creators and art-enthusiasts within the University of Ibadan community by organizing literary workshops, open-mics and discussions around the intersections between art and societal issues. Arts N Chill was founded by Moyosore Orimoloye, Boluwatife Olu Afolabi and Ezim Osai while they were students at the University of Ibadan. In 2019, Arts n Chill was one of the leading projects of the Support And Connect – Nigerian Art And Culture Projects 2019 By The Goethe-institut Nigeria. Arts N Chill has hosted prominent literary writers like Kọ́lá Túbọ̀sún, Dami Ajayi and Tade Ipadeola.

== Published by Agbowó ==
In 2020, Agbowó started its publishing imprint to support creative Africans in publishing their works in other permanent forms like books, anthologies, video and audio books. So far, Published has produced three anthologies. The Fire That Is Dreamed of: The Young African Poets Anthology curated by Ernest O. Ògúnyẹmí, SÉDUCTION du VERRE | Xaron Ire x Agbowó, and In Her Words Anthology, African Women's Perspective on Gender Equality.

== See also ==
- Transition Magazine
- Kwani?
- Saraba Magazine
