= Saraba (magazine) =

Nonprofit literary magazine

Saraba Magazine
- Editor: Emmanuel Iduma
- Categories: Literature, art, culture
- Frequency: Quarterly
- Publisher: Saraba Literary Trust
- First issue: February 2009; 17 years ago
- Country: Nigeria
- Website: sarabamag.com

Saraba is a nonprofit literary magazine published by the Saraba Literary Trust in Nigeria. First published in February 2009, it aims "to create unending voices by publishing the finest emerging writers, with focus on writers from Nigeria, and other parts of Africa". It has become one of the most successful literary magazines in and out of Africa.

== History ==
Saraba was founded in 2008 after a writing workshop organized by Emmanuel Iduma, Ayobami Adebayo and Arthur Anyaduba, in Obafemi Awolowo University, of which Dami Ajayi was the first attendee. Ajayi and Iduma would go on to found Saraba while still students at Obafemi Awolowo University, Ile-Ife.

The first edition, themed Family, was published in February 2009 and was guest-edited by poet Jumoke Verissimo. Saraba magazine editions are published quarterly, mostly as themed issues. Prequel and supplementary editions as well as collective and individual poetry chapbooks have also been published with the first chapbook titled The Economy of Sound including an introduction by Tade Ipadeola.

The magazine's poetry is edited by Adebiyi Olusolape, nonfiction by Arthur Anyaduba and fiction by Ayobami Adebayo and Dami Ajayi, all senior editors. Emmanuel Iduma serves as Editor with Adaudo Anyiam-Osigwe as Managing Editor.

== Publication ==
Saraba Magazine announces a call for submission to a themed forthcoming issue that would be released usually on the next quarter. Saraba has published a number of writers from Nigeria and elsewhere in Africa who have gone on to garner international renown, and notable careers such as Ayobami Adebayo, Adebola Rayo, Uche Peter Umez, Jumoke Verissimo, Bwesigye bwa Mwesigire, Akin Adesokan, Victor Ehikhamenor, Clifton Gachagua, Tade Ipadeola, Okwiri Oduor, Abubakar Adam Ibrahim. Saraba has also published poetry chapbooks by Umar Abubakar Sidi, Tunji Olalere, Kola Tubosun and Jumoke Verissimo as part of their Individual Chapbook Series.

Until 2017, all publications were made as freely downloadable PDF files or articles on the magazine's website. In February 2017, open submissions were suspended, to be reopened by the end of the year. Intentions to publish at least one print issue every year were also announced.

== Collaborations ==
Saraba often collaborates with other literary institutions to produce special editions. In 2011, Saraba published The World Salad, its fifth poetry chapbook, in collaboration with the Poetry Translation Centre. It featured Pakistani, Sudanese, Somali, Argentine, Spanish and Kurdish poetry, in English. The sixth poetry chapbook, The Way of the Nigerian Folk, also featured folksongs from selected Nigerian ethnic groups such as Nupe, Idoma, Kakanda in the original languages and then in English translations. In 2015, a special issue on African literary festivals was produced in collaboration with the Storymoja Festival; it featured essays on selected literary festivals. In 2016, Saraba published another special issue on the 2015 edition of the Etisalat Prize for Literature, which featured interviews with the longlisted authors and two essays on the winning book. In 2017, together with The Goethe-Institute and Bakwa magazine, Saraba created a literary exchange project for writers from Lagos and Yaoundé.

== Prizes ==
Annually, from 2011 to 2013, in collaboration with PEN Nigeria, Saraba awarded the PEN Nigeria/Saraba Poetry Prize to the writer of a winning poem selected from all poems published the preceding year in the magazine or poetry chapbooks.

In August 2015, the Saraba Manuscript Prize was announced. Supported by the Miles Morland Foundation, writers from within Nigeria and elsewhere in the world were invited to submit completed manuscripts in either the fiction or nonfiction category. The prize judges would select five winners from a prior longlist of ten in each category. All shortlisted manuscripts will be published in digital book format and as audiobooks, while partnership deal with a renowned literary publisher within the country would ensure physical book publication. The prize comes with a 100,000 naira advance against royalties.

The 2016 prize for fiction was judged by Rotimi Babatunde, Eghosa Imasuen and Azafi Omoluabi-Ogosi.

=== Winners ===
==== Nonfiction category ====
- House No. 57 by Temitayo Olofinlua & Kola Tubosun
- Life on a Blackboard – Vignettes of a Queer Nigerian by Amatesiro Dore
- Native Tongue by Ola Osaze
- Petal on Thistles by Victor Akwu
- Kenyan Boy by Socrates Mbamalu

==== Fiction category ====
Eboka Chukwudi Peter's Mosaic: Stitches of Stories Lived, Stories Learned and Stories Told was declared the winning manuscript "for his visceral excavations of the subterranean anguish of contemporary life using sinuous, prehensile prose that opens up new aesthetic possibilities in Nigerian fiction.”

The four other shortlisted manuscripts are:

- Hajara Hussaini Ashara's 1994
- Amarachi Priscilla Ekekwe's Beyond the Beautiful Sea
- Ebelechukwu Ijeoma Mogo's IJBG and Other Stories
- TJ Benson's We Won’t Fade into Darkness

== Saraba Literary Trust ==
Saraba Literary Trust is a registered literary nonprofit that publishes Saraba Magazine. Tade Ipadeola, Jumoke Verissimo, Ayobami Adebayo, Adebiyi Olusolape, Dami Ajayi and Emmanuel Iduma serve on the board of the Trust.

== See also ==
- Transition Magazine
- Kwani?
- Agbowo
- Lolwe
