= Yinka Elujoba =

Nigerian writer

- Education: Obafemi Awolowo University School of Visual Arts
- Occupations: Writer, editor, art critic
- Notable work: Collective Truth, Re-Imaging Futures: A Trans-Nigerian Conversation
- Awards: Rabkin Prize
- Website: https://www.elujoba.com/

Yinka Elujoba is a Nigerian writer, and editor who works as an art critic for The New York Times. He lives in Brooklyn, New York.

He was awarded the Rabkin Prize in 2021.

He received the Andy Warhol Foundation Art Writers Grant in 2023

== Personal life and education ==
Elujoba was born and raised in Lagos, Nigeria to civil servant parents. He has an Engineering degree from Obafemi Awolowo University, Ile-Ife, and in 2020 received an MFA in Art Writing from the School of Visual Arts, New York.

== Career ==
Elujoba has worked as a writer, editor, and art critic since 2010.

Elujoba has written two chapbooks, Collective Truth (2016), which is permanently collected at the Smithsonian Institution and Images of the Disconsolate (2017) as part of his work with the Invisible Borders' Trans-African Project.

In 2018, Elujoba and Innocent Ekejiuba won the Apexart International Exhibition grant, with their exhibition "Re-imaging Futures: A Trans-Nigerian Conversation" selected out of 538 eligible entries from 66 countries, their work was selected by an international panel of over 300 jurors and subsequently also selected by a nomination of over 13,000 public votes, as the best entry to receive the grant.

The exhibition, which took place from February 9 – March 9, 2019, at the Old Engine Test House, Nigeria Railway Corporation Compound, Ebute-Metta, Lagos was described as "explor(ing) the concept of Nigeria as a cartographic construct by colonial forces and its implications in contemporary Nigeria"

His essays and art criticism have been published in Harper's Magazine, ArtReview, Saraba Magazine The Brooklyn Rail and The New York Times, where he writes art criticism.

In 2020, Elujoba co-founded A Long House with Kechi Nomu and Gbenga Adesina.

== Works ==
- 2016 Collective Truth
- 2017 Images of the Disconsolate
- 2017 In History to My Barest Marrows conversation with Emmanuel Iduma for World Literature Today
- 2019 Re-imaging Futures: A Trans-Nigerian Conversation

== Awards and recognition ==
- 2021| Rabkin Prize from the Dorothea and Leo Rabkin Foundation.
- 2020| School of Visual Arts Faculty Award for MFA Thesis
- 2018| Apexart International Exhibition Grant (with Innocent Ekejiuba) for "Re-imaging Futures"
