= Invisible Borders Trans-African Photographers Organisation =

Artist initiative

Invisible Borders Trans-African Photographers Organization
- Nickname: Invisible Borders
- Formation: November 2009
- Founder: Emeka Okereke
- Founded at: Lagos, Nigeria
- Type: Collective, Non-Profit Organization
- Members: Uche James-Iroha, Nike Adesuyi-Ojeikere, Lucy Azubuike, Unoma Giese, Amaize Ojeikere, Charles Okereke, Ray-Daniels Okeugo, Uche Okpa-Iroha, Chriss Aghana Nwobu (2009)
- Website: http://invisible-borders.com

The Invisible Borders Trans-African Photographers Organization is an artist-led initiative founded in 2009. The initiative started as a collective led by Emeka Okereke alongside his colleagues, inspired by a road trip experience to Bamako from Lagos for the 8th edition of the Bamako Encounters Festival of Photography. The group is mainly known for its Trans-African Road Trip, which began in 2009. The Trans-African Road trip photography projects have been hosted at The 56th Venice Biennale, and The National museum of Modern Arts, Georges-Pompidou Centre, Paris.

== Background ==
The collective was formed as an initiative to overcome a trans-border road trip challenge proposed by Nigerian photographer; Emeka Okereke, as the response to an invitation to attend the 8th edition of the Bamako Photography Encounters at the Bamako Biennale. This challenge was inspired by his expedition from Lagos to Aba, with Ray-Daniels Okeugo. The founding members of the collective, Emeka Okereke and Uche Okpa-Iroha, explored the theme of the festival – "Borders", through an artistic travel adventure. They requested to exchange their flight tickets for money to travel to the festival by road with their colleagues who agreed to take on the challenge. The challenge became a dare within the group, whose members; Uche James-Iroha, Lucy Azubuike, Emeka Okereke, Amaize Ojeikere, Uche Okpa-Iroha, Ray-Daniels Okeugo, Unoma Giese, Chriss Nwobu, Nike Ojeikere and Charles Okereke, spearheaded the trip into a Trans-African Road Trip project. The group traveled in a black Volkswagen Mini bus rented from Photo Garage in Lagos, christened "Black Maria" for the journey to Bamako. They headed East of Lagos, on to the coastal expressway towards Benin and journeyed through Ghana, Togo and Burkina Faso.

The experiences encountered during the road trip to Bamako, influenced the transition of the collective into an organization which was named The Invisible Borders Organization. The Trans-African Road Trip project is an annual endeavor undertaken by artists who seek to explore and participate in various events, festivals and exhibitions collectively while sharing their independent encounters experienced during the trip across the continent. The project was adopted as a featured documentary, filmed by May Abdalla in 2013.

== Art Form ==
Photography is the dominantly employed artistic form. The adoption of other forms, mediums and disciplines such as Literature, Videography, Film, Performance art, public space interventions and other projects are an expansion of the scope of their operation as an organization.

== Invisible Borders Trans-African Initiative ==
The Invisible borders Trans-African Initiative hosted 8 road trips between 2009 and 2019 across over 20 countries in Africa but, also between Africa and Europe in 2014. The Trans-African Road Trip project directs members of a group of artists, photographers and writers go on a road trip lasting extensive periods, to combine art forms to initiate conversations about the influence of existing geographical borders on art enthusiasts and stakeholders across African countries.

=== Lagos - Bamako (2009) ===
The flagship road trip, themed: "The Invisible Borders", was organized by the founding members of the collective; Emeka Okereke and Uche Okpa-Iroha, with other members of the group. It held between November 3 and November 18 and featured a road trip to Bamako, Mali with stops in Benin, Ghana, Togo and Burkina Faso. The trip started from Lagos, Nigeria through Cotonou, Lomé, Accra, Hamile, Bobo-Dioulasso and finally Bamako. The curation of works was a recount of the ordeal experienced by the group during the trip to the Festival of Photography in Bamako, Mali. The concluding highlight of the trip was the Grand Prix Seydou Keïta Prize won by Uche Okpa-Iroha for images from his Under Bridge Life project in 2008.

=== Lagos - Dakar (2010) ===
The journey from Lagos to Dakar was a road trip to the Senegalese capital city for "Dak'Art - Biennale de l'Art Africain Contemporain"; a visual arts Dakar biennial held between May and June. Departing through the Trans–West African Coastal Highway, the road trip included visits to Cotonou, Lomé, Accra, and Abidjan, before detouring inland to Bamako, bypassing states of Liberia and Sierra Leone.

=== Lagos - Addis Ababa (2011) ===
The Trans-African Road trip project lasted from November 2 to December 16, 2011. It hosted 12 participants — 10 photographers and 2 writers — traveling from Lagos to Addis Ababa to curate stories that reveal the realities across borders and network with other indigenous artistes within the communities they engage. The group traveled from Lagos to Addis Ababa through Chad and Sudan.

=== Lagos - Libreville (2012) ===
In 2012, the Trans-African Road trip was scheduled for the August 23rd to the October 9th, 2012. The 49-day road trip, which was initially developed to be traveled from Lagos to Lubumbashi in Congo was re-routed to Libreville in Gabon due to transit challenges caused by the mud along an unpaved road between Ekok and Mamfe, toward Cameroon. Emeka Okereke, Ray-Daniels Okeugo, Lilian Novo Isioro, Lesedi Mogoathle (South Africa), Christian Nyampeta (Rwanda), Mario Macilau (Mozambique), Gloyer Matala Evita (Equatorial Guinea), Jide Odukoya, Emmanuel Iduma and Landry Mbassi (Cameroon) were members of the participating group.

=== Lagos - Sarajevo (2014) ===
In 2014, the first trans-continental trip of the Trans-African project was embarked on by 9 artists from 5 countries in which were Heba Amin (Egypt), Emmanuel Iduma, Angus MacKinnon (South Africa), Renee Mboya (Kenya), Lindokuhle Nkosi (South Africa), Emeka Okereke, Dawit L. Petros (Eritrea), Tom Saater and Breeze Yoko (South Africa).The group spent four months, journeying through 21 countries from Lagos, into Europe including controversial migration routes from Morocco into Spain, via the Strait of Gibraltar, and on to Sarajevo in Bosnia.

=== BORDERS WITHIN: A Trans-Nigerian Road Trip (2016 & 2017) ===
BORDERS WITHIN: A Trans-Nigerian Road Trip (2016)

The first Borders Within road trip happened in 2016. The road trip was letter concluded in 2017.

BORDERS WITHIN: A Trans-Nigerian Road Trip (2017)

The project was themed "Borders within II: The second trans-Nigerian road trip" and lasted for 34 days from October 8 to November 16 as a sequel to the project of the previous year. The group comprising Amara Nicole Okolo, Emeka Okereke, Kechi Nomu, Yinka Elujoba, James Bekenawei, Kenechukwu Nwatu, Nengi Nelson, Innocent Ekejiuba and Kemi Falodun, sought to further explore the concept of the borders within.

=== Lagos - Maputo (2018) ===
In 2018, the trip was a transit from Nigeria to Mozambique within a period of 95 days, held between August 20 and November 23. The project was a visual introspection into the post-colonial outlook of people in Africa with the Bantu people as a reference. The participants were batched (Batch A: August 20 – October 9, Batch B: October 6 – November 23) between trips from Lagos to Kampala and Kampala to Maputo as the trip involved routes from Enugu through Yaounde, Garoua-Boulaï, Bangui, Bukavu, Kigali, Kamembe, Kampala, Lusaka, Harare, Mutare and Maxixe. The participants were Wilfried Nakeu, Tope Salaudeen-Adégòke (now Tope-EniObanke Adegoke), Pamela Tulizo Kamale (DRC), Kenechukwu Nwatu, Barbara Wanjari (Kenya), Innocent Ekejiuba, Emeka Okereke, Kay Ugwuede, Wilfred Nakeu (Cameroon). The trip of the second batch of participants wasn't initiated as planned.
