= Pelumi Salako =

Nigerian journalist and photographer

Pelumi Salako is a Nigerian writer, freelance journalist and documentary photographer whose works touch on development, security, human rights, global health, and climate change in Nigeria and across West Africa. He has extensively covered queer struggles in West Africa, public health issues, ecological crises, and the herder–farmer conflicts in Nigeria.

== Education and Career ==
Based in Ilorin, Kwara State, Salako holds a Bachelor of Arts degree in History and International Studies from the University of Ilorin. It was there that he honed his skills in journalism as a member of the local chapter of the Union of Campus Journalists, a Nigerian student-run media organization. His writing and photography have appeared in international outlets including Al Jazeera, Reuters, Associated Press, The Guardian, The Independent, The Telegraph, National Public Radio (NPR), Foreign Policy, Mail & Guardian, and Internazionale.

Besides journalism and photography, Salako also writes poetry, and his works have been published in various journals and platforms such as Brittle Paper, Agbowó, Palette Poetry and Jalada Africa. His poetry collection, "Broken Things," was published in 2018, and he was also part of "Memento: An Anthology of Contemporary Nigerian Poetry" edited by Adedayo Agarau which featured Nigerian poets like Dami Ajayi, JK Anowe, Nome Patrick, Gbenga Adesina, I.S. Jones, Jide Badmus, Hussain Ahmed, Hauwa Shafii Nuhu among others.

In September 2023, Salako was arrested and detained by operatives of the Nigeria Police Force for being in possession of a laptop for which he could not immediately produce a receipt. He was released the same day following the swift intervention of the Foundation for Investigative Journalism.

Salako has received recognition for his work, including the 2023 Future Africa Award for Journalism in recognition of his storytelling and impactful reporting, and the third prize of the 2020 Bloomsday Poetry Competition organised by the Embassy of Ireland in Nigeria. He has also been selected as a fellow of the United Nations' Reham Al-Farra Memorial Journalism Fellowship.
