= Tendon (album) =

Studio album by Reniss
- Released: 24 October 2016
- Studio: New Bell Music Studios
- Genre: Mboko
- Languages: English, French, Pidgin, Nguemba
- Label: New Bell Music
- Producer: Le Monstre

Reniss chronology
Milkish EP (2015)	Tendon (2015)	Reniss Chante Les Classiques (2017)

Tendon is the first studio album by the Cameroonian artist Reniss. Released by New Bell Music on 24 October 2016, Tendon is a ten-song album, featuring Reniss' hit song "La Sauce." The album was produced by Jovi under his pseudonym "Le Monstre." "Michael Jackson", "La Sauce", and "Pilon" were released as singles for the album. Reniss sings in multiple languages on the album, including English, French, Pidgin, and Ngeumba.

== Critical reception ==
The popularity of the single and video "La Sauce" and the album Tendon earned her multiple nominations for awards, including winning the 2017 "Best Central African Artist" at the Kunde Awards (Burkina Faso) and the 2017 "Best Female Urban Artist" at the Canal d'Or Awards (Cameroon). Peabody-Award-winning Afropop Worldwide described Tendon as, "a remarkable piece of work...with the kind of ferocious creativity and assertiveness that suggests an international pop luminary in the making." The album is described on iTunes as a "breathtaking introduction to a sonic innovator who's carving out a singular musical path." Dekashu MacViban of Bakwa Magazine calls "La Sauce" "a refreshingly original take on a dominant Cameroonian genre, and Reniss’ version is urban, full of recognizable social commentary and slang." In 2017, "La Sauce" became the fans' and players' unofficial anthem for the Cameroon's Indominable Lions as they rose to win the 2017 AFCON championship. Reniss released five music videos from the album, including "Michael Jackson" (2015), "La Sauce" (2016), "Dashiki" (2016), "Manamüh" (2017), and "Pilon" (2017).

== Track listing ==
No.	Title	Writer(s)	Producer(s)	Length
1.	"Half"	Kien Rennise, Ndukong Godlove	Le Monstre	1:54
2.	"Pilon"	Kien Rennise, Ndukong Godlove	Le Monstre	4:11
3.	"Wusai" (featuring Jovi and Pascal)	Kien Rennise, Ndukong Godlove, Pascal	Le Monstre, Kiloh	5:17
4.	"Dashiki"	Kien Rennise, Ndukong Godlove	Le Monstre	3:53
5.	"Manamüh"	Kien Rennise, Ndukong Godlove	Le Monstre, Kiloh	3:37
6.	"I'm Ready"	Kien Rennise, Ndukong Godlove	Le Monstre	3:35
7.	"Michael Jackson" (featuring Jovi)	Kien Rennise, Ndukong Godlove	Le Monstre	3:35
8.	"La Sauce (Dans La Sauce)"	Kien Rennise, Ndukong Godlove	Le Monstre	4:37
9.	"Feel Like"	Kien Rennise, Ndukong Godlove	Le Monstre	3:39
10.	"More"	Kien Rennise, Ndukong Godlove	Le Monstre	3:21
