= Reniss =

RENISS
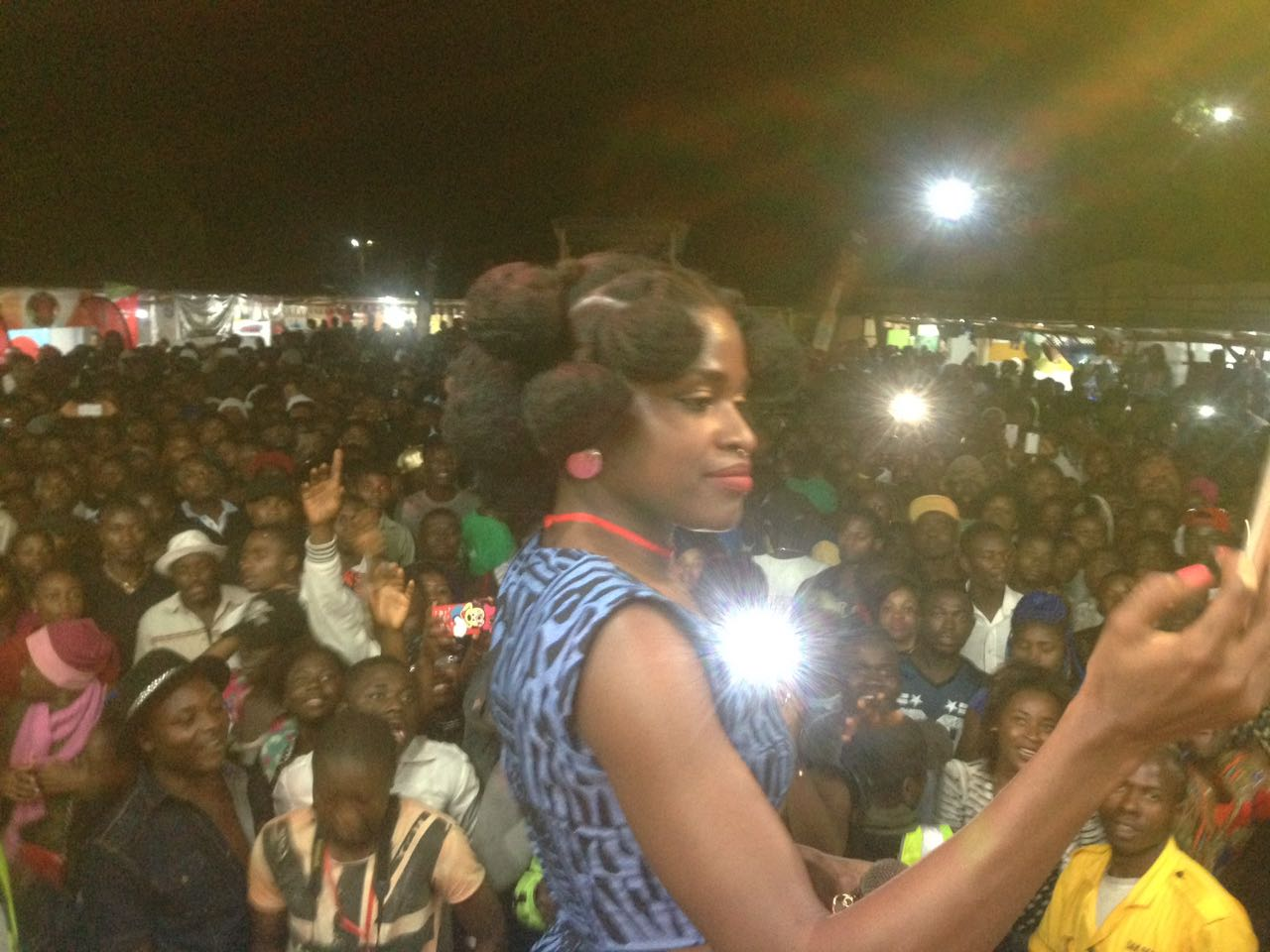
- Reniss performing in Dschang, Cameroon, 5 November 2016.

Background information
- Also known as: Reniss
- Born: Kien Rennise Nde; April 24, 1988 (age 38); Mankon, Cameroon
- Genres: Mboko
- Occupations: Singer, Songwriter, Entrepreneur
- Years active: 2012–present
- Labels: New Bell Music , RINGA REC.

Kien Rennise Nde (born April 24, 1988 in Mankon), known by her stage name Reniss, is a Cameroonian singer, songwriter and entrepreneur. Reniss sings in English, French, Pidgin, and Ngeumba. Reniss became well-known in the African music scene after releasing her music video "La Sauce" on May 6, 2016.

== Career ==
Reniss grew up in the neighbourhood of Deido and later moved with her family to Bonaberi, Mabanda, in Douala, Cameroon at the age of 15. Reniss was actively involved in church choirs at New Covenant and Presbyterian Church in Douala, and began singing at the age of 13. After traveling and performing in church events for many years, Reniss began working with Cameroonian producer and artist, Jovi. Reniss released her first singles, "Fire" and "Holy Wata" in 2011 and 2012, respectively, under Mumak record label. She continued to work with Jovi, featuring on his debut album, H.I.V, in 2012. In 2013, Reniss released her first EP, Afrikan LuV, an electronic influenced hybrid of pop and African rhythms, under the New Bell Music label.

Reniss released "C'est La Vie", her first music video with New Bell Music in October 2013. She became more recognized in Cameroon after featuring in the song and video "B.A.S.T.A.R.D" by Jovi in January 2014. In August 2015, Reniss released her second EP Milkish. After releasing several more videos, Reniss released the video for her single "La Sauce" in May 2016, gaining 2 million views in 6 months. "La Sauce" continued to gain popularity throughout Africa and Europe, and became the unofficial anthem for Cameroon's Indomitable Lions, during their rise to winning the 2017 AFCON. Reniss' debut LP Tendon was released in October 2016. Produced by Jovi under his alias "Le Monstre", in his Mboko style, the album is a hybrid of many genres including Bottle Dance, Njang, Bend Skin, Bikutsi, Makossa, dance hall, RnB, and more. On March 8, 2017 Reniss released her EP Reniss Chante Les Classiques in honor of International Women's Day. In the six-song EP, Reniss covers classic female African artists such as Miriam Makeba, Cesária Évora, and Bella Bellow. On May 19, 2017 Reniss released "Pilon", the fifth video from her album Tendon. In January 2018, Reniss released the 5-song EP Express Vol. 1, with an accompanying video "Doudou". She subsequently released the second video from the EP, "Night Life" featuring Jovi, on April 6, 2018.

== Discography ==
=== Albums ===
- Tendon [2016]
- Nzo [2020]

=== EPs ===
- Afrikan LuV [2013]
- Milkish [2015]
- Reniss Chante Les Classiques [2017]
- Express Vol. 1 [2018]
- Express Vol. 2 [2018]
- Encore Vol 1 [2025]
- Mboko Soul [2026]
