= Stay with Me (novel) =

2017 novel by Ayobami Adebayo

- First edition
- Author: Ayọ̀bámi Adébáyọ̀
- Language: English
- Genre: Domestic fiction
- Publisher: Canongate Books
- Publication date: March 2017
- Publication place: Nigeria
- Media type: Print
- Pages: 288
- ISBN: 978-1782119463

Stay with Me is a novel written by Nigerian author Ayọ̀bámi Adébáyọ̀. It was first published in 2017, by Canongate Books in the UK and subsequently by Alfred A. Knopf in the US.

== Plot summary ==
Yejide and Akinyele first met at a movie screening at the University of Ife, where they fell in love. By 1981, they were married, but four years later, they still did not have any children. Despite trying different remedies, they cannot conceive. Akin comes from a traditional Yoruba family, and a few years into their marriage, his family is growing increasingly frustrated with the couple’s childlessness. Akin’s mother, Moomi, arranged for Akin to take a second wife, a young woman named Funmi. Yejide and Akin who both grew up in a polygamous home find the practice unpleasant but pressure from his mother and others was too much to bear, he later gives in and marries Funmi and Yejide must accept it. Funmi’s arrival sparks a series of events where Yejide desperately tries to get pregnant, but then to protect herself, her marriage and her children from hardship and misfortune. At last she got pregnant but at a cost far greater than she could have dared to imagine.

The book is about the challenges faced by a Nigerian couple, Yejide and Akin, as they struggle with infertility and societal pressures. Their story explores themes of love, betrayal, and the sacrifices people make for family.

== Reception ==
Stay with Me was first published in 2017 in the UK by Canongate Books, to critical acclaim, and prior to publication, had been shortlisted for the Kwani? Manuscript Project, a prize for unpublished fiction, of which the series editor was Ellah Wakatama Allfrey.

Michiko Kakutani in her review of the novel for The New York Times described Adébáyọ̀ as "an exceptional storyteller", adding: "She writes not just with extraordinary grace but with genuine wisdom about love and loss and the possibility of redemption. She has written a powerfully magnetic and heartbreaking book." The book was published in the US by Alfred A. Knopf and in Nigeria by Ouida Books. It has been translated into more than 18 languages. It was selected as notable book of the year by several publications, including The New York Times, The Economist, The Wall Street Journal and The Guardian.

Stay with Me was shortlisted for the Wellcome Book Prize, the Baileys Women's Prize for Fiction, as well as for the 9mobile Prize for Literature, which it went on to win in 2019. It was also longlisted for the International Dublin Literary Award and the Dylan Thomas Prize.

In 2020, the Prix Les Afriques was awarded to Reste Avec Moi, the French edition of Stay with Me, translated by Josette Chicheportiche and published in 2019 by Charleston Editions.
