= Ariela Gross =

American historian

- Born: 1965 (age 60–61); Princeton, New Jersey, U.S.
- Awards: Lillian Smith Book Award

Academic background
- Education: B.A., History and Literature, Harvard University; JD., 1994, Stanford Law School; MA, 1991, PhD, History, 1996, Stanford University
- Thesis: Pandora's box slavery, character, and Southern culture in the courtroom, 1800-1860 (1996)

Academic work
- Institutions: UCLA School of Law
- Website: arielajgross.com

Ariela Julie Gross (born 1965) is an American historian. Previously the John B. and Alice R. Sharp Professor of Law and History at the University of Southern California Gould School of Law (USC), she is now a Distinguished Professor of Law at UCLA School of Law.

== Early life and education ==
Gross was born in 1965 and raised in Princeton, New Jersey. Selected for the Presidential Scholars Program after graduating from Princeton High School in 1983, Gross led an effort to have Presidential Scholars sign a petition requesting a nuclear freeze, which was presented to President Ronald Reagan with signatures from 14 of that year's 140 honorees. She attended Harvard University for her Bachelor of Arts degree in History and Literature and later earned her JD from Stanford Law School and Master's degree and PhD from Stanford University.

== Career ==
Upon earning her PhD, Gross joined the faculty at the University of Southern California Gould School of Law (USC) in 1996. During her early years at the school, Gross earned three fellowships; a Guggenheim Fellowship, the Frederick J. Burkhardt Fellowship from the American Council of Learned Societies, and a National Endowment for the Humanities Long-Term Fellowship at the Huntington Libraries. This allowed her to research American courts interpretations of racial identity throughout history. Gross' research led her to publish her first book titled Double Character: Slavery and Mastery in the Antebellum Southern Courtroom. The book focused on the legal proceedings of civil disputes over property in the deep South pre the American Civil War. She specifically focused on the legal dispute over slave ownership that required not only a moral judgment of slaves as human beings to be called into question but the moral judgment of the slave owners as well. In 2007, Gross received the USC's endowed faculty position title of John B. and Alice R. Sharp Professor of Law and History.

Following her endowed faculty appointment, Gross published her second book What Blood Won’t Tell: A History of Race on Trial in America through the Harvard University Press. The book focused on how American society built race as a social and political construct and why racial identity was important. Her book received the 2009 Lillian Smith Book Award, the James Willard Hurst Jr. Prize, and the American Political Science Association’s award for the best book on race, ethnicity, and politics. The following year, she accepted a short-term residency in Japan through the Organization of American Historians and the Japanese Association for American Studies to teach at Kyoto University.

During the 2017–18 academic year, Gross was a Fellow at the Center for Advanced Study in the Behavioral Sciences at Stanford University to work on a manuscript for a future book. In January 2020, Gross and Alejandro de la Fuente co-published their book Becoming Free, Becoming Black: Race, Freedom, and Law in Cuba, Louisiana, and Virginia through the Cambridge University Press. They examined three slave societies during the eighteenth and nineteenth centuries, Cuba, Virginia, and Louisiana, to explain how free and enslaved people of color used the law to gain freedom. In April, she was elected a Fellow of the Society of American Historians.

During her 27 years on the USC faculty, Gross co-founded the USC Center for Law, History and Culture and the Law and Humanities Interdisciplinary Workshop for Junior Scholars. In fall 2023, Gross joined UCLA School of Law as a Distinguished Professor.

== Publications ==
- "The manners of the people" : etiquette for the American republic, 1830-1860, 1987
- Pandora's box : slavery, character, and Southern culture in the courtroom, 1800-1860, 1996
- Litigating whiteness : trials of racial determination in the nineteenth century south, 1998
- Double character : slavery and mastery in the antebellum southern courtroom (Princeton University Press), 2000
- What blood won't tell : a history of race on trial in America (Harvard University Press), 2008
- Becoming Free, Becoming Black: Race, Freedom and Law in Cuba, Virginia, and Louisiana (with Alejandro de la Fuente, Cambridge University Press), 2020
