= H.I.V (album) =

H.I.V (Humanity is Vanishing)

Studio album by Jovi
- Released: August 31, 2012
- Recorded: Douala and Yaoundé, Cameroon
- Studio: White Apple Studios, STM Studios
- Genre: Mboko
- Language: Pidgin English, French, English
- Label: Mumak
- Producer: Le Monstre

Jovi chronology
H.I.V (Humanity is Vanishing)	Kankwe Vol. 1

H.I.V (also known stylistically as H.I.V (Humanity is Vanishing)) is the debut album of the Cameroonian rapper and producer Jovi, released August 31, 2012. Entirely self-produced under his producer alias, "Le Monstre", Jovi composed, recorded, and mixed the album in Yaoundé, Cameroon. The album blends instrumentation and rhythms from traditional Cameroonian genres with Western hip hop beats and style, as well as influences from pop, rock, electronic and industrial genres, and includes samples from African musicians Tabu Ley Rochereau and Eko Roosevelt. H.I.V received critical acclaim for its use of punchlines, rhyming, and wordplay in Pidgin English (which is widely spoken in Cameroon, but not considered a formal language), mixed with English and French. Jovi’s H.I.V album was highly anticipated in Cameroon following the release of his debut video “Don 4 Kwat” on October 14, 2011, which is seen as re-energizing the hip hop scene in Cameroon, which had largely been dormant and dominated by Bikutsi and Makossa genres. Originally released on iTunes for sale, the album was removed after one year, and became available for free download on Bandcamp on September 12, 2013, according to the website, as a "special edition of Jovi's debut album."

== Critical reception ==
The album was well received by Cameroonians and also received some recognition in other African countries. According to African culture and entertainment magazine, Je Wanda magazine, "H.I.V is an array of variety, from the Pidgin English, the instrumentation and the audacious themes that only gives the album the much needed global and local appeal that was previously missing in Cameroon hip hop." The Cameroonian literary magazine Bakwa stated that "H.I.V is a colorful addition, not only to a budding local hip-hop scene but to the contemporary Cameroonian music scene as a whole; it is the long awaited arrival of a self-assured emcee very conscious of his abilities, the vacuum in the genre, his audience’s expectations, and the right dose of hustle to assert his place amongst the likes of Les Nubians and X-Maleya as a flag-bearer on stages across the globe." Pan-African magazine Okayafrica declared that H.I.V. "delivers on that notion in that it’s loaded with some of the cleanest and most original rap production we’ve heard out of Cameroon lately. Throughout the album infectious melodies are crafted out of 808s, local instruments, and the “signature bell sounds” of Le Monstre..."

== Track listing ==
No.	Title	Writer(s)	Producer(s)	Length
1.	"Don 4 Kwat"	Jovi	Le Monstre	3:16
2.	"Man Pass Man"	Jovi	Le Monstre	3:06
3.	"All I Have"	Jovi, Elad	Le Monstre	3:57
4.	"Pitié (featuring Rochereau Tabu Ley)"	Jovi, Rochereau Tabu Ley	Le Monstre	3:25
5.	"2 Much (featuring Magasco)"	Jovi, Magasco	Le Monstre	3:33
6.	"Lapiro"	Jovi	Le Monstre	3:14
7.	"Hater's Coffin (featuring Rachel Applewhite)"	Jovi, Rachel Applewhite	Le Monstre	3:27
8.	"Bush Faller (featuring Eko Roosevelt)"	Jovi, Eko Roosevelt	Le Monstre	2:49
9.	"New Star (featuring Crisley & Jade)"	Jovi, Crisley, Jade	Le Monstre	3:26
10.	"Nothing to Something (featuring Dee Cey & Will Can)"	Jovi, Dee Cey, Will Can	Le Monstre	4:16
11.	"Achombo House (featuring Krotal)"	Jovi, Krotal	Le Monstre, Chavez	3:40
12.	"You Never Know (featuring Shashan)"	Jovi, Shashan, Abigail Doh, Rachel Applwhite, Michel Sanchez, Eric Mouquet	Le Monstre	3:38
13.	"H.I.V (featuring Reniss)"	Jovi, Reniss	Le Monstre, Chavez	4:17
