= 16 Wives =

Studio album by Jovi
- Released: February 16, 2017
- Venues: New Bell Music Studios; Yaoundé, Cameroon
- Genre: Mboko
- Length: 0:56
- Languages: French, English, Pidgin, Douala, Ngemba
- Label: New Bell Music
- Producer: Le Monstre

16 Wives is the third full-length studio album by Cameroonian rapper, composer, and producer, Jovi. Released on Bandcamp on February 16, 2017, the 16-song album was produced by Jovi under his pseudonym, Le Monstre. 16 Wives was recorded, mixed, and mastered at New Bell Music Studios in Yaoundé, Cameroon, and released on his record label New Bell Music. The album was listed as a best-seller on Bandcamp during its first week of sales, and released on iTunes and other digital platforms on February 24, 2017.

== Background and promotion ==
16 Wives contains lyrics in Pidgin, English, French, Douala, and Ngemba. The album follows the style of Jovi's previous 5 EPs and 2 LPs, which he calls "Mboko", characterized by mixing traditional African rhythms and instrumentation (such as Bikutsi) with contemporary genres such as hip-hop, RnB, pop, and electronic. On November 16, 2016, Jovi released "Mongshung", the first video to promote the album. On December 7, he released the cover art for the album. Jovi released the second video "Ou Même", on February 17, one day after the album was released.

== Critical reception ==
16 Wives was generally well received by music critics in Cameroon and internationally, particularly the production of the album. According to Koko Aldo Tsague of Le Bled Parle, Jovi's "epic production of the album perfectly combines African musical traditions with contemporary hip hop" (translated from French). In reviewing the album's single "Ou Même", Sebastian Bouknight of Afropop Worldwide states that Jovi "combines his witty social commentary with premium production skills to craft a unique sound that has roots in hip-hop, trap, R&B, and local bikutsi rhythms." In Jeune Afrique, Mathieu Olivier states that Jovi uses his engineering skills "acquired in India, to deliver a high-quality, technical album" (translated from French). Paris-based Oodar Africa reviewed 16 Wives and called Jovi "one of the best producers on the African continent" (translated from French).

The tone and lyrical content of 16 Wives has been described as more sensitive than his previous two LPs. Jovi sings more on the album and addresses more personal subject matter in songs like "Free Music" which talks about love, and "Mad Love/Hospital Bills", which tells a story about the death of a girlfriend. This Is Africa contributor Nchanji M. Njamnsi agrees that in Jovi's previous albums looking for tenderness is like "looking for a needle in a haystack," but he states that the experimental sound "poses the danger of narrowing his audience to only a small group of connoisseurs and people who have a rich musical culture like himself."

== Track listing ==
No.	Title	Writer(s)	Length
1.	"Free Music"	Ndukong Godlove	5:00
2.	"Man Pass Man Pt. 3"	Ndukong Godove	3:03
3.	"Ou Même"	Ndukong Godlove	4:13
4.	"Tchana Pierre"	Ndukong Godlove	2:41
5.	"Sux"	Ndukong Godlove, Kiloh	2:29
6.	"Mongshung"	Ndukong Godlove	3:22
7.	"Workmanship" (featuring Pascal)	Ndukong Godlove, Pascal	4:14
8.	"How Many So Many" (featuring Pascal)	Ndukong Godlove, Pascal	1:48
9.	"No Man"	Ndukong Godlove	3:13
10.	"Slave Ships"	Ndukong Godlove	3:37
11.	"50-50" (featuring Reniss)	Ndukong Godlove, Kien Rennise, Tatapong Beyala	4:51
12.	"Chubaka"	Ndukong Godlove	4:20
13.	"Tom Yoms"	Ndukong Godlove	2:56
14.	"Why God"	Ndukong Godlove	3:00
15.	"On Est Bien"	Ndukong Godlove	3:12
16.	"Mad Love-Hospital Bills"	Ndukong Godlove	4:12
