= Bakwa (magazine) =

Cameroonian literary magazine

- Screenshot of Bakwa in 2015
- Categories: Literary magazine
- Founder: Dzekashu MacViban
- Founded: 2011
- Country: Cameroon
- Language: English
- Website: bakwamagazine.com

Bakwa is an online and print literary magazine based in Yaoundé, Cameroon. First published in 2011, it has been described as "an eclectic, intelligent take on the dynamic cultural scenes often missed by mainstream, western media". Notable contributors include: Imbolo Mbue, Kangsen Feka Wakai, Jeremy Klemin, Serubiri Moses, Minna Salami, Jack Little, Emmanuel Iduma, Bwesigye bwa Mwesigire and Johnnie MacViban.

== History ==
Founded during the last quarter of 2011 (but operational as from 2012) by Dzekashu MacViban, Bakwa rose out of the need to fill the lacuna created by the absence of literary and cultural magazines in Cameroon, notably the defunct Pala Pala magazine, and it highlights a new dynamic Africa, often ignored by Western traditional media.

Over the years, Bakwa has been able to establish alliances with important publications such as The Guardian (Guardian Africa Network), Chimurenga magazine, Kwani?, Saraba and The Ofi Press, which have led to collaborations on various projects.

== Notable projects ==
For its third issue, in 2012, Bakwa collaborated with The Ofi Press, an online literary magazine based in Mexico and edited by Jack Little. The Ofi Press published a special West African edition, with content in English and Spanish, which focused on West Africa, while Bakwa, in turn, published a special Mexican issue, focusing on Mexican art, culture and society, with most of the content in English and some Spanish translations. The project was lauded by several journals and outlets, especially the online website Heritage 1960

In 2015, Bakwa was part of #100DaysofAfricanReads, a social media project curated by Angela Wachuka, executive director of Kwani?, which entailed "a series of portraits on books, writers and readers, over a 100 day period ... highlighting the work of an African author in print and online". With the exception of an excerpt from Awes Osman's novel, Skinless Goat in Somalia, Bakwa's contribution to the project was made up of excerpts and stories from female Cameroonian writers. In the same year, in response to The Simpsons' episode "The Princess Guide", Bakwa did a two-part series on The Simpsons, wherein, bloggers, writers, cultural thinkers and academics were asked to comment on "The Princess Guide" episode. Most of the reactions highlighted poor research, one-dimensional characters, the challenge of portraying believable Nigerians, and the episode's relatable character, Princess Kemi. This project on The Simpsons was later chosen by Dead Homer Society, for the "weekend reading" section.

In 2016, thanks to a partnership with Goethe-Institut Kamerun and Phoneme Media, Bakwa launched a one-off short story competition open to Cameroonians under 39 years. This was followed by a literary exchange programme in 2017, between Cameroonain and Nigerian writers, in partnership with Saraba Magazine and the Goethe-Institut in Cameroon and Nigeria.

== See also ==
- Transition Magazine
- Kwani?
