= Troy Onyango =

Kenyan writer, editor and lawyer (born 1993)

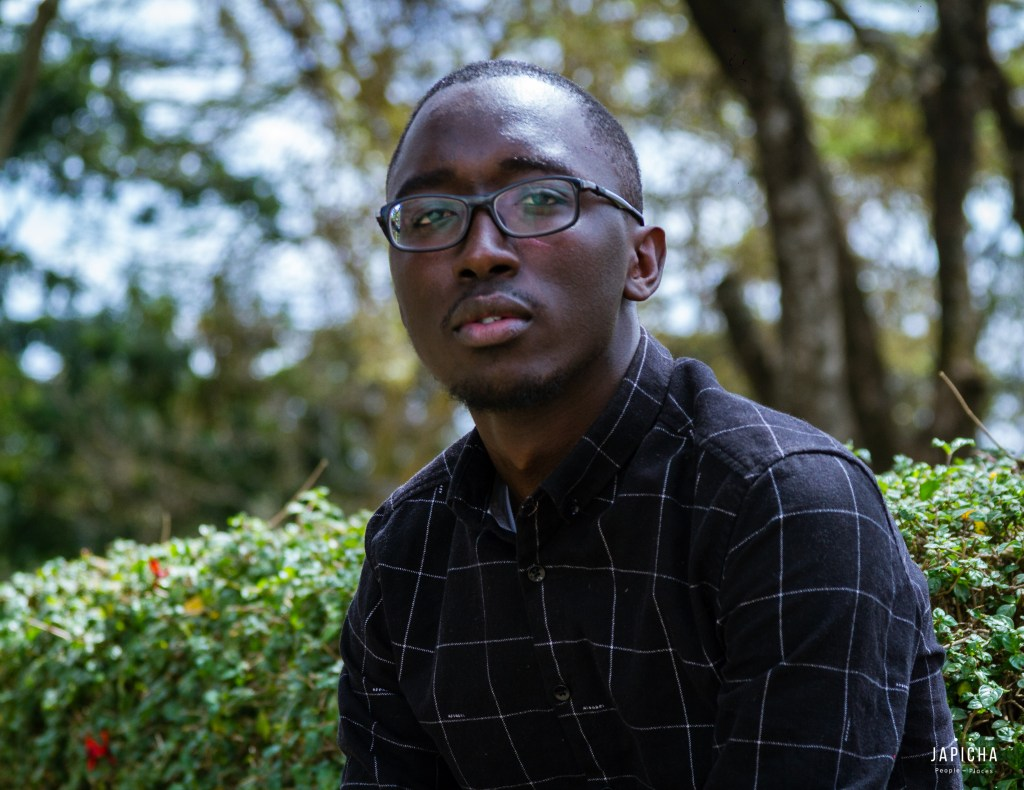
- Onyango in 2015
- Born: 1993 (age 32–33); Kisumu, Kenya
- Education: University of East Anglia; University of Nairobi
- Occupations: Writer; Lawyer
- Website: troyonyango.com

Troy Onyango (born 1993) is a Kenyan writer, editor and lawyer. His work has appeared in journals and magazines including Prairie Schooner, Wasafiri, Caine Prize Anthology, Brittle Paper, and Transition Magazine issue 121, for which his short story "The Transfiguration" was nominated for the Pushcart Prize. His short story "For What Are Butterflies Without Their Wings" won the fiction prize for the inaugural Nyanza Literary Festival (NALIF) Prize.

== Life and career ==
Troy Onyango was born and grew up in Kisumu, an inland port city along the shores of Lake Victoria in Western Kenya. He attended the University of Nairobi, where he studied law. He obtained an MA in creative writing from the University of East Anglia where he was a recipient of the Miles Morland Foundation Writing Scholarship.

In 2016, he won the inaugural Nyanza Literary Festival (NALIF) Prize for his short story "For What Are Butterflies Without Their Wings". In the same year, his short story "The Transfiguration", which follows the life of a transgender character who struggles to navigate Nairobi, was nominated for the Pushcart Prize by Transition Magazine. He was also shortlisted for the Miles Morland Foundation Scholarship in 2016. He attended the May/June 2018 Ebedi International Writers' Residency in Iseyin, Oyo State, Nigeria, In 2018, Onyango was listed among the 21 Best African Writers of the New Generation by Woke Africa.

Onyango is the founder and editor of Lolwe, an online magazine that publishes fiction, literary criticism, personal essays, photography, and poetry. He is also the editor of Panorama: The Journal of Intelligent Travel, a British literary journal with a modern focus on travel literature, art, and photography.

== Works ==
=== Short stories ===
- "All Things Bright & Beautiful" in Caine Prize Anthology (2018)
- "Little Daju" in AFREADA
- "Wet Ash" in Ebedi Review
- "For What Are Butterflies Without Their Wings?"
- "The Transfiguration" in Transition Magazine
