= Years of Shame =

Nigerian historical novel by Obinna Udenwe

- Author: Obinna Udenwe
- Language: English
- Genre: Historical fiction
- Publication place: Nigeria
- Media type: Print

Years of Shame is a Nigerian historical novel by Obinna Udenwe. The novel follows the consequences of Patrice Ikebe's decision to invoke the ukpa ji-ukpa nwa oath after accusing another man of theft, with the resulting events unfolding across multiple generations. Set partly against the backdrop of the Ọgụ Teteri (First Izii Revolt), the novel received positive critical attention for its historical scope and treatment of Igbo history and culture, although reviewers also criticised its editing and production quality.

== Plot ==
Patrice Ikebe accuses Methuselah Enigwe of stealing money belonging to him and invokes the ukpa ji-ukpa nwa oath in an effort to prove his accusation. The decision sets in motion events that affect his descendants and community over several generations.

The novel incorporates events connected with the Ọgụ Teteri, also known as the First Izii Revolt, alongside the experiences of communities in southeastern Nigeria.

== Reception ==
Writing for The Lagos Review, Sima Essien described the novel as "an ambitious epic of tragedy, history & culture" and compared its protagonist, Patrice Ikebe, to tragic figures such as Oedipus and Okonkwo.

Reviewing the novel for Afrocritik, Chimezie Chika described the work as a Nigerian reinterpretation of Oedipus Rex and praised its engagement with the history of the First Izii Revolt and relations among Igbo communities.

The Nation later highlighted the novel's engagement with historical memory in a retrospective review of the work.

Azubuike Obi writing for Afapinen praised the novel's contribution to recovering lesser-known historical experiences in southeastern Nigeria through fiction.

Both Afrocritik and Brittle Paper criticised the novel's editing and production quality, citing issues with punctuation, typesetting and copy-editing.
