= The Carnivorous City =

2016 novel by Toni Kan

- Author: Toni Kan
- Set in: Lagos
- Published: 2016
- Publisher: Cassava Republic Press
- Publication place: Nigeria

The Carnivorous City is a literary fiction novel by Nigerian writer Toni Kan. His second book and his first novel, it was published in 2016 by Cassava Republic Press. The story tells human struggles in Lagos. Michael Sears of New York Journal of Books calls a memoir for Lagos.
