= Carey Baraka =

Kenyan writer

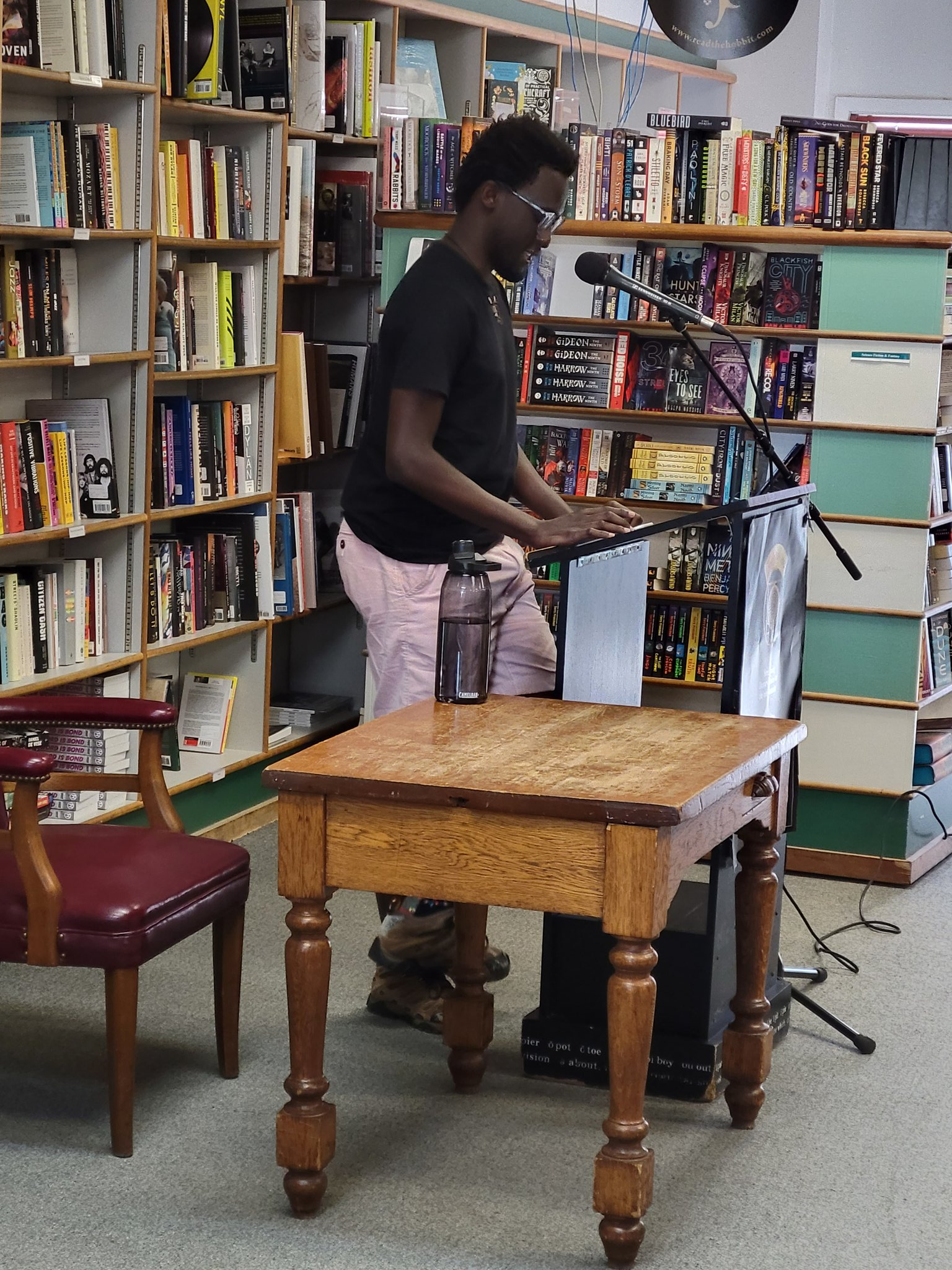
Baraka reading in Iowa in 2022

Carey Baraka (born 1996) is a Kenyan writer of fiction and nonfiction. He was born in Kisumu, Kenya. He studied philosophy at the University of Nairobi. In 2024, he was announced as one of the winners of the Miles Morland Writing Scholarship.

== Career ==
Baraka is known for his writing about African literary culture. In 2023, he wrote about Ngugi wa Thiong'o for The Guardian, and he has also written about Yvonne Adhiambo Owuor, Kwani?, Isak Dinesen and the history of Kampala as a literary capital in Africa. In 2024, he wrote about the cult killings in Shakahola for The Economist's 1843 Magazine, and was shortlisted for the Fetisov Award and the True Story Award for his work. He has also covered East Africa for Foreign Policy, The New York Review of Books, Financial Times, and The New York Times.

== Awards ==
He has been shortlisted for the True Story Award, and the Festisov Award, and he has won the Miles Morland Scholarship, a MacDowell Fellowship, a fellowship from the University of Iowa's International Writing Program, and received grants from the Pulitzer Center and the Silvers Foundation.
