= Ayobami Adebayo =

Nigerian writer (born 1988)

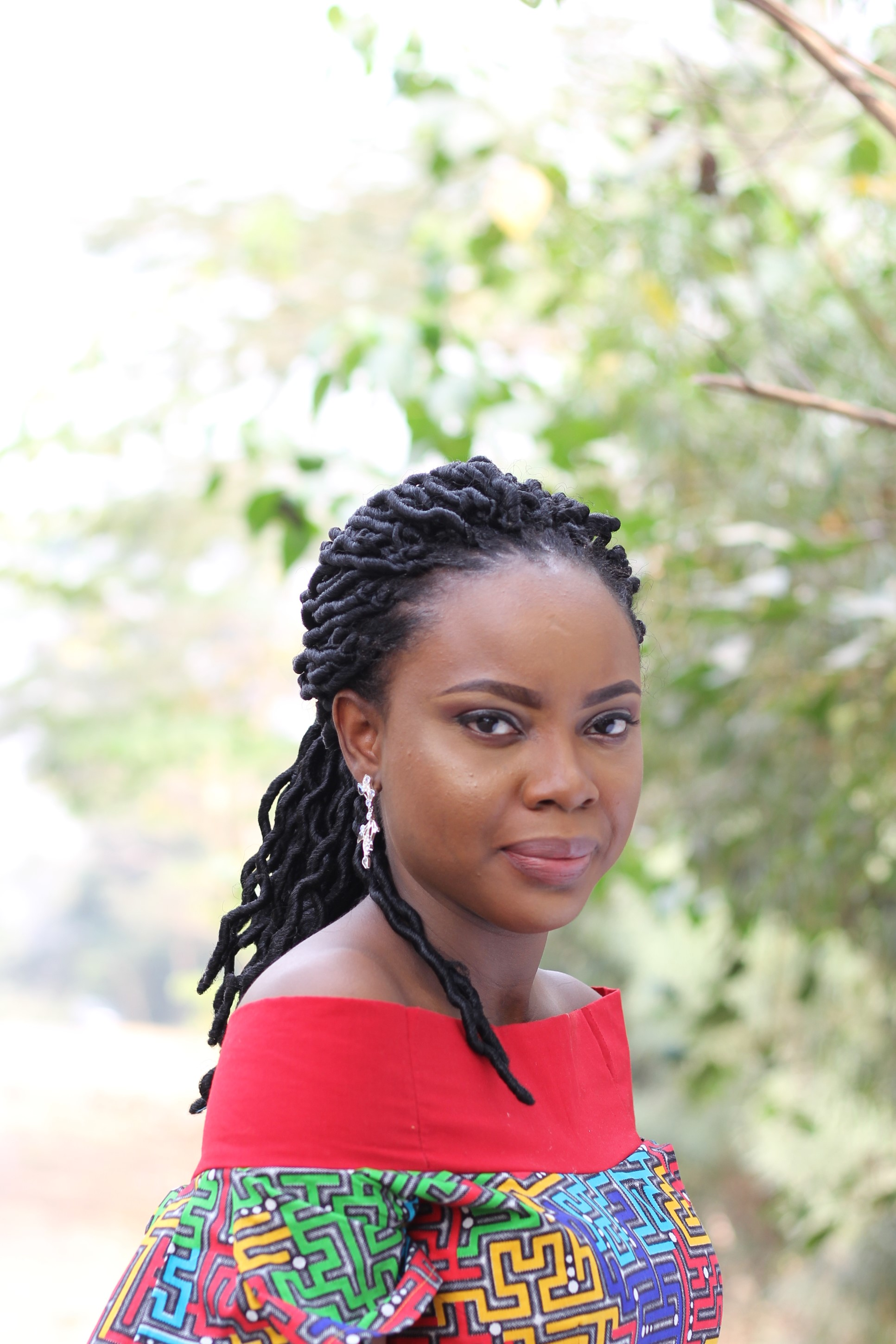
- Portrait of Adebayo
- Born: January 29, 1988 (age 38); Lagos, Nigeria
- Education: Obafemi Awolowo University; University of East Anglia
- Occupation: Writer
- Notable work: Stay With Me (2017), A Spell of Good Things (2023)
- Spouse: Emmanuel Iduma (m. 2020)
- Awards: 9mobile Prize for Literature The Future Awards Africa
- Website: www.ayobamiadebayo.com

Ayobami Adebayo (born 29 January 1988) is a Nigerian writer, whose debut novel, Stay With Me, won the 9mobile Prize for Literature in 2017. She was awarded The Future Awards Africa Prize for Arts and Culture in the same year.

== Early life ==
Adebayo was born on 29 January 1988 in Lagos, Nigeria. Her family relocated to Ilesa and then to Ile-Ife, where she spent most of her childhood in the University Staff Quarters of Obafemi Awolowo University.

== Career ==
Adebayo studied at Obafemi Awolowo University, where she earned BA and MA degrees in Literature in English. She went on to study Creative Writing at the University of East Anglia, where she was awarded an International Bursary. She studied writing with Chimamanda Ngozi Adichie and Margaret Atwood.

In 2015, Adebayo was listed by Financial Times as one of the bright stars of Nigerian literature. She published her debut novel titled Stay With Me in 2017 by Canongate Books . She was called "an exceptional storyteller" by Michiko Kakutani in a review for The New York Times. In 2019, Josette Chicheportiche translated the novel into French as Reste avec moi and it was published by Charleston Editions.

Adébáyọ̀ has been a writer in residence at Ledig House Omi, Hedgebrook, Sinthian Cultural Institute, Ox-Bow School of Art, MacDowell Colony and Ebedi Hills. She was shortlisted for the Miles Morland Scholarship in 2014 and 2015.

In 2021, Adébáyọ̀'s second novel, A Spell of Good Things – described as being "about family secrets and bonds, thwarted hope, and the brutal realities of life in a society rife with inequality" – was announced for publication by Canongate (UK) and Knopf (US). Released in 2023, A Spell of Good Things received favourable review coverage, including in The Observer (where it was described as "immensely readable") and in The New York Times, with Aamina Ahmad noting that "[w]here a raw, dynamic storytelling energized Adébáyò's prose in 'Stay With Me,' here the graceful, stately quality of the sentences evokes restraint, avoiding sentimentality". It was longlisted for the 2023 Booker Prize and shortlisted for the Dylan Thomas Prize. A Spell of Good Things was shortlisted for the 2024 Encore Award, given by the Royal Society of Literature to celebrate the "difficult second novel" that follows an author's literary debut.

In April 2026, it was announced that Adébáyò was awarded a Gates Cambridge Scholarship to undertake a PhD in Digital Humanities. Her research will focus on "the intersections between literature, technology, and culture, with a focus on how African literary magazines have facilitated networks of stylistic and thematic innovations among writers and editors."

== Other literary work ==
In 2024, Adébáyọ̀ was a judge for the Women's Prize for Fiction, and was announced as a jury member for the 2025 Booker Prize.

== Personal life ==
Adébáyọ̀ is married to Emmanuel Iduma. The couple announced their marriage in 2021, although in his memoir, Iduma notes that their wedding took place in 2020.

== Bibliography ==
=== Novels ===
- Stay with Me (2017). Knopf, US; 2017. Canongate Books, UK (ISBN 978-1782119463)
- A Spell of Good Things (2023). Canongate Books (ISBN 9781838856045)

=== Other writing ===
One of Adébáyọ̀'s stories was highly commended in the 2009 Commonwealth Short Story Competition. Her poems and stories have been published in several magazines and anthologies, including East Jasmine Review, Farafina Magazine, Saraba Magazine, Kalahari Review, Lawino Magazine, Speaking for the Generations: An Anthology of New African Writing, Off the Coast: Maine's International Journal of Poetry, Ilanot Review, Gambit: Newer African Writing, and New Daughters of Africa: An international anthology of writing by women of African descent (edited by Margaret Busby). Adébáyọ̀ has also written non-fiction pieces for Elle UK and the BBC.

== Awards ==
- 2017: Shortlisted for the Baileys Women's Prize for Fiction.
- 2017: WINNER The Future Awards Africa (Arts and Culture).
- 2018: Shortlisted for the Wellcome Book Prize.
- 2019: WINNER 9mobile Prize for Literature for Stay With Me.
- 2020: WINNER Prix Les Afriques for Stay With Me.
- 2023: Longlisted for the Booker Prize for A Spell of Good Things.
- 2024: Shortlisted for the Dylan Thomas Prize for A Spell of Good Things.
- 2024: Shortlisted for the Encore Prize for A Spell of Good Things.
