= A Spell of Good Things =

2023 novel by Ayobami Adebayo

- Author: Ayọ̀bámi Adébáyọ̀
- Language: English
- Genre: Domestic fiction
- Publisher: Canongate Books
- Publication date: February 2023
- Publication place: Nigeria
- Media type: Print
- ISBN: 9781838856045

A Spell of Good Things is a literary fiction novel written by Nigerian novelist Ayọ̀bámi Adébáyọ̀ and published by Canongate Books in February 2023. It is nominated for the 2023 Booker Prize and shortlisted for the Dylan Thomas Prize and Encore Award.

== Plot summary ==
Eniola, a young boy attending secondary school, hails from a once middle-class family that has fallen into poverty following his father's loss of employment as a history teacher. Eniola stands out in his community due to his remarkable height, which often leads people to mistake him for someone much older. His father's unemployment forces Eniola to take on various odd jobs, including assisting a local tailor and running errands, while also resorting to begging on occasion to make ends meet. Despite his challenging circumstances, Eniola holds onto his dreams of achieving greatness and a better life.

Wuraola, on the other hand is a successful young doctor from a wealthy family. Her romantic involvement with Kunle, the son of a prominent politician, adds a layer of complexity to her life.The paths of Eniola and Wuraola intersect unexpectedly when a local politician takes an interest in Eniola, altering the course of both their lives. The situation escalates dramatically during a family gathering, as an eruption of violence disrupts the event and sends shockwaves through their community. Through her compelling storytelling, Ayọ̀bámi Adébáyọ̀ explores the stark divide between the privileged and the underprivileged in Nigeria, highlighting the shared humanity that connects them all.

== Characters ==
- Eniola
- Eniola’s father
- Wuraola
- Kunle
- Motara
- Yeye
