= Emeka Okereke =

Nigerian photographer (born 1980)

- Born: 1980 (age 45–46); Aba, Abia, Nigeria

Emeka Okereke (born 1980) is a Nigerian photographer, filmmaker, writer and visual artist who lives and works in Lagos and Berlin.

Okereke is the cofounder of the Invisible Borders Trans-African Photographers Organisation.

In 2018, he received Chevalier des Arts et Lettres from the Government of France.

== Education ==
Emeka received a Master's from the École nationale supérieure des Beaux-Arts de Paris (The National Superior school of fine arts of Paris) in 2008.

== Career ==
In 2009, Okereke founded The Invisible Borders Trans-African Organisation, a collective of artists whose projects include the Invisible Borders Trans-African Road Trip and The Trans-African, a journal of African arts and visual culture.

His installation 'A Trans-African Workspace', was exhibited at the 56th Venice Biennale in 2015.

In summer of 2018, Okereke guest lectured at the Summer Academy of Fine Arts, Salzburg, Austria.

In 2018, he was awarded Chevalier De l’Ordre Des Arts et Des Lettres (Knight of the Order of Arts and Letters) from the French Government, in recognition of his significant contributions to the arts in Africa and Europe.

== Selected exhibitions ==
=== Solo exhibitions ===
- 2018: "Exploring a Void". Salzburger Kunstverein, Salzburg Austria (Solo Exhibition)
- 2008 Bagamoyo – Photography and the Useful Space / Maputo-Catembe – Maputo, Mozambique

=== Group exhibitions ===
- 2017 * Collective Thinking, For Freedoms / Aperture Foundation – New York, United States
- 2017 * Collectivism. Collectives and Their Quest For Value / Amsterdam Photography Museum (Foam) – Amsterdam, Netherlands
- 2018: "Whose Land Have I Lit on Now?", Savvy Contemporary Berlin
- 2016 * No Borders / Gallery Dominique Fiat, – Paris, France
- 2016 * Unseen Art Photo Fair / Unseen Amsterdam – Amsterdam, Netherlands
- 2015 * 56th Venice Biennale / Venice Biennale – Venice, Italy

== Publications ==
- 2018 * Countering Western Hegemony Through Trans-African Exchange
- 2017 * Africulture- Le Grand Palais n’aurait pas pu être construit sans l’exploitation coloniale de l’Afrique
- 2017 * ContemporaryAnd : The Neighbour-Hood Project
- 2016 * Trans-Africanism: An Urban Essay in The New African Magazine
- 2015 * Black Portraitures: Whose Black Is it? in Minor Literatures
- 2013 * Artscape by Al Jazeera- Emeka Okereke: Invisible Borders
- 2013 * Okay Africa- Emeka Okereke on Photography And a World of Possibilities

== Awards and honours ==
2018 – Chevalier De l’Ordre Des Arts et Des Lettres (Knight of the Order of Arts and Letters)

2016 Nominee, Prix Elysée for Photography (2016–2018)

2016 Long list nominee, Prix Pictet, 2016

2009 Artist of the Year, The Future Awards Africa

2008 Winner, Visa Pour la Creation for project "Bagamoyo", Maputo Mozambique

2004 TV5, Paris Prize for Best Photography at the Exhibition "Made in Africa", Milan Italy.

2003 Best Young Photographer of the 5th Festival of photography. Bamako, Mali.
