= Adedayo Agarau =

Nigerian poet

- Born: 1994 (age 31–32); Ibadan, Nigeria
- Education: Higher National Diploma, Rufus Giwa Polytechnic, Owo (2019); MFA, Iowa Writers' Workshop (2023); Wallace Stegner Fellowship, Stanford University (2023-2025); PhD candidate, University of Southern California (in progress)
- Occupations: Poet, editor, educator
- Writing career
- Genre: Poetry
- Notable work: The Years of Blood (2025)
- Notable awards: The Future Awards Africa Prize for Literature (2025); C.P. Cavafy Poetry Prize (2024); Poetic Justice Institute Editor's Prize for BIPOC Writers (2023-24); Wallace Stegner Fellowship (2023-2025); Cave Canem Fellowship (2023)
- Website: adedayoagarau.com

Adedayo Agarau (born 1994) is a Nigerian poet whose work explores themes of ritual violence, memory, and African spiritualism. He is the author of the full-length poetry collection The Years of Blood (Fordham University Press, 2025), which won the Poetic Justice Institute Editor's Prize for BIPOC Writers. Agarau is the Editor-in-Chief of Agbowó Magazine, a journal dedicated to African literature and art, and serves as Poetry Reviews Editor for The Rumpus.

As a Nigerian poet working at the intersection of tradition and contemporary experience, Agarau's poetry has appeared in publications including Poetry Magazine, Guernica, World Literature Today, and Iowa Review. A Wallace Stegner Fellow at Stanford University (2023-2025) and Cave Canem Fellow, he holds an MFA from the Iowa Writers' Workshop. In 2024, he won the C.P. Cavafy Poetry Prize for his poem "Halloween, Iowa."

Beyond his creative work, Agarau is active in building literary communities across Africa. He founded The Arole Agarawu International Poetry Prize for African Writers and co-founded Poetry Sango-Ota, a mentoring platform for emerging Nigerian poets. He curated Memento: An Anthology of Contemporary Nigerian Poetry (2020), a landmark collection showcasing the work of Nigerian poets, and is a member of the UnSerious Collective.

== Early life and education ==
Agarau was born in Ibadan, Nigeria in 1994. He earned his Higher National Diploma in Human Nutrition and Dietetics from Rufus Giwa Polytechnic, Owo in 2019.

He obtained his MFA in Poetry from the Iowa Writers' Workshop at the University of Iowa in 2023, where he was recognized with multiple scholarships including the Stanley Award for International Research. He subsequently served as a Wallace Stegner Fellow at Stanford University from 2023 to 2025.

== Literary career ==
=== Poetry and publications ===
Agarau's debut full-length collection, The Years of Blood, was published by Fordham University Press in September 2025. The collection addresses ritual killings and child abductions in Nigeria, particularly in Ibadan, drawing on Yoruba cosmology and folklore. The work won the 2023-24 Poetic Justice Institute Editor's Prize for BIPOC Writers and was listed among the most anticipated poetry collections of 2025 by Isele Magazine, The Modaculture, and Open Country Magazine.

Prior to his debut collection, Agarau published three chapbooks that established his reputation as a leading voice in contemporary African poetry: For Boys Who Went (2016), The Origin of Name (African Poetry Book Fund, 2020), and The Arrival of Rain (Vegetarian Alcoholic Press, 2020). The Origin of Name was selected by poets Kwame Dawes and Chris Abani for the New-Generation African Poets chapbook box set, which showcased emerging voices in African poetry.

His poems have appeared in numerous literary journals including Poetry Magazine, Guernica, World Literature Today, Iowa Review, Poet Lore, and Poetry Society of America. His work has been featured in exhibitions at the Wellcome Collections of Medicine in London and the Paris Photo Exhibition, demonstrating the visual and interdisciplinary dimensions of his poetry.

=== Editorial work and literary leadership ===
Agarau serves as Editor-in-Chief of Agbowó Magazine, one of the leading journals dedicated to African literature and art. In this role, he has been instrumental in platforming African writers and promoting contemporary African literary voices. He is also Poetry Reviews Editor at The Rumpus, where he contributes to critical discourse on poetry.

He was a founding editor at IceFloe Press, where he served as New International Voices editor and African Chapbook Acquisition manager, focusing on publishing works by African poets and expanding access to African poetry internationally.

In 2020, Agarau curated and edited Memento: An Anthology of Contemporary Nigerian Poetry, a significant collection that documents the diverse voices and styles of contemporary Nigerian poets including Dami Ajayi, JK Anowe, Pelumi Salako, Jide Badmus, Nome Patrick, amongst many others. The anthology has been recognized as an important contribution to Nigerian and African literary scholarship.

=== Community building and mentorship ===
Agarau is a member of the UnSerious Collective, a fellowship program supporting emerging Nigerian writers. He co-founded Poetry Sango-Ota, a platform dedicated to mentoring emerging Nigerian poets through workshops and literary programs.

He founded The Arole Agarawu International Poetry Prize for African Writers, an initiative aimed at recognizing and supporting African poets. The prize is named after his grandfather, Alhaji Arole Agarawu, an uncredited West African songwriter and composer, connecting contemporary African literary practice with musical and oral traditions.

== Awards and recognition ==
Agarau has received numerous awards and honors recognizing his contributions to poetry and African literature:

- Winner, The Future Awards Africa Prize for Literature (2025)
- Winner, C.P. Cavafy Poetry Prize (2024) for "Halloween, Iowa"
- Winner, Poetic Justice Institute Editor's Prize for BIPOC Writers (2023-24) for The Years of Blood
- Finalist, Ruth Lilly-Rosenberg Fellowship (2024)
- Shortlisted, Wales International Poetry Prize (2024)
- Finalist, Sillerman First Book Prize for African Poets (2021, 2023)
- Shortlisted, Brunel African Poetry Prize (2022)
- Stanley Award for International Research, University of Iowa (2022)
- Robert Hayden Fellowship (2022)
- Winner, Frontier Poetry Industry Prize, 3rd Place (2020)
- Longlist, Emerging Poet Prize, Palette Poetry (2020)
- First Runner-Up, SEVHAGE/Angya Poetry Prize (2019)
- Shortlisted, Babishai Niwe Poetry Prize (2018)
- Winner, Eriata Oribhabor Poetry Prize (2017)

== Bibliography ==
=== Full-length collections ===
- The Years of Blood (Fordham University Press, 2025) ISBN 978-1531511616

=== Chapbooks ===
- For Boys Who Went (Self-published, 2016)
- The Arrival of Rain (Vegetarian Alcoholic Press, 2020)
- The Origin of Name (African Poetry Book Fund, 2020)

=== As editor ===
- Memento: An Anthology of Contemporary Nigerian Poetry (2020)

== See also ==
- Nigerian literature
- African poetry
- Cave Canem Foundation
- Iowa Writers' Workshop
