= Mboko God =

Studio album by Jovi
- Released: May 20, 2015
- Recorded: Yaoundé, Cameroon
- Studio: New Bell Music Studios
- Genre: Mboko
- Languages: Pidgin English, French, English
- Label: New Bell Music
- Producer: Le Monstre

Mboko God is the second full-length studio album by Cameroonian rapper and producer Jovi, released May 20, 2015. Entirely self-produced under his producer alias, "Le Monstre", Jovi composed, recorded, and mixed the album in Yaoundé, Cameroon.

== Composition ==
Mboko God is a multilingual album with Jovi rapping in English, French, and Pidgin, and also features appearances by artists who sing/rap in Ngemba, Douala, and Limbum dialects. Mboko God incorporates musical genres such as Cameroon's Bend Skin, Bikutsi, Makossa, Essewe, and Bottle Dance; Congolese Soukous and other influences across Africa; and electronic, hip hop, industrial, and other Western influences; creating a sound he refers to as "Mboko." Jovi's sound has also been described as combining trap bass and heavy snares with traditional Cameroonian sounds.

== Critical reception ==
Jeune Afrique called Mboko God an "essential album" and "probably one of the best rap albums in recent years."(translated) Je Wanda magazine described the first track on the album "Mboko God (Positioning)" as a "true celebration of African musical identity and its traditions."(translated) After releasing three videos off the album ("B.A.S.T.A.R.D", "Cash (Mets l'argent à Terre)" and "Et P8 Koi"), Jovi was nominated for a 2015 MTV Africa Music Award (MAMA) for Best Francophone artist, and Mboko God was nominated for a 2016 Kora Award for Best Album.

== Track listing ==
No.	Title	Writer(s)	Producer(s)	Length
1.	"Mboko God (Positioning) [feat. Reniss, Shey & Tilla]"	Ndukong Godlove, Kien Rennise Nde, Shey, Tilla	Le Monstre	5:47
2.	"Nyongo Money"	Ndukong Godlove, Abracadabra	Le Monstre	3:51
3.	"B.A.S.T.A.R.D (feat. Reniss)"	Ndukong Godlove, Kien Rennise	Le Monstre	3:16
4.	"Beat Tape Sessions (feat. Tilla, Teddy Doherty, Pascal, & Inna Money)"	Ndukong Godlove, Tilla, Teddy Doherty, Pascal & Inna Money	Le Monstre, Chavez	5:28
5.	"Comme Moundi"	Ndukong Godlove	Le Monstre	3:53
6.	"Mboko God (Status)"	Ndukong Godlove	Le Monstre	3:46
7.	"Top Level"	Ndukong Godlove	Le Monstre, Kiloh	2:25
8.	"Cash (Mets l'argent à Terre)"	Ndukong Godlove	Le Monstre	3:01
9.	"Man Pass Man Part 2"	Ndukong Godlove	Le Monstre	3:22
10.	"Et P8 Koi"	Ndukong Godlove	Le Monstre	3:43
11.	"Jungle Book (feat. Shey)"	Ndukong Godlove, Shey	Le Monstre	5:02
12.	"Mboko God (Reality) [feat. Reniss]"	Ndukong Godlove, Kien Rennise	Le Monstre, Kiloh	4:34
Total length:				49:00
