= The Lagos Review =

Nigerian literary magazine

- Official logo
- Categories: Book review, music review, news
- Frequency: Weekly
- Format: Online
- Founder: Toni Kan; Dami Ajayi
- Founded: 2019
- First issue: 1 September 2019; 7 years ago
- Country: Nigeria
- Based in: Lagos
- Language: English
- Website: thelagosreview.ng

The Lagos Review is a Nigerian literary magazine based in Lagos. It was founded by Toni Kan and Dami Ajayi in 2019.

== History ==
The Lagos Review was officially launched in September 2019, founded by Nigerian writer Toni Kan and poet Dami Ajayi. According to Kan, The Lagos Review was started because he "wanted something that is a bit more magazine-like" after exiting The Sun as the art writer.
