= Johnnie MacViban =

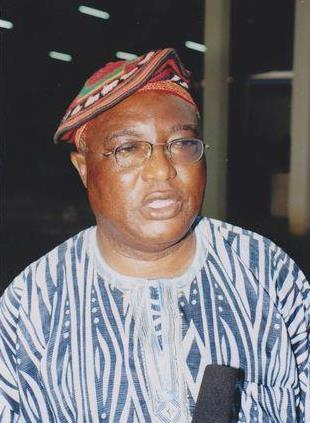
- Born: 1955 27 July
- Occupations: Writer, Poet, Journalist and Teacher
- Writing career
- Genres: Poetry, Fiction, Journalism
- Literary movement: Modernism, Postmodernism

Johnnie MacViban (born 1955) is a Cameroonian journalist, poet and novelist educated in the International School of Journalism and the International Communication Institute, Montreal (Canada).

== Life and career ==
As a news analyst, he has worked with Cameroon Tribune and Cameroon Radio Television and was incarcerated on 26 July 1986 alongside Sam Nuvalla Fonkem and Ebssy Ngum for airing over the radio a story on multi-party politics titled The Enemies of Democracy on Cameroon Calling. They were later released five months later in November of the same year.

In 1994, he won the Editor’s Choice Award in Poetry for the National Library of Poetry and his novel A Ripple from Abakwa was shortlisted for EduART's Jane and Rufus Blanshard Award for fiction.

== Bibliography ==
- An Anecdoted View. Yaounde: Subsidy, 2004.
- An Anecdoted Patchwork. Garoua: Subsidy, 2006.
- The Makuru Alternative. Bamenda: Patron Publishing House, 2007.
- A Ripple from Abakwa. Bamenda: Patron Publishing House, 2008.
- The Mwalimu’s Reader (A Collection of Critical Journalistic Essays). Kansas: Miraclaire, 2011.
- Twilight of Crooks. Yaounde: Bakwa Books, 2021. ISBN 978-1-7337526-3-3

=== Essays and articles ===
- “Low Ebb for Cameroon Cinema" Bakwa magazine, December 2011.
