= Uche Okpa-Iroha =

Nigerian multidisciplinary artist (born 1972)

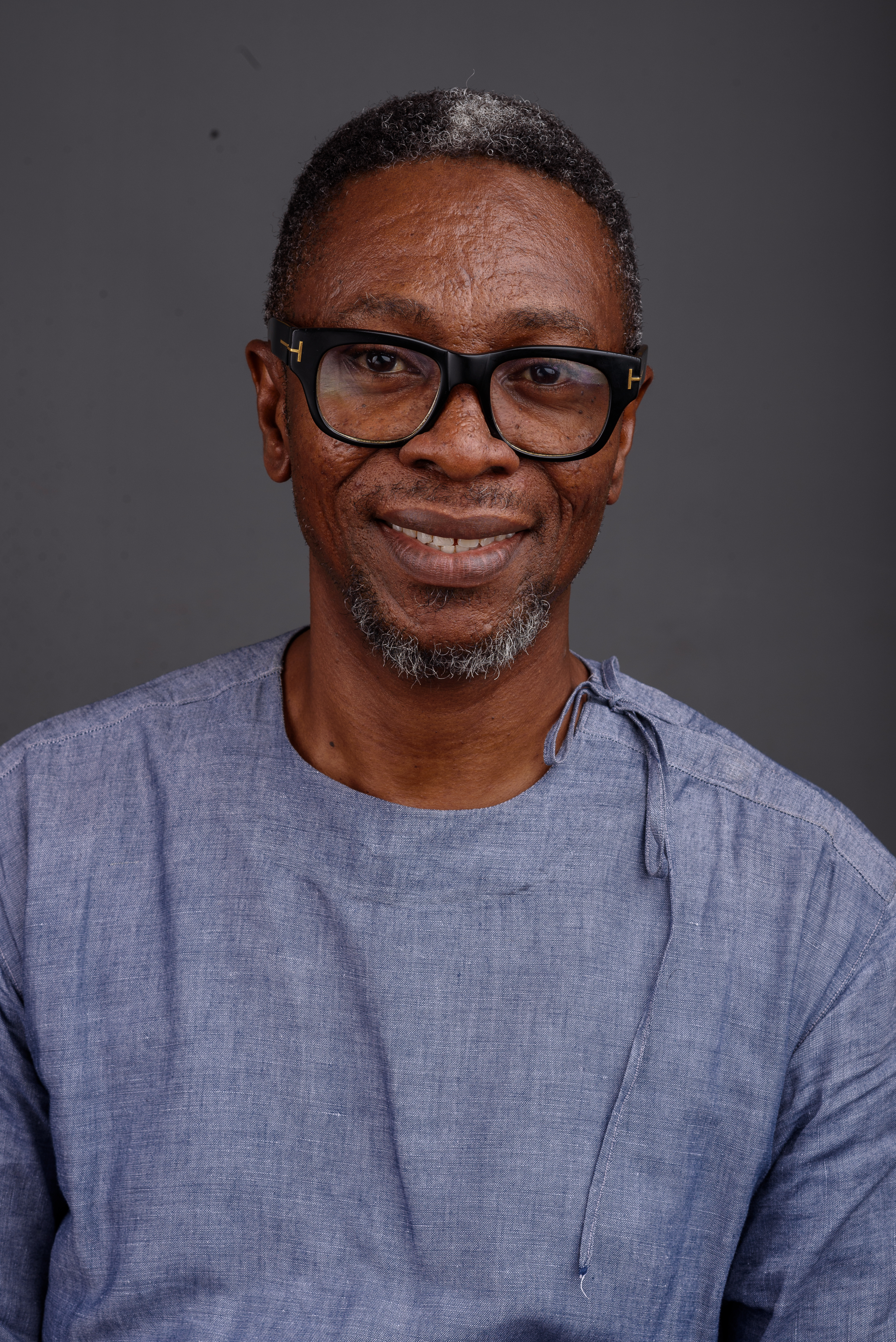
- Uche Okpa-Iroha in 2019
- Born: January 2, 1972 (age 54); Enugu, Nigeria
- Education: Federal University of Technology, Owerri
- Occupation: Artist
- Notable work: The Plantation Boy Series
- Awards: Seydou Keita Prize

Uche Okpa-Iroha (born in Enugu in 1972) is a Nigerian multidisciplinary artist who mainly adopts photography as his preferred medium of artistic expression.

He is a founding member of the Blackbox Collective and Invisible Borders Trans-African Organisation and in 2013, he founded and established The Nlele Institute, where he serves as Director.

He is a two-time winner of the Seydou Keita Prize for photography, and he has also won the Jean-Paul Blachere prize. He currently lives and works in Lagos.

== Personal life and education ==
Uche Okpa-Iroha was born on January 2, 1972, to Mr. Nwokocha Okpa-Iroha and Mrs. Chidi Okpa-Iroha. He has four other siblings. The family hails from Abia State in the South Eastern Niger Delta area of Nigeria. Okpa-Iroha is married to Ayo Joy Okpa-Iroha and they have two children.

Uche Okpa-Iroha holds a bachelor's degree in Food Science and Technology from the Federal University of Technology, Owerri, Imo State, Nigeria which he completed in 1997.

In 2013, he completed a two-year research residency and fellowship programme at the Rijksakademie in the Netherlands.

== Artistic style ==
Uche Okpa-Iroha is multidisciplinary, his preference for photography and photojournalism as his preferred mediums is evident in his body of work. His works reflect the diversity and uniqueness of African communities. His contributions to the development of African photography have been inspired by his belief that representation and identity are some of the core issues hampering the development of African photography, based on the influence of stereotypes passed on from periods of colonized ruling. This informs his approach to his work, where he explores both intrinsic and extrinsic sources of inspiration to create various artistic expressions.

His visual art style is a fusion of his interest in humanity, his fascination for the variety and complexity of human conditions and the interactions of these elements within their domestic environment that form the everyday realities of the common man and how that shapes the narrative of his culture.

== Career ==
Uche Okpa-Iroha discovered his interest in photography in 2005, when he attended an exhibition hosted by the Nigerian collective Depth of Field (DOF) in London. He became a full-time professional photographer in 2006, having apprenticed under his cousin, the Prince Claus Laureate, Uche James Iroha. The following year, the Black Box Photography Collective was formed by Uche Okpa-Iroha and some friends as a community of photo-artistic enthusiasts. The group organized major exhibitions in Lagos, Nigeria and Havana, Cuba.

In 2007, Okpa-Iroha was announced first runner-up of the Life in My City Art and Photography competition, organized by the Alliance Franciase and Rokana Industries in Enugu, Nigeria.

In 2008, his first major project “The Under Bridge Life” was favorably received by critics and exposed him to international audiences. The project earned him the Seydou Keita award for the Best Photographic Creation at the 2009 edition of the African Photography Encounters in Bamako and in the same year, he received the Jean-Paul Blachere Foundation Prize for the same work.

In 2011, Uche Okpa-Iroha was one of 25 artists selected for a two-year residency research fellowship programme at the Rijksakademie Van Bleeldende Kunsten. The prestigious Rijskakdemie Van Bleeldende Kunsten, which was founded by King William III in 1870 provided Uche the platform for developing his talent on an international scale and further exposed his works to the international community.

He has been exhibited in various places including New York, Paris, Canada, Belgium, Spain, Germany, France and Berlin.

He was on the Panel of Nominators for WorldPressPhoto's Joop Swart Masterclass selection committee in 2016. He is also a member of the International Federation of Kidney Foundation

== Notable works ==
Plantation Boy (2012)

Completed during the final year of his residency at the Rijksakademie Van Beeldende Kunsten Amsterdam, the Netherlands, the 'Plantation Boy' series see Okpa-Iroha intervening in Francis Ford Coppola's 1972 film, The Godfather by isolating and appropriating forty original film stills from the seminal movie.

Through a process of digital reconstructions, the artist disrupts an iconic Hollywood image with the presence of an African man amongst the familial gangs of an Italian-American subculture. By meticulously placing himself in the frame of the images through strategies of reconstruction and reenactment, he addresses the politics of representation in western cinema that is marked by a striking absence of black bodies. He also challenges stereotypical and subservient representations of African identity by taking center stage within seminal and iconic scenes from the film to demonstrate 'the subjective representation of the presence of an omission' and as a representation of a deviant culture or race that was not originally there.

The title situates the work within the black and African quest for freedom and self-determination that arose in the slave plantation era and continues to impact the lives of black subjects globally. He won the Seydou Keita Prize for this Series in 2009.

ISOLATED (Series). (2011 — Present) ISOLATED is an ongoing series that Okpa-Iroha began in 2011, It showcases the pervasive informal modes of communication in cities, modes of text, unorthodox advertising and other modes of communication and displaying messages that are on the fringes of the spectrum. Most of the time these images exist as whims and are covered with other materials, as is very common in cities such as Lagos, something he calls the city's response to its having to constantly reshape its commercial geography, leading to the emergence of this novel, organic outlook alongside the dynamic urban language that it sprung. They are mostly in street corners, alleys, private residences, shops, church buildings, electric poles, and even on house lintels.

Under the Bridge Life (2009)

Under Bridge Life is a series of photographs that portray the "Life Under Bridge" in Lagos. It showcases the full-fledged ecosystem that thrives under the belly of Lagos bridges, which have become more than just shelters for thousands of residents. This is further enhanced by Lagos's idiosyncratic infrastructure of roads and bridges, the complex neural network that grows the 'Life' organically, even without planning or external support.

He won the Seydou Keita Prize for this Series in 2015.

== Selected exhibitions ==
- 2018 * The Plantation Boy: Omnibus Circus Exhibition, Hotel de Sauroy, Les Marais, Paris, France
- 2018 * The Plantation Boy: The 23rd edition of MIART, the International Fair of Modern and Contemporary Art in Milan
- 2018 * The Plantation Boy: Paris Photo, Grand Palais, Paris, France
- 2017 * Urban Cadence: Street Scenes from Lagos and Johannesburg, Gund Gallery, Gambier Ohio, USA
- 2017 * Afriques Capitales, La Villette, Paris France
- 2016 * Tear My Bra, Les Rencontres De La Photographie, Arles, France.
- 2016 * Dey Your Lane: Lagos Variations, BOZAR, Centre For Fine Arts, Brussels, Belgium.
- 2015 * 10th Bamako Encounters, African Photography Biennale, Mali
- 2015 * La Biennale di Venezia, 56th International Art Exhibition: All The World's Futures (Invisible Borders Group Exhibition), Italy.
- 2015 * Sights and Sounds: Nigeria at the Jewish Museum, New York, USA.
- 2015 * Finissage Videonale.15 Videonale In Lagos: Changing City – Shifting Spaces, Kunstmuseum, Bonn, Germany.
- 2014 * Sounds of Silence, CODA Museum, Apeldoom, The Netherlands
- 2014 * Phantasms of The Non-City | Lagos Photo Festival, FNB JoBurg Artfair, South Africa.
- 2014 * International Artist Initiated Exhibition at David Dale Gallery, Glasgow 2014 Commonwealth Games, Scotland.
- 2014 * Nigerian Centenary Photography Exhibition at the Bonhams, London, England.
- 2014 * Africa II - Devearts, Den Haag, The Netherlands.
- 2014 * The Plantation Boy, 1st International Biennale of contemporary arts, Cartagena, Colombia
- 2013 * Art Connect Films, The Plantation Boy, Tiwani Contemporary, London, England
- 2013 * GO-SLOW: Diaries of Personal and Collective Stagnation in Lagos, Skoto Gallery, New York, USA.
- 2012 * Tumble In The Sugar Grass, Galerie Sanaa, Utrecht, The Netherlands.
- 2012 * Ungovernables (Invisible Borders), New Museum, New York, USA.
- 2011 * Rijksakademie Open Studios, Amsterdam, the Netherlands.
- 2011 * Les Nuits de Pierrevert Festival of Photography, Pierrevert, France.
- 2010 * Under Bridge life: Exhibition of Bamako Encounters, Mali.
- 2010 * Under bridge life: Exhibition of Bamako Encounters, Johannes Burg, South Africa.
- 2010 * Under Bridge Life: Exhibition of Bamako Encounters, Brussels, Belgium.
- 2010 * Under Bridge Life: Exhibition of Bamako Encounters, Antwerp, Belgium.
- 2010 * 8th Bamako Encounters, Biennale of African Photography, Mali.
- 2010 * Uprooting the Gaze: Foreign Places, Familiar Patterns. Brighton Photo Fringe, Brighton, Great Britain.
- 2008 * Energy of the City, A CORA Exhibition, Lagos. Nigeria.
- 2008 * Loving Lagos, Exhibition, Berlin, Germany.
- 2008 * First Photo Africa Contest, Exhibition, Tarifa, Spain.
- 2008 * Paris-Lagos Exchange Project, Workshop and Exhibition, Lagos, Nigeria.

=== Group exhibitions ===
- 2014 * Sounds of Silence, CODA Museum, Apeldoom, The Netherlands.
- 2010 * The Idea of Africa (re-invented) #1 (Invisible Borders), Kunsthalle, Bern, Switzerland.
- 2010 * 10th Havana Biennial (Black Box Photography Collective Group Exhibition), Havana, Cuba.
- 2010 * Nocturnal Vibrations (Black Box Photography Collective) at the Goethe Institut, Lagos, Nigeria.

== Awards and honours ==
2022 — Callanan Excellence in Teaching Award (formerly Center Teaching Award)

2015 — Seydou Keita Prize — Best Photography Creation (The Plantation Boy)

2010 — Prix Pictet “Growth” in 2010 (Nomination)

2009 — Seydou Keita Prize — Best Photography Creation (Under the Bridge Life)

2009 — Jean-Paul Blachere Foundation Prize
