= This Is Africa =

English-language business publication

- Type: Newsmagazine
- Format: Magazine
- Owner(s): Pearson plc, via Financial Times
- Headquarters: London, England
- Circulation: 20,000
- Website: www.thisisafricaonline.com

This Is Africa is an English-language bi-monthly business publication owned by the Financial Times and edited in London. It examines African business and politics in a global context. This Is Africa investigates foreign policy towards Africa and tracks the rise of the African consumer. Adrienne Klasa was one of the editors of the magazine.

According to the magazine’s 2013 media pack, the readership circulation by job description is 25% Senior Government Officials, 24% Consultants and Intermediaries, 20% C-Suite, 20% Director of Policy and 11% Institutional Investors, while the regional readership breakdown is 25% Africa, 24% Americas, 23% Europe, 18% Asia and 10% Middle East.

== Features ==
This Is Africa focuses primarily on FDI business and political developments that impact on how Africa interacts with the world. It has regular sections on:

Name	Description
Legal Bulletin	a record of all the new and upcoming legislation that might impact on business concerns across Africa.
Development	a global perspective of development in Africa, including education, agriculture, healthcare and business.
Policy	a review of the latest government policy across Africa.
Perspectives	opinion pieces and interviews with Kofi Annan, Muhammad Ali Pate, Mo Ibrahim, Gordon Brown, Ban Ki-moon.
Reports	a series of in-depth reports conducted with WEF, the Rockefeller Foundation, the Technical Centre for Agricultural and Rural Cooperation ACP-EU (CTA), and the Brookings Institution on themes such as agriculture, development and education.
