= Jovi (musician) =

Cameroonian rapper

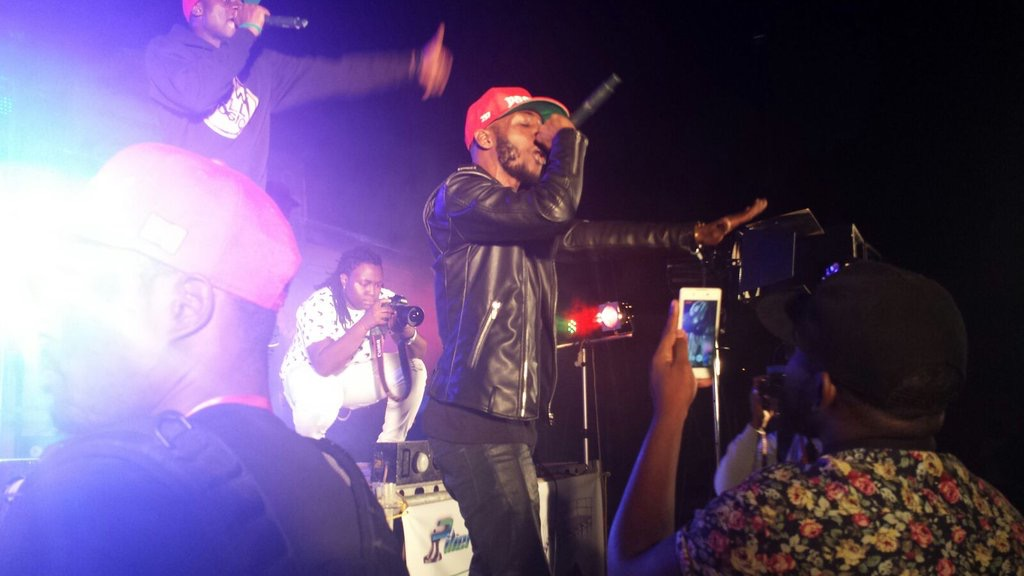
- Jovi performing at FK Fest, Yaoundé, on 12 February 2016

Background information
- Also known as: Le Monstre
- Born: Ndukong Godlove Nfor; 24 October 1983 (age 42); Douala, Cameroon
- Genres: hip hop, African hip hop, Mboko
- Occupations: Rapper, songwriter, performer, sound engineer, entrepreneur, record producer
- Years active: 2011–present
- Label: New Bell Music

Ndukong Godlove Nfor (born 24 October 1983), known by his stage name Jovi, is a Cameroonian rapper, songwriter, sound engineer, entrepreneur, and record producer (under the pseudonym Le Monstre). Jovi graduated from the University of Yaoundé II (Soa), with a BA Hons in Economics and Business Management.

Jovi's debut album H.I.V (Humanity is Vanishing) was described by Kangsen Feka Wakai in Bakwa magazine as "the long awaited arrival of a self-assured emcee very conscious of his abilities, the vacuum in the genre, his audience’s expectations, and the right dose of hustle to assert his place."

== Music career ==
Cameroon's music industry has remained conventional for a very long time with genres like Makossa and Bikutsi dominating the musical scene. Jovi's first single "Don 4 Kwat", which was followed by "Pitié", which featured Congolese musician Tabu Ley Rochereau was released under the Mumak record label that he co-founded and is part of a new wave of musical content in Cameroon. "Don 4 Kwat" received heavy airplay on Trace Urban and Channel O, and his second single, "Pitié" featuring Tabu Ley Rochereau, stayed on the charts for months on pan-African BBC’s Destination Africa hosted by DJ Edu, staying in the top 5 at its peak. In January 2013, Jovi left the Mumak record label to launch New Bell Music, with Rachel Burks. Both Jovi and Rachel are signed to their label New Bell Music.

In September 2014 Jovi released his video "Cash" (Mets l'argent à terre) to wide acclaim across Cameroon. In December 2014, Jovi released his video "Et P8 Koi," which became a hit across French-speaking West Africa, getting heavy rotation on Trace Urban, and debuting at No. 1 on Trace Urban's premiere episode of "Hip Hop 10 Made in Africa." In 2015, Jovi was nominated for an MTV Africa Music Award (MAMA) for Best Francophone Artist. On 20 May 2015, Jovi released his second album, Mboko God, which was nominated for a 2016 Kora Award for Best Album. Jovi's music videos are played regularly on Trace Urban, and in 2015, Jovi was featured on Trace TV in "The 15 Artists to follow in 2015," and "One of the 10 African Rappers You Should Definitely Know."

Under his pseudonym Le Monstre, Jovi produces his records and is renowned for his compelling fusion of traditional hip-hop and classic Cameroon/African sounds and instruments with new contemporary sounds. Jovi's lyrics are in English, French, Cameroonian Pidgin English, and FrancAnglais (a fusion of French, English, and Cameroonian Pidgin English). Jovi also produces music for artists in New Bell Music as well as for international artists. Jovi co-wrote and co-produced Akon's song "Shine the Light," which Akon released as a video on 26 January 2016. Jovi has been regularly featured in the online music magazine OkayAfrica. On 29 February 2016, Jovi was featured in an interview with The Fader, which featured the world premiere of his single "Bad Influence." In a Vibe magazine article published on 28 June 2016, author Natelege Whaley states Jovi is one of the African artists "flipping trap and taking it to new heights sonically."

Jovi has one of the biggest fanbases in Cameroonian music known as "MBOKO GANG."

Jovi's third album, 16 Wives, was released on 16 February 2017. On 30 June 2017 Noisey (the music branch of Vice) named Jovi's 16 Wives as one of "The 30 Best Overlooked Albums of 2017 (So Far). Jovi released his sixth EP Yaje Vol. 1: Black on 27 August 2017. Jovi is regularly featured in Apple Music playlists and was interviewed on Beats 1 Radio’s first African music show “A-List-African Music" on 16 December 2018. On 18 February 2019, Jovi released his 4th studio album God Don Kam.

== Discography ==
=== Albums ===
- H.I.V (Humanity is Vanishing) [2012]
- Mboko God [2015]
- 16 Wives [2017]
- God Don Kam [2019]
- 2035 [2023]
- Vendetta Vol 2 [2024]

=== EPs ===
- Kankwe Vol. 1 [2014]
- Kankwe Vol. 2 [2015]
- Raps 2 Riches [2015]
- Puta Madre [2015]
- Bad Music [2016]
- Yaje Vol. 1: Black
- God Di Kam
- Raps 2 Richs Vol.2
- YAJE Vol. 2: Sun Yellow
- Pressure [2021]
- Wlk D Tlk[2023][44]
- Bad Blood [2024]
- Vendetta Vol 1 [2024]

=== Mixtape ===
- Young Vizu Annointed Mboko Supreme [2021]
