= Pamela Tulizo =

Congolese (DRC) photographer

- Born: 1994 (age 31–32); Bukavu, Democratic Republic of Congo
- Education: Market Photo Workshop, Johannesburg
- Awards: Dior Photography and Visual Arts Award for Young Talents

Pamela Tulizo is a documentary photographer and journalist, born in 1994 in Bukavu in North Kivu, Democratic Republic of the Congo. In 2020, she won the Dior Photography and Visual Arts Award for Young Talents.

== Biography ==
Pamela Tulizo was born in 1994. She was raised in Goma, in the eastern region of the Democratic Republic of Congo. She is a journalist by training and a 2019 graduate of the Market Photo Workshop in Johannesburg. She was trained by the artist Martin Lukongo, and lived and worked in Goma until fleeing violence in the region. She now lives in France.

== Career ==
Tulizio began her career as a journalist before turning to photography as an artistic pursuit. Her subject matter raises awareness of Congolese women, their inner strength and resilience, despite the political, ecological, and economic instability of her region in Eastern Congo. Often seen as victims, particularly of sexual violence, the women from Goma she portrays in her photographs are clearly powerful individuals in the fight for social justice. In 2021, Tilizo used the money from the Dior award to create a cultural centre for women and girls in Goma, called Tulizo Elle Space.

== Exhibitions ==
Selective list

- 2019: Double Identité Lubumbashi Biennial
- 2022: Face to Face, Maison européene de la photographie, Paris, from January 21 to March 13
- 2026: Mababu-Spirit of the Ancestors, GC De Markten, Brussels

== Awards ==
- 2020: Dior Photography and Visual Arts Award for Young Talents for her series, "Double identity"
