= Bwesigye bwa Mwesigire =

Ugandan lawyer and author

- Born: Brian Bwesigye; 7 November 1987 (age 38); Kabale, Uganda
- Education: Bachelor of Laws
- Alma mater: Makerere University
- Occupations: Academic, Lawyer, Writer
- Writing career
- Genres: Fiction, Journalism, Non Fiction, Academic
- Subjects: Law, Literature, Politics, African Studies, African History
- Notable work: Fables out of Nyanja
- Notable awards: 2015 Harry Frank Guggenheim Young African Scholar; 2015 African Leadership Centre Peace and Security Fellow
- Website: furayide.wordpress.com

Bwesigye bwa Mwesigire is a Ugandan writer and lawyer, and the co-founder of the Centre for African Cultural Excellence (CACE), the organisation that curates the pan-African Writivism literary initiative. He is the author of a chap book, "Fables out of Nyanja", and a monograph, "Finding Foot as an International Court; The Prospects and Challenges of the East African Court of Justice".

His work has appeared in literary journals, anthologies and academic publications, including the Chimurenga Chronic, Uganda Modern Literary Digest, Saraba magazine, New Black Magazine, AFLA Quarterly, the Kalahari Review, Short Story Day Africa, The Guardian, The World To Come and African Roar, among others. He is a regular contributor to the Africa-focused blogs: This is Africa and Africa in Words. In 2015 he was recognised by the Harry Frank Guggenheim Foundation as a Young African Scholar and selected for the prestigious African Leadership Centre Peace and Security Fellowship for African scholars at King's College, London.

== Early life and education ==
Bwesigye was born in Kabale Hospital and grew up in Nyanja, in south-western Uganda, close to the border with Rwanda. He grew up with his mother, a teacher, at the staff quarters of the school where she taught. Bwesigye holds an LLB degree from Makerere University. He has in the past taught Human Rights at Makerere University and Uganda Martyrs University and Law at Busoga University, St. Augustine International University and Uganda Christian University.

His youth work has been recognised by the Konrad Adenaur Stiftung Youth Policy Think Tank for Policy Alternatives, British Council Global Change-makers, Harambe Entrepreneur Alliance, the United States Mission to Uganda Youth Advisors to Washington, Generation Change Uganda Chapter, the Mandela Institute for Development Studies and the Do School Theater Fellowship.

== Published works ==
=== Monograph ===
- Finding foot as an international court:challenges and prospects of the East African court of justice. Lap Lambert Academic Publishing AG & Co Kg. 2010. ISBN 978-3843371773.

=== Chap book ===
- Fables Out Of Nyanja. Kushinda. 2012. ISBN 978-0957142008.

=== Short stories ===
- "Europe is not a country" in, Patrick West and Om Prakash Dwivedi, ed. (2014). The world to come. Spineless wonders. ISBN 9780987447951.
- "Through the same gate" in, Emmanuel Sigauke, ed. (2013). African Roar 2013. StoryTime. ISBN 9780987008985.
- "Less is more", in The Kalahari review 2013
- "The Goat That Eats Meat", in Saraba, 2013
- "Spoiled town boy", in The New black magazine, 2012
