= Alejandro de la Fuente =

American academic

Alejandro de la Fuente is an academic and art curator. He is the Robert Woods Bliss Professor of Latin American History and Economics, Professor of African and African American Studies and of History at Harvard University. He is also Director of Afro-Latin American Research Institute at the Hutchins Center for African and African American Research at Harvard. His research focuses on specializes in the study of comparative study of slavery and race relations.

De la Fuente has curated several exhibits on race, serving as the author or editor of the corresponding publication: Queloides: Race and Racism in Cuban Contemporary Art (shown in 2010 to 2012 in Havana, Pittsburgh, New York City and Cambridge, Massachusetts); Drapetomania: Grupo Antillano and the Art of Afro-Cuba (2013 to 2016 in Santiago de Cuba-Havana-New York City, Cambridge, Massachusetts, San Francisco, Philadelphia, and Chicago) and Diago: The Pasts of this Afro-Cuban Present (Cambridge, Massachusetts and Miami, ongoing).

== Works ==
=== Books ===
- A Nation for All: Race, Inequality, and Politics in Twentieth-Century Cuba (University of North Carolina Press, 2001); in Spanish, Una nación para todos: raza, desigualdad y política en Cuba, 1900-2000 (Editorial Colibrí, 2001)
- Havana and the Atlantic in the Sixteenth Century (University of North Carolina Press, 2008)
- Becoming Free, Becoming Black: Race, Freedom, and Law in Cuba, Virginia, and Louisiana with Ariela J. Gross (Cambridge University Press, 2020)

=== Exhibit catalogues ===
- Queloides: Race and Racism in Cuban Contemporary Art (University of Pittsburgh Press, 2011)
- Grupo Antillano: The Art of Afro-Cuba (University of Pittsburgh Press, 2013)
- The Pasts of this Afro-Cuban Present (Harvard University Press, 2017)
