= Dami Ajayi =

Nigerian writer, poet, and medical doctor

Dami Àjàyí
- Born: Damilola Àjàyí; 1986 (age 39–40); Lagos, Lagos State, Nigeria
- Education: Obafemi Awolowo University
- Occupations: writer; medical doctor; critic
- Years active: 2006–present
- Known for: Co-founding Saraba
- Notable work: A Woman's Body Is a Country (2017)
- Website: damiajayi.com

Damilola Àjàyí (born 1986) is a Nigerian writer, poet and medical doctor who co-founded Saraba, a Nigerian literary magazine in 2008.

== Early life and education ==
Ajayi was born in 1986, at Lagos, Nigeria to parents of Yoruba origin. He attended Obafemi Awolowo University (OAU), Ile-Ife, where he studied medicine. While studying as an undergraduate at OAU, he co-founded Saraba Magazine in 2008, as well as The Lagos Review and YabaLeft Review, with writers Toni Kan and Tunji Olalere respectively.

Ajayi was featured in the two-part BBC Radio 4 documentary Writing a New Nigeria, and has been described as one who "writes about love like liquor that drowns a person into his or her feelings."

== Career ==
Ajayi first published his poetry collection Clinical Blues, which was shortlisted while still a manuscript for the Melita Hume Poetry Prize in 2012. It was eventually published in 2014 by WriteHouse. It was longlisted for the Wole Soyinka Prize for Literature in Africa in 2018, and was first runner-up for Association Nigerian Authors Prize.

In 2017, he wrote his second poetry collection, A Woman's Body is a Country, and was published by Ouida Books in Nigeria. Bernardine Evaristo praised Ajayi as one that "bravely exposes intimacies and his vulnerable self through poems that are honest and confessional.” Brittle Paper called it "an affection brewed by loss", and it was a finalist for the Glenna Luschei Prize for African Poetry in 2018.

His third collection, Affection and Other Accidents, was published in 2022 by Radi8 Book. It was described by Peter Akinlabi as "an audacious testing of the very limits of self-revelation", where "where the poet’s act of “practicing vulnerability” finds a most heightened articulation of love's complexities and contradictions, and OlongoAfrica describes as "a personal narrative of pain" with "the signature of his poetics by his deployment of accessible language and lapidary details of poems that cross into the poet’s personal life and everyday realities."

Between 2013 and 2019, he wrote critical reviews on Nigerian music and has interviewed musicians like King Sunny Adé and Adekunle Gold, Queen Salawu Abeni, Etuk Ubong, Adebantu, and Somi.

In 2024, The Sun describe Dami's music reviews and influences of poetry in his essays. The Sun stated that “What sets Dami Ajayi apart in the realm of music criticism is his dual role as a poet. This poetic sensibility infuses his writing with a lyrical quality, elevating the discourse beyond a simple evaluation of beats and lyrics. Ajayi’s reviews often read like nuanced compositions, where each word is carefully chosen to evoke the essence of the music he dissects.”

He was also one of the editors of the anthology From Limbe to Lagos: NonFiction from Cameroon and Nigeria, which was the result of a writing workshop held in Limbe for young African writers.

== Publications (selected) ==
=== Books ===
- Affection and Other Accidents (2022)
- A Woman's Body is a Country (2017)
- Clinical Blues (2014)

Chapbook

- Daybreak & Other Poems (Saraba Magazine, 2013)

=== Articles ===
- “Celluloid” in On Broken Wings: An Anthology of Best Contemporary Nigerian Poetry (New York, DLite Press, 2014) ed. by Unoma Azuah
- “Talk to Me” in Gambit: Newer African Writing (Stories & Interviews) (New York, The Mantle 2014) ed. by Emmanuel Iduma &amp; Shaun Randol
- "The Lagos Everyman"; in My Africa, My City: An Afridiaspora Anthology (Winepress Publishing) ed. by Tolu Daniel, Adeola Opeyemi
- “Old Peoples Home” Songhai 12: New Voices in Nigerian Literature (Port Harcourt, 2014) ed. by Molara Wood &amp; Lindsay Barett
- “A Playlist for Mr Ehikhamenor” for Daydream Esoterica (RELE Gallery, 2019)
- “Aubade to my Greying” in Memento: An Anthology of Contemporary Nigerian Poetry edited by Adedayo Agarau (America, Animal Heart Press, 2020)
- “Queens”, “Sleeping Beauty (of Borehamwood)”, “Waterstones”, “Ode to a Face Mask”, “Denouement” in Relations: An Anthology of African and Diaspora Voices edited by Nana Brew-Hammond.
