= Tade Ipadeola =

Nigerian poet

Tade Ipadeola (born September 1970 in Fiditi, Oyo State) is a Nigerian poet who writes in English and Yoruba. He is a practising lawyer. In 2013 his poetry collection The Sahara Testaments won the Nigeria Prize for Literature. In 2009, he won the Delphic Laurel in Poetry for his Yoruba poem "Songbird" at the Delphic Games in Jeju, South Korea.

== Early life ==
Tade Layo Ipadeola was born in September 1970 in Fiditi, Oyo State. He graduated in Law at 21 from Obafemi Awolowo University, Ile Ife. Both his parents were teachers: his father taught literature at Fiditi Grammar School and retired as school principal; his mother taught Yoruba and English. Ipadeola started writing very early in life and won a regional prize when he was in the final year of his secondary school.

== Literary career ==
After reading the works of J. P. Clarke and Christopher Okigbo, Ipadeola started writing poetry himself in 1990, and he says it took him 10–12 years of consistent practice to master the craft. His first collection was published in 1996. His second collection was A Time of Signs (2000). He self-published his third collection of poems, A Rain Fardel, in 2005. Ipadeola has also translated two classical Yoruba novels, by Daniel Fagunwa, into English: The Divine Cryptograph (Aditu); and The Pleasant Potentate of Ibudo (Ireke Onibudo), both in 2010, but they remain unpublished. In 2012 he translated W. H. Auden's first dramatic work Paid on Both Sides into Yoruba as Lamilami.
Ipadeola feels great poetry cannot be produced without discipline, consistency and patience and bemoans the lack of patience in the new generation of Nigerian poets. He says: "Remember that poetry is like a baby. If you force it to come to this world before term, you have [a] premature [birth] and you have problems; you have to get an incubator, you have to get a specialist, you have to get special foods, so the best thing is to allow the child to come to term before you give birth to it. Some things in life cannot be forced and poetry is one of them."

== The Sahara Testaments ==
His third volume of poetry The Sahara Testaments, which won the Nigeria Prize – the biggest literary prize in Africa that comes with $100,000 cash prize – is a sequence of one-thousand quatrains on the nuances of the Sahara. The jury chaired by Prof. Romanus Egudu called The Sahara Testaments "a remarkable epic covering the terrain and people of Africa from the very dawn of creation, through the present, to the future." It “uses the Sahara as a metonymy for problems of Africa and indeed, the whole of humanity. It also contains potent rhetoric and satire on topical issues and personalities, ranging from Africa’s blood diamonds and inflation in Nigeria…" It was also noted that "Ipadeola’s use of poetic language demonstrates a striking marriage of thought and verbal artistry expressed in the blending of sound and sense." Ipadeola’s work beat two other stiff contenders who made the final three, Ogochukwu Promise and Chidi Amu Nnadi, to clinch the prize. The poet Chiedu Ezeannah has observed that "it is like having Okigbo and Soyinka in one dizzying package".

Ipadeola has said that he would use the $100,000 prize money to build a library in his hometown Ibadan in honour of the poet Kofi Awoonor, who was gunned down by terrorists at Kenya's Westgate Shopping Mall in September 2013.

Ipadeola is the President of PEN Nigeria Centre. He lives in Ibadan with his wife and two children.

== Quotes ==
"I want to promote a legislation that a poem a day be read at every school assembly, whether the school is public or private. I want to actively campaign for a 1 percent dedicated public library fund at Local, State and Federal levels of government. The punishment for pilfering from that fund or for diverting it would be ten years imprisonment without an option of fine. I believe there wouldn’t be Boko Haram today if our founding fathers and mothers had done this at Independence."

"It is an odd phenomenon in human nature that those who were recipients of human kindness when it mattered most sometimes become the most virulent misanthropes."

His favourite quote: "Affection springs from nothing. Mere carriage of the head may seduce the heart and win it." —Mariama Ba, So Long a Letter
