= Toni Kan =

Nigerian writer (born 1971)

- Born: Anthony Kan Onwordi; 11 June 1971 (age 55)
- Education: University of Jos; University of Lagos
- Occupations: Writer, editor, public relations senior management executive, and teacher
- Notable work: Nights of the Creaking Bed

Anthony Kan Onwordi known as Toni Kan (born 11 June 1971) is a Nigerian writer, editor, public relations senior management executive, and teacher. He is author of the collection of short stories, Nights of a Creaking Bed, noted for exploring themes on African sexuality, and published by Cassava Republic Press (Nigerian publishers of writers such as Teju Cole). He also wrote The Carnivorous City. He was the winner of the NDDC/Ken Saro Wiwa literature prize, awarded by the Association of Nigerian Authors (ANA), in 2009.

Kan studied English literature at the University of Jos and earned an M.A. degree in English literature at the University of Lagos in 1999, graduating at the top of his class. He became a magazine editor at the age of 26.
