= Emmanuel Iduma =

Nigerian writer and art critic (born 1989)

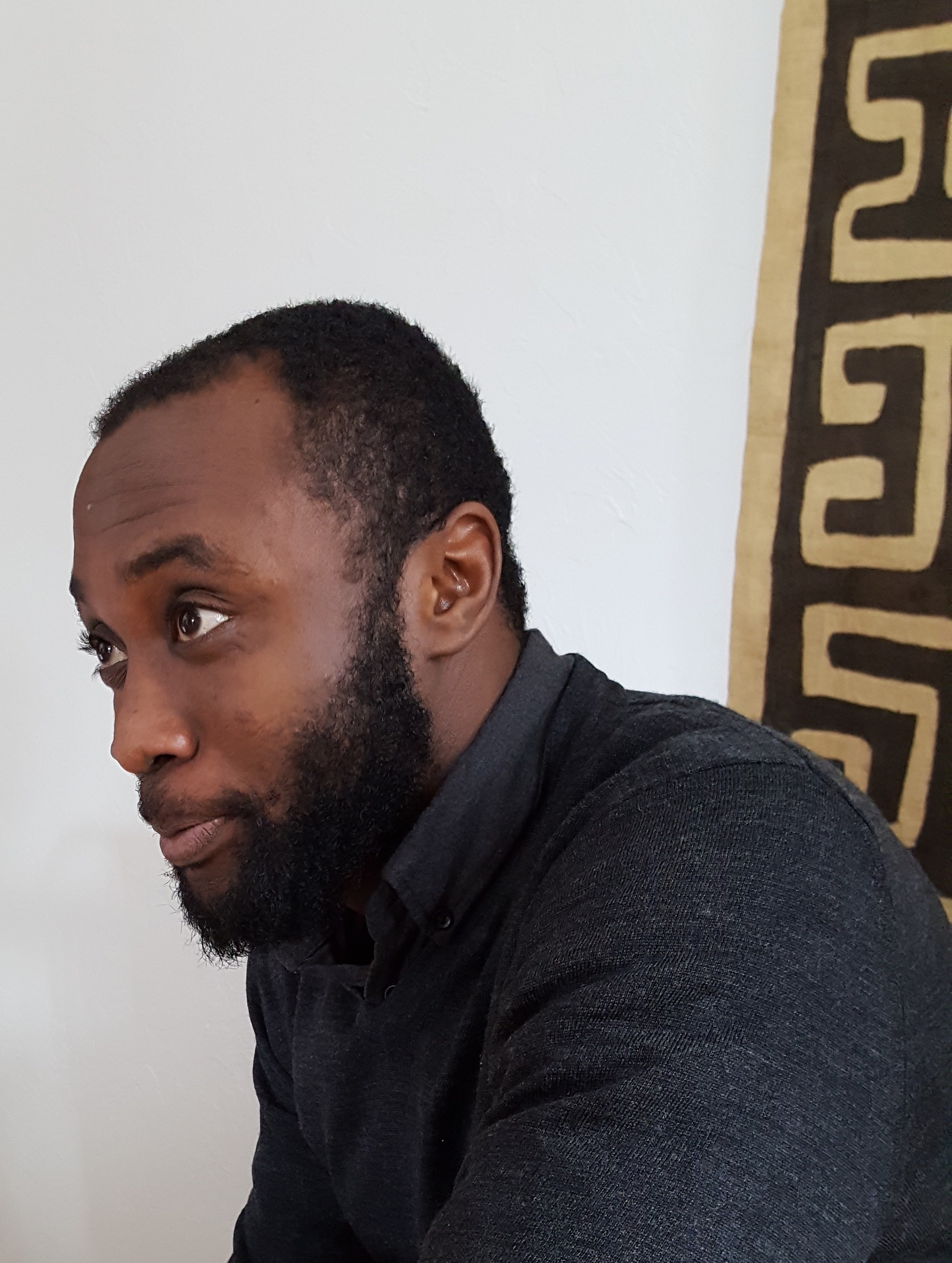
- Emmanuel Iduma
- Born: February 1, 1989 (age 37); Akure, Nigeria
- Education: Obafemi Awolowo University School of Visual Arts
- Occupations: Writer, editor, art critic
- Notable work: A Stranger's Pose, I am Still with You
- Spouse: Ayobami Adebayo (married 2020)
- Awards: Irving Sandler Award for New Voices in Art Criticism. Windham–Campbell Prize
- Website: www.mriduma.com

Emmanuel Iduma (born 1 February 1989) is a Nigerian writer and art critic. He is the author of A Stranger's Pose (2018) and Farad (2012). In 2016, Farad was republished in North America as The Sound of Things to Come. He was awarded the inaugural Irving Sandler Award for New Voices in Art Criticism by the Association Internationale des Critiques d’Art, USA.

== Personal life ==
Iduma was born in Akure, Nigeria, in 1989. He is married to Ayobami Adebayo, the author of Stay With Me.

== Career ==
Emmanuel Iduma studied law at Obafemi Awolowo University in Ile-Ife. He also has an MFA in Art Criticism and Writing from the School of Visual Arts, New York City.

In 2012, Parrésia Publishers published Iduma's first novel, Farad. It was described by Tolu Ogunlesi as "an impressive house of words – dream-like, haunting, elusive – standing confidently at a frontier, signalling the immense promise of an emerging generation of Nigerian novelists."

In 2017, he received an arts writing grant from the Creative Capital/Andy Warhol Foundation for a series of essays about contemporary Nigerian artists. During the same year, Iduma co-curated the first ever Nigerian Pavilion at the Venice Biennale with Adenrele Sonariwo

Iduma's 2018 book, A Stranger's Pose, was described in The Atlantic as "part travelogue, part memoir, part poetry collection, part photo essay", with the article going on to say: "The book hums with a kind of gorgeous melancholy. ...serene compositions—both written and photographic—transport the reader with a warmth that feels rare for a travel title. In its attention to visual detail and to the ebbs and flows of human connection, A Stranger’s Pose shifts conventions in travel writing about Africa."

A Stranger’s Pose was longlisted for the Ondaatje Prize in 2019.

Iduma's third book, I Am Still With You, a memoir about the Nigerian civil war, has been acquired by Algonquin in the US and William Collins, an imprint of Harper Collins, in the UK. It is scheduled for publication in 2022. The book is a recipient of a Silvers Grant for Work in Progress.

Iduma currently teaches in the MFA Art Writing Program at School of Visual Arts, New York City.

== List of publications ==
- Farad (2012)
- Gambit: Newer African Writing (co-edited, with Shaun Randol)
- A Stranger's Pose (2018)
- I am still with you: A Reckoning with silence, inheritance and History (2023)

== Awards and recognition ==
- In 2017, Iduma was awarded an arts writing grant by the Creative Capital/Andy Warhol Foundation.
- In 2018, his book, A Stranger's Pose, was longlisted for the Ondaatje Prize.
- In 2019, he was awarded the Irving Sandler Award for New Voices in Art Criticism.
- In 2020, Iduma was included in Apollo magazine's 40 Under 40 list.
- Windham–Campbell Prize (2022) category of nonfiction
