= Transition Magazine =

International magazine about race and culture

- Editor: Alejandro de la Fuente
- Categories: Political and literary
- Frequency: Two to four times per year
- Publisher: Indiana University Press for the Hutchins Center, Harvard University
- Founder: Rajat Neogy
- Founded: 1961; 65 years ago
- Country: United States
- Language: English
- Website: hutchinscenter.fas.harvard.edu/transition
- ISSN: 1527-8042
- OCLC: 890394318

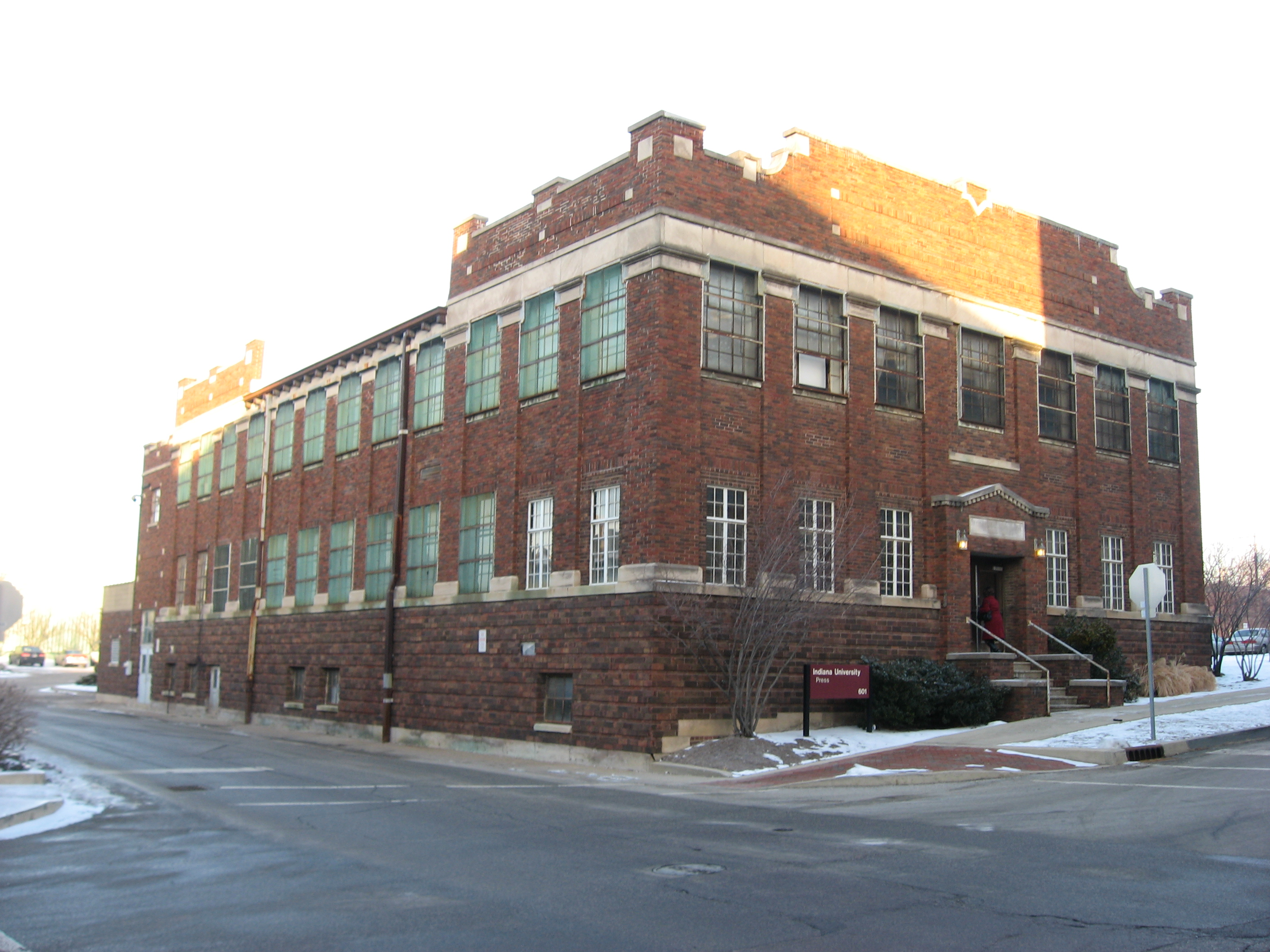
The headquarters of Indiana University Press

Transition Magazine was established in 1961 by Rajat Neogy as Transition Magazine: An International Review. It was published from 1961 to 1976 in various countries on the African continent, and since 1991 in the United States. In recent years it has been published between twice and four times per year by Indiana University Press, since 2013 on behalf of the Hutchins Center for African and African American Research at Harvard University.

== History ==
Upon his 1961 return to Kampala, Uganda, from studies in London, 22-year-old Rajat Neogy established Transition Magazine: An International Review. The magazine was partially funded by the Congress for Cultural Freedom, an anti-communist advocacy group whose ties to the Central Intelligence Agency were then unknown. Transition served as a major literary platform of East African writers and intellectuals during the Cold War. In 1962, Christopher Okigbo was appointed as editor of a West African edition.

In 1968, the Ugandan government jailed Neogy for sedition; the magazine had criticized President Milton Obote's proposed constitutional reforms. After Neogy's release, the magazine began publication in Ghana from 1971. Nigerian writer Wole Soyinka became editor in 1973, but in 1976 the magazine was forced to cease publication for financial reasons.

Henry Louis Gates Jr., previously a frequent contributor to Transition when published in Ghana, revived the magazine in 1991. Under his leadership, Transition evolved into "an international magazine about race and culture, with an emphasis on the African diaspora".

It is not clear when the journal was first published in the US, but since the Hutchins Center was established in 2013, it has supported publication of the journal.

As of 2020 the editor is Alejandro de la Fuente. Soyinka is chair of the editorial board, and Gates and Kwame Anthony Appiah are named as the publishers.

== Former editors ==
Former editors include:

- Rajat Neogy
- Wole Soyinka
- Henry Finder
- Michael C. Vazquez
- F. Abiola Irele
- Laurie Calhoun
- Tommie Shelby
- Glenda Carpio
- Vincent Brown

== See also ==
- Congress for Cultural Freedom – CIA program to fund anti-communist advocacy
