= Kwani? =

African literary magazine

- Cover for the October 2010 issue
- Frequency: Sporadic
- Founded: 2003; 23 years ago
- Company: Kwani Trust
- Country: Kenya
- Based in: Nairobi
- Language: English
- Website: www.kwani.org

Kwani? (derived from the Sheng slang "so what?") was a prominent Kenyan literary magazine headquartered in Nairobi. It has been hailed as "undoubtedly the most influential journal to have emerged from sub-Saharan Africa".

The magazine originated from discussions among a group of writers based in Nairobi during the early 2000s. Its inception was led by Binyavanga Wainaina, who initiated the project after winning the 2002 Caine Prize for African Writing. The inaugural printed edition was released in 2003.

Kwani? was produced by the Kwani Trust, an organization dedicated to fostering Kenya's and Africa's intellectual, creative, and imaginative resources through strategic literary initiatives. The organization received substantial funding from the Ford Foundation.

During its run, the magazine evolved into a significant platform for African continent literature and propelled the careers of various writers, including Yvonne Adhiambo Owuor, who won the 2003 Caine Prize; Uwem Akpan, acclaimed author of the bestselling short-story collection Say You're One of Them, and Billy Kahora, a former managing editor of the magazine. Each edition of the journal comprised over 500 pages of new journalism, fiction, experimental writing, poetry, cartoons, photographs, ideas, literary travel writing, and creative non-fiction.

Each volume of Kwani? revolved around a central theme. For instance, the seventh issue (2012/3), titled "Majuu" (a Sheng word meaning "overseas"), was "a 570-page testament to the journal's diasporic roots".

After the Ford Foundation changed its funding models in East Africa and ended support programs for arts and the media in 2014/15, Kwani? ceased publication.

== Kwani Trust ==
Kwani Trust is a regional literary organization and community of writers focused on fostering the development of the region's creative industry. Their efforts encompass publishing and distributing contemporary African literature, providing training opportunities, hosting literary events, and establishing global literary networks. The Kwani? Literary Festival is held biennially, gathering literary figures from Kenya and beyond to explore various topics through the lens of the continent's historical, current, and emerging literature.

== Kwani? Manuscript Project ==
The Kwani? Manuscript Project was initiated in 2012 as a literary prize aimed at recognizing unpublished fiction manuscripts from African writers across the continent and in the African diaspora. The project established a judging panel that included notable figures such as Jamal Mahjoub, Ellah Allfrey (deputy editor of Granta magazine), Helon Habila, Simon Gikandi, Mbugua wa Mungai (chairman of Kenyatta University's Literature Department), and Irene Staunton (associated with Weaver Press in Zimbabwe). On 12 April 2013, the project unveiled a longlist of selected manuscripts, and later in July 2013, the winner was announced as Ugandan writer Jennifer Nansubuga Makumbi. The runner-up position was awarded to Liberia's Saah Millimono for One Day I Will Write About This War, and third place was secured by Kenya's Timothy Kiprop Kimutai for The Water Spirits.

== Issue list ==
- Kwani? 01 (2003) - Showcased diverse narratives.
- Kwani? 02 (2005) - Explored contemporary Kenyan and African identity.
- Kwani? 03 (2006) - Highlighted urban life in Kenya.
- Kwani? 04 (2007) - Delved into post-election violence and reconciliation
- Kwani? 05 (2008) - Was themed around "Hustle" to focus on economic and social survival.
- Kwani? 06 (2010) - Addressed migration and the experiences of Africans abroad.
- Kwani? 07: Majuu (2012) - Explored the African diaspora.
- Kwani? 08 (2015)
