= A Season of Light =

2025 novel by Julie Iromuanya

- Author: Julie Iromuanya
- Language: English
- Genre: Literary fiction
- Publisher: Algonquin Books
- Publication date: 4 February 2025
- Media type: Print
- Pages: 256
- ISBN: 978-1-64375-551-9

A Season of Light is a 2025 novel by the Nigerian-American writer 'Julie Iromuanya. Published by Algonquin Books, it is Iromuanya's second novel after Mr. and Mrs. Doctor (2015). Set in Nigeria and the United States, the novel follows members of a Nigerian immigrant family whose lives are shaped by war, migration and loss.

== Plot ==
After the abduction of schoolgirls in Chibok, Nigeria, memories of the Nigerian Civil War resurface for a Nigerian immigrant family living in Florida. As past and present begin to converge, members of the family confront grief, inherited trauma and the lasting effects of displacement. Moving between Nigeria and the United States, the novel explores how personal histories shape relationships across generations.

== Writing and publication ==
A Season of Light is Iromuanya's second novel, published after Mr. and Mrs. Doctor. In an interview with Chicago Review of Books, Iromuanya said she wanted to examine the ways in which young people inherit the consequences of conflict, drawing connections between the Nigerian Civil War and the 2014 Chibok schoolgirl kidnappings. She described the novel as an exploration of memory, migration and the ways violence continues to shape later generations. Speaking to New Hampshire Public Radio, Iromuanya said the novel grew from her interest in family history and the enduring effects of war on individuals who never directly experienced it. She also discussed writing about immigrant communities, identity and the search for belonging.

== Reception ==
Cleyvis Natera writing for The New York Times, the novel was praised for its treatment of family, memory and migration, with the reviewer highlighting Iromuanya's portrayal of the emotional consequences of war and displacement across generations.

Kirkus Reviews described the novel as "an affecting, observant rendering of the immigrant experience in contemporary America", noting its treatment of intergenerational trauma and its depiction of the enduring legacy of the Nigerian Civil War.

In a starred review, Publishers Weekly praised Iromuanya's characterisation and narrative structure, describing the novel as "a beautiful tale of new beginnings". The review commended its exploration of grief, family and resilience, as well as its portrayal of the lasting effects of political violence.
