= 9mobile Prize for Literature =

- Awarded for: First Pan-African Prize for debut published writers
- Sponsored by: 9mobile (2017–present); Etisalat Nigeria (2013–16)
- Location: Nigeria
- First award: 2013
- Final award: 2018
- Website: literature.9mobile.com.ng

The 9mobile Prize for Literature was a literary award established by Etisalat Nigeria in 2013. It was the first ever pan-African prize for a debut African novel or short story collection. Awarded annually, the prize aimed to discover new literary talent on the continent and promote the African publishing industry. The winner received a cash prize of £15,000 in addition to a fellowship at the University of East Anglia.

The 9mobile Prize also sought to support publishers by purchasing 1000 copies of all shortlisted books. The books were donated to schools, book clubs and libraries across the African continent.

The award was initially named the Etisalat Prize for Literature. In 2017, Etisalat Nigeria was rebranded 9mobile and the award name changed accordingly.

== Entry and prize ==
The 9mobile Prize for Literature was directed at emerging writers of African citizenship whose first fiction book (of more than 30,000 words) was published in the previous 24 months. All genres were eligible as long as written in English or published in English translation.

The winner of the 9mobile Prize for Literature received £15,000 and a Fellowship at the University of East Anglia where they were mentored by Professor Giles Foden. The winner also was awarded a Samsung Galaxy Note, as were the shortlisted writers, and an engraved Montblanc Meisterstück. All of the finalists participated in book tour through three African cities sponsored by 9mobile.

The 9mobile Prize was overseen by a board of patrons composed of literary figures. These included:

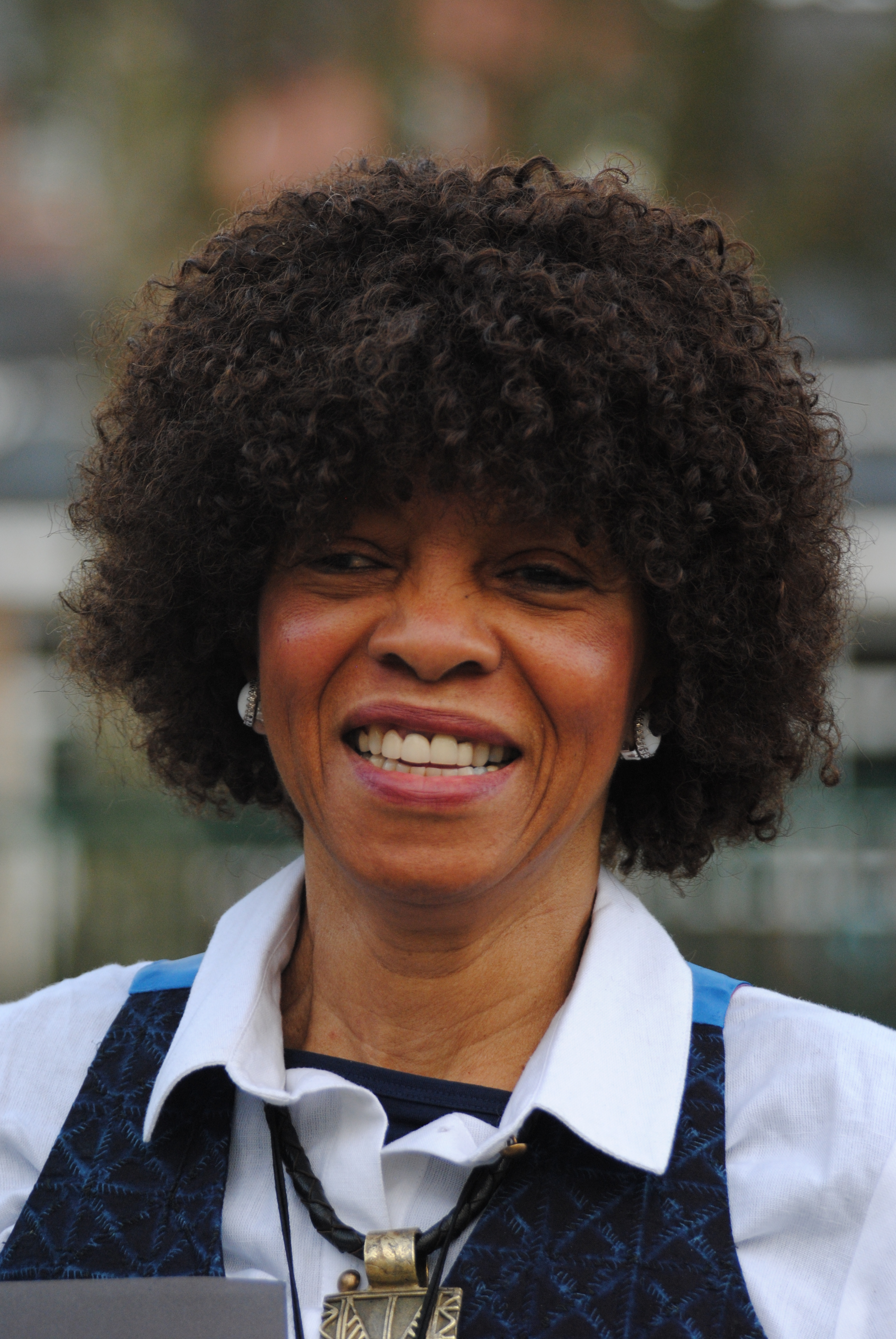
- Margaret Busby, Founding Patron of the 9mobile Prize for Literature
  Ama Ata Aidoo, writer, playwright and academic (2013–2018)
- Dele Olojede, journalist, winner of Pulitzer Prize (2013–2018)
- Ellah Wakatama Allfrey, OBE, editor and literary critic (2013–2018)
- Kole Omotoso, writer (2013–16)
- Margaret Busby, OBE, writer, editor and publisher (2013–2018)
- Sarah Ladipo Manyika, writer and academic (2016–2018)
- Zakes Mda, novelist and playwright (2013–2018)

== Award history ==
Blue ribbon = winner

=== 2013 ===
From a longlist of nine titles, the shortlist was announced on 23 January 2014. The winner was announced on 23 February 2014, and the award ceremony took place on Sunday, 2 March, at the Federal Palace Hotel, Lagos.

- Yewande Omotoso (South Africa), Bom Boy (Modjaji Books, South Africa)
- Karen Jennings (South Africa), Finding Soutbek (Holland Park Press, UK)
- NoViolet Bulawayo (Zimbabwe), We Need New Names (Little, Brown and Company/Chatto & Windus, UK)

The judges in 2013 were:

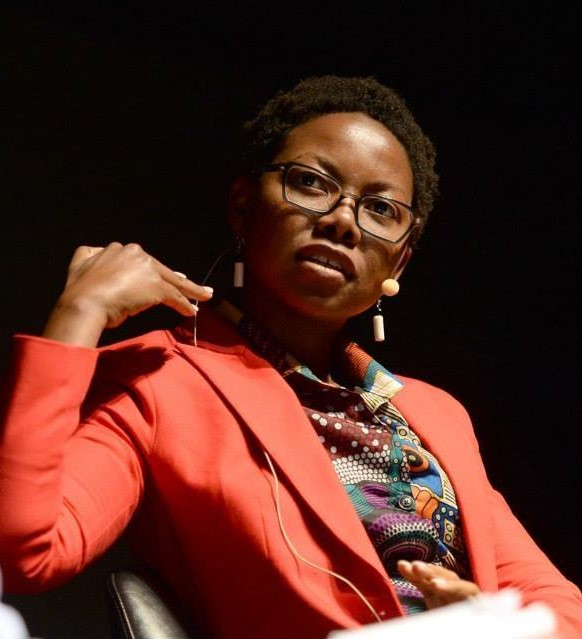
- NoViolet Bulawayo, inaugural winner of the 9mobile Prize, 2013
  Zakes Mda, novelist and playwright
- Sarah Ladipo Manyika, writer, academic
- Pumla Dineo Gqola, writer, academic
- Billy Kahora, writer, editor of Kwani?

=== 2014 ===
The longlist was announced in November 2014 and the shortlist in December 2014. The winner was announced on Sunday, 15 March 2015, at the Intercontinental Hotel Lagos, Nigeria.

- Nadia Davids (South Africa), An Imperfect Blessing (Random House Struik-Umuzi, South Africa)
- Chinelo Okparanta (Nigeria), Happiness, Like Water (Granta Books, UK)
- Songeziwe Mahlangu (South Africa), Penumbra (Kwela Books, imprint of NB Publishers, South Africa)

The 2014 judges were:

- Sarah Ladipo Manyika (chair)
- Alain Mabanckou
- Jamal Mahjoub
- Tsitsi Dangarembga

=== 2015 ===
The longlist was announced on 3 December 2015. The shortlist was announced on 8 March 2016, and the winner on 19 March.

- Penny Busetto (South Africa), The Story of Anna P, as Told by Herself (Jacana Media, South Africa)
- Fiston Mwanza Mujila (Democratic Republic of Congo), Tram 83, translated by Roland Glasser (Deep Vellum, USA)
- Rehana Rossouw (South Africa), What Will People Say (Jacana Media, South Africa)

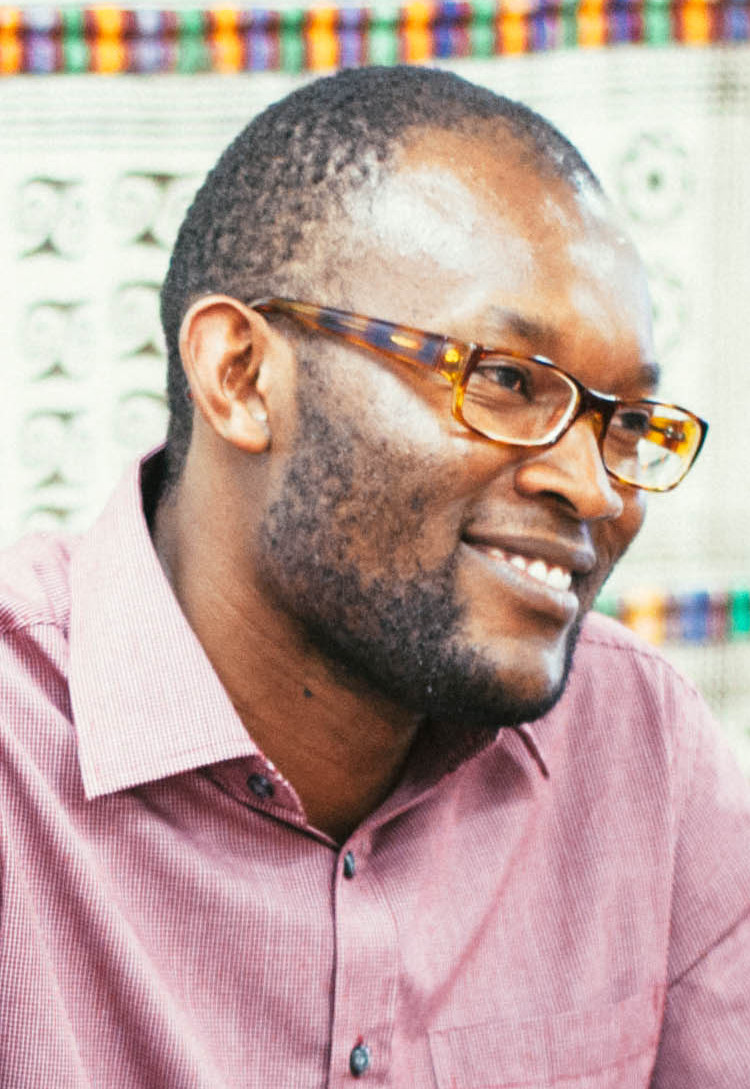
Fiston Mwanza Mujila, winner of the 2015 9mobile Prize

The 2015 judges were:

- Ato Quayson (chair)
- Molara Wood
- Zukiswa Wanner

=== 2016 ===
The longlist of nine titles was announced on 23 November 2016 and the shortlist of three on 5 January 2017. The winner was announced on 20 May.

- Jacqui L’Ange (South Africa), The Seed Thief (Umuzi Publishers, South Africa)
- Jowhor Ile (Nigeria), And After Many Days (Kachifo Limited, Nigeria)
- Julie Iromuanya (Nigeria), Mr & Mrs Doctor (Coffee House Press, USA)

The 2016 judges were:

- Helon Habila (chair)
- Edwige-Renée Dro
- Elinor Sisulu

=== 2017 ===
No award was given. In August 2017, the name of the literature prize was changed to 9mobile.

=== 2018 ===
The shortlist was chosen in January 2018 and winner announced on 8 August 2019,

- Lesley Nneka Arimah (Nigeria), What It Means When a Man Falls from the Sky
- Marcus Low (South Africa), Asylum
- Ayọ̀bámi Adébáyọ̀ (Nigeria), Stay with Me (Ouida Books)

The judges for the 2018 edition of the prize were Professor Harry Garuba (chair), Doreen Baingana and Siphiwo Mahala.

== Announcement of resignation of patrons ==
The founding patrons of the prize, which was established in 2012 as the Etisalat Prize for Literature, announced their resignation from the award in July 2019.

== See also ==
- Nigeria Prize for Literature
- Etisalat Award for Arabic Children's Literature
- Grand Prix of Literary Associations
