= Roland Glasser =

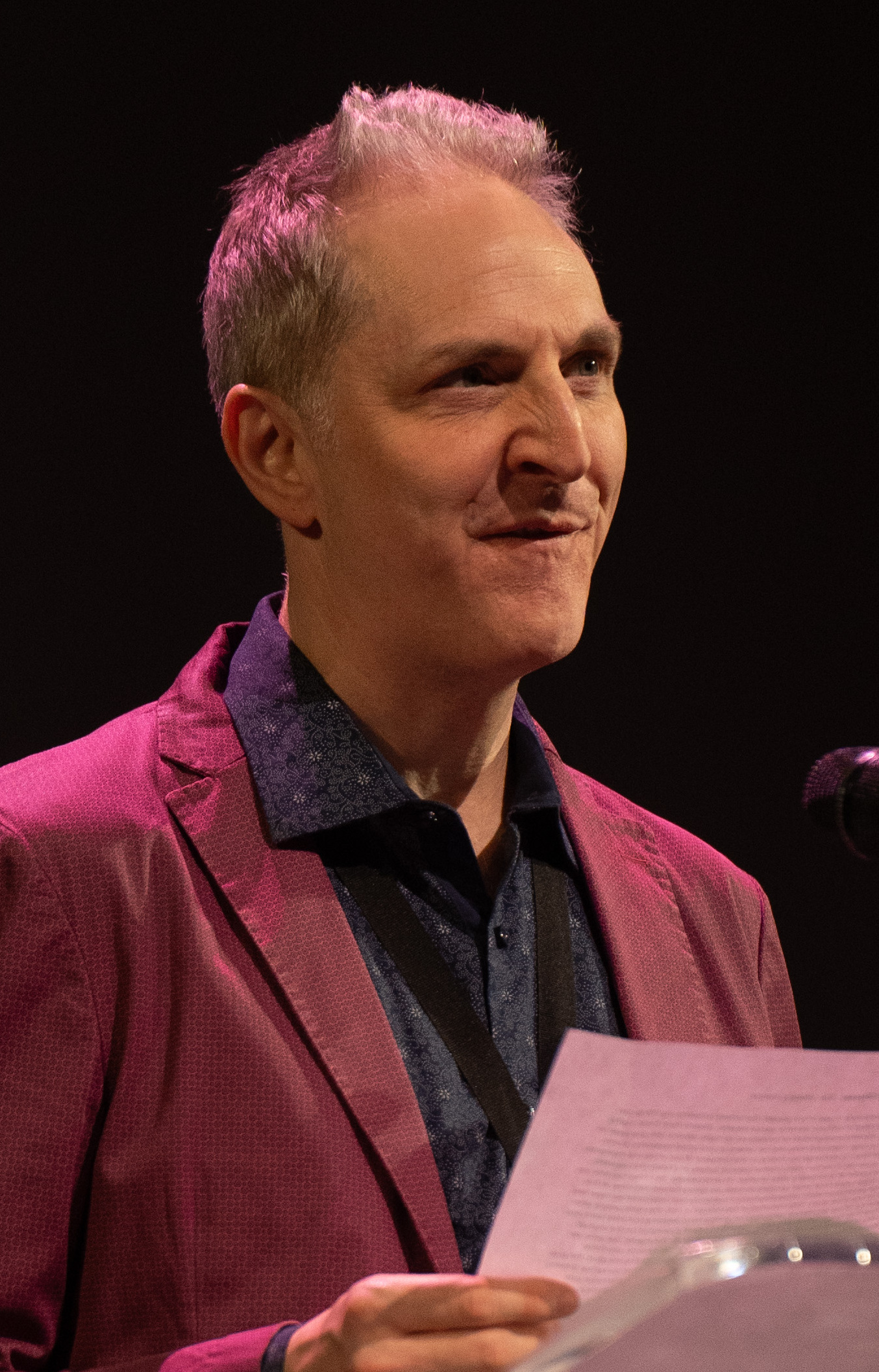
- Glasser at the 2024 National Book Awards finalist reading
- Occupation: Translator

Roland Glasser (born 1973) is a literary translator, working from French into English.

== Awards and honours ==
- Finalist, 2024 National Book Award for Translated Literature for his translation of Fiston Mwanza Mujila's The Villain's Dance
- Shortlist, 2021 Scott Moncrieff Prize for his translation of Adeline Dieudonné's Real Life
- Longlist, 2016 Man Booker International Prize and Best Translated Book Award for his translation of Fiston Mwanza Mujila's Tram 83 which also won the 2015 Etisalat Prize for Literature

== Translation work ==
Roland Glasser has translated a range of authors, including Adeline Dieudonné, Anne Cuneo, Martin Page (French author), Marc Pouyet, Stéphane Garnier, Julien Aranda, and Ludovic Flamant. He has also contributed articles and essays to The White Review, Asymptote, Literary Hub, Chimurenga, In Other Words, and the Fitzrovia and Bloomsbury Journals.

== Selected translations ==
- Dance of the Angels by Robert Morcet (AmazonCrossing, 2015)
- Tregian's Ground by Anne Cuneo (And Other Stories, 2015) - co-translated with Louise Rogers Lalaurie
- Tram 83 by Fiston Mwanza Mujila (Deep Vellum, 2015)
- Seasons of the Moon by Julien Aranda (AmazonCrossing, 2017)
- Real Life by Adeline Dieudonné (World Editions, 2020)
- The Villain's Dance by Fiston Mwanza Mujila (Deep Vellum, 2024)
- Henry Kissinger: An Intimate Portrait of the Master of Realpolitik by Jérémie Gallon (Profile Books, 2025)
