= Maskew Miller Longman Literature Awards =

South African writing competition

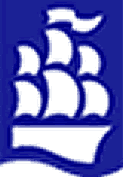

The Maskew Miller Longman Literature Awards were established in c.1980 by Maskew Miller Longman, an educational publishing company in South Africa. The competition was created to encourage writing in all of South Africa's 11 official languages, with a particular focus on literature suitable for a youth audience.

The genres rotate each year between novels, drama and short stories. It is the only competition to invite entries in all official languages. Past judges include André Brink, John Kani, Riana Scheepers, Andries Oliphant and Niki Daly.

== 2018 Youth Literature (incomplete) ==
Xitsonga
Winner: Musa Baloyi, Nyimpi ya Miehleketo

== 2017 Children's Fiction ==
Afrikaans
Winner: Alwyn Tredoux

English
Winner: Clare Houston

IsiXhosa
Winner: Zukiswa Pakama

Sepedi
Winner: Maledimo Winfred Moeng

Sesotho
Winner: Bongiwe Siphesihle Buthelezi

== 2016 (incomplete) ==
Xitsonga
Winner: Musa Baloyi, Vutlhari Bya Lunya

== 2015 Children's Fiction ==
Afrikaans
Winner: Jelleke Wierenga, Mensekind teen die monstervlieg

English
Winner: Bridget Pitt, The Night of the Go-away Birds

IsiXhosa
Winner: Sipho Richard Kekezwa, Icebo Likamalusi

IsiZulu
Winner: Emmanuel Nkosinathi Nazo, Imbewu Yomuthi Obabayo

Sepedi
Winner: Mabonchi Goodwill Motimele, La Fata Gal Le Boe Fela

Setswana
Winner: Thatayaone Raymond Dire, Ngwana Sejo o a Tlhakanelwa

Tshivenda
Winner: Tshifhiwa Given Mukwevho, Mveledzo na Zwighevhenga

Xitsonga
Winner: Conny Masocha Lubisi, Xixima

== 2014 Drama ==
Afrikaans
Winner: Cecilia du Toit, BFF

English
Winner: Charmaine Kendal, Doorways

IsiXhosa
Winner: Madoda Mlokoti, Inzala YamaRhamba

IsiZulu
Winner: Nakanjani Sibiya, Ngikuthanda ukhona lapho

Sepedi
Winner: Phillip Mothupi, Ga le batswadi ba selo

Tshivenda
Winner: Nekhavhambe Khalirendwe, Ganuko a li vhuisi tshalo

Xitsonga
Winner: Conny Masocha Lubisi, Ya Raha!

== 2013 Novels ==
Afrikaans
Winner: François Verster, Een teen Adamastor

English
Winner: Maria Phalime, Second chances

IsiXhosa
Winner: Zukiswa Pakama, Idaba likasithembele

IsiZulu
Winner: Mandla Ndlovu, Imfihlo ngujuqu

Sepedi
Winner: Jimmy Moshidi, Tahlego maleka

Sesotho
Winner: Lehlohonolo Mokoena, Mpho ya ka

Setswana
Winner: Richard Moloele, Itlho le le losi

Xitsonga
Winner: Connie M. Lubisi, Ndzhwalo

== 2012 Youth Drama ==
Afrikaans
Winner: Cecilia du Toit
Runner up: Braam van der Vyver
Runner up: Maretha Maartens

English
Winner: Karina Szczurek
Runner up: Mark Scheepers
Runner up: Richard Street

IsiNdebele
Winner: Cecilia du Toit
Runner up: Sovumani K. Mahlangu

isiXhosa
Winner: Athini Watu
Runner up: Sipho R. Kekezwa
Runner up: Sipho R. Kekezwa

IsiZulu
Winner: Mbongeni C. Nzimande
Runner up: Dumisani Hlatshwayo
Runner up: Jeffrey V. Gumede

Sesotho
Winner: Kgoeli E. Phlosi
Runner up: Morena S Tsie

Sepedi
Winner: Tebogo D. Maahlamela
Runner up: Martin K. Lebotse

Setswana
Winner: Letia J. Gabonnwe
Runner up: Othusitse M. Lobelo

SiSwati
Winner: Petras T. Jele
Runner up: Dumisani Magagula

Tshivenda
Winner: Hednar R. Tshianane
Runner up: Rudzani Mafhege
Runner up: Maswole Netshirando

Xitsonga
Winner and runner-up: Masocha Lubisi

== 2010 Children’s stories ==
Afrikaans
Winner: Jelleke Wierenga, "Kat in die pan vir die Fransman"
Runner-up: Carina Diedericks-Hugo, "Die Groenmambas en Shaka se spies"
Runner-up: Jelleke Wierenga, "‘n Bosluis red die koningshuis"

English
Winner: Gail Smith, "Bongani's Secret"
Runner-up: Pamela Newham, "Three Blind Dates"

IsiXhosa
Winner: Sivuyile Mazantsi, "Unyanelizwe"

Sepedi
Winner: Norman Mahlanya, "Kgetha Nna"

Xitsonga
Winner: Conny Lubisi, "Lembe Lerintshwa"

== 2009 Short stories ==
Afrikaans
Winner: Annami Simon vir die storie Johanna Magdalena "Matthee"
Runner-up: Jeanetta Basson vir die storie "'n Bed vir Johnny"
Runner-up: Fanie Viljoen vir die storie "Verneukkind"

English
Winner: Karen Jennings for the story "Mia and The Shark"
Runner-up: Jayne Bauling for the story "Dineo 658 MP"

IsiNdebele
Winner: Moses S. K. Mahlangu for the story "Amaberha2
Runner-up: Moses S. K. Mahlangu for the story "Incwajana necwadi"

IsiXhosa
Winner: Phakamile Gongo for the story "Itonga kaGugile"
Runner-up: Sipho Kekezwa for the story "Lelikabane eli Tyala?"

IsiZulu
Winner: Mandla Ndlovu for the story "Ungayithi Vu!"
Runner-up: Thabo Raboteng for the story "Kwasha"

Sepedi
Winner: M. P. Mathete for the story "Ke yo dula kae?"
Runner-up: M. P. Mathete for the story "Molato ke wa mang?"

Sesotho
Winner: Kgotso P. D. Maphalla for the story "Moetapele ke moetapele"
Runner-up: Kgotso P. D. Maphalla for the story "Yaba re emere eme"

Siswati
Winner: Mpumelelo N. Mkhatshwa for the story "Yangena intfombi lemhlophe"
Runner-up: Mpumelelo N. Mkhatshwa for the story "Kwaphela Emaphupho"

Tshivenda
Winner: Lufuno Ndlovu for the story "Ndo lovha nga dzi 22 Lambami 2004"
Runner-up: Rudzani Tshianane for the story "Vha sokou nadzo goo!"

Xitsonga
Winner: Conny Lubisi for the story "Rivoni"
Runner-up: Conny Lubisi for the story "Ndzi fikele"

== 2008 Drama ==
Afrikaans
Winner: Cecilia du Toit, "Boetie Beter Bester"

English
Winner: Charles J. Fourie, "The Lighthouse Keeper’s Wife"
Runner-up: Barbara Woodhead, "The Prize"

IsiXhosa
Winner: N. Tutani, Gawulayo! Gawulayo!

IsiZulu
Winner: P. F. Kekane, Isihlahla Sendlela

Sepedi
Winner: Aletta Motimele, Ditokelo
Runner-up: Mmathwane George, Morutisi wa Sejato

Sesotho
Winner: Teboho Letshaba, Ntshunyakgare
Runner-up: Teboho Letshaba, Lejwe la Kgopiso

Setswana
Winner: Kobelo Stephen Naledi, Maikotlhao

Tshivenda
Winner: Domina Napoleon Munzhelele, Bodzandala

Xitsonga
Winner: Conny Lubisi, Mangwa

== 2007 Novels ==
Afrikaans
Winner: Jaco Jacobs, Verneukpan
Runner-up: Francois Bloemhof, Stad aan die Einde van die Wereld
Runner-up: Braam van der Vyfer, Helpers uit die Kryt!

English
Winner: Dianne Case and Yvonne Hart, Katy of Sky Road
Runner-up: Mabonchi Motimele, The Boy with the Guitar
Runner-up: Becky Apteker, Written in Water

IsiZulu
Winner: M. M. Ndlovu, Amathonsi Abanzi

Sepedi
Winner: A. Motimele, Mepipi ka Moka e a Na
Runner-up: M. C. Mphahlele, Dilo Tsela ke Batho

Setswana
Winner: P. Tseole, Ke Go Jetse Eng?

Tshivenda
Winner: H. R. Tshianane, Vhuanzwo

Xitsonga
Winner: Conny Lubisi, Xijahatana
Runner-up: W. R. Chauke, Vito Ra Mina
Runner-up: Conny Lubisi, N’wina

== Illustrations ==
Winner: Lizette Duvenage
Runner-up: Dale Blankenaar
