= Maartens =

Maartens is a Dutch and Afrikaans language surname. It stems from the male given name Martin – and may refer to:

- Daniel Maartens (1995), South African rugby union player
- Jeremy Maartens (born 1979), South African former professional road cyclist
- Maretha Maartens (1945), South African author
- Meghan Maartens (1999), South African water polo player
