= Ato Quayson =

Ghanaian literary critic and academic (born 1961)

- Born: 26 August 1961 (age 65); Ghana
- Education: University of Ghana (BA); Cambridge University (PhD); Oxford University; Pembroke College, Cambridge
- Occupations: Literary critic and academic
- Notable work: Oxford Street, Accra: City Life and the Itineraries of Transnationalism (2014)

Ato Quayson is a Ghanaian-Canadian literary critic and the Jean G. and Morris M. Dolye Professor of Interdisciplinary Studies and English at Stanford University, where he is the inaugural chair of the Department of African and African American Studies. He was Chair of the Department of English from 2021 to 2023. He was formerly a Professor of English at New York University (NYU), and before that was University Professor of English and inaugural Director of the Centre for Diaspora Studies at the University of Toronto. He taught at the English Faculty of the University of Cambridge for a decade before moving to the University of Toronto. His writings on African literature, postcolonial studies, disability studies, urban studies and in literary theory have been widely published. He curates "Critic.Reading.Writing" on YouTube and is also host of "Contours: The Cambridge Literary Studies Hour" on Cambridge Core.

Quayson is a Fellow of the Ghana Academy of Arts and Sciences (2006) the Royal Society of Canada (2013), and Corresponding Fellow of the British Academy. He is also a Member of the American Academy of Arts and Sciences (2023). He was Chief Examiner in English of the International Baccalaureate (2005–07), and has been a member of the Diaspora and Migrations Project Committee of the Arts and Humanities Research Council (AHRC) of the UK, and of the European Research Council award grants panel on culture and cultural production (2011–2017). He is a former President of the African Studies Association.

== Education and career ==
Born in Ghana, Quayson earned his BA (Hons, First Class) at the University of Ghana and his PhD from Cambridge University in 1995. He went on to Oxford University as a Junior Research Fellow, before returning to Cambridge as a Fellow at Pembroke College and a member of the Faculty of English, where he eventually became a Reader in Commonwealth and Postcolonial Studies.

He was a Cambridge Commonwealth Scholar from 1991 to 1994 and is a Fellow of the Cambridge Commonwealth Society and has held fellowships at the W. E. B. Du Bois Institute at Harvard University (2004) and the Research Centre in the Humanities at the Australian National University (2015). In 2011–12, he was the Mary L. Cornille Distinguished Visiting Professor in the Humanities at the Newhouse Centre at Wellesley College. He has lectured widely in Singapore, Hong Kong, Turkey, Australia, Israel, and across Africa, Europe, and the United States.

In addition to writing and editing a number of books, Quayson has written essays for many publications, serving also on the editorial boards of journals including Research in African Literatures, African Diasporas, New Literary History, University of Toronto Quarterly, and Postcolonial Text. He is founding editor of The Cambridge Journal of Postcolonial Literary Inquiry and was chair of the judges for the 2015 Etisalat Prize for Literature. He also served on the board of the Noma Book Award (1997–2003), Africa's 100 Best Book Selection Panel (2001–2002), and several other literary juries and panels.

His book Oxford Street, Accra: City Life and the Itineraries of Transnationalism was co-winner of the Urban History Association's top award in the international category for books published in 2013–14. Quayson's most recent book is the 2021 publication, Tragedy and Postcolonial Literature which, in its examination of tragic philosophy from the Greeks through Shakespeare to the present era, deploys postcolonial literature to explore the links between suffering and ethics.

== Selected publications ==
=== Books ===
- Tragedy and Postcolonial Literature (Cambridge University Press, 2021).
- Decolonizing the English Literary Curriculum (co-edited with Ankhi Mukherjee; Cambridge University Press, 2023).
- The Cambridge Companion to City in World Literature (co-edited with Jini Kim Watson; Cambridge University Press, 2023).
- Oxford Street, Accra; Urban Evolution, Street Life and Itineraries of the Transnational (Duke University Press, 2014). Draws on a variety of concepts and disciplines such as anthropology, urban geography, literary theory, and spatial theory to retell the history of Accra from the perspective of a single street from the 1650s to the present day – the first such interdisciplinary study or urban life African urban studies.
- Cambridge History of Postcolonial Literature, 2 volumes, ed. (Cambridge University Press, 2012). The first attempt at bringing together essays dealing with the literary history of postcolonial studies, with 42 contributors covering a wide range of topics, divided equally between geographical topics (Postcolonialism and Arab Literature; Postcolonial Literature in Latin America; Canadian Writing and Postcolonialism) and thematic ones (Indigenous Writing in Canada; Orality and the Genres of African Writing; Postcolonial Auto/Biography).
- Aesthetic Nervousness: Disability and the Crisis of Representation (Columbia University Press, 2007). Focusing primarily on the work of Samuel Beckett, Toni Morrison, Wole Soyinka, and J. M. Coetzee, the book launches a thoroughly cross-cultural and interdisciplinary study of the representation of physical disability. The first book to fully bring Euro-American writers alongside postcolonial ones for a discussion of the ubiquitous trope of disability, it is now an acknowledged classic in the fields of disability and postcolonial studies, and chapters from it have been anthologised in various collections.
- Blackwell Companion to Diaspora and Transnationalism, ed. with Girish Daswani (New York: Blackwell, 2013). A volume that brings together for the first time essays dealing with both diaspora and transnationalism, normally kept apart in the literature. It clears the ground for seeing the two as mutually interrelated for the understanding of multi-ethnic liberal polities that have been shaped by the presence of diasporic communities.
- The Cambridge Companion to the Postcolonial Novel (Cambridge: Cambridge University Press, 2016)).
- Blackwell Companion to Diaspora and Transnationalism Studies (with Girish Daswani; New York: Blackwell, 2013).
- The Cambridge History of Postcolonial Literature, 2 volumes (Cambridge University Press, 2012).
- Labour Migration, Human Trafficking and Multinational Corporations (with Antonela Arhin; New York: Routledge, 2012).
- Fathers and Daughters: An Anthology of Exploration (Oxford: Ayebia Publishers, 2008)..
- African Literature: An Anthology of Theory and Criticism (with Tejumola Olaniyan; Oxford: Blackwell, 2007).
- Calibrations: Reading for the Social (Minneapolis: Minnesota University Press, 2003).
- Relocating Postcolonialism (with David Theo Goldberg; Oxford: Blackwell, 2002).
- Postcolonialism: Theory, Practice or Process? (Oxford: Blackwell, 2000).
- Strategic Transformations in Nigerian Writing (Oxford and Bloomington: James Currey and Indiana University Press, 1997). Seeking to trace Nigerian literary history from the perspective of a Yoruba matrix of cultural resources that informed the work of the writers in the title, the book fundamentally critiqued a by-then standard idea in the field that there was a natural relationship between orality and literacy in the work of African writers and rather argued that the presence of orality in African literature was due to the exercise of strategic aesthetic choices, some of which had nothing to do with orality but more to do with the pressures of identity-formation in the evolving nation-state that is Nigeria. The book has gone on to become a classic and is to be found in all African literature survey courses worldwide.
