= Holland Park (disambiguation) =

Holland Park is a district and a public park in the Royal Borough of Kensington and Chelsea, in west London.

Holland Park may also refer to:

- Holland Park tube station, a station on the London Underground
- Holland Park Press, a publishing house
- Holland Park, Diemen, a residential area located in Diemen, Noord-Holland in the Netherlands
- Holland Park, Queensland, a suburb located in Brisbane, Australia
- Holland Park School, London
- Holland Park, Surrey BC, a suburb park located in Surrey, British Columbia
