= Karen Jennings (author) =

South African writer (born 1982)

- Born: 1982 (age 43–44); Cape Town, South Africa
- Education: University of Cape Town (MA) < University of KwaZulu-Natal (PhD)
- Occupation: Writer
- Notable work: An Island (2020); Crooked Seeds (2024)
- Awards: Commonwealth Short Story Competition (Africa Region, 2010); K. Sello Duiker Memorial Award (2021)

Karen Jennings (born 1982) is a South African author.

== Early life and education ==
Jennings was born in Cape Town, South Africa, in 1982, the daughter of an Afrikaans mother and an English father; both of her parents were teachers. She has master's degrees in English literature and creative writing from the University of Cape Town, and a PhD in creative writing from the University of KwaZulu-Natal. She has done post-doctoral research at the Federal University of Goiás, Brazil, on the historical relationship between science and literature, with particular reference to eusocial insects. In 2022, Jennings was a postdoctoral writer-in-residence (Department of History) as part of the Biography of an Uncharted People Project at LEAP, Stellenbosch.

From 2023 to 2024, Jennings was a postdoctoral writer-in-residence as part of the Cape Panel Project at the Laboratory for the Economics of Africa's Past (LEAP), Stellenbosch University.

== Career ==
Jennings edited Feast, Famine & Potluck, a collection of African short stories, published in 2014 by Modjaji Books for Short Story Day Africa. Her first novel Finding Soutbek was shortlisted for the 2013 Etisalat Prize for Literature (now known as the 9mobile Prize for Literature). Her book An Island, written with support from a Miles Moreland Foundation Writing Scholarship, was longlisted for the 2021 Booker Prize.

Her novel Crooked Seeds was published across the world by Holland House Books in the UK, Hogarth Books in the US, Pan Macmillan India Picador India, Text Publishing in Australia, Masobe Books in Nigeria, and in South Africa by Karavan Press.

In 2025, Crooked Seeds was longlisted for both the Republic of Consciousness Prize and the Women's Prize.

In 2021, Karen Jennings co-founded the Island Prize with Holland House Books; the Prize is intended to enable debut African authors to find agents and publishers, emphasising the importance that "stories from Africa be given a wide variety of platforms so that they can be shared at home and abroad without the need to fit certain moulds." (Karen Jennings) With this in mind, Jennings also co-wrote Words on the Page, A Workbook for African Writers with Robert Peett of Holland House Books. The Workbook was designed with African writers in mind, and is a collection of resources, exercises, and discussions aimed at encouraging and developing the creative process.

Jennings runs regular writing workshops and currently lectures Creative Writing at North-West University, Potchefstroom.

== Short stories and essays ==
Short stories:

- Short story anthology: Away from the Dead London: Holland Park Press, 2014

Individual short stories :

- "Rangton of Bali” to be published in The Woven Tale Press in 2025.
- "Runaway", in New Contrast, December 2024.
- "In The Dust", in Isele: In the Dust | Karen Jennings – Isele Magazine, November 2024
- "The Incident", in One Life. Short.Sharp.Stories anthology, Cape Town: Tattoo Press, 2024.
- "Skeleton", in Lounloun: The Skeleton – lọúnlọún December 2024.
- "Vigilante", in Southword No. 47 in October/November 2024.
- "Panties", in In Other Words, edited by Kerry Hammerton; Cape Town: Karavan Press, 2024
- "Pegu" published by Libretto: PEGU | KAREN JENNINGS - Inspiring Creativity, Cultivating Excellence (librettong.com), July 2024.
- "The Translator", Afrocritik: The Translator | Karen Jennings - Afrocritik April 2024.

Essays published in 2024:

- "Waiting for Water": Waiting for water - LitNet
- "Without a Leg to Stand on": "Without a Leg to Stand On. Author Author Karen Jennings talks about the hobbling and oftentimes dull truth of the creative process", The Kalahari Review
- "Washing by Hand": Washing by hand: a brief look at Cape laundry since the 17th century - LitNet
- "Well, Yes, I Have a Dream": "Well, Yes, I Have a Dream…" | Karen Jennings | Essay (brittlepaper.com)

== Awards ==
- 2009: Winner English Section of the Maskew Miller Longman Literature Awards, for "Mia and the Shark" (short story)
- 2010: Winner Africa Region Prize of the Commonwealth Short Story Competition, for "From Dark" (short story)
- 2013: Shortlisted Etisalat Prize for Literature, for Finding Soutbek
- 2016: Longlisted Sunday Times Fiction Prize, for Travels with my Father
- 2021: Longlisted The Booker Prize, for An Island
- 2021: Co-winner K. Sello Duiker Memorial Award (one of the annual South African Literary Awards), for An Island
- 2022: Shortlisted Sunday Times Fiction Prize, for An Island
- 2025: Longlisted Republic of Consciousness Prize, for Crooked Seeds
- 2025: Longlisted the Women's Prize, for Crooked Seeds

== Works ==
- Finding Soutbek (Holland Park Press, 2013, ISBN 9781907320200) – novel
- Away from the Dead (Holland Park Press, 2014, ISBN 9781907320439) – short stories
- Travels with My Father: An Autobiographical Novel (Holland Park Press, 2016, ISBN 9781907320699) – novel/memoir
- Space Inhabited by Echoes (Holland Park Press, 2018, ISBN 9781907320774) – poetry
- Upturned Earth (Holland Park Press, 2019, ISBN 9781907320910) - novel
- An Island (Holland House Books, 2020, ISBN 9781910688922) – novel
- Crooked Seeds. Hogarth. 16 April 2024. ISBN 978-0-593-59712-5. – novel
- Crooked Seeds. Holland House Books. 16 April 2024. ISBN 978-1-7391047-2-6.)
- Crooked Seeds. Text Publishing. 16 April 2024. ISBN 9781922790675.
- Crooked Seeds. Masobe Books. 24 June 2024. ISBN 978-978-60488-2-6.
- Crooked Seeds. Karavan Press. 8 May 2024. ISBN 978-1-7764726-2-8.
- Crooked Seeds. Pan Macmillan Picador India. 16 April 2024. ISBN 9789361135743.
- Words on the Page co-written with Robert Peett (2025)
