= Jowhor Ile =

Nigerian writer

Jowhor Ile (born 1980) is a Nigerian writer known for his first novel, And After Many Days. In 2016, the novel was awarded the Etisalat Prize for Literature.

Ile was raised in Port Harcourt, Nigeria. His short fiction has appeared in The Sewanee Review, McSweeney's Quarterly and Litro Magazine. He earned his MFA at Boston University, and was a visiting professor at West Virginia University, dividing his time between Nigeria and the U.S.

His short story "Fisherman's Stew", published in The Sewanee Review (2019), was shortlisted for the 2020 Caine Prize, was a winner of the 2021 O. Henry Prize and was included in The Best Short Stories Anthology 2021, guest-edited and introduced by Chimamanda Ngozi Adichie.

Ile lectures in the Department of English & Creative Writing at Aberystwyth University in Wales.
