= Mr. and Mrs. Doctor =

2015 novel by Julie Iromuanya

- Author: Julie Iromuanya
- Language: English
- Genre: Literary fiction
- Publisher: Coffee House Press
- Publication date: 14 April 2015
- Media type: Print
- Pages: 288
- ISBN: 978-1-56689-397-8

Mr. and Mrs. Doctor is a 2015 novel by the Nigerian-American writer Julie Iromuanya. Published by Coffee House Press, it is Iromuanya's debut novel. Set in Nigeria and the Midwestern United States, the novel follows an arranged marriage built on deception as a Nigerian immigrant struggles to maintain the illusion that he has fulfilled his family's expectations of becoming a doctor.

The novel was a finalist for the PEN/Faulkner Award for Fiction, a finalist for the PEN/Robert W. Bingham Prize, a runner-up for the Etisalat Prize for Literature and was longlisted for the National Book Critics Circle's John Leonard Prize.

== Plot ==
Job Ogbonnaya, a Nigerian immigrant living in Nebraska, has spent years convincing his family that he is a successful physician in the United States. In reality, he has abandoned medical school and works low-paying jobs while trying to preserve the appearance of success. Returning briefly to Nigeria, he enters an arranged marriage with Ifi, who believes she is marrying a respected doctor.

After the couple settle in Nebraska, the lie that defines their marriage becomes increasingly difficult to sustain. Financial hardship, immigration pressures and family expectations place growing strain on their relationship, while Job's past, including a marriage entered into for immigration purposes, returns to threaten the life he has constructed.

== Writing and publication ==
Mr. and Mrs. Doctor grew out of Iromuanya's interest in migration, family expectation and the distance between aspiration and reality. The novel began with the character of Job, a Nigerian immigrant whose decision to maintain the fiction that he had become a successful doctor in the United States became the foundation of the story. As the manuscript developed, the focus shifted from the deception itself to its emotional and personal consequences.

The character of Ifi was introduced later in the writing process and became a counterpoint to Job's romanticised image of Nigeria. Iromuanya has said that the novel drew partly on people she knew while growing up and on her interest in the contradictions that shape immigrant life, particularly the tension between outward success and private struggle.

== Reception ==
In a review, Kirkus Reviews praised Iromuanya's debut, describing it as an accomplished portrait of immigration, family obligation and the pursuit of the American dream. It commended the novel's emotional depth and its portrayal of characters caught between cultural expectations and personal aspirations.

Publishers Weekly described the novel as a complex portrait of Nigerian immigrants negotiating identity, marriage and class in America. The review praised Iromuanya's characterisation and observed that the novel presents the immigrant experience with nuance and compassion.

Reviewing the novel for the Star Tribune, Ellen Akins wrote that Iromuanya explores the gap between the promise of the American dream and the realities faced by immigrants. She highlighted the novel's treatment of deception, ambition and the burdens carried by its central characters.

Writing for Wildness, Ilana Masad described the novel as an emotionally layered examination of marriage, migration and obligation. She praised Iromuanya's characterisation, particularly the development of Ifi, and noted the novel's portrayal of the sacrifices demanded by migration.

Awards and honours
Year	Award	Category	Result	Ref.
2015	John Leonard Prize	Debut fiction	Longlisted	
2015	San Francisco Chronicle Best Books of 2015	Best books	Selected	
2015	Star Tribune Critics' Choice	Fiction	Selected	
2015	Best Minnesota Books	Fiction	Selected	
2016	PEN/Faulkner Award for Fiction	Fiction	Nominated Finalist	
2016	PEN/Robert W. Bingham Prize for Debut Fiction	Debut fiction	Nominated Finalist	
2016	Etisalat Prize for Literature	Fiction	Shortlisted	
2017	Etisalat Prize for Literature	Fiction	Runner-up	
