= Fiston Mwanza Mujila =

Congolese writer (born 1981)

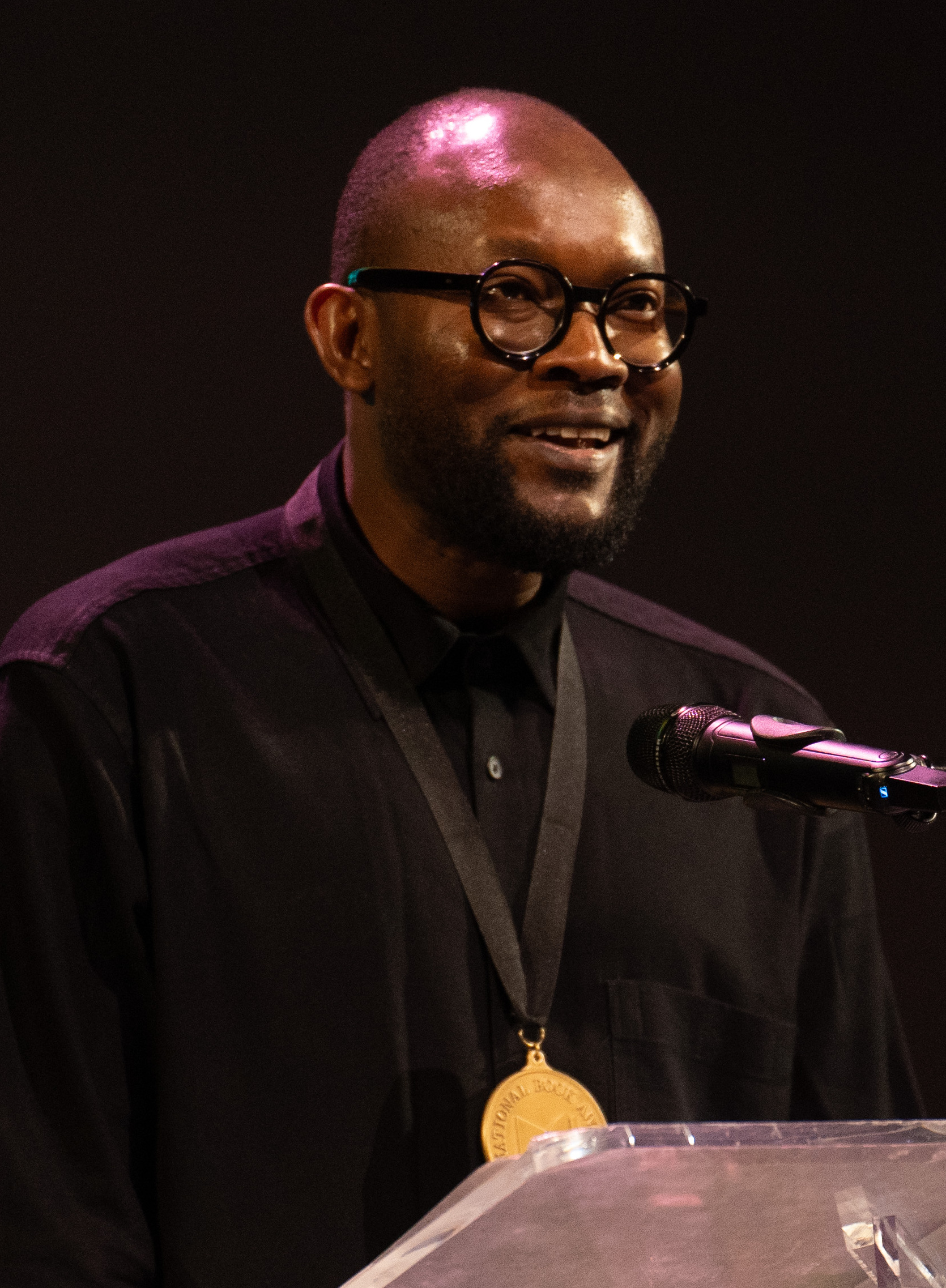
- Mujila at the 2024 National Book Awards finalist reading
- Born: 1981 (age 44–45); Lubumbashi, Democratic Republic of the Congo
- Occupation: Novelist
- Writing career
- Language: French
- Period: 2009–present
- Notable work: Tram 83 (2014)
- Notable awards: Etisalat Prize for Literature (2015)

Fiston Nasser Mwanza Mujila (born 1981 in Lubumbashi) is a Congolese writer. He lives in Graz, Austria, where he teaches African literature.

== Biography ==
Fiston Mwanza Mujila was the recipient of the gold medal for literature at the 2009 Francophone Games in Lebanon for his text "The Night".

In 2014, Mujila's debut novel, Tram 83, was published by Éditions Métailié to considerable acclaim. In autumn 2015, an English translation (by Roland Glasser) of Tram 83 was published by Deep Vellum Publishing in Dallas, Texas, and received widespread praise. This translation was also published by Jacaranda Books in the UK and Scribe in Australia and New Zealand. Other translations of Tram 83 have appeared in Italian, Catalan, Dutch, Swedish, Spanish and German. Mujila lives in Graz, Austria.

Mujila was awarded the 2015 Etisalat Prize for Literature on 19 March 2016 for Tram 83, the novel having earlier been announced on the longlist for the Man Booker International Prize, and awarded the Grand Prix of Literary Associations (Belles-Lettres Category) on 26 February 2016. He won the German International Literature Award for Tram 83.

In 2024, the English translation by Roland Glasser of his 2020 novel, La Danse du Vilain, was a finalist for the National Book Award for Translated Literature.

== Bibliography ==
- Le Fleuve dans le Ventre / Der Fluß im Bauch, poèmes, bilingual edn, translated into German by Ludwig Hartinger, published in Ottensheim an der Donau, Austria by Édition Thanhäuser, 2013, 114 pp. (ISBN 978-3-900986-79-7)
- Tram 83, Novel, Deep Vellum Publishing (Dallas), 2015, 224 pp. (ISBN 1-941920-04-7)
- Et les moustiques sont des fruits à pépins and Te voir dressé sur tes deux pattes ne fait que mettre de l’huile au feu, Play, Manage, Belgique, Éditions Lansman, 2015, 86 pp. (39 & 36) (ISBN 978-2-8071-0046-6)

== See also ==
- Grand Prix of Literary Associations
- Grands prix des associations littéraires
