= K. P. D. Maphalla =

South African writer

Kgotso Pieter David (K.P.D.) Maphalla (born 1955, South Africa – died 5 April 2021, South Africa) was a writer in the Sesotho language. An author of more than 40 books, Maphalla has received an honorary doctorate from the University of the Free State, as well as a Lifetime Achievement Award in Literature. Maphalla died on 5 April 2021 after suffering a stroke. He was laid to rest in Bohlokong, near Bethlehem on 14 April 2021.

Amongst his many books (not to mention radio plays,) are the following: Tahleho (drama); Tshiu tseo (novel); Kabelwamanong (detective novel); Botsang lebitla (novel); Tsie lala (poetry); Mahohodi (poetry); Dikano (poetry); Pinyane (poetry); Ditema (poetry); Fuba sa ka (poetry); Kgapha tsa ka (poetry); Seitebatso (poetry); Sentebale (poetry); A tale of two fathers (English novel); Mohlomong Hosane (essays/short stories); Bashemane ba Dibataolong (novel).

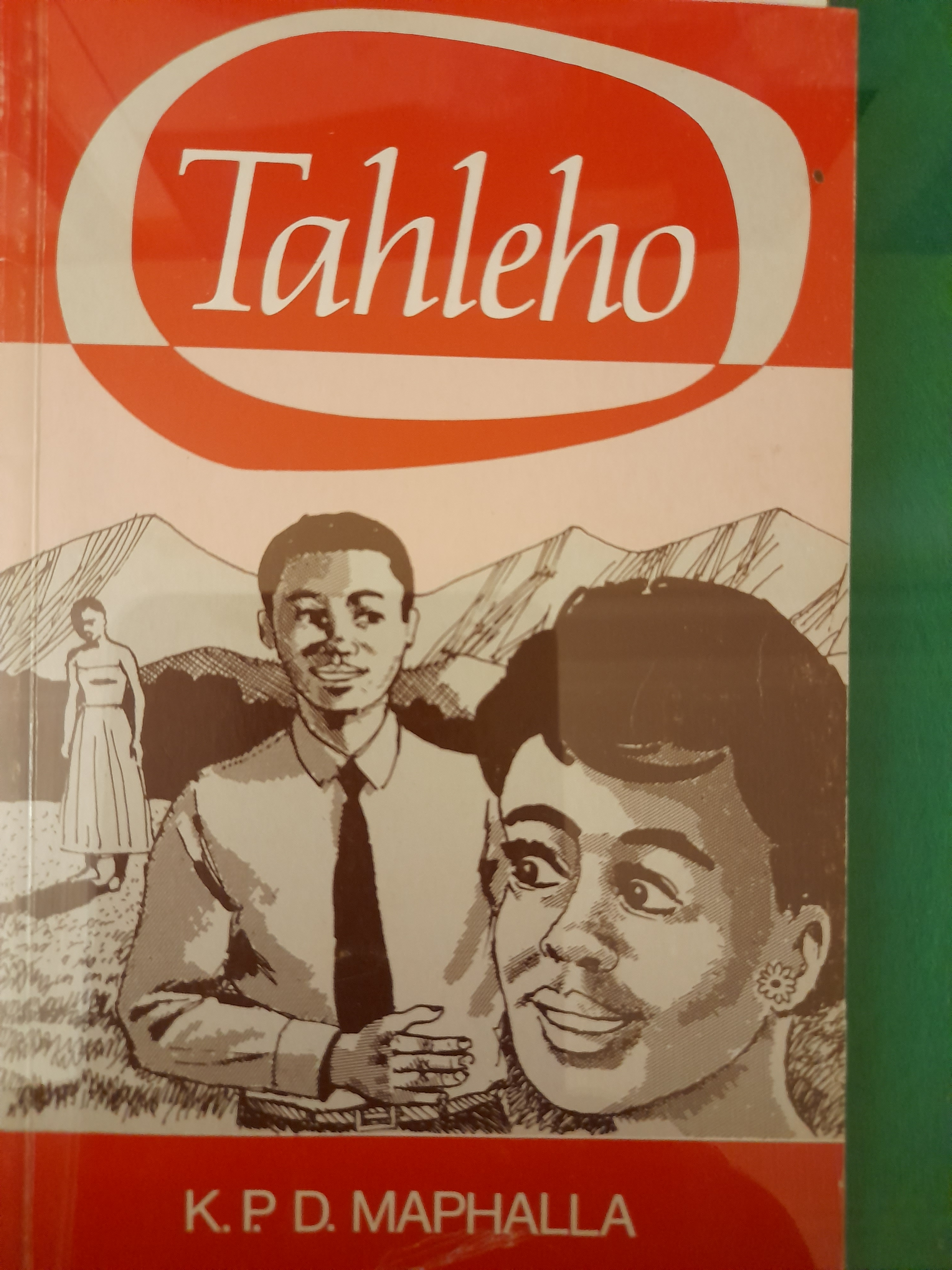
Tahleho, by KDP Maphalla

In 2023, the South African Journal of African Languages published an issue that contained several articles examining Maphalla's writings, volume 43, number 1.

== Relevant literature ==
- Chaphole, Sol. "KPD Maphalla’s autobiographical poetry: narrating oneself in verse." South African Journal of African Languages 43, no. 1 (2023): 69-75.
- Monyakane, Mathai, and Elias Nyefolo Malete. "The application of appraisal theory in Maphalla’s poem: ‘Ditema’." South African Journal of African Languages 43, no. 1 (2023): 40-46.
- Motinyane, Mantoa. "A critical discourse analysis of Maphalla’s selected poems: South Africa’s pre-democratic election messages." South African Journal of African Languages 43, no. 1 (2023): 76-84.
- Phindane, Pule. "The significance of the naming technique in KPD Maphalla’s novel, Kabelwamanong." South African Journal of African Languages 43, no. 1 (2023): 56-60.
- Possa-Mogoera, Rethabile. "Naming technique in Maphalla’s drama Tahleho." South African Journal of African Languages 43, no. 1 (2023): 61-68.
- Seema, Johannes. "Reflections on KPD Maphalla’s poetry: political, spiritual and social perspectives." South African Journal of African Languages 43, no. 1 (2023): 85-92.
- Zulu, Nogwaja S. "The literary oeuvre of KPD Maphalla: a thematic analysis." South African Journal of African Languages 43, no. 1 (2023): 47-55.
- Zulu, Nogwaja S. and Elias N. Malete. "The literary production of KPD Maphalla: an introduction." South African Journal of African Language 43, no. 1 (2023): 37-39.
