= Cleyvis Natera =

- Born: Dominican Republic
- Citizenship: American
- Education: Skidmore College (BA); New York University (MFA)
- Occupations: Novelist, educator
- Website: cleyvisnatera.com

Cleyvis Natera is a Dominican-American novelist and educator. She teaches at Barnard College and Montclair State University, and The New School.

== Life ==
Cleyvis Natera was born in the Dominican Republic. She immigrated to the United States at the age of 10 and grew up in New York City.

Natera graduated from Skidmore College (BA) and New York University (MFA).

She lives in Montclair, New Jersey, with her husband and two children.

== Career ==
Natera's work has appeared in The Rumpus, The New York Times, and The Kenyon Review. She is an adjunct professor at Barnard College, an assistant professor at Montclair State University, a part-time lecturer at The New School, and a lecturer at St. Joseph's University.

Her published novels include Neruda on the Park (2022) and The Grand Paloma Resort (2025).

She was a PEN America Writing for Justice Fellow in 2019, a Virginia Center for the Creative Arts Fiction Fellow in 2020, and a Bread Loaf Writers' Conference Toni Morrison Fiction Fellow in 2024. She is a Fulbright Specialist until April 2027.

== Publications ==
- Neruda on the Park. New York: Ballantine Books. 2022. ISBN 978-0-593-35848-1.
- The Grand Paloma Resort. New York: Ballantine Books. 2025. ISBN 978-0-593-87328-1.
