= Meisterstück =

Top line of Montblanc pens and products

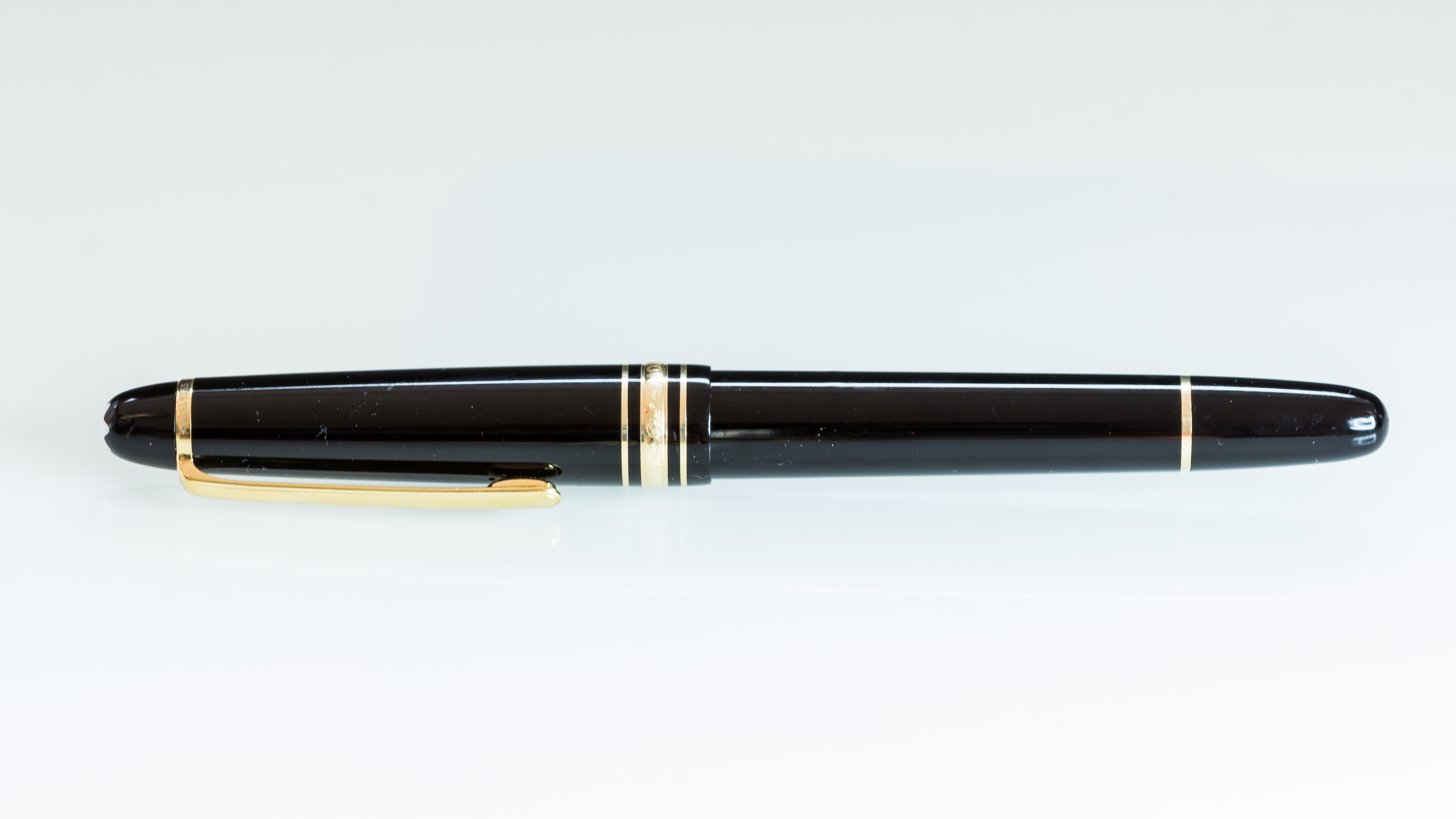
Meisterstück

Meisterstück (German for masterpiece) is the flagship, iconic line of pens from luxury brand Montblanc.

Although principally concerned with writing instruments, the brand has of late used the Meisterstück name in association with members of its diversified product range including watches, jewelry and leather goods.

== History ==
Initially produced for craftsmen's personal use and experimentation with filling mechanisms, the first Meisterstück (German for "masterpiece") pens were unintended for sale. It was produced for public sale in 1924 and evolved to denote the then Simplo company's iconic line of writing instruments bearing warranted nibs and offering higher grade features than other models, such as the incorporation of celluloid and precious metals. Its design has never been static, as it's been "tweaked" over the years. However, in 1952, an oversized Meisterstück was produced and the "heft and brawn" of that model largely became the prototype for the Meisterstück as we conceive it today.

Designers like Marc Newson have been commissioned to reimagine the Meisterstück over time. Designs draw inspiration from legendary writers like Robert Louis Stevenson and Edgar Allan Poe. In 2024, the icon reached its 100th year and to mark the occasion the company released the Doué Classique fountain pen, part of the Meisterstück centennial capsule.

== Modern Meisterstücks ==
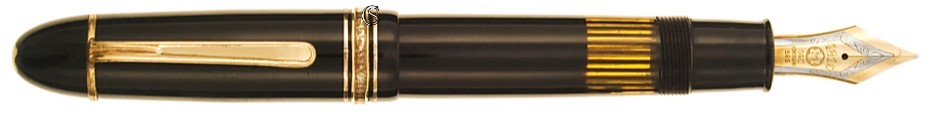
Montblanc Meister149

Modern Meisterstücks include fountain pens, ballpoints, rollerballs, mechanical pencils, and even a highlighter pen.

Unlike vintage Meisterstück pens, modern variants are usually formed from a composite resin instead of celluloid and bear most similarity to the Meisterstück designs of the 1950s. However, in continuation with the previous models using higher-end materials, metal and precious metal variations are made under the sub-designation "Solitaire".
