= Julie Iromuanya =

American author and academic

Julie Iromuanya (born 1982) is an American author and academic. Her 2015 novel Mr. and Mrs. Doctor was a finalist for the PEN/Faulkner Award for Fiction, was shortlisted for the PEN/Robert W. Bingham Prize for Debut Fiction, was the runner-up for the 2016 Etisalat Prize for Literature and was longlisted for the 2015 National Book Critics Circle John Leonard Prize for Debut Fiction.

== Education ==
Iromuanya, who was born in Lincoln, Nebraska, to immigrant parents from Nigeria, graduated from the University of Central Florida with a Bachelor of Arts degree and got her M.A. and Ph.D. at the University of Nebraska–Lincoln. She teaches as an assistant professor of English and Africana literature at the University of Chicago. She has been part of the faculty at the University of Dayton, the University of Tampa, Northeastern Illinois University, and the University of Arizona’s MFA Program in Creative Writing.
