= Maretha Maartens =

South African author, freelance journalist and editor

- Born: 22 June 1995; Bloemfontein, Free State, South Africa
- Occupation: Author
- Spouse: Hennie Maartens
- Children: Danila and Naomi
- Writing career
- Genres: Children's literature, religious books
- Notable awards: Sanlam Prize for Youth Literature; Maskew Miller Longman Literature Awards; Credo Award; Volkskas Prize for Youth Literature; Andrew Murray Award; ATKV Prize

Maretha Maartens (22 June 1945), is a South African author, freelance journalist and editor who writes children's and religious books that deal with the discrimination of blacks, especially of women and children. In 1993, she received an award for children's books of the Catholic Church of Austria.

== Biographies ==
Maretha Maartens was born at Bloemfontein and grew up in Jacobsdal and Petrusburg. She graduated from the University of the Orange Free State and at Stellenbosch University and she obtained a diploma in nursing. Maartens worked as an editor at Finesse magazine.

She is the author of more than 150 books, many of which have been translated into Dutch, English and German.

Maartens has two children, Danila and Naomi, and is married to Hennie Maartens, a pastor.
