= Holland Park Press =

London publishing house founded in 2009

- Founded: 2009; 17 years ago
- Founder: Bernadette Jansen op de Haar
- Country of origin: United Kingdom
- Headquarters location: London, England
- Publication types: Books
- Official website: www.hollandparkpress.co.uk

Holland Park Press is an independent, privately owned, London-based publishing house. It was founded in 2009 by Bernadette Jansen op de Haar.

Holland Park Press has an Anglo-Dutch flavour as its speciality is to publish contemporary Dutch writers in Dutch and English. The company also publishes new works written in English and translations of classic Dutch novels. The Press specialises in fiction and poetry.

Holland Park Press also publishes an online magazine with weekly columns on topical issues.

== Books by Holland Park Press ==
- Eline Vere by Louis Couperus, completely revised translation of J. T. Grein
- Angel by Arnold Jansen op de Haar, translated by Bernadette Jansen op de Haar
- Engel by Arnold Jansen op de Haar
- Top of the Sixties by David Ayres
- The Lonely Tree by Yael Politis
- King of Tuzla by Arnold Jansen op de Haar, translated by Paul Vincent
- De koning van Tuzla by Arnold Jansen op de Haar
- Hedwig’s Journey (original title: Van de koele meren des doods) by Frederik van Eeden, updated translation of Margaret Robinson
- Yugoslav Requiem by Arnold Jansen op de Haar, translated by Paul Vincent
- Joegoslavisch requiem by Arnold Jansen op de Haar
- Finding Soutbek by Karen Jennings
- Everything Must Go by Rosie Garland
- To Sing Away the Darkest Days by Norbert Hirschhorn
- Hold Still by Cherry Smyth
- Where is My Mask of an Honest Man? by Laura Del-Rivo
- Away from the Dead by Karen Jennings
- Diaspo/Renga by Marilyn Hacker and Deema K. Shehabi
- The Stray American by Wendy Brandmark
- Place Lamartine by Jeroen Blokhuis
- Lamartine Square by Jeroen Blokhuis
- 100 Dutch-Language Poems, From the Medieval Period to the Present Day, selected and translated by Paul Vincent and John Irons
- Winegarden by Anthony Ferner
- The Island by Karen Jennings – longlisted for the 2021 Booker Prize
