= Tejumola Olaniyan =

Nigerian academic (1959–2019)

- Born: 3 April 1959
- Died: 30 November 2019 (aged 60)
- Education: University of Ife; Cornell University
- Occupation: Academic

Tejumola Olaniyan (3 April 1959 – 30 November 2019) was a Nigerian academic. He was the Louise Durham Mead Professor of English and African Cultural Studies, and the Wole Soyinka Professor of the Humanities at the University of Wisconsin–Madison. A former President of the African Literature Association (2014–2015), Olaniyan has approximately 35 of his works in more than 100 publications, and all in one language. He died on 30 November 2019.

== Early life ==
Olaniyan earned his bachelor's degree in Dramatic Arts from the University of Ife in Nigeria in 1982, where he was taught by Wole Soyinka. Three years later, he received his Master of Arts degree there. Olaniyan attended Cornell University, where he earned an MA (1989) and PhD (1991).

== Career ==
Olaniyan's main interests were: Africa and its diaspora; African-American, Caribbean, and African literatures; criticism, post-cultural studies, history, theory and the sociology of drama; and pop culture (art, music, and architecture). His works included Arrest the Music!: Fela and His Rebel Art and Politics (2004, 2009; nominated for Best Research in World Music by the Association for Recorded Sound Collections in 2005) and Scars of Conquest/Masks of Resistance: The Invention of Cultural Identities in African, African American and Caribbean Drama (1995). He was co-editor of African Literature: An Anthology of Criticism and Theory (2007, with Ato Quayson), African Drama and Performance (2004, with John Conteh-Morgan), and African Diaspora and the Disciplines (2010, with James H. Sweet). Olaniyan practiced different approaches, which allow others to experience new perspectives. He stated: "My deep interest is transdisciplinary teaching and research; my goal is the cultivation of critical self-reflexivity about our expressions and their many contexts."

Olaniyan focused on the post-colonial African state. In this research, Olaniyan explored pop culture while trying to depict the state's "elite" cultural aspects. His research encompassed music, architecture, literature and political cartooning. Understanding how the State influences these practices helps in composing a cultural biography of the postcolonial African State. His larger goal was to resolve the social crisis through increased understanding.

== Works ==
=== "Uplift the Race!" ===
"Uplift the Race" is an in-depth look at films such as Coming to America and Do the Right Thing. This article discusses this idea of "uplifting the race" and how the portrayal of this appears in films. The article begins with a quote from Eddie Murphy who basically says the white majority has created a system in which powerful black men feel the need to whisper 'white' in their own office. Olaniyan then discusses a quote from Michael Foucault that describes the situation Murphy talks about in his quote. Olaniyan quotes Paul Rabinow from "Representations Are Social Facts: Modernity and Post modernity in Anthropology" on the power of representation. Olaniyan states that Rabinow is saying "To be in control of (the means of) representation is therefore, to be in a position of power: that is, to be in control of the production, promotion, and circulation of subjectivities". Olaniyan finds it interesting that in popular opinion, both films failed do that. He discusses how Coming to America 'others' the African people. First, he discusses how the forest and house scenes support this exoticized idea of Africa. He suggests that the film shows Hollywood's idea of Africa's 'civilized' culture. He discusses the role of black women, claiming that they are the "scenery". He then discusses how Coming To America freezes African culture in a "one-dimensional frame" whereas Do the Right Thing gives its audience an unexpected and unapologetic view. Lee displays three-dimensional characters. In the end, Lee fails because he loses sight of the goal of "uplifting the race". Olanyian says that they both failed due to their representations of women. He felt that both failed to see the intersectionality of gender and race, therefore not uplifting the race.

==== Terms ====
- Postcolonial Incredible – The Postcolonial Incredible emerges in Olaniyan's analyses of Afrobeat music and designates a regime of crises and morbidities as normative elements of Postcolonial states. Olaniyan writes: "the 'incredible' inscribes that which cannot be believed; that which is too improbable, astonishing, and extraordinary to be believed. The incredible is not simply a breach but an outlandish infraction of “normality” and its limits. If “belief,” as faith, confidence, trust, and conviction, underwrites the certainty and tangibility of institutions and practices of social exchange, the incredible dissolves all such props of stability, normality, and intelligibility (and therefore of authority) and engenders social and symbolic crisis."
- Race/Racial Uplift – A description of the responses of black leaders, activists and spokespersons to the racial discrimination marked by the assault on civil and political rights of African Americans. Many of these leaders feel a need to defend the good intent and honor of African Americans, while also countering negative black stereotypes. Olanyian mentions race uplift throughout "Uplift the Race" and questions why it is a favorable mode of response to racial subjectification. The author questions why race uplift is 'privileged' as a response to the unequal power relations in America. In Olanyian's discussion of Coming To America and Do The Right Thing, he presents the idea that racial uplift can actually lead to 'othering' of African Americans.
- Othering – Othering is defined by wordnik.com as "the process of perceiving or portraying someone or something as fundamentally different or alien." It is an egocentric viewpoint in which a person sees themselves at the heart of society and the different or others to be less-important and less-connected to the group. This undermines social progress. Olanyian discusses othering, claiming that racial uplift others the African Americans it is trying to help by dividing them from their leaders.
- Coevalness – Multiple things of the same time, duration or age. The purpose of coevalness is to provide authenticity, acknowledgment that something does exist.
- Appropriation – bell hooks states that appropriation violates another culture by creating a "fake" or a cheap imitation therefore always falling second to the original. Olaniyan says that appropriation denies the native "other" and denies coevalness in the sense that it establishes an authoritative idea (a "dominant gaze"). This poses the questions of whose ideas are dominant and therefore more important. Furthermore, whether this dominant idea provides a fair representation and whether the author's word dilutes the idea's authenticity.
- Power of Representation – This power comes from the ability to create one's own reality. Participation enables original constructions and better understanding of the result. Furthermore, participants can create their own reality. Controlling one's representation is a position of power. The power conferred by controlling representation is transformed into a metaphorical and symbolic domination.
