= Montblanc (company) =

German luxury goods manufacturer

Montblanc International GmbH

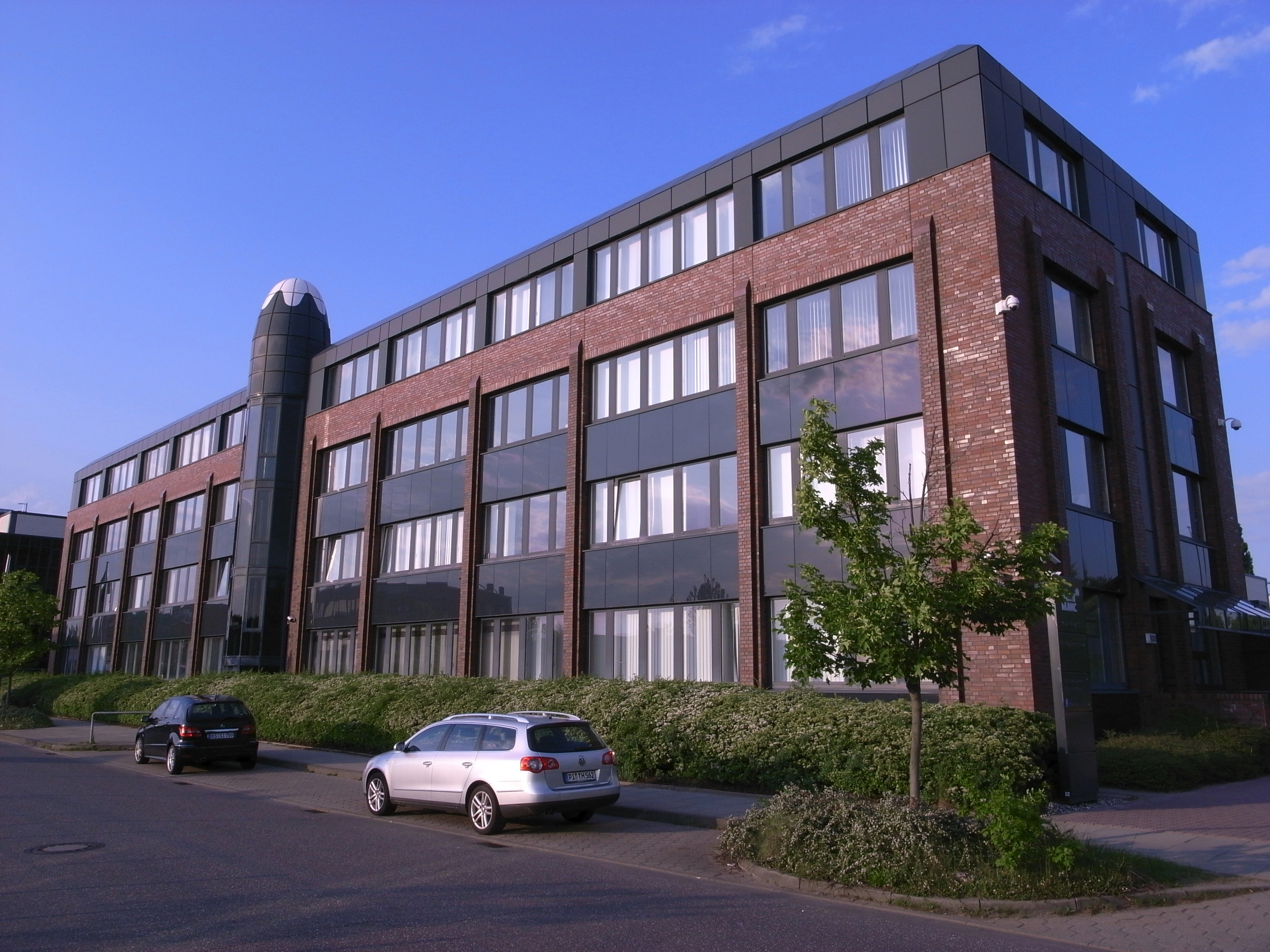
- Montblanc headquarters, Hamburg, Germany
- Formerly: Simplizissiumus-Füllhalter (1906–1907); Simplo Filler Pen Co. GmbH (1907–1934)
- Type: Subsidiary
- Industry: Luxury goods
- Founded: 22 March 1906; 120 years ago in Berlin, Germany
- Headquarters: Hellgrundweg 100, 22525 Hamburg, Germany; 53.5937423°N 9.8990675°E
- Number of locations: 638 boutiques (2021)
- Key people: Giorgio Sarné (CEO, 2024-present)
- Products: Pens; bags; leather goods; watches
- Revenue: €370.4 million (2017)
- Parent: Richemont
- Website: montblanc.com

Montblanc (UK: /ˌmɒˈblɒ(k)/, US: /ˌmɑːn(t)ˈblɑːŋk/) is a German manufacturer and distributor of luxury goods, which was founded in Berlin in 1906 and is currently based in Hamburg. The company is most known for its luxury pens, but it also designs and distributes bags, perfumes, small leather goods, and watches. Since 1993, Montblanc has been part of the Swiss Richemont group. The brand is named after Mont Blanc, the highest mountain in the Alps.

== History ==
August Eberstein, a Berlin engineer, produced simple pens in 1906, financed by Alfred Nehemias, a Hamburg banker. After a short period, Wilhelm Dziambor, Christian Lausen, and later Claus Johannes Voss took over the business. Their first model was the Rouge et Noir in 1909, followed in 1910 (Note: Some sources claim that only the trademark was created in 1910, while the pen itself wasn't released until 1913 or 1914.) by the pen that later gave the company its new name, Montblanc GmbH. The Meisterstück name (lit. 'Masterpiece', and the name used for export) was used for the first time in 1924. The Meisterstück fountain pen is understood to be the longest continuous model of the fountain pen industry, traceable to at least 1952. Today, the Montblanc brand sells goods besides pens, including watches, jewellery, earphones, fragrances, leather goods, and eyewear.

The company was founded in 1906 as Simplizissiumus-Füllhalter in Berlin. In 1907, it moved to Hamburg and changed its name to Simplo Filler Pen Co. GmbH; it was incorporated under that name in 1908. Its current name (Montblanc International GmbH) was adopted in 1934.

Alfred Dunhill Ltd. acquired Montblanc in 1977, after which lower-priced pens were dropped, and the brand was used on a wide range of luxury goods other than pens.

In 1993, Montblanc became part of the Swiss Richemont group. Its sister companies include Cartier, Van Cleef & Arpels, Chloé, and Baume et Mercier luxury brands. Montblanc is owned, through Richemont, by the South African Rupert family.

In October 2014, Montblanc passed the first blocking order against trademark-infringing consumer goods against the major UK Internet service providers (ISPs) to block several domains selling trademark-infringing products.

== Corporate leadership ==
Jan-Patrick Schmitz was previously president and CEO of Montblanc North America from 2003-2014.

Nicolas Baretzki served as Maison (global) CEO from 2017 until 2023. His predecessor was Jérôme Lambert, who was global CEO from 2013-2017. (Note: Lutz Bethge was Montblanc International CEO before Jérôme Lambert. Lambert was CEO at Jaeger-LeCoultre before moving to Montblanc, and from Montblanc he moved to the parent company, Richemont, in what is a very conventional pattern for Montblanc Maison CEOs.) Before becoming CEO, Baretski had worked in the role of executive vice-president for sales at the company from 2013. His background included twelve years at Jaeger-LeCoultre as international sales director and graduating from the École des hautes études commerciales de Paris.

In September 2024, Montblanc announced the appointment of Giorgio Sarné, president of Tapestry Asia, CEO of Coach Asia, and brand president of Stuart Weitzman. Sarné took office as global Maison CEO, effective 15 November 2024.

Stephanie Radl took on the role of director of brand relations and communications in 2025. A graduate of the London College of Fashion, she was with Montblanc as international public relations director for seven years when she took on her new role.

=== Corporate structure (Note: Corporate structure is based on data here: https://craft.co/montblanc) ===
- Chief Executive Officer
- Global Managing Director (Watch Division)
- Managing Director (Korea)
- Chief Financial Officer
- Chief Marketing Officer / Executive Board Member
- Chief Merchandising Officer / Executive Board Member
- Director, IT & Organization

== Creative leadership ==
Zaim Kamal became the creative director of Montblanc in 2013. From the beginning, he was keen to bring the brand into conformity with modern notions of luxury and also to work with celebrities (like Billy Porter) and prestigious public figures to enhance the brand's fashionable reputation.

In 2021, Montblanc's creative direction changed hands to Marco Tomassetta. (Note: Richemont press release: https://www.richemont.com/media/j2hgjacq/2021-02-19.pdf) As outlined in the official release from Richemont, the parent company of Montblanc, Tomassetta's background was said to be strongest in the Italian leather goods industry. He had previously been Creative Design Director of leather goods at Givenchy and had worked in leather goods and accessories at numerous other luxury brands. Miles Socha of Women's Wear Daily reported that Tomassetta's approach to the job is largely defined by his unifying vision, not only in terms of the different areas in the company (pens, watches, bags, etc.) but also in terms of broader appeal to women, who represented "about half of our customers," according to Nicolas Baretzki, the CEO at the time.

== Products ==
=== Pens ===
Meisterstück is the company's flagship, iconic line of pens. The Meisterstück pen, as a purchasable item and with many variations, dates back more than one hundred years; it reached centennial status in 2024.

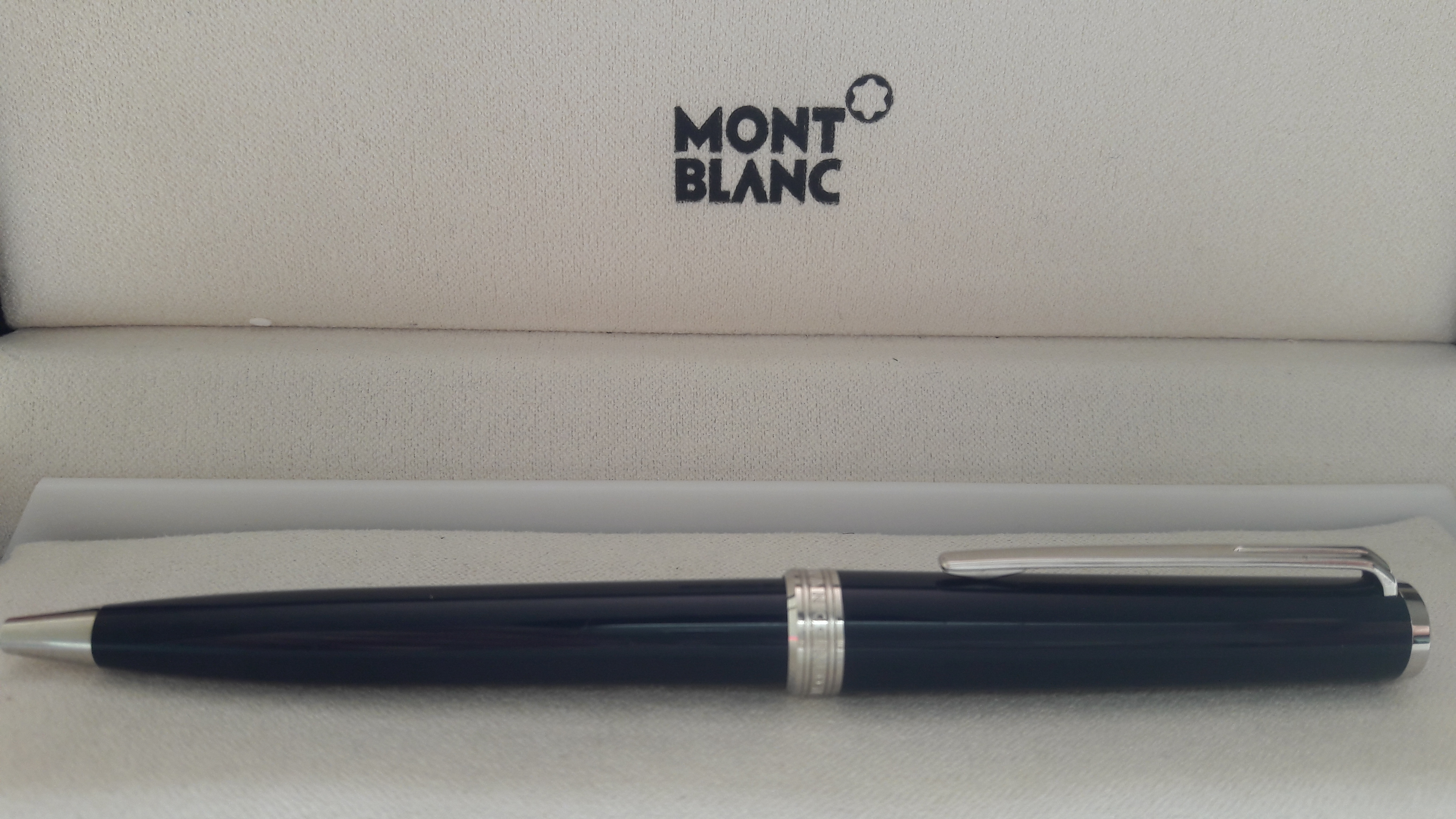
MontBlanc Flix blue

Montblanc Enzo Ferrari special edition pens at Makoba pen store, Bengaluru (2026)

Montblanc pens (rollerball, ballpoint, fountain, fineliner, calligraphy) and luxury mechanical pencils are regarded with high prestige. They are coveted as collector's items as status symbols, works of art, financial investment, and family heirlooms.

The most expensive regular production fountain pens are traditionally Montblancs, with some retail pens (like the rare editions with only a hundred or less made) selling more than US$30,000, and some specialty pens selling for substantially more. Many upper-tier models are purchased as investments and never used.

An article in the Associated Press that was also printed in the Washington Post in 1989 indicated that the decade saw a noticeable peak in retail for Montblanc fountain pens. "Fountain pens are the fastest-growing category of writing instruments. About 12 million were sold in 1987, 21 million last year. Because they require special care -- refilling the ink and professional cleanings -- fountain pens have more cachet," said a marketing executive from Waterman Pens at the time. An executive from the Parker Pen Company elaborated by saying that cachet and appearance were everything when it came to the fountain pen surge in the 1980s. In 2019, when there was another surge in the market for fountain pens, the 1980s boom was referenced again by the Washington Post. It was mentioned that, after the continued surge of the fountain pen in the 1990s, there was a dramatic dip following the 2008 financial crisis. Then came the revival in the late 2010s, especially among millennials, it was noted. In 2023, Washington Post contributor Tara Bahrampour noted that the generation that didn't learn cursive had taken a surprising fancy to the fountain pen, along with surging interest in slower, less digital activities like journaling and drawing by hand.

CEO Nicolas Baretzki noted these cultural trends, rises, and peaks during his tenure as well as the interesting and counterintuitive fact that the COVID-19 pandemic did not significantly harm the luxury pen market, but in fact, rather worked in its favor as the usual pace of modern living slowed down and people spent more time at home.

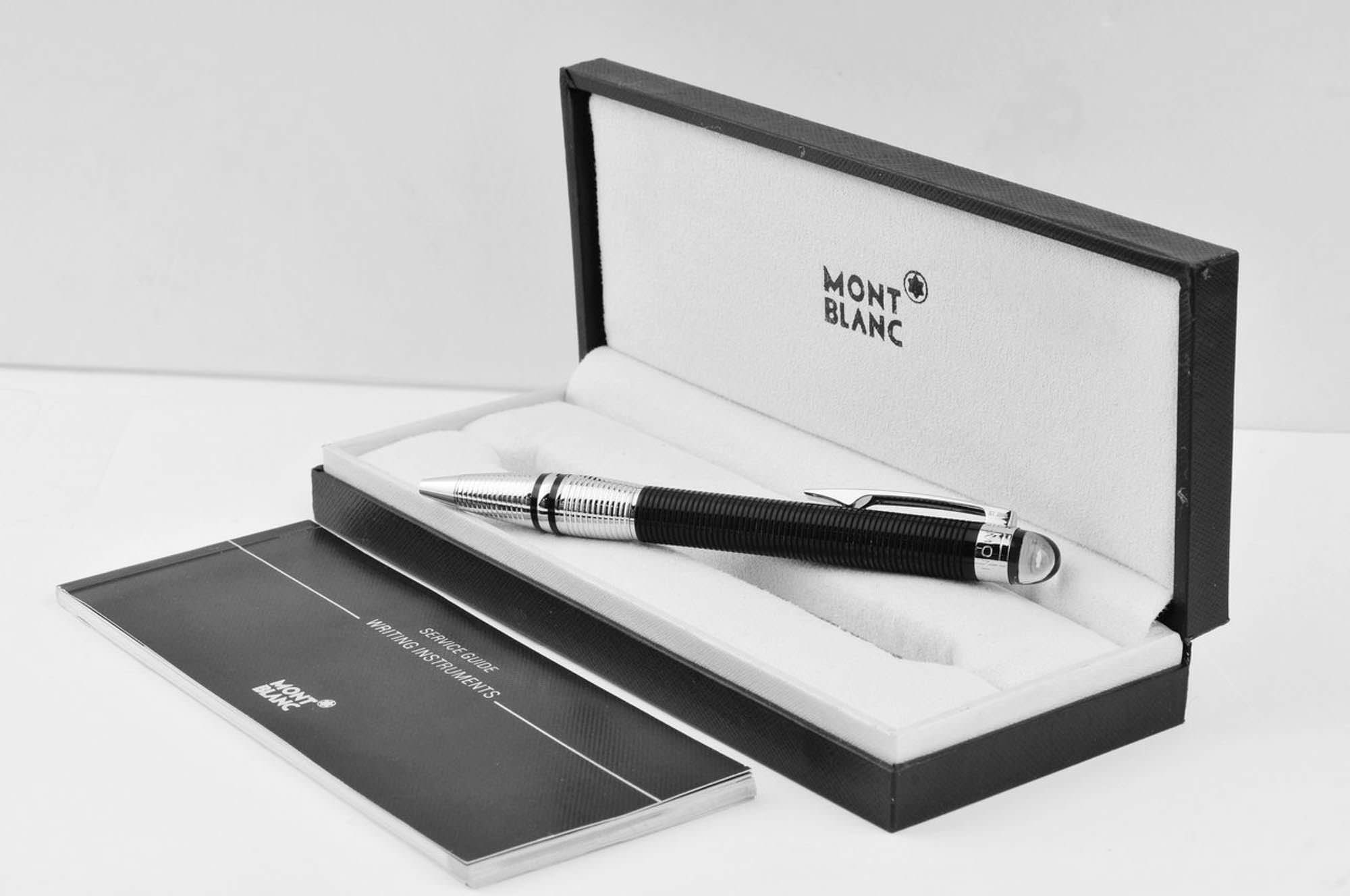
Montblanc StarWalker pen

==== Great characters ====
The Great Characters Series, launched in 2009, is a line of fountain pens honoring legendary figures. The pens are "designed to annually honor a cultural icon, great thinker or emblematic leader." The list includes: (Note: This list is based on a list, "LIST OF ALL MONTBLANC GREAT CHARACTERS," at Inkstable.com, accessed and archived on Wikiwix on 21 June 2026. It covers from 2009-2021.)

- Mahatma Gandhi 2009
- Alfred Hitchcock 2011
- Albert Einstein 2012
- Leonardo da Vinci 2013
- John F. Kennedy 2014
- Andy Warhol 2015
- Miles Davis 2016
- The Beatles 2017
- James Dean 2018
- Walt Disney 2019
- Elvis Presley 2020
- Enzo Ferrari 2021

==== Writers edition ====
Writers Edition pens pay hommage to the literary masters, including: (Note: This list is based on a post from the blog, "Paulo's Pen Posts." Accessed on 21 June 2026.)

- Ernest Hemingway 1992 (Note: Auction of Fine And Limited Edition Pens, Dreweatts.com, accessed on 20 June 2026)
- Agatha Christie 1993
- Oscar Wilde 1994
- Voltaire 1995
- Alexandre Dumas 1996
- Fyodor Dostoevsky 1997
- Edgar Allan Poe 1998
- Marcel Proust 1999
- Friedrich Schiller 2000
- Charles Dickens 2001
- F. Scott Fitzgerald 2002
- Jules Verne 2003
- Franz Kafka 2004
- Miguel de Cervantes 2005
- Virginia Woolf 2006
- William Faulkner 2007
- George Bernard Shaw 2008
- Thomas Mann 2009
- Mark Twain 2010
- Carlo Collodi 2011
- Jonathan Swift 2012
- Honoré de Balzac 2013
- Daniel Defoe 2014
- Leo Tolstoy 2015
- William Shakespeare 2016
- Antoine de Saint-Exupéry 2017
- Homer 2018
- Rudyard Kipling 2019
- Victor Hugo 2020
- Sir Arthur Conan Doyle 2021
- Brothers Grimm 2022
- Robert Louis Stevenson 2023
- Jane Austen 2024
- Johann Wolfgang von Goethe (2025)
- Bram Stoker 2026

=== Capsules, collaborations, and commemorative editions ===
While Montblanc is most known for its luxury pens, it also designs and distributes bags, small leather goods, and watches. The company also produces special editions of pens and watches and other items that are either commemorative (limited edition) or by private order of customized items at the Atelier Creation Privée.

In 2007, Montblanc celebrated the life of Rainier III, Prince of Monaco with its production of 81 (marking the prince's age when he died) fountain pens. Half the proceeds from the sale of this pen were donated to the Princess Grace Foundation.

In 2011, Montblanc made a pen celebrating the Marriage of Albert II, Prince of Monaco and Charlene Wittstock. This was marketed as the Royal Wedding Pen, a private creation of which was launched at the Artisan Atelier in Hamburg before use by the princely couple to sign the marriage register. This private creation, with 128 diamonds and 161 rubies, was the only pen made, exclusively for the princely couple and not for public sale.

In 2012, Montblanc launched its Collection Princess Grace de Monaco, a collection of bejeweled ballpoint pens and fountain pens. This collection included a ballpoint pen with a drop-cut pink sapphire; a rare edition of three pens symbolizing the princess's three children (Albert II, Princess Caroline, and Princess Stephanie); a limited edition of 29 fountain pens; and broader-availability, special edition fountain pen, ballpoint pen, and rollerball pen.

In 2018, Charlotte Casiraghi (granddaughter of Monaco's Princess Grace and Prince Rainier III, and global brand ambassador herself since 2015) collaborated with Montblanc's creative director, Zaim Kamal, on a line of jewelry called Les Aimants. The capsule was inspired by a photograph of Nancy Cunard from 1926 that was taken by Man Ray and is part of the photographic collections at the Metropolitan Museum of Art. It was officially launched at the 2018 Cannes Film Festival.

In November 2019, Montblanc launched a partnership with The Webster for a limited-edition, capsule collection.

In 2022, the company began collaborating with streetwear brand BAPE and lifestyle brand Maison Kitsuné to broaden its leather goods portfolio and attract a younger audience. CEO Nicolas Baretzki told Vogue Business in 2022 that he believes leather goods will become one of the company's biggest categories, possibly even overtaking pens.

In 2024, a capsule was created to celebrate the novel Around the World in Eighty Days by Jules Verne. The design of the cap invokes the length of that journey—25 days.

=== Watches ===
Montblanc entered the watches market in 1996. The following year, Montblanc Montre S.A was established in Le Locle, Switzerland, a place known for a long historical link with the watch industry. So far the company only made men's watches. In 2000, Montblanc Montre launched its Meisterstück Sports watch collection. Ten years later, the Metamorphosis watch further cemented the reputation of Montblanc watches for innovation because of its complex system of synchronously moving components. (Note: See References: Bibliography in Albertini (2025) cites "Montblanc Watch History" in "The History of Montblanc," The Pen Shop (UK), 29 October 2021. The citation refers to an accession of this article in 2019.)

In 2006, Richemont, the parent company of Montblanc, bought the Swiss watch company Fabrique d'Horlogerie Minerva (known for short as Minerva), whose hand-finished chronographs date back to 1858. Montblanc was still considered to be perfecting its watchmaking production, so the acquisition of Minerva signaled a positive future for the brand in this area. Montblanc released the Collection Villeret 1858 in 2007, the name of the collection signaling the year and place of Minerva's origin. Montblanc had established the Institut Minerva to train watchmakers. The new school led to the creation of the Star Nicolas Rieussec Monopusher Chronograph, the first Montblanc-branded watch made entirely at the Le Locle facility, and named for the famous watchmaker Nicolas Rieussec of the royal court of Louis-Philippe. The Rieussec watch signals real credibility as a watchmaker in Montblanc's history and is considered to have only been possible due to the acquisition of the Minerva company.

Twenty years after the acquisition of Minerva, Montblanc has decided to bring the Minerva brand back to its own productions. Pieces made at the Atelier in Villeret will now (as of June 2026) be branded Minerva watches, and pieces made at the Atelier in Le Locle will be branded as Montblanc watches.

== Branding ==
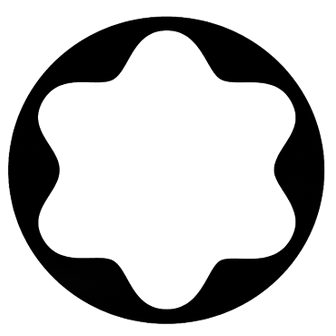
Snowcap logo

A trademark identified with Montblanc is the white stylized six-pointed star with rounded edges, representing the Mont Blanc snowcap from above, the symbol adopted in 1913. The number "4810," the mountain's height in metres, is a common recurring theme.

Montblanc is an official sponsor of the Les Rencontres Philosophiques de Monaco, of which brand ambassador Charlotte Casiraghi is founding president since 2015.

=== Global Brand Ambassadors ===
In January 2014, Hugh Jackman was announced as Montblanc's Global Brand Ambassador, outside of the United States. The deal extended to North America in 2016.

In October 2015, Monegasque philosopher Charlotte Casiraghi was announced as another Global Brand Ambassador for the company. The announcement accompanied a new advertising campaign for the Boheme Collection featuring Casiraghi wearing the Boheme Night & Day watch.

Soccer star Zinédine Zidane became a brand ambassador for Montblanc in 2022.

Other Montblanc brand ambassadors include: American filmmaker Wes Anderson, English actor Rupert Friend, Chinese actress Xin Zhilei, and Chinese actor Jing Boran.

== In popular culture ==
The Étoile de Montblanc Joaillière Cognac Limited Edition pen was featured on the Season 2 premiere of Your Friends & Neighbors. Only fifteen of these 18-karat rose gold pens were produced worldwide.

== Gandhi pen controversy ==
Original footage of Gandhi and his followers marching to Dandi in the Salt March of 1930

In 2010, Montblanc succumbed to pressure to suspend sales of its Great Characters: Mahatma Gandhi pen (released in September 2009) inside India. An unconditional apology was issued.

A legal case in India was ongoing and the company, thus, decided to suspend sales of the pen in India while the court deliberated. The Centre for Consumer Education in at the High Court in Kerala had filed the lawsuit against the company, citing a violation of a 1950 Indian law regarding the improper use of emblems and names. By the time of the suspension, retailers in India had already sold 42 of the 70 pens that had been issued in the country.

Montblanc had made 241 Gandhi pens, representing the number of miles he walked in his protest against the salt taxes in 1930. Gandhi's great-grandson, Tushar Gandhi, had been supportive of the pen, as Montblanc had committed $145,000 of the sales toward his charitable foundation, The descendants of Gandhi were not united on the issue and Tushar Gandhi had been previously under criticism for allowing commercial use of his ancestor's image.

When the court dismissed the case following the unconditional apology and suspensions of sales in India (a decision upheld by the Supreme Court of India) Montblanc agreed to donate $9 million to charities in India, either directly or through its distributor.

The release of the pens (a rollerball version and a fountain version) had also been timed to mark the 140th anniversary of his birth. Lutzge, Maison CEO at the time, insisted that the pen was intended to honor the legacy of Gandhi as someone who dedicated his life to universal values like non-violent resistance, education, and tolerance. Yet some in India still objected to the use of the image of the spiritual leader being used commercially, as it felt to some like a contradiction of what the man had stood for.

== Philanthropy and charity ==
In 2009, Montblanc initiated "Signature for Good" to benefit UNICEF educational programs for children. Ten percent of every "Signature for Good" product went to UNICEF programs. In 2013, it was estimated that they raised over $5 million. The Signature for Good products, the so-called the Viceroy Collection, consisted of a fountain pen, a rollerball pen, a ballpoint pen, and a mechanical pencil.
