= Cherry Smyth =

Irish academic, poet, writer and art critic

- Born: 1960 (age 65–66); Northern Ireland

Cherry Smyth (born 1960) is a London-based, Irish academic, poet, writer and art critic.

== Biography ==
Cherry Smyth was born in Ballymoney, County Antrim, Northern Ireland. Until 2024, she taught poetry in Greenwich University's Creative writing department. She had her first collection of poetry published in 2001. She worked on an anthology of women prisoner's writing in 2003 which won the Raymond Williams Community Publishing award. Smyth writes for art magazines including Modern Painters, Art Monthly and Art Review. She is also involved in works on Gender studies.

Criticism of her second collection was positive:

Here is clarity and realism, couched in language that is accessible and inventive. The title poem carries all Smyth's hallmarks: precision, linguistic inventiveness and joy.

Smyth's third collection, Famished (2019), is a work of documentary poetry which pieces together a history of the Irish Famine. Smyth has performed it in collaboration with the improvisational singer Lauren Kinsella and the musician Ed Bennett throughout Ireland and the UK.

Smyth was elected a Fellow of the Royal Society of Literature in 2022.

== Bibliography ==
- Lesbians Talk: Queer Notions, 1992
- Normapaths : Jane and Louise Wilson, 1995
- Damn fine art by new lesbian artists, 1996
- Mandy McCartin: from the street: paintings and drawings, 1996
- Butch/femme: inside lesbian gender, 1998
- When the lights go up, 2001
- Strong voice in a small space : women writing on the iniside / foreword by Martina Cole; introduced and edited by Cherry Smyth, 2002
- The future of something delicate, 2005
- One wanted thing, 2006
- Tatton Park Biennial 2012: Flights of Fancy
- Test, Orange, 2012
- Hold Still, 2013
- Famished, 2019
- The pleasure threshold: looking at lesbian pornography on film, 1990
