= Adeline Dieudonné =

Belgian writer

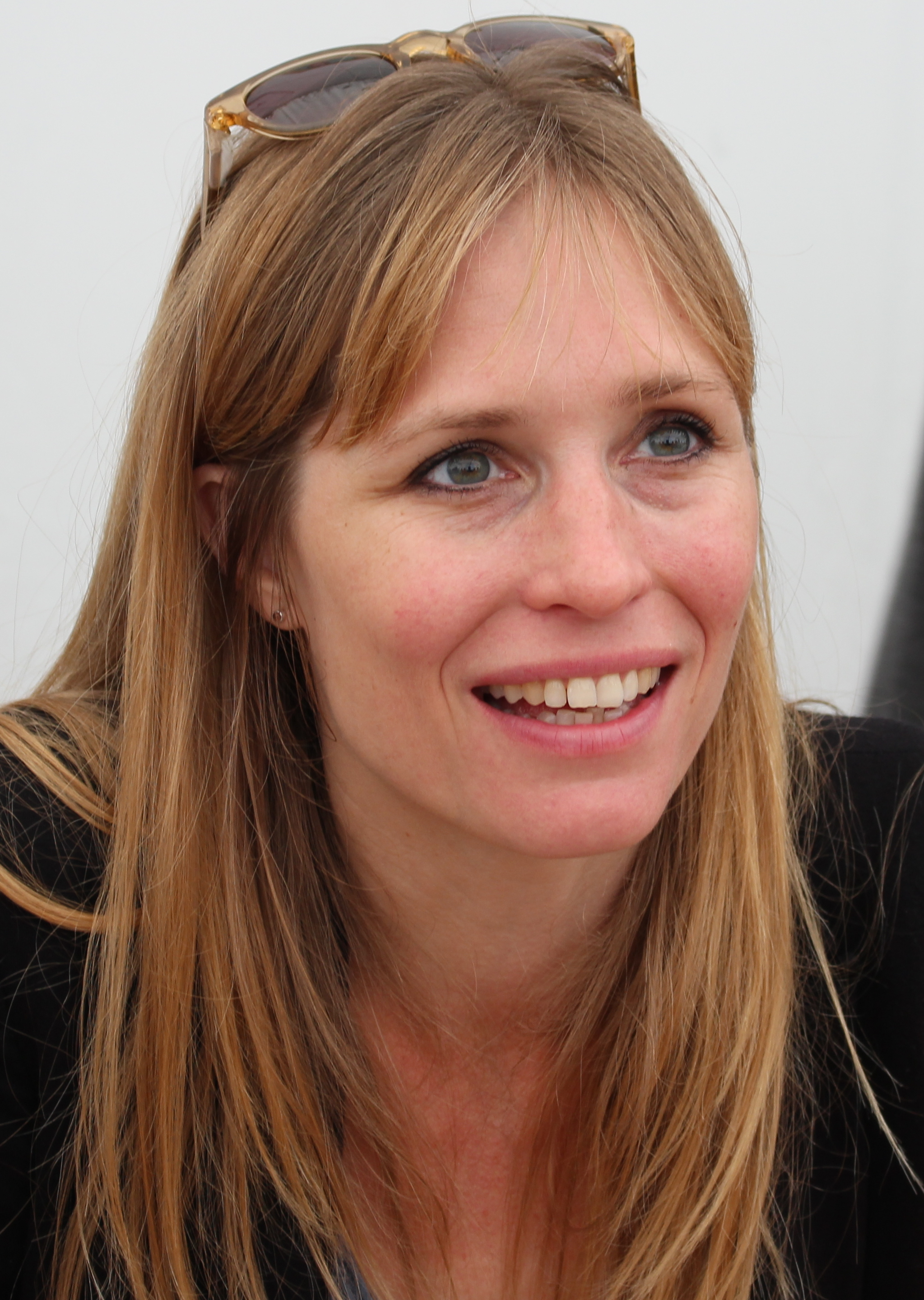
- Born: 12 October 1982 (age 43); Brussels, Belgium
- Writing career
- Language: French
- Notable work: La Vraie Vie (2018)
- Website: www.adelinedieudonne.com

Adeline Dieudonné is a Belgian writer. She is best known for her debut novel Real Life (2018), which won numerous literary prizes in the Francophone world, among them:

- Prix du Roman FNAC
- Prix Rossel
- Prix Renaudot des lycéens
- Prix Goncourt―Le Choix de la Belgique
- Prix des Étoiles du Parisien
- Prix Première Plume
- Prix Filigrane

Dieudonné lives in Brussels where she also performs as a stand-up comedian.
