= Tolu Ogunlesi =

Nigerian journalist and writer (born 1982)

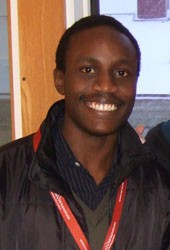
- Ogunlesi in 2010
- Born: Tolulope Ogunlesi; 3 March 1982 (age 44); Edinburgh, Scotland
- Education: International School Ibadan: University of Ibadan; University of East Anglia
- Occupations: Journalist, writer, blogger
- Website: toluogunlesi.wordpress.com

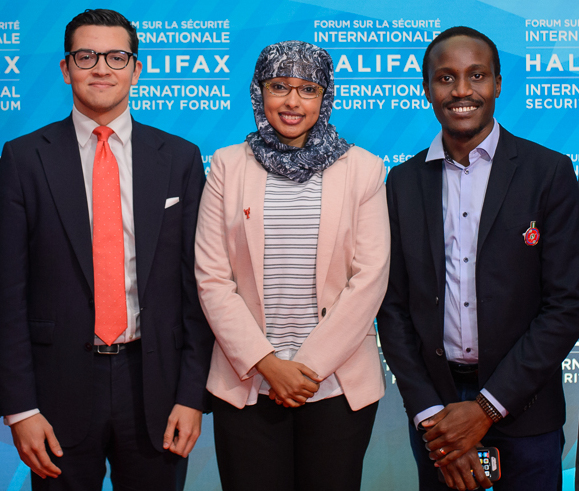
Ogunlesi (right) at the Halifax International Security Forum 2017

Tolu Ogunlesi (born 3 March 1982) is a Nigerian journalist, poet, photographer, fiction writer, and blogger. Ogunlesi was appointed to the role of special assistant on digital/new media by President Muhammadu Buhari on 18 February 2016.

== Early life and education ==
Ogunlesi was born in Edinburgh, Scotland, to Nigerian parents and has lived most of his life in Nigeria. He attended the International School Ibadan. He also holds a 2004 Bachelor of Pharmacy (B. Pharm) degree from the University of Ibadan, Nigeria. In 2011, he earned a MA in creative writing from the University of East Anglia, UK.

== Career ==
As a creative writer, Ogunlesi is the author of a collection of poetry, Listen to the Geckos Singing from a Balcony (Bewrite Books, 2004), and a novella, Conquest & Conviviality (Hodder Murray, 2008). Among publications in which his fiction and poetry have appeared are The London Magazine, Wasafiri, Farafina, PEN Anthology of New Nigerian Writing, Litro, Brand, Orbis, Nano2ales, Stimulus Respond, Sable, Magma, Stanford's Black Arts Quarterly and World Literature Today.

In 2006, he was awarded a Dorothy Sargent Rosenberg poetry prize, in 2008 the Nordic Africa Institute Guest Writer Fellowship, and in 2009 a Cadbury Visiting Fellowship by the University of Birmingham. He has twice been a winner of the annual CNN Multichoice African Journalist Awards, in 2009 (the Arts and Culture prize) and in 2013 (Coca-Cola Company Economics & Business Award), as well as being shortlisted for the inaugural PEN/Studzinski literary prize.

As a journalist, Ogunlesi has been a contributor to Tell Magazine, The Guardian (Lagos), Daily Independent (Nigeria), New Age, Forbes Africa, The Guardian (UK), Financial Times, HuffPost, Business Day (Nigeria), and Premium Times. He was Arts Manager Nigeria for the British Council between 2011 and 2012, and has worked as a Features Editor and Editorial Board member of Next newspaper, and as a West Africa Editor for The Africa Report magazine from 2014 to 2015. He was a 2015 New Media Fellow of the U.S. State Department's International Visitor Leadership Programme (IVLP).

He has said of his writing career: "I started with poetry. Then I tried my hands at fiction — my first short story, Solemn Avenue was inspired by Helon Habila's Waiting for an Angel. And then I moved to journalism — magazine pieces, interviews, satire, reviews, opinion pieces. I have tried my hands at radio drama, at television scripting. I hope to write a full-length play this year. Looking back, I think I have grown comfortable with constantly expanding the possibilities of my writing, and refusing to allow myself be held down by any particular genre."

On 18 February 2016, Nigerian President Muhammadu Buhari appointed Ogunlesi as his Special Assistant on Digital/New Media.

Ogunlesi was selected for Harvard University's Weatherhead fellowship in June 2022.

In May 2023, he was conferred the National honour of Member of the Order of the Niger by President Muhammadu Buhari.

== Publications ==
=== Books by Ogunlesi ===
- Listen to the Geckos Singing from a Balcony. Bewrite Books, 2004, ISBN 978-1904492849. Poetry.
- Conquest & Conviviality. Hodder Murray, 2008, ISBN 978-0340984161. A novella.

=== Publication with contributions by Ogunlesi ===
- Ghost Fishing: An Eco-Justice Poetry Anthology. University of Georgia Press, 2018, ISBN 978-0820353159. Poetry.

== See also ==
- List of Nigerian writers
- List of Nigerian bloggers
- Tunde Eso
