= Travelers (novel) =

2019 novel by Helon Habila

- Author: Helon Habila
- Language: English
- Genre: Literary fiction
- Set in: Germany/Italy/UK/US
- Publisher: W. W. Norton & Company
- Publication date: 18 June 2019
- Publication place: Nigeria
- Media type: Print (hardback)
- Pages: 288
- ISBN: 978-0-393-23959-1
- Preceded by: The Chibok Girls

Travelers is a 2019 novel by Nigerian author Helon Habila. It was published by W. W. Norton & Company. The story revolves around the life of a Nigerian expatriate who travels around Europe to know more about African refugees.

== Plot ==
Travelers is about a Nigerian graduate student living in the United States who relocates to Berlin with his wife Gina, who has won a prestigious arts fellowship. In Berlin, he meets the community of African refugees and encounters with his identity and the privilege of being able to travel freely. Due to racial problems, he divorces with his wife and decides to travel around Europe in order to meet with more African refugees.

== Characters ==
- Gina – the narrator's wife
- Mark – a Malawian transgender student who is the narrator's friend
- Manu – a Libyan surgeon of Nigerian extraction who the narrator meets in Berlin
- Portia – the daughter of a Zambian writer
- Juma
- Karim
- Flaubert

== Reception and award ==
Emad Mirmotahari of World Literature Today wrote that the novel "refuses nostalgia for the cultural energies of African decolonization and the restorative promise of pan-Africanism". Washington City Paper described it as a novel that "does not deal in stereotypes". Otosirieze Obi-Young of Brittle Paper commented that it "appears to be aiming for a kind of completeness". Edward Docx writing for The Guardian felt that it was "replete with literary references that twist and gleam through the narrative, adding light and riches and setting off unexpected resonances". It was shortlisted for the 2019 Grand Prix of Literary Associations. and was also shortlisted for the 2020 James Tait Black Memorial Prize.
