= Bibi Bakare-Yusuf =

Nigerian academic (born 1970)

Bibi Bakare-Yusuf Hon. FRSL
- Born: 1970 (age 55–56); Lagos, Nigeria
- Education: Goldsmith College, University of London; University of Warwick (PhD)
- Occupations: Academic, writer and editor and publisher
- Known for: Co-founder of Cassava Republic Press

Bibi Bakare-Yusuf Hon. FRSL (born 1970) is a Nigerian academic, writer and editor from Lagos, Nigeria. She co-founded the publishing company Cassava Republic Press in 2006, in Abuja with Jeremy Weate. Cassava Republic Press was created with a focus on affordability, the need to find and develop local talent, and to publish African writers too often celebrated only in Europe and America. Bakare-Yusuf was elected an Honorary Fellow of the Royal Society of Literature in 2019, as well as having been selected as a Yale World Fellow, a Desmond Tutu Fellow and a Frankfurt Book Fair Fellow.

== Early life and education ==
Bibi Bakare-Yusuf was born in Lagos, Nigeria, but moved to England when she was 13 years old. She attended Goldsmith College, University of London, where she studied Communication and Anthropology, and gained a PhD in Gender Studies from the University of Warwick.

== Career and creation of Cassava Republic Press ==
In 2006, Bakare-Yusuf — who at the time was an academic in the UK and Nigeria — set up a company with Jeremy Weate to produce high-quality African literature at a price that would enable it to be enjoyed by as wide an audience as possible. They had no business or publishing experience, "just passion and a desire to see African stories written and owned by Africans. Inspirational figures in publishing such as Margaret Busby, co-founder of Allison & Busby, were our guide", as Bakare-Yusuf has said: "The internet, Margaret Busby, and many mistakes were my greatest teachers!" She recalls,

"When I moved to Nigeria as an academic, there were all these interesting African writers being published abroad, and they're not available locally.... So I decided, 'okay, I'm going to start a publishing company’. Cassava Republic Press. I knew nothing, nothing nothing nothing, about publishing! I knew everything about reading and writing, but nothing about the business of publishing. 150 million people. 77 million of them young people under 30. How do we get those people reading? Those are the people I'm actually interested in converting. We want to convert minds. We want to convert them to question who they are, and also question society."

Explaining the company's name, she says: "Cassava is a relatively affordable but nutritious food crop found across West Africa and in the African diaspora. I wanted a publishing house that will connect Africa to itself and its diaspora and vice versa. The idea of a Republic implies the end of a monarchy and a fresh start.... The strapline or slogan for the company is 'Feeding the African Imagination', which fits nicely with our brand name."

Bakare-Yusuf emphasises the need for Africans to be instrumental in publishing as well as writing books: "We started Cassava Republic Press because we wanted Africans to own the means of production, to be in charge of the storytelling and not just writing the stories but to own the facilities and the infrastructure for telling the stories."

Headquartered in Abuja, Nigeria, Cassava Republic has built a reputation primarily for literary fiction (with authors including winners of the Caine Prize, Commonwealth Writers' Prize and Orange Prize) but also for fiction in other genres, such as crime. In addition, the list includes books for children and young adults, and several titles have been on Nigeria's national curriculum. Among notable authors published by the company are Sarah Ladipo Manyika, Lola Shoneyin, Teju Cole, Helon Habila, Elnathan John, Adaobi Tricia Nwaubani, Mũkoma wa Ngũgĩ, Chigozie Obioma, Abubakar Adam Ibrahim, Christie Watson, John Collins, Sade Adeniran, Toni Kan, Doreen Baingana, and others.

In 2014, an associated imprint called Ankara Press was launched, with titles available in digital form as e-books, aiming to publish "a new kind of romance" that challenges conventional stereotypes, reflecting the lives and aspirations of modern African women and men: "We want scenarios that discard dangerous notions of male dominance, control and manipulation. Above all, we want writers who will allow African women to see the best version of themselves in print." Founder Bakare-Yusuf has said: "I felt that our ideas about African literature needed to be more diverse.... We don’t think of African literature in terms of genre fiction. Yet, genre fiction is the mainstay of many publishing houses all over the world."

In November 2016, Bakare-Yusuf started a non-governmental organization, The Initiative for Equal Rights (TIERS), working to improve and protect human rights on minorities in Nigeria and West Africa.

== Honours ==
- In December 2018, literary blog Brittle Paper chose Bibi Bakare-Yusuf as African Literary Person of the Year, an award that "recognizes individuals who work behind the scenes to hold up the African literary establishment in the given year".
- Bakare-Yusuf was selected to give the keynote address at the third Abantu Book Festival in Soweto, South Africa, in 2018.
- In 2019, Bakare-Yusuf was elected an Honorary Fellow of the Royal Society of Literature.
- In 2020, Bakare-Yusuf won the ASAUK "Distinguished Africanist" award, which pays tribute to people who have made exceptional contributions to the field of African studies.
