= Be(com)ing Nigerian =

2019 novel by Elnathan John

- First edition
- Author: Elnathan John
- Language: English
- Genre: Literary Fiction, Satire
- Publisher: Cassava Republic(first edition)
- Publication date: 6 February 2019 (Nigeria) July 2019
- Publication place: Nigeria
- Media type: Print (paperback)
- Pages: 150 pp (first edition)
- ISBN: 9781980079293 (first edition)
- OCLC: 1083272321
- Preceded by: Born on a Tuesday

Becoming Nigerian styled as Be(com)ing Nigerian: ~~A Guide~~ is a 2019 novel by Nigerian satirist Elnathan John. It is his second novel. It was published in 2019 by Cassava Republic.

== Plot summary ==
Elnathan John discusses elections, Nigerian politics, the Nigerian police, healthcare, and "the hustle."

The 150-page book serves as a roadmap for any Nigerian to study oneself, playfully at first, then deeply, with the purpose of generating change on both the individual and corporate levels.

== Reception ==
- Top 10 Nigerian Books of 2019 by Channels Television.
