= Ghost Season =

2023 novel by Fatin Abbas

Ghost Season is a 2023 fiction novel by Sudanese-American writer Fatin Abbas. Abbas debut novel, it is set in Saraaya, a fictional town "when the northern and southern parts of Sudan, still together, are soon to be engulfed by conflict and terror."

Ghost Season was included in Brittle Paper's 100 Notable Books of 2023.

== Background and publication ==
Fatin Abbas in an interview with 500 Words Magazine noted that: "Ghost Season is an attempt to make sense of my place of origins, as a diasporic Sudanese who has always looked back to Sudan and has always felt connected to what is now two countries—Sudan and South Sudan". The novel is set in Saraaya, a fictional town "when the northern and southern parts of Sudan, still together, are soon to be engulfed by conflict and terror."

Abbas began writing the novel in 2015. It was released in Canada and the UK in 2023, and in a German translation in 2024.

== Reception ==
Sulaiman Addonia writing for The New York Times wrote that Abbas "mastered the courage to dive deep into Sudan’s wounds and taboos" and that "the stories of civilians in the grip of uncertainty make for a haunting account and a daring debut." Michael Sears writing for the New York Journal of Books called Ghost Season a "wonderful debut from a truly talented writer" which summarising that "Abbas has drawn a rich and believable cast of characters, and we feel sympathy and involvement with them all." Angela Ajayi writing for the Star Tribune praised the settings and the characters.

Ghost Season was included in Brittle Paper's 100 Notable Books of 2023.
