= Do Not Say It's Not Your Country =

2019 anthology by Nnamdi Oguike

- Author: Nnamdi Oguike
- Publisher: Griots Lounge
- Publication date: 2019-03-01
- ISBN: 978-9789688272

Do Not Say It's Not Your Country is a collection of twelve short stories by Nigerian author Nnamdi Oguike and published by Griots Lounge in 2019. The collection contains twelve stories, each set in a different African country. It has been compared favourably to Uwem Akpan's Say You're One of Them by Brittle Paper. In 2019, it won the Miles Morland Foundation Writing Scholarship.
