= Rasna Warah =

Kenyan writer (1962–2025)

- Detail of self-portrait photograph
- Born: 1962
- Died: 11 January 2025 (aged 62–63); Kenya
- Citizenship: Kenyan
- Education: Suffolk University (BSc psychology and women's studies), Malmö University (Master's degree in Communication)
- Occupations: Author, writer, editor

Rasna Warah (1962 – 11 January 2025) was a Kenyan writer, journalist and author whose work included UNsilenced: Unmasking the United Nations’ Culture of Cover-Ups, Corruption and Impunity, Yesterday it was Asians, today it is Somalis, Tomorrow it could be You, and War Crimes: how warlords, politicians, foreign governments and aid agencies conspired to create a failed state in Somalia.

== Early life and education ==
Warah was born in Nairobi in 1962, and went to a boarding school in Naini Tal in northern India. She had a bachelor's degree in psychology and women's studies from Suffolk University in Boston, United States, where she spent 5 years and a master's in communication for development from Malmö University Sweden. She also spent a year living in London, England, where she found "the weather and the coldness of the people are quite alienating".

== Career ==
She worked an editor at the United Nations Human Settlements Programme (UN-Habitat).

Warah wrote weekly article for The Daily Nation for 12-year, The Elephant for years and carried out numerous writing gigs for Debunk Media, the Mail and Guardian, The Guardian, Africa Is A Country, and The EastAfrican.

== Death ==
Rasna Warah died of cancer on 11 January 2025 in Kenya.

In tributes following her death, Warah was widely praised for her incisive and principled writing, her sustained critique of political power and corruption, and her long-standing commitment to social justice issues, including feminism, environmental concerns, and economic inequality in Africa. She was also recognised for mentoring younger writers and for consistently using journalism and essay writing to amplify marginalised voices and promote public accountability.

== Selected publications ==
- Warah, Rasna (2016). UNsilenced: Unmasking the United Nations’ Culture of Cover-Ups, Corruption and Impunity. AuthorHouse. ISBN 978-1-5049-9993-9.
- Warah, Rasna (11 May 2014). "Yesterday it was Asians, today it is Somalis, Tomorrow it could be You". Sunday Nation.
- Warah, Rasna (2014). War Crimes: how warlords, politicians, foreign governments and aid agencies conspired to create a failed state in Somalia. Author House. ISBN 978-1-4969-8281-0.
- Warah, Rasna (2012). Mogadishu Then and Now: A Pictorial Tribute to Africa's Most Wounded City. AuthorHouse. ISBN 978-1-4772-2903-3.
- Warah, Rasna (2011). Red Soil and Roasted Maize: Selected Essays and Articles on Contemporary Kenya. AuthorHouse. ISBN 978-1-4567-7725-8.
- Warah, Rasna (2008). Missionaries, Mercenaries and Misfits: An Anthology. Author House. ISBN 978-1-4670-2276-7.
- Warah, Rasna (1998). Triple Heritage: A Journey to Self-discovery. R. Warah. ISBN 978-9966-9974-9-4.

== See also ==
- Munira Hussein
- Tony Mochama
- Yvonne Adhiambo Owuor
