= Fatin Abbas =

Sudanese-American academic and fiction writer (born 1982)

- فاتن عباس
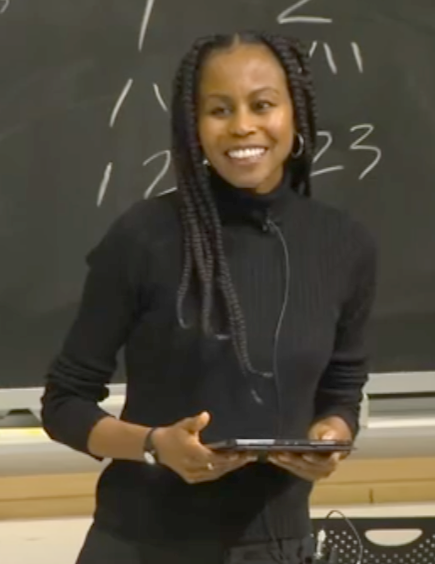
- At a literary discussion at MIT in 2023
- Born: Khartoum, Sudan
- Citizenship: Sudan, United States of America
- Education: University of Cambridge, Harvard University, City University of New York
- Occupations: Fiction writer, cultural essayist and academic
- Writing career
- Years active: 2009–present
- Notable work: Ghost Season, 2023 novel
- Notable awards: Miles Morland Foundation Writing Scholarship
- Website: www.fatinabbas.com

Fatin Abbas (Arabic: فاتن عباس) is a Sudanese-American academic and writer. Having spent most of her youth with her family in New York City and for academic studies in the United Kingdom and the US, she has become known for her essays and non-fiction writing about Sudan, as well as for her short stories and her 2023 debut novel Ghost season. After obtaining her PhD in Comparative Literature at Harvard University, she has taught fiction writing at Massachusetts Institute of Technology, at Pratt Institute in the U.S., and Comparative Literature at Bard College in Berlin, Germany.

== Early life and education ==
Abbas was born in Khartoum, where her father was a professor in the University of Khartoum's department of English literature. She grew up in a middle-class family there until the age of eight. Following the military coup by Omar al-Bashir in 1989, her father was imprisoned as a political opponent of the new regime and only released one year later. To escape further persecution, the family went into exile in the US in 1990. Working at the United Nations in New York City, her mother earned a salary for the family.

Abbas lived her teenage years in New York City and experienced racial prejudice against People of Color, as well as the cultural differences between life in Sudan and the US when she returned to Sudan for extended visits. She earned a Bachelor of Arts degree in English literature from the University of Cambridge, a PhD in Comparative Literature from Harvard University, and a Master of Fine Arts in Creative Writing from Hunter College at the City University of New York.

== Career as writer and academic ==
As a non-fiction author, Abbas has written essays, reviews and reports for international media such as The Nation, openDemocracy, the Royal African Society's African Arguments, Bidoun magazine, Le Monde diplomatique, the German Die Zeit online, and Kulturaustausch, a magazine published by the ifa - Institute for Foreign Relations in Germany. For the online magazine Africa is a Country, she wrote a review of the feature film Timbuktu by Mauritanian filmmaker Abderrahmane Sissako.

In her 2015 article "Coming to terms with Sudan's legacy of slavery", she discussed the history of slavery from the early 19th century up to independent Sudan. She outlined how slavery has shaped the prevailing public notions of identity either as Muslim and Arabized northern Sudanese or as southern Sudanese of mainly traditional African or Christian religious beliefs:

[The history of slavery] sheds light on some of the inequalities that have characterised the relationship between the two Sudans. In the north, to this day, the derogatory term for a South Sudanese is 'abid – literally, "slave". This not only points to the kind of discrimination that South Sudanese have had to suffer at the hands of northerners, it also indicates the extent to which the legacy of slavery continued to inform structures of economic, political and social inequality long after the official abolishment of the practice in 1924, and the country's independence in 1956.

— Fatin Abbas, Coming to terms with Sudan's legacy of slavery

In an article published in German, she told the history of Khartoum from the anti-colonial Mahdist state in the latter half of the 19th century to the breaking away of South Sudan from the northern part of the country under the dictatorship of Omar al-Bashir. Further, she has treated topics such as child soldiers and the world-wide proliferation of small arms.

Her short fiction has appeared in magazines such as Granta, Freeman's, The MIT Technology Review, The Warwick Review, and Friction. Her 2023 debut novel Ghost Season is based on the author's personal experience of working for an NGO in the border region between northern and southern Sudan and set in the fictitious village Saaraya, a "flashpoint in the civil war between the Southern rebel movement and the Northern government based in Khartoum."

Abbas has taught Creative Writing in the department of Comparative Media Studies/Writing at Massachusetts Institute of Technology and at Pratt Institute in the US, as well as Comparative Literature at Bard College Berlin, Germany, where she currently lives. Her 2012 PhD thesis at Harvard was titled Class, Gender and Indigeneity as Counter-discourses in the African Novel: Achebe, Ngugi, Emecheta, Sow Fall and Ali. In 2014, she published a literary review of a novel by Egyptian writer Idris Ali discussing Arab Nationalism and Nubian diasporic identity. Her research is centered on histories of the African diaspora, gender in African and Arabic literature, post-independence nation states, as well as colonialism and globalization in African and Middle Eastern literature and film.

== Works ==
- Mud Missive. Documentary film, 2009
- "Womb Memories". Short story, published in The Warwick Review, Dec 2011
- "The Circumcision". Short story, published by openDemocracy, 2012
- Ghost Season. Novel. W.W. Norton, US & Canada; Jacaranda, UK, 2023, ISBN 978-1-324-00174-4.
- Black Time: Scritti sull’Invisibile / Essays on the Invisible. Translated by Paolo Bassotti; Wetlands Books 2025

== Awards and recognition ==
During her studies at the City University of New York, Abbas was awarded both the Bernard Cohen Short Story Prize and the Miriam Weinberg Richter Award. She has been a Miles Morland Foundation Writing Scholar in the United Kingdom, a Fellow at the Akademie Schloss Solitude and at Schloss Wiepersdorf cultural foundation in Germany, a Writer-in-Residence at the Jan Michalski Foundation in Switzerland, a Maison Baldwin St. Paul de Vence Writer-in-Residence in France, an Austrian Federal Chancellery/KulturKontakt Artist-in-Residence, as well as a Mophradat writing sabbatical awardee in Belgium.

== Reception ==
In a book review of Ghost Season for The New York Times, Eritrea-born British writer Sulaiman Addonia wrote that Abbas "mastered the courage to dive deep into Sudan's wounds and taboos" and that "the stories of civilians in the grip of uncertainty make for a haunting account and a daring debut." Further reviews appeared in the Sudanese 500 Words Magazine, the New York Journal of Books, the Orange County Register and the Star Tribune of Minneapolis, which praised her "great care and attention to place and character."

At the core of Abbas' novel, however, are those ethical questions that often help gird societal progress, including how we confront violence against women. Each character in the novel must grapple with the right thing to do, and given the stakes, the right thing to do is never easy in war, or after a fragile ceasefire.

— Angela Ajayi, writer and critic for the Star Tribune, Review: 'Ghost Season,' by Fatin Abbas

Further, Ghost Season was selected by Brittle paper literary magazine as one of the 100 Notable African Books of 2023.

In June 2025, it was announced that a movie based on Ghost Season will be produced by Michael Bronner and Bhakti Shringarpure. South Sudanese documentary filmmaker Akuol de Mabior (No Simple Way Home) is going to write the scenario and direct the movie.

== See also ==
- Sudanese literature
- List of Sudanese writers
- Modern Arabic literature
