= On Ajayi Crowther Street =

2019 graphic novel by Elnathan John and Alaba Onajin

On Àjàyí Crowther Street
- Author: Elnathan John
- Illustrator: Alábá Onajin
- Language: English
- Genre: Graphic novel
- Publisher: Cassava Republic Press
- Publication date: 2019-11-26
- Publication place: Nigeria
- Media type: Print(Hardcover)
- ISBN: 1911115901

On Ajayi Crowther Street is a 2019 graphic novel by Elnathan John and illustrated by Alaba Onajin. It was published by Cassava Republic Press.

== Plot ==
The book centers on the lives of residents of fictional Àjàyí Crowther Street set in Lagos, Nigeria. The novel primarily explores the life and deeds of Reverend Akpoborie and his family, while also addressing themes relating to societal occurrences in Africa. Its main themes are Religious Hypocrisy, Homosexuality, Homophobia and Family Dynamics.
