= Miles Morland Foundation Writing Scholarship =

Annual scholarship for African writers

The Miles Morland Foundation Writing Scholarship, also called the Morland Writing Scholarships or the Miles Morland Writing Scholarship is an annual financial scholarship awarded to four to six African writers to enable them write a fiction or non-fiction book in the English language.

== Character and value ==
The grant is between £18,000 and £27,000 (fiction or non-fiction respectively), given over twelve to eighteen months to each chosen writer. The only requirements are that the writer submit 10,000 words every month and, if they ever get a book contract out of their writing output, donate 20% back to the foundation.

The award was established in 2013 by Miles Morland, a British citizen and philanthropist, through the Miles Morland Foundation (MMF), a UK registered charity which makes grants in areas reflecting its founder's interests.

It is one of the most prestigious writing scholarships on the African continent.

It is currently judged by three writers and publishers: Muthoni Garland, Cassava Republic Press director Bibi Bakare-Yusuf, and Chuma Nwokolo.

== Recipients ==
The prizewinners are as follows:

=== 2013 ===
- Percy Zvomuya (South Africa)
- Doreen Baingana (Uganda)
- Tony Mochama (Kenya)

=== 2014 ===
- Yewande Omotosho (Nigeria)
- Ahmed Khalifa (Egypt)
- Ndinda Kioko (Kenya)
- Simone Haysom (South Africa)

=== 2015 ===
- Noo Saro-Wiwa (Nigeria)
- Bolaji Odofin (Nigeria)
- Fatin Abbas (Sudan)
- Karen Jennings (South Africa)
- Akwaeke Emezi (Nigeria)

=== 2016 ===
- Nneoma Ike-Njoku (Nigeria)
- Lidudumalingani Mqombothi (South Africa)
- Ayesha Harruna Attah (Ghana)
- Abdul Adan (Somalia)

=== 2017 ===
- Alemseged Tesfai (Eritrea)
- F.T.Kola (South Africa)
- Eloghosa Osunde (Nigeria)
- Bryony Rheam (Zimbabwe)
- Elnathan John (Nigeria)

=== 2018 ===
- Edwige Renee Dro (Côte d'Ivoire)
- Kola Tubosun (Nigeria)
- Sibabalwe Oscar Masinyana (South Africa)
- Siphiwe Gloria Ndlovu (Zimbabwe)

=== 2019 ===
- Gloria Mwaniga Odari (Kenya)
- Hawa Jande Golakai (Liberia)
- Nnamdi Oguike (Nigeria)
- Parselelo ole Kantai (Kenya)

=== 2020 ===
- Howard Meh – Buh (Cameroon)
- Kobina Ankomah – Graham (Ghana)
- Okwiri Oduor (Kenya)
- Sarah Uheida (Libya)

=== 2021 ===
- Ope Adedeji (Nigeria)
- Asiya Gaildon (Somalia)
- Refilwe Mofokeng (South Africa)
- Tinashe Mushakanvanhu (Zimbabwe)

=== 2022 ===
- Muhammad L. Kejera (Gambia)
- Neema Komba (Tanzania)
- Chido Muchemwa (Zimbabwe)
- Chika Oduah (Nigeria)
- Lanre Otaiku (Nigeria)

=== 2023 ===
- Rafeeat Aliyu (Nigeria)
- Mubanga Kalimamukwento (Zambia)
- Kiprop Kimutai (Kenya)
- Rémy Ngamije (Rwanda/ Namibia)
