= Open Country Mag =

Nigerian magazine

- Cover of September 2021 with Chimamanda Ngozi Adichie
- Editor-in-chief: Otosirieze Obi-Young
- Categories: African literature, Nollywood, and culture
- Frequency: Online weekly
- First issue: 2020; 6 years ago
- Country: Nigeria
- Based in: Lagos
- Language: English
- Website: opencountrymag.com

Open Country Mag is a Nigerian magazine that covers African literature, the Nigerian film industry, and culture. It was founded in 2020 by writer Otosirieze Obi-Young.

The magazine has been praised for "building a permanent record of African cultural figures through long-form storytelling." The University of Maryland's Department of African and African American Studies has described it as "one of the most important and ambitious platforms for African writers."

== Features ==
Open Country Mag publishes culture journalism, commentary, book and film reviews, new writing, book excerpts, and is reputed for its longform profiles. These include cover story features on writers Chimamanda Ngozi Adichie, Wole Soyinka, Teju Cole, Damon Galgut, Tsitsi Dangarembga, Maaza Mengiste, and Chinelo Okparanta, and actor Rita Dominic.

The publication Communique wrote:

Open Country Mag’s work carries a symbolic and practical significance. It shows what is possible when African publications commit to longform storytelling: that the continent’s writers, thinkers, and cultural figures can be chronicled with nuance, rigour, and ambition. Even if its model is difficult to replicate at scale today, it establishes a blueprint, a proof of concept if you may, that longform in Africa is not only feasible but essential for documenting the intellectual and cultural life of the continent.

Contributors include Dangarembga, Leila Aboulela, Diriye Osman, Chibundu Onuzo, Jamal Mahjoub, and Siphiwe Gloria Ndlovu.

In March 2023, the magazine announced that it was now the publisher of Folio Nigeria, a content platform that was the exclusive media affiliate of CNN in Africa. The same year, Open Country Mag announced a fellowship for African curators.

== See also ==
- List of literary magazines
- List of film magazines
