= Waiting for an Angel =

2002 political novel by Helon Habila

- Author: Helon Habila
- Language: English
- Genre: Literary Fiction, Social novel
- Set in: Nigeria
- Publisher: W. W. Norton & Company
- Publication date: 2002
- Publication place: Nigeria
- Media type: Print (hardcover)
- Pages: 256 pp (first edition)
- ISBN: 0-393-05193-5 (first edition)
- OCLC: 993037824
- Preceded by: Prison Stories
- Followed by: New Writing 14

Waiting for an Angel is a 2002 political novel written by Nigeria writer Helon Habila. It was first published by New York's publishing firm W. W. Norton & Company.

== Plot summary ==
The novel is set during the military rule of General Sani Abacha. It focuses mainly on Lomba; a journalist and editor at The Dial who is imprisoned for fabricating "lies" against the government.

== Reception ==
It won the 2003 Commonwealth Writers' Prize, Africa category Maya Jaggi writing for The Guardian reviewed that: "...(S)ombre, gripping and at times humorous..." that it was "...Cleverly constructed in seven parts, it deftly moves back in time from a period after military rule has ended. (...) In realist vein, the novel's artistry is manifest in the mordant strength and clarity of its language, and its compelling structure. Though the strands are satisfyingly gathered up, each section resembles a short story." For James Urquhart of The Independent "...These unchronological chapters, the feeling of drift in the first half of this book, and Lomba's rather stilted, passionless demeanour, gradually cement into a compressed core of determination to be counted, to resist oppression. (...) Habila's well-crafted novel captures both the sense of mental unbalance of living under a dictatorship and the sacrifices, personal and public, that must be offered to chip away at its ferociously blank face." Dave Gilson of San Francisco Chronicle noted "...Habila's prose is clean and unself-conscious, and he switches easily from dialogues in pidgin to classical references. At times, however, he reveals a fondness for melodrama and tortured imagery. (...) At its best, Habila's writing can be stirring."
