= Measuring Time =

2007 novel by Helon Habila

- Author: Helon Habila
- Language: English
- Genre: Fiction
- Publisher: W. W. Norton & Company
- Publication date: February 17, 2007
- Publication place: Nigeria
- ISBN: 0-393-05251-6

Measuring Time is a 2007 novel by Helon Habila. It follows twin brothers, Mamo and LaMamo, raised in northeastern Nigeria amidst a blend of secularism, Christianity, and tribal tradition. Mamo, a scholar, stays in their village, while LaMamo becomes a soldier in West African wars. As Mamo deals with personal tragedies and moral dilemmas, LaMamo's life unfolds tragically, shaping him into a pace setter for his brother. The novel explores themes of identity, choice, and the interplay of past and present narrative.

In 2008, Measuring Time was nominated for the Hurston/Wright Legacy Award.

== Plot ==
Measuring Time focuses on the tradition, modernity, and spirituality in northeastern Nigeria through the lives of a twin brothers, Mamo and LaMamo. Raised by a controlling father in the village of Keti, the twins navigate a landscape shaped by Nigerian modernity, missionary Christianity, and traditional tribal beliefs. This lifestyle creates a magic-realist backdrop, where the past subtly influences the present without eruptions.

Despite their shared heritage, Mamo and LaMamo embark on different paths. Mamo, afflicted with sickle cell anemia, embodies a sensitive and contemplative nature. He becomes a scholar, working as a school teacher and later as a secretary to a local ruler in Keti. His journey is marked by personal tragedies and a sense of loss, making him a quint essential Nigerian hero with his own moral integrity amidst adversity.

In contrast, LaMamo exudes fearlessness and athleticism. He ventures into the tumultuous world of West African wars as a soldier for hire, leading a violent and tragic life. Through poorly worded letters home, LaMamo's existence takes on a mythic quality for Mamo, representing the untaken path of action over contemplation.

The narrative weaves together the twins' disparate experiences, exploring themes of identity, fate, and the consequences of choice. As Mamo navigates the complexities of his existence, haunted by the spirits of the past and the specter of what could have been, Measuring Time emerges as a poignant exploration of the human condition amidst the flux of history and tradition.

== Setting ==
Measuring Time is primarily set in the village of Keti, located in northeastern Nigeria. This village serves as the upbringing paths of the twin brothers, Mamo and LaMamo. Within Keti, the novel explores various spaces, including the village churchyard, where the spirits of the past linger, and the homes and schools where the brothers navigate their lives. Additionally, the novel briefly ventures into other locations across West Africa, where LaMamo's journey as a soldier takes him. Overall, the setting of Measuring Time is richly depicted, offering a glimpse into the cultural, spiritual, and geographical landscape of northeastern Nigeria.

== Characters ==
- Mamo: The protagonist of the story, Mamo is a complex character who is sensitivity and intelligent. He grapples with the challenges of sickle cell anemia, personal tragedies, and the moral dilemmas of his choices. Portrayed with depth, Mamo's journey serves as the emotional core of the play.
- LaMamo: Mamo's twin brother, LaMamo, represents the antithesis of his sibling's nature. Fearless and athletic, LaMamo's decision to become a soldier leads him down a path of violence and tragedy. Despite his sporadic appearances, LaMamo's presence looms large as a symbol of the road not taken.
- Father: As the controlling and status-obsessed patriarch of the family, Father's influence shapes the upbringing and worldview of his sons. His character embodies traditional values and expectations, serving as a source of conflict and tension within the family dynamic.
- Local Ruler: The authority figure in Keti, the Local Ruler represents the political and social structure of the village. Mamo's role as the ruler's secretary brings him into close proximity with power, providing insight into the complexities of governance and leadership in a rural community.
- Old Woman/Witch: A mysterious and enigmatic figure, the Old Woman/Witch embodies the supernatural elements of the story. Rumored to possess mystical abilities, her presence adds an aura of mysticism and folklore to the narrative, challenging the characters' beliefs and perceptions.
- Various Villagers: Representing the diverse community of Keti, the villagers serve as a collective backdrop to the main narrative. Their interactions and perspectives provide context for the social, cultural, and religious dynamics at play within the village.
- Soldiers: Depicting the chaos and violence of West African wars, the soldiers add a sense of urgency and danger to the story. Their presence highlights the broader geopolitical context in which the characters' lives unfold, underscoring the impact of conflict on individual destinies.
- Spirits: Manifestations of the past and cultural heritage, the spirits and ghosts haunt the characters and the village, reminding them of the interconnectedness of history and memory. Their ethereal presence adds a layer of symbolism and metaphor to the narrative, exploring themes of legacy and ancestry.
- Students: Portraying the pupils in the school where Mamo teaches, the students represent the future generation of Keti. Their interactions with Mamo offer moments of levity and inspiration, highlighting the transformative power of education and mentorship.
- Letter Readers: Characters who read LaMamo's sporadic and poorly worded letters home, providing insight into his experiences as a soldier. These readings serve as narrative devices, offering glimpses into LaMamo's life and the challenges he faces on the battlefield.
- Ensemble: Additional actors who populate the world of the play, portraying background characters and extras. Their presence helps to create a sense of verisimilitude and immersion, bringing the village of Keti to life on stage.

== Reception ==
Hari Kunzru, in The New York Times, stated that the ending that "meanders to a halt" suits the "melancholy narrative".

Christine Thomas, writing for the Chicago Tribune, argues that the work was "ambitious" and the work "has potential", but argued that the "technical and archaic diction" hamper the understanding of the characters.

Kirkus Reviews called the book "unusually rich and rewarding", comparing it to A Portrait of the Artist as a Young Man.
