= Tony Mochama =

Kenyan writer (born 1975)

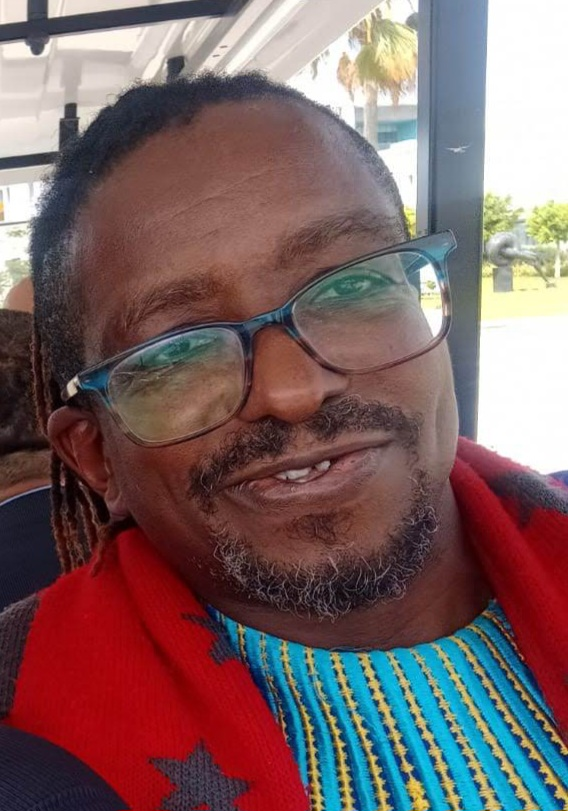
- Mochama in Morocco 2022
- Born: Tony Adam Mochama; 9 May 1975 (age 51)
- Other name: Smitta Smitten
- Citizenship: Kenyan
- Education: Starehe Boys' Centre and School
- Alma mater: Herzen University; University of Nairobi
- Occupations: Author, writer, poet, journalist

Tony Adam Mochama (born 9 May 1975), also known as Smitta Smitten is a Kenyan poet, writer, author and a senior journalist at The Nation Media Group. Mochama is a three-time winner of the Burt Awards for African Young Adult Literature and he is also a recipient of the Miles Morland Writing Scholarship.

== Education ==
Mochama attended Catholic Primary School and graduated in 1993 from the Starehe Boys’ Centre founded by the late Geoffrey Griffin who spotted his creative talent. He studied Law at the University of Nairobi from 1997 until 2001, before shifting his focus to creative writing and journalism. He attended Herzen University Summer Literary Seminars to hone his creative writing between 2003 and 2006.

== Career ==
In the early 2003, Mochama began to work for ‘eXpression Today,’ a bi-weekly newspaper dedicated mostly to the issues of press freedom. He was also a freelance correspondent for The Nation Newspapers, handling human-interest features as well as theatre and book reviews. In the same year, he moved to Standard Media Group (SMG), where he became a senior writer and ran four weekly columns. At the beginning of 2022, Mochama was taken by the Nation Media Group, the largest media conglomerate in the East African region. He has published up to ten books, including A Jacket for Ahmet (2017) and 2063 – Last Mile Bet, Afro-futuristic (2018).

Mochama is the Secretary General of PEN (Kenya), an association of writers and subsidiary of PEN International. He was a Kenyan delegate at the 82nd PEN Congress, Ourense Spain, in 2016. He attended the summer program scholarship under the Summer Literary Seminars (SLS) to study creative writing at the Herzen University, Saint Petersburg, Russia in classes run by creative writers such as George Saunders. Mochama would attend three more SLS seminars between 2004 and 2006, to perfect his craft in both prose and poetry, and in 2019 ran a two-week poetry workshop at the invite of the Goethe Institute in Windhoek for dozens of Namibian poets and creatives.

Since the end of Covid-19 in mid-2021, Mochama has been a panelist every year since at the Rabat International Book Fair in Morocco, and in December 2023, was the only other African poet (besides Prof Wole Soyinka) selected for the 22 world poetry personages at the Shanghai International Poetry Festival in China. He was also the official East African AU @ 60 literary laureate for 2023, and is the Kenyan literary consultant for the International Literary Seminars (ILS) that runs creative workshops in Nairobi and Lamu.

Mochama was a 2013 resident poet at the Ca'Foscari University, Venezia, Italy and a 2019 Emily Harvey Foundation resident writer in Venice, Italy. He has also visited Canada, London, Portugal and (Germany) under different literary activities as a speaker, reader and facilitator.

== Court case ==
In 2014, Mochama was accused of sexually assaulting the Asian-Kenyan poet and feminist activist Shailja Patel. Prof. Wambui Mwangi led the public uproar, which permeated Twitter for days, following the accusation. Later, the Nairobi CID overturned the case by officially concluding it, as both malicious and an afterthought. Mochama then sued Shailja Patel and Prof. Wambui Mwangi for four million Kenyan shillings in punitive damage to his reputation, under the Civil Suit number 399 of 2015. It was announced on the 6th of August 2019 that a Kenyan court absolved and awarded Mochama 9 million shillings for defamation. The court has also ordered both Shalja Patel and Prof Wambui Mwangi to apologise to Mochama through the court within 14 days.

== Literary work ==
- 2021 - "Political Party After Political Party - 60 years of the history of power in Kenya." (Konrad Adenauer Stiftung)
- 2018 – 2063 – Last Mile Bet, Afro-futuristic long novel: Oxford University Press
- 2017 – A Jacket for Ahmet, Burt Award-winning YA novella: East African Educational Publishers
- 2016 – Run, Cheche, Run,, Burt Award-winning YA novella: East African Educational Publishers
- 2015 – Modern Poetry for Secondary Schools, poetry text book:Phoenix Publishers
- 2014 – Nairobi – A Night Guide through the City in the Sun, nocturnal essays: Contact Zones
- 2013 – Meet the Omtitas, Burt Award-winning YA novella: Phoenix Publishers
- 2012 – Percy's Killer Party, a play in the Goethe-Institute-commissioned ‘Six and the City’ series
- 2011 – Princess Adhis and the Naija Coca Brodas, crime noir, Storymoja Publishers
- 2009 – The Road to Eldoret & Other Stories. Published by Kwani?
- 2007 – What If I'm a Literary Gangster?, a poetry collection: Brown Bear Insignia

== Literary Awards ==
Year	Award	Category	Result
2023	Library of Africa and the African Diaspora LOATAD	Official African Union @ 60 EA Author (award sponsored by UNDP).	Declared by AU
2022	Pan African Congress	Spotlight Award	Won
2019	Kenya Film Commission	KFC Script Writers' Competition	Finalist
2017	Burt Awards	Young Adult Literature	Won
2016	Burt Awards	Young Adult Literature	Won
2014	Sanaa Theatre Awards	Best Theatre, Art and Culture Writer	Won
2013	Burt Awards	Young Adult Literature	Won
2013	Miles Morland Foundation Writing Scholarship	Continental Writing Prize	Won
2012	Leapfrog Press Prize	Fiction Contest	Honourable Mention

== See also ==
- Munira Hussein
- Binyavanga Wainaina
- Yvonne Adhiambo Owuor
