= The Chibok Girls =

2016 book by Helon Habila

- Author: Helon Habila
- Language: English
- Subject: 2014 Chibok schoolgirls kidnapping/Boko Haram insurgency
- Genre: Non-fiction
- Publisher: Columbia Global Reports
- Publication date: 5 December 2016
- Publication place: Nigeria
- Pages: 128 (first edition)
- ISBN: 978-0-9971264-6-4
- Preceded by: Travelers

The Chibok Girls styled as The Chibok Girls: The Boko Haram Kidnappings and Islamist Militancy in Nigeria is a 2016 non-fiction book by Nigerian author Helon Habila. It was developed due to 2014 kidnaping of 276 Chibok school girls from age 16 to 18 by the Islamic terrorist group Boko Haram.

== Reception ==
The Guardian described the book as "short and powerful" and that it is "A memorable portrait of individual resilience in a divided, strife-torn nation." Jenny Rogers of The Washington Post described it as a "compelling portrait of a troubled land." The Atlantic described it as a "quietly yet powerfully" novel that "revives the call to take notice." Zaynab Alkali writing for The Guardian Nigeria described the book as "a narration that carries us along a torturous path of sheer terror." Patrick Heardman of Financial Times said that the book "is a fascinating portrait of a community stricken by tragedy and ill-served by successive governments in Abuja." It made the Bustle Magazine's 13 must-read nonfiction books in December 2016.
