= Ainehi Edoro =

Nigerian writer

- Born: 11 December; Akure, Nigeria
- Education: Duke University
- Occupations: Writer, literary critic, academic
- Known for: Founder of Brittle Paper

Ainehi Edoro (born 11 December) is a Nigerian writer, critic and academic. She is the founder and publisher of the African literary blog Brittle Paper. She is currently an assistant professor of Global Black Literatures at the University of Wisconsin-Madison. Her areas of research include 21st-century fiction, literature in digital/social media, The Global Anglophone Novel, African Literature, Contemporary British Fiction, Novel Theory, Political Philosophy, and Digital Humanities.

== Early years and education ==
Edoro was born in Akure, Nigeria, and grew up in Benin City. While working on her doctorate from Duke University, Edoro founded Brittle Paper. Until June 2018, she was assistant professor at Marquette University. Her interests are centered on fictional African literature.

== Career ==
In 2018, Edoro founded Brittle Paper, a literary blog for fans of African literature. Explaining how she came about the name with Jennifer Emelife, she explained: "The brittleness of paper evokes the ephemeral nature of literary work and ideas within the digital space...Brittle Paper is about documenting the life of texts within the social media space." According to Edoro, the dissatisfaction in sharing her literary thoughts with only her academic community was what led her to blogging, however she stated that her objective was to "reinvent African fiction and literary culture".

Edoro is a contributing writer to Africa Is a Country, which is a site of opinion, analysis, and new writing.

== Controversy ==
In April 2020, the deputy editor of Brittle Paper, Otosirieze Obi-Young, stopped working for the publication over an internal editorial dispute. Official statements are unclear and differ as to whether he quit or was fired. The dispute revolved around potential edits to a story about Hadiza Isma El-Rufai, a novelist and wife of Kaduna state governor Mallam Nasir El-Rufai. Hadiza Isma El-Rufai had defended her son's threat to gang-rape a Twitter user during an argument on the social network, saying "Sow the wind, reap the whirlwind. All is fair in love and war" when alerted to her son Bello's comments, before later apologizing. The editor and deputy editor of Brittle Paper were not able to come to an agreement about edits to the Brittle Paper post, so the post was taken down, accompanied by a short statement. The next day, Obi-Young ignited a social media controversy with a public statement posted to his blog. The statement included unverified accusations against Brittle Paper and its editor, and spawned conspiracy theories on Twitter. The editor of Brittle Paper responded to the controversy in a statement on 15 April 2020, in which she denied the accusations. Responding to Obi-Young's accusations of censorship and misogyny, the editor pointed to Brittle Paper's 10-year track record of publishing similarly controversial stories, supporting women's issues, and standing against censorship.

== Publications ==
- "Achebe's Evil Forest: Space, Violence, and Order in Things Fall Apart Journal of Postcolonial Enquiry", The Cambridge Journal of Postcolonial Literary Inquiry, April 2018.
- "How not to talk about African fiction", The Guardian, 6 April 2016.
- "Gods of Fiction: African Writers and the Fantasy of Power", Africa Is a Country.
- "Africa is a country in Wakanda", Africa Is a Country.

== Awards and honors ==
In 2018, Edoro was listed on OkayAfrica's "100 Women".

She was also listed as one of the five most influential Nigerian women in 2016 by the Guardian.

In 2016, her writings were published in British newspaper The Guardian, where she observed discrimination in the perception of African writers by some stakeholders in the literary circle.

In June 2018, Edoro was the lead judge at GTBank's writing contest. She is also the announcer of the African literary person of the year through Brittle Paper.
