= Elnathan John =

Nigerian novelist, satirist and lawyer (born 1982)

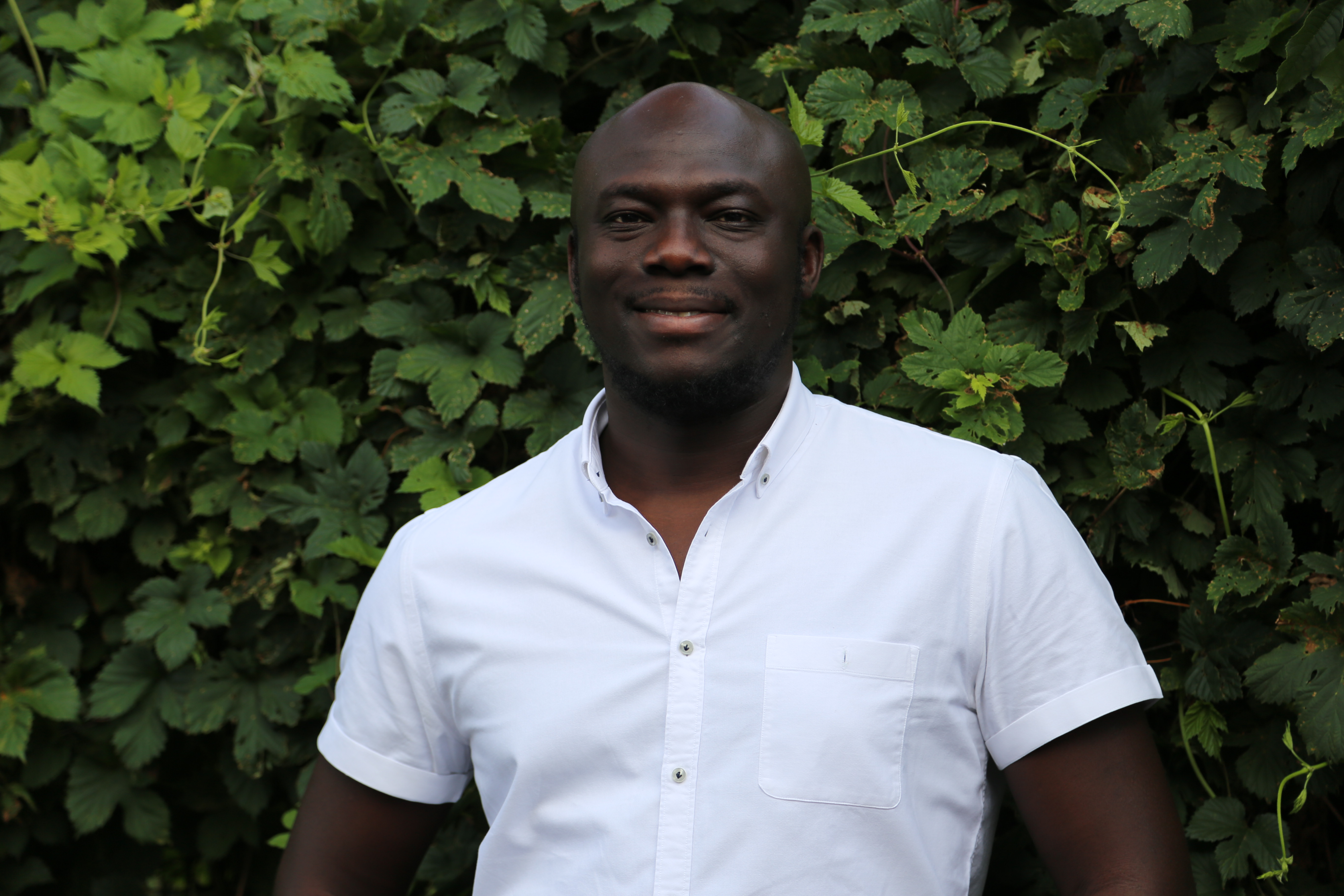
- Picture of Elnathan John
- Born: 1982 (age 43–44); Kaduna, Nigeria
- Education: Ahmadu Bello University, Zaria, Nigeria
- Occupations: Writer (English, Hausa)
- Notable work: Born on a Tuesday, Be(com)ing Nigerian
- Awards: Betty Trask Award

Elnathan John (born 1982) is a Nigerian novelist, satirist and lawyer whose stories have twice been shortlisted for the Caine Prize for African Writing.

== Career ==
Elnathan John was born in Kaduna, in north-west Nigeria, in 1982. He attended Ahmadu Bello University, Zaria, and the Nigerian Law School, where he obtained law degrees.

His short story Bayan Layi, published in Per Contra, was shortlisted for the Caine Prize for African Writing in 2013. He was shortlisted again for the Caine Prize in 2015 for his short story Flying.

His writing has been published in The Economist, The Guardian, Per Contra, Hazlitt, ZAM Magazine, Evergreen Review, and Chimurenga's The Chronic.

John's first novel, Born on a Tuesday was published in 2016 by Cassava Republic Press in 2015 and in the US by Grove Atlantic. Born on a Tuesday was shortlisted in September 2016 for the NLNG Nigeria Prize for Literature, Africa's largest literary award it won a Betty Trask Award. Translated into French as Né un mardi by Céline Schwaller, it received the Les Afriques prize in 2019.

His second book, Be(com)ing Nigerian, A Guide, a collection of satirical pieces, was published by Cassava Republic Press in 2019.

His third book, a graphic novel, was published by Cassava Republic Press in November 2019. The book is illustrated by Alaba Onajin.

Elnathan John is a Civitella Ranieri Fellow. He writes a weekly satirical column for the Sunday Trust Newspaper and speaks regularly on Nigerian literature, media and politics. He is one of the judges of the 2019 Man Booker International Prize.

== Controversy ==
In a 2013 interview with Boston Review, Chimamanda Ngozi Adichie referred to John, a Caine Prize for African Writing nominee, as "one my boys," a remark that generated discussion within literary circles. In response, John published a satirical essay titled The Consequences of Loving Ngozi.

In 2016, John and Binyavanga Wainaina engaged in a public exchange on social media regarding Adichie. The dispute attracted attention within African literary communities and prompted Ainehi Edoro, founder of Brittle Paper, to publish a commentary calling for an end to the feud.

== Awards and listings ==
- 2013: Shortlisted for the Caine Prize for African Writing
- 2015: Shortlisted for the Caine Prize for African Writing
- 2016: Shortlisted for the Nigeria Prize for Literature
- 2017: Longlisted for the Etisalat Prize for African Literature
- 2017: Shortlisted for the Republic of Consciousness Prize
- 2017: WINNER Betty Trask Award
- 2018: Miles Morland Writing Scholarship
- 2019: WINNER Prix Les Afriques

== Bibliography ==
- Bayan Layi (2013)
- Flying (2015)
- Born on a Tuesday (2016)
- Be(com)ing Nigerian (2019)
- On Ajayi Crowther Street (2019)
