= Lidudumalingani Mqombothi =

South African writer

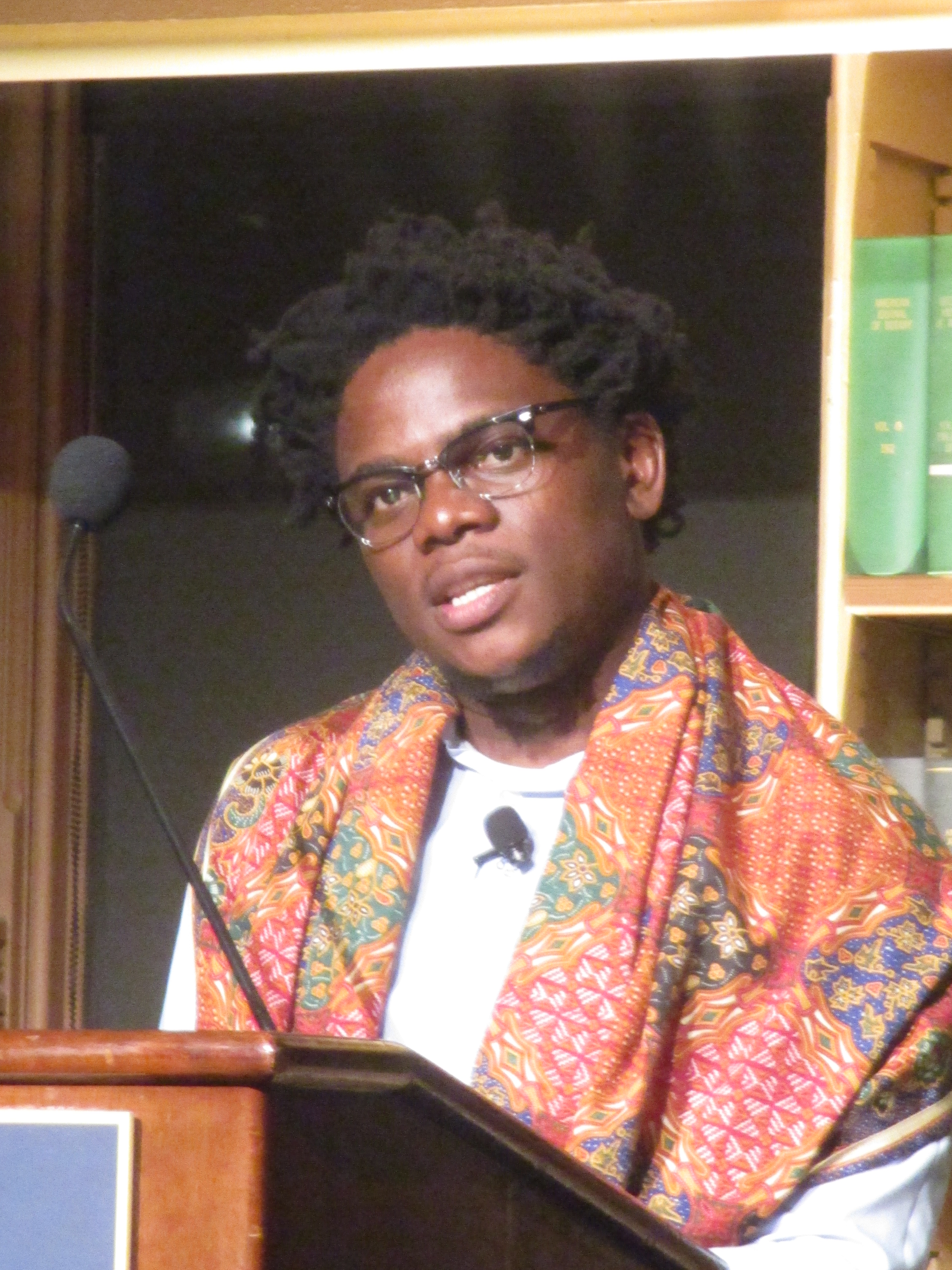
- Born: Zikhovane, Eastern Cape, South Africa
- Occupations: Writer, filmmaker and photographer
- Writing career
- Language: English
- Genres: Short story; non-fiction; criticism
- Notable work: "Memories We Lost"
- Notable awards: Caine Prize for African Writing, 2016
- Website: www.lidudumalingani.com

Lidudumalingani Mqombothi is a South African writer, film-maker and photographer. His short story "Memories We Lost" won the 2016 Caine Prize for African Writing.

== Biography ==
Lidudumalingani Mqombothi was born in the village of Zikhovane in the Eastern Cape, South Africa. He was the 2016 winner of the Caine Prize for African Writing with his short story "Memories We Lost". As part of winning the prize, he visited Georgetown University in Washington, DC, for a series of events, including seminars and readings. Also in 2016, Lidudumalingani was selected to receive a Miles Morland Scholarship, enabling him to work on his first novel, Let Your Children Name Themselves.

Lidudumalingani was chosen as curator for the 2022 African Book Festival Berlin (26–18 August), with the theme of his programme being titled "Yesterday. Today. Tomorrow."

== Awards and honours ==
- 2016: Caine Prize winner for "Memories We Lost"
- 2016: Miles Morland Scholarship

== Selected writings ==
- "Goodbye John Shoes Moshoeu", Africa Is A Country, 22 April 2015.
- "The Art of Suspense", The Chimurenga Chronic, 7 April 2016.
- "The Seduction of Johannesburg", caineprize.com, 14 November 2016.
- "The Portfolio", Mail & Guardian, 29 November 2019.
- "Notes on migration, the city and home", Johannesburg Review of Books, 5 December 2019.
- "Writers do not write alone. They are always in the company of other writers", Johannesburg Review of Books, 3 July 2020.
- "A city caught between two moments", Johannesburg Review of Books, 27 August 2020.
