= Prison Stories =

2000 short story collection by Helon Habila

- First edition
- Author: Helon Habila
- Language: English
- Genre: Literary Fiction, Social novel
- Set in: Nigeria
- Publisher: Epic Books
- Publication date: 2000
- Publication place: Nigeria
- Media type: Print (hardcover)
- Pages: 153 pp (first edition)
- ISBN: 9789783039728 (first edition)
- OCLC: 50069353

Prison Stories, styled as Prison Stories: A Collection of Short Storie[s], is a collection of prison stories by Nigerian writer Helon Habila. "Love Poem", which is among the stories included in the collection, won the 2001 Caine Prize for African Writing. It was first published by Epic Books.

== Plot summary ==
The book is a collection of short stories about the brutal life faced by prisoners in prison, mostly by those are innocent.
