= Munira Hussein =

Kenyan writer

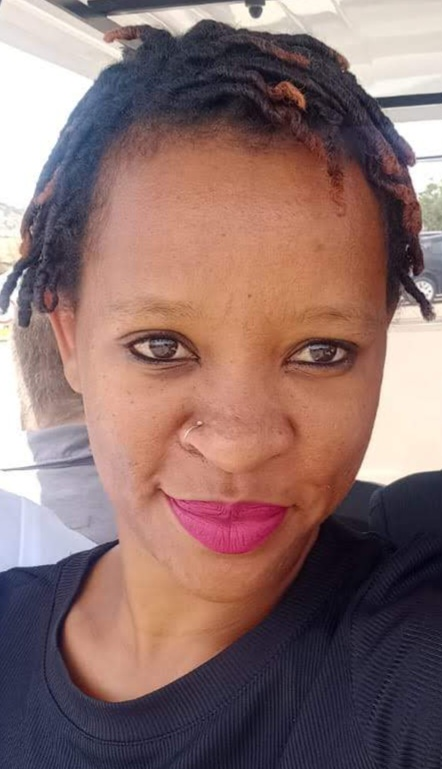
- Hussein in Morocco 2022
- Born: Marsabit County, Kenya
- Citizenship: Kenyan
- Education: Kenyatta University (BSc Microbiology)
- Occupations: Writer and editor
- Website: munirahussein.com

Munira Hussein, also known as The Contemporary Nomad, is a Kenyan writer, author, and editor. She is known for fiction, poetry, short story collections, and contributions to educational publications used in East African schools. Her work often explores themes related to society, identity, and the human experience.

== Early life and education ==
Hussein was born in Marsabit County in Northern Kenya, and grew up in a culturally diverse and conservative environment, which later influenced her writing. She pursued a Bachelor of Science degree in microbiology at Kenyatta University before transitioning into full-time writing and literary work.

== Career ==
Hussein began her creative journey by writing at a young age, beginning with a 200-page handwritten book during her final year in high school. She has published multiple works spanning short stories, poetry, and educational texts. Her books and co-authored work include Unfit for Society, Through the Journey of Hope, and When a Stranger Called.

Hussein also works as an editor and public speaker, often emphasising the power of storytelling for cultural reflection and social change. In 2022, Hussein alongside Gladwell Pamba and Dennis Mugaa won a manuscript contest put together by Concordia University as part of the International Literary Seminars (ILS) Kenya.

== Themes and style ==
Hussein's writing typically explores social issues, personal identity, and the experience of growing up in Northern Kenya, blending emotional depth with sharp observation of societal norms.

== Selected literary works ==
- Seeing Our Sisters (co-authored anthology, 2024)
- Highland Cactus (c. 2022–2023)
- When a Stranger Called (2020)
- A Curve of Darkness (2019)
- Unfit for Society (2018)
- Through the Journey of Hope (poetry anthology)
- Pace in Poetry (poetry anthology)

=== Educational publications ===
- English Literacy Grade 1
- English Literacy Grade 2
- English Literacy Grade 3

== Awards and recognition ==
- International Literary Seminars Fellowship (2022)
- Shortlisted for the Writing Gender Residency, Huza Press and Goethe-Institut Kigali (2021)
- Shortlisted for the African Writers Award (2018)

== See also ==
- Rasna Warah
- Billy Kahora
- Yvonne Adhiambo Owuor
