= Sade Adeniran =

Nigerian novelist

- Born: London, England
- Education: Plymouth University; University of Massachusetts
- Occupation: Novelist
- Notable work: Imagine This (2007)
- Awards: 2008 Commonwealth Writers' Prize for Best First Book (African region)
- Website: sades-world.com

Sade Adeniran is a Nigerian novelist, whose debut novel, Imagine This, won the 2008 Commonwealth Writers' Prize for Best First Book in Africa. Imagine This was originally self-published by the author. Based in London, she is also a filmmaker.

== Biography ==
Sade Adeniran was born in London, England, to Nigerian parents, and at the age of eight was taken back to her father's village in Nigeria, spending her formative years living with her grandmother in Idogun, Ondo State, before returning to the UK.

Adeniran earned degrees in Media and English from Plymouth University and also studied in the United States as an exchange student at the University of Massachusetts. She began her writing career with a radio play written for a final-year university project and entitled Memories of a Distant Past; she submitted "on a whim" to the BBC, and it was produced in BBC Radio 4's "First Bite" Festival. She subsequently wrote other theatre pieces, having her work performed in London at the Lyric Theatre, the Bush Theatre and the Riverside Studios.

She was employed as a business change consultant, while also working for five years on her first novel, Imagine This, describing the book's route to publication in the Brunel University newsletter Brunel Link in 2009: "Like most writers who dream of seeing their book in print, I went down the traditional route of sending my manuscript to publishers and agents but the responses were not positive – there didn't seem to be room in the marketplace for a story of a young girl growing up in rural Nigeria. After years of trying to repress my dream of becoming a published author, I finally plucked up the courage to do something. I realised that if I didn't believe in myself, no-one else would." Having left her job, she decided to self-publish and in order to sell the 1100 copies she had printed, she created a website and dedicated herself to a marketing campaign that included appearances on local radio and television.

Told through her diaries, Imagine This chronicles 10 years of the life of Lola, who is sent as a nine-year-old from her home in London to live with relatives in Nigeria. In answer to whether the story is autobiographical, Adeniran says her response is always: "'It is and it isn't'. Some things in the book are based on real incidents. That village was where I grew up, but what happens to the character Lola is not what happened to me." The novel won the 2008 Commonwealth Writers' Prize for Best First Book (African region), and was shortlisted for the World Book Day "Books to Talk About" award. It was published by Cassava Republic Press in 2011.

As a filmmaker, Adeniran is currently developing an adapted version of her novel, which reached the second round of the Sundance Screenwriters' Lab, and won the British Urban Film Festival Award for Best Script Talent. Her second film project is entitled A Mother's Journey, and she is working on others.

She is a contributor to the 2019 anthology New Daughters of Africa, edited by Margaret Busby.

== Bibliography ==
- Imagine This, SW Books, 2007, ISBN 978-0-9555453-0-6. Cassava Republic Press, 2011, ISBN 978 9784894357.
