= Born on a Tuesday =

2016 novel by Elnathan John

- First edition
- Author: Elnathan John
- Language: English
- Genre: Literary Fiction
- Publisher: Grove Press (first edition)
- Publication date: 3 May 2016
- Publication place: Nigeria
- Media type: Print (paperback)
- Pages: 256 pp (first edition)
- ISBN: 978-0-8021-2482-1 (first edition)
- OCLC: 1082440089
- Followed by: Be(com)ing Nigerian

Born on a Tuesday is a 2016 novel by Nigeria writer Elnathan John. It is his debut novel. It was published in 2016 by Black Cat an imprint of Grove Press.

== Plot summary ==
Dantala is the protagonist of Born on a Tuesday— a story about life, love, friendship, and loss— a young boy from a Sheikh household who attempts to navigate religious and political divides in North West Nigeria.

Dantala resided among a street gang that planned to disrupt an election, which backfired and forced Dantala to flee for his life.

== Reception ==
On 2016, it was shortlisted for the Nigeria Prize for Literature. Also, on 2017, it was Longlisted for the 9mobile Prize for Literature. It was also shortlisted for the Republic of Consciousness Prize, He also won Betty Trask Award for Born on a Tuesday. It made to the Top 10 Nigerian Books of 2019 by Channels Television.
