= Otosirieze Obi-Young =

Nigerian writer and editor (born 1994)

- Born: 1994 (age 31–32); Aba, Abia State, Nigeria
- Education: University of Nigeria, Nsukka, University of Iowa
- Occupations: Writer, editor, journalist, curator
- Organization(s): Folio Nigeria, Open Country Mag
- Website: otosirieze.com

Otosirieze Obi-Young (born 1994) is a Nigerian writer, editor, culture journalist and curator. He is editor of Open Country Mag. He was editor of Folio Nigeria, a then CNN affiliate, and former deputy editor of Brittle Paper. In 2019, he won the inaugural The Future Awards Africa Prize for Literature. He has been described as among the "top curators and editors from Africa."

== Career ==
Obi-Young was born in Aba, Nigeria. He studied at the University of Nigeria, Nsukka. He taught at Godfrey Okoye University, Enugu. He attended the Iowa Writers' Workshop.

He has served on the judging panel of the Gerald Kraak Prize, an initiative for writing and visual art about on gender, social justice and sexuality. He was a judge for the Miles Morland Foundation Writing Scholarship. He was non-fiction editor at 14, Nigeria's first queer art collective. He is the founder of the Art Naija Series anthologies, which include Enter Naija: The Book of Places and Work Naija: The Book of Vocations.

=== Views on LGBTQ literature ===
Obi-Young is an advocate for LGBTQ writing in Africa. He has written: "To write literature humanizing queerness is only as political as it is not, because it is grounded in lived experience. How can one un-robbed of empathy say that to show these lives in literature is a 'political concession'?" He expressed scepticism about the marketing category of LGBT literature because "it has no counter-reference":

"Why should literature exploring same-sex desire be categorized based on who its characters find themselves loving or on who its writers themselves love, especially as such categorization is withheld from literature exploring desire for the opposite sex? It takes focus away from the skill of its writers and pushes it to their subject, a denial not bestowed on writers of 'heterosexual literature'."

=== Views on contemporary African literature ===
In 2018, Obi-Young used the term "the confessional generation" to describe his generation of African writers. He has said:

"The next generation of writers, the ones who began to blossom last year and would peak in five years’ time, is dominated by people who are either queer or female and who have already begun to revolt against the normalized absence of their kind in literature."

=== Fiction ===
In a feature, the Los Angeles Review of Books wrote about Obi-Young's short story "A Tenderer Blessing":

“Much still remains unspoken. Obi-Young relies on body language cues and the spaces between words to shape the intimacy. As readers, we feel almost as though we've been holding our breath the whole story, waiting for him to finally say it. We feel almost as though we have ourselves come out."

== Works ==
=== Short stories ===
- "A Tenderer Blessing". Transition Magazine. 2015.
- "Mulumba". The Threepenny Review. 2016.
- "You Sing of a Longing". Pride and Prejudice: African Perspectives on Gender, Social Justice and Sexuality. Jacana Media. 2017.

=== Culture writing ===
- "Chimamanda Ngozi Adichie Is in a Different Place Now", Open Country Magazine, 2021
- "How Teju Cole Opened a New Path in African Literature", Open Country Magazine, 2021
- "Cameroon's New Literary Generation Comes of Age, as Anglophone Crisis Deepens", Open Country Magazine, 2021
- "With Novels and Images, Maaza Mengiste Is Reframing Ethiopian History", Open Country Magazine, 2021
- "The Making of Ndebe, an Indigenous Script for the Igbo Language", Folio Nigeria, 2020
- "In the Age of Afrobeats, a New Sound for Highlife", Folio Nigeria, 2020
- "In Nigeria, Investigative Journalism Finds Culture Impact", Folio Nigeria, 2020

== Awards ==
- 2019: The Future Awards Africa Prize for Literature.
- 2020: The 100 Most Influential Young Nigerians, by Avance Media.
