= Cassava Republic Press =

African publishing company

- Founded: 2006; 20 years ago
- Founders: Bibi Bakare-Yusuf and Jeremy Weate
- Country of origin: Nigeria
- Distribution: Nigeria: Yellow Danfo; UK: MPP; US: Consortium Books; Ghana: Smartline; South Africa: Pan Macmillan SA
- Key people: Bibi Bakare-Yusuf
- Publication types: Books
- Imprints: Cassava Republic Press; Ankara Press
- Official website: cassavarepublic.biz/about-us

Cassava Republic Press is a steering African book publishing company established in Nigeria in 2006 and headed by Bibi Bakare-Yusuf, with a focus on affordability, the need to find and develop local talent, and to publish African writers too often celebrated only in Europe and America. Cassava Republic's stated mission is "to change the way we all think about African writing. (...) to build a new body of African writing that links writers across different times and spaces." The publishing house is considered to be "at the centre of a thriving literary scene" that has seen Nigerian writers in particular, as well as writers from elsewhere on the African continent, having considerable success both at home and internationally. ThisDay newspaper has stated of the publishing house that "it is credited with innovation. From driving down the cost of books to using digital media to drive sales, Cassava has invariably sought to redefine the African narrative."

After being based in Nigeria for a decade, Cassava Republic Press launched in London, England, in April 2016, and in 2017 launched in the US, becoming "the first African publisher to open a subsidiary outside the continent", as reported by the Financial Times.

Authors taken on by Cassava Republic who are now internationally known include Teju Cole, Elnathan John and Sarah Ladipo Manyika.

== History ==
In 2006, Bibi Bakare-Yusuf — previously an academic in the UK and Nigeria, holding a PhD in Gender Studies from the University of Warwick — set up a company, with her partner Jeremy Weate, to produce high-quality African literature at a price that would enable it to be enjoyed by as wide an audience as possible. They had no business or publishing experience, "just passion and a desire to see African stories written and owned by Africans. Inspirational figures in publishing such as Margaret Busby, co-founder of Allison & Busby, were our guide", as Bakare-Yusuf has said: "The internet, Margaret Busby, and many mistakes were my greatest teachers!" She recalls,

"When I moved to Nigeria as an academic, there were all these interesting African writers being published abroad, and they're not available locally.... So I decided, ‘okay, I'm going to start a publishing company'. Cassava Republic Press. I knew nothing, nothing nothing nothing, about publishing! I knew everything about reading and writing, but nothing about the business of publishing. 150 million people. 77 million of them young people under 30. How do we get those people reading? Those are the people I'm actually interested in converting. We want to convert minds. We want to convert them to question who they are, and also question society."

She has also said: "Visiting Nigeria and encountering the paucity and limited range of books in homes, libraries and bookstores was heart-breaking. I wondered what kind of civilization and cultural confidence could be built when so many homes are emptied of books or when the current books available rarely speak to or reflect the world the readers inhabit. I was struck deeply by this lack and decided to do something about it." Explaining the company's name, she says: "Cassava is a relatively affordable but nutritious food crop found across West Africa and in the African diaspora. I wanted a publishing house that will connect Africa to itself and its diaspora and vice versa. The idea of a Republic implies the end of a monarchy and a fresh start.... The strapline or slogan for the company is 'Feeding the African Imagination', which fits nicely with our brand name."

Bakare-Yusuf emphasises the need for Africans to be instrumental in publishing as well as writing books: "We started Cassava Republic Press because we wanted Africans to own the means of production, to be in charge of the storytelling and not just writing the stories but to own the facilities and the infrastructure for telling the stories."

Headquartered in Abuja, Nigeria, Cassava Republic has built a reputation primarily for literary fiction (with authors including winners of the Caine Prize, Commonwealth Writers' Prize and Orange Prize) but also for fiction in other genres, such as crime. In addition, the list includes books for children and young adults, and several titles have been on Nigeria's national curriculum. Among notable authors published by the company are Sarah Ladipo Manyika, Lola Shoneyin, Teju Cole, Helon Habila, Elnathan John, Adaobi Tricia Nwaubani, Mũkoma wa Ngũgĩ, Chigozie Obioma, Abubakar Adam Ibrahim, Christie Watson, John Collins, Sade Adeniran, Toni Kan, Doreen Baingana, and others.

In 2014, an associated imprint called Ankara Press was launched, with titles available in digital form as e-books, aiming to publish "a new kind of romance" that challenges conventional stereotypes, reflecting the lives and aspirations of modern African women and men: "We want scenarios that discard dangerous notions of male dominance, control and manipulation. Above all, we want writers who will allow African women to see the best version of themselves in print." Founder Bakare-Yusuf has said: "I felt that our ideas about African literature needed to be more diverse.... We don't think of African literature in terms of genre fiction. Yet, genre fiction is the mainstay of many publishing houses all over the world."

=== Expansion into the UK and US ===
In 2015 Cassava Republic Press announced plans to launch its titles in the UK in April 2016, with a presence at literary festivals as part of a partnership with the British Council. Founder Bakare-Yusuf, now based in London, has described the move as "unprecedented: an African publishing house establishing a base in the UK after nearly ten years in Africa rather than the reverse. This is the birthing of African publishing onto the world stage." Titles launched in the UK include Elnathan John's Born on a Tuesday, Sarah Ladipo Manyika's Like A Mule Bringing Ice Cream to the Sun, Leye Adenle's Easy Motion Tourist, H. J. Golakai's The Lazarus Effect and Abubakar Adam Ibrahim's Season of Crimson Blossoms.

Cassava Republic further expanded sales of its titles with a distribution deal to make the company's books directly available in US bookstores in 2017, when Bakare-Yusuf was quoted in Quartz as saying: "[London and New York] give symbolic legitimization to African writing whether we like it or not and we are acutely aware if that. But we are always saying even if they are the centers for legitimization, the means of production must be owned by Africans." She also said, as reported by Publishers Weekly: "Our aim is to show the broader reading audience that there is more to African life and literature than what you might read in the news."

In preference to the conventional route of selling publication rights to US publishers, Cassava Republic instead distributes its own editions to American booksellers through Consortium, a Minnesota-based distributor, and this represents "a significant new landmark for African literature", according to The New York Times: "Until now, much if not all of the African literature in the West has been filtered through the tastes of European and American publishers and editors, who often select works they judge to be historically significant, educational or prize worthy. Now, for the first time, an African publisher is choosing which books get exported, and as a result, Western readers are gaining access to a greater variety of titles, ranging from contemporary African romance and hard-boiled crime to epic fantasy and children's books."

Plans for Cassava Republic to launch an African-language imprint were announced by Bakare-Yusuf in November 2019.

== Awards ==
Cassava Republic Press won the Independent Publishers Guild's Alison Morrison Diversity Award in March 2018. At the London Book Fair in April 2018 Cassava Republic Press received the Inclusivity in Publishing Award, supported by The Publishers Association. In September 2020, Bakare-Yusuf won the Distinguished Africanist Award from the African Studies Association of the United Kingdom.

In October 2019, Cassava Republic Press was announced as one of five African organizations each to have been awarded a $20,000 grant from the African Publishing Innovation Fund in order to launch innovative projects that will develop literacy, book accessibility, and the use of indigenous African languages in literature.
