= Brittle Paper =

Online literary magazine

- Editor-in-Chief: Ainehi Edoro
- Categories: Literature, art, culture, interviews
- Frequency: Weekly
- Publisher: Ainehi Edoro
- First issue: August 1, 2010
- Country: United States
- Based in: Chicago
- Language: English
- Website: www.brittlepaper.com

Brittle Paper is an online literary magazine styled as an "African literary blog" published weekly in the English language. Its focus is on "build(ing) a vibrant African literary scene." It was founded by Ainehi Edoro (at the time a doctoral student from Duke University, now an assistant professor at the University of Wisconsin–Madison). Since its founding in 2010, Brittle Paper has published fiction, poetry, essays, creative nonfiction and photography from both established and upcoming African writers and artists in the continent and around the world. A member of The Guardian Books Network, it has been described as "the village square of African literature", as "Africa's leading literary journal", and as "one of Africa's most on the ball and talked-about literary publications". In 2014, the magazine was named a "Go-To Book Blog" by Publishers Weekly, who described it as "an essential source of news about new work by writers of color outside of the United States."

== Founding and features ==
Old Brittle Paper logo

According to its founding editor, the magazine began as an outlet for her postgraduate work at Duke University. The site was run out of her private finances. Edoro said: "I wanted Brittle Paper to be this place where lifestyle and literature intersected. I wanted to create a space for African literature that was chill and fun, that wasn’t preachy and had a little bit of everything for everybody. For me, Brittle Paper was about thinking about how African literature intersected with so many different spheres."

The site eventually featured news and views about contemporary African literature. Edoro describes it as "a literary project designed to adapt African literary culture to this new reality of speculative writing--fantasy, science fiction-- but also in experimental narratives, pulp-fiction, and other off-beat genres." In 2020, the Nigerian writer and journalist Otosirieze Obi-Young, who had been serving as deputy editor departed the blog.

== Evolution and place in African literary conversations ==
Brittle Paper publishes original content submitted by authors, as well as commissioned reviews, interviews, essays, and other literary work. Having grown into "a thriving community of readers and writers interested in everything about African literature", the blog is regarded as a major publicity platform for new books by African writers.

Since 2015, Brittle Paper has recognized an African Literary Person of the Year, with the inaugural award going to Nigerian sci-fi novelist Nnedi Okorafor. The 2016 award went to Zimbabwean novelist Petina Gappah, and the 2017 award to the Nigerian writer and organiser Lola Shoneyin. In 2018, the award went to the publisher Bibi Bakare-Yusuf of Cassava Republic Press.

In August 2017, the blog launched the Brittle Paper Awards. The awards are given in five categories: short prose fiction, poetry, creative nonfiction, essays/think pieces, and an Anniversary Award. It is the first literary awards in Africa to be run by a magazine and without corporate support.

In a 2017 The Afrovibe profile, novelist Obinna Udenwe notes:

While we acknowledge the rise in literary platforms since 2010, we haven’t seen one that equals Brittle Paper in style, creativity, innovation, richness of content, flexibility of the website and in giving room for whoever that is a writer to share their works and have a space to interact with the larger literary community. Brittle Paper's ideas [do] not just help build the African literary tradition, [it] sets its foundation on a solid rock and gathers all classes of people who are needed to sustain the tradition and safe-guard it.

== Censorship controversy ==
In April 2020, the deputy editor of Brittle Paper, Otosirieze Obi-Young, stopped working for the publication over an internal editorial dispute. Official statements are unclear and differ as to whether he quit or was fired. The dispute revolved around potential edits to a story about Hadiza Isma El-Rufai, a novelist and wife of Kaduna state governor Mallam Nasir El-Rufai. The governor's wife had responded to a comment calling her attention to her son's threat of sexual violence against a Twitter user during an argument on the social network, by saying: "Sow the wind, reap the whirlwind. All is fair in love and war." Hadiza El-Rufai later apologized, claiming a misunderstanding.

According to Edoro, the Brittle Paper post, written and published by Obi-Young without her vetting, contained language that was "histrionic, inflammatory, even melodramatic and totally not in keeping with the seriousness of the matter" and did not meet the site's editorial standard. She also pointed out "potentially libelous reference to two Nigerian newspapers."

These and the disagreement over how to handle the publication of the story, which was eventually taken down, led to the exit of Obi-Young, the deputy editor. In his statement, he lamented a "censorship (that) goes against everything that the platform has demonstrated in the past and that I believe it should continue to stand for.
