= Helon Habila =

Nigerian novelist and poet (born 1967)

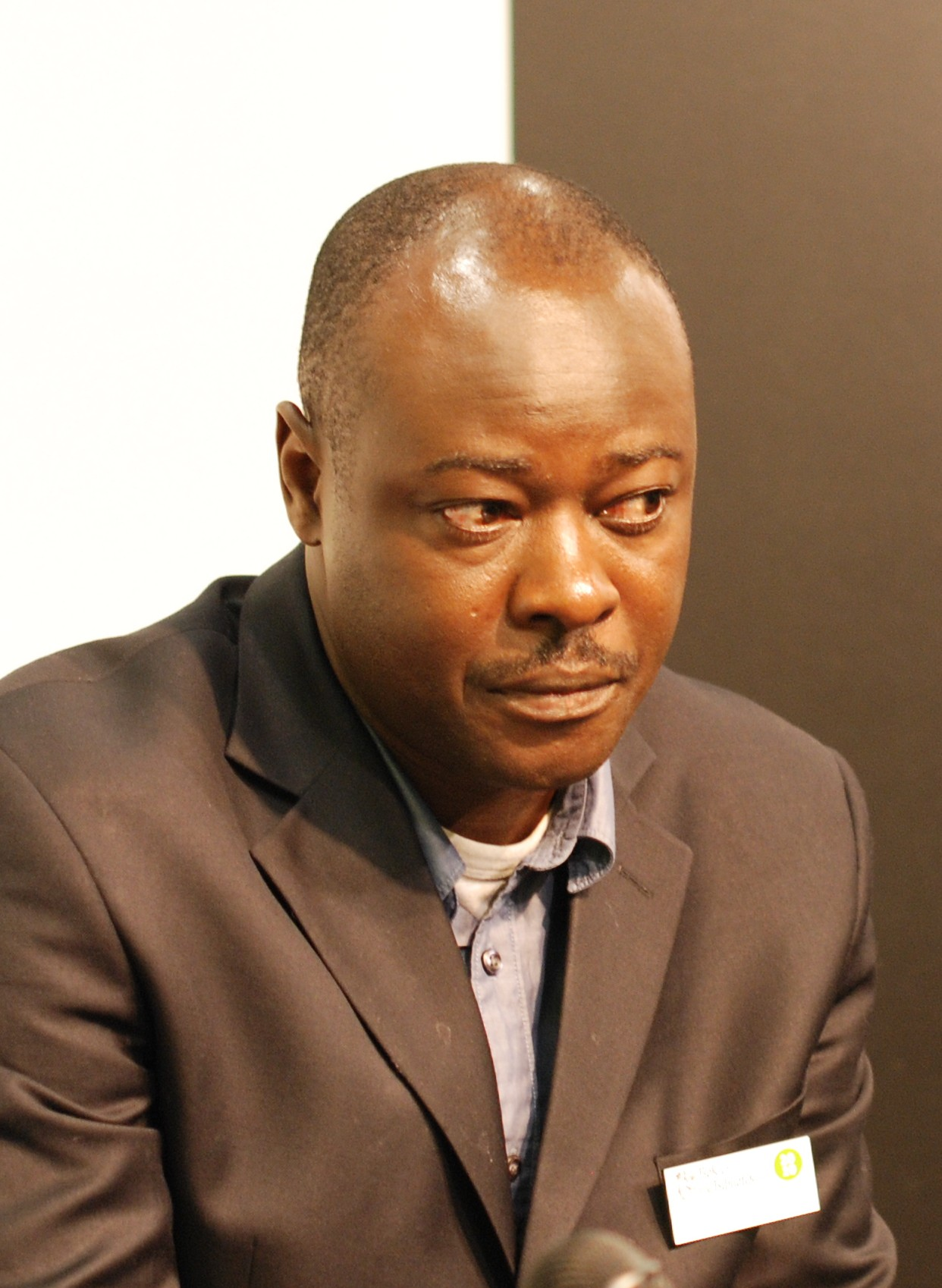
- Habila in 2009
- Born: Helon Habila Ngalabak; 1967 (age 58–59); Kaltungo, Gombe State, Nigeria
- Citizenship: Nigerian
- Education: University of Jos; University of East Anglia
- Writing career
- Notable awards: 2001 Caine Prize; 2003 Commonwealth Writers' Prize, Africa category 2015 Windham–Campbell Literature Prize
- Website: therealhelonhabila.com

Helon Habila Ngalabak (born November 1967) is a Nigerian novelist and poet, whose writing has won many prizes, including the Caine Prize in 2001. He worked as a lecturer and journalist in Nigeria before moving in 2002 to England, where he was a Chevening Scholar at the University of East Anglia, and now teaches creative writing at George Mason University, Fairfax, Virginia.

== Background ==
Helon Habila was born in Kaltungo, Gombe State, Nigeria, in 1967. He studied English Language and Literature at the University of Jos and lectured for three years at the Federal Polytechnic, Bauchi. In 1999, he went to Lagos to write for Hints magazine, moving to Vanguard newspaper as Literary Editor.

Habila won the Music Society of Nigeria national poetry award for his poem "Another Age" in 2000, the same year his short story collection Prison Stories was published. He won the 2001 Caine Prize for a story from that collection, "Love Poems". His first novel, Waiting for an Angel, was published in 2002, and the following year won the Commonwealth Writers' Prize (Africa Region, Best First Book).

Moving to England in 2002, Habila became African Writing Fellow at the University of East Anglia. In 2005 he was invited by Chinua Achebe to become the first Chinua Achebe Fellow at Bard College, NY, where he spent a year writing and teaching, remaining in the US as a professor of creative writing at George Mason University in Fairfax, Virginia.

In 2006 he co-edited the British Council anthology New Writing 14. His second novel, Measuring Time, published in 2007, was nominated for the Hurston/Wright Legacy Award, the IMPAC Prize, and in 2008 won the Virginia Library Foundation Prize for fiction. His third novel, Oil on Water (2010), which deals with environmental pollution in the oil-rich Nigerian Delta, received generally positive review coverage. Bernardine Evaristo in The Guardian wrote: "Habila's prose perfectly evokes the devastation of the oil-polluted wetlands"; Margaret Busby's review in The Independent said that "Habila has a filmic ability to etch scenes on the imagination", and Aminatta Forna in The Daily Telegraph concluded: "Habila is a skilful narrator and a master of structure." Oil on Water was shortlisted for prizes including the PEN/Open Book Award, Commonwealth Best Book, Africa Region, and the Orion Book Award. Habila's anthology The Granta Book of the African Short Story came out in September 2011.

Habila is a founding member and currently serves on the advisory board of African Writers Trust, "a non-profit entity which seeks to coordinate and bring together African writers in the Diaspora and writers on the continent to promote sharing of skills and other resources, and to foster knowledge and learning between the two groups."

From July 2013 to June 2014, Habila was a DAAD Fellow in Berlin, Germany.

He was appointed chair of the judging panel for the 2016 Etisalat Prize for Literature, alongside Elinor Sisulu and Edwige-Renée Dro.

Habila was shortlisted for the Grand Prix of Literary Associations 2019, with his work entitled Travelers.

== Early inspiration for writing ==
Growing up in a period of political dysfunction and military dictatorships, Helon Habila as a teenager in the 1980s was motivated to rebel and fight against this notion. Writing became his voice and a means of protest. It provided an avenue to express himself and his beliefs. Many times, he has tried to step away from his usual fight against injustice and write about different unrelated topics. Nevertheless, he has been unable to and stick to writing to reject injustice, oppression, and exploitation.

== Cordite publishing company ==
Cordite Books is a new publishing company jointly owned by Habila and Parrésia Publishers. Their first project was to make a call for submissions in 2013 for quality crime fiction manuscripts, the best to receive US$1,000 and a publishing deal with distribution across the continent.

In his early days, Habila grew up reading Nigerian books in Hausa and then Macmillan's Pacesetters series, which was popular pan-African fiction mostly about crime in urban areas. This resonated with the actual happenings in cities where there is always a fight for power, a struggle to be important and issues of class. This setting has been a recurring scene in his life.

With his interest in crime fiction, Helon noticed a gap in the market as many books in Nigeria at the time were either by serious literary writers, such as Chinua Achebe, or non-fiction, religious and motivational books. There was hardly any middle ground for entertainment books, and so Cordite Books decided to fill the gap for crime fiction.

== Awards and honors ==
- 2000 Music Society of Nigeria national poetry award
- 2001 Caine Prize, "Love Poems"
- 2003 Commonwealth Writers' Prize, Africa category, Waiting for an Angel
- 2007 Emily Clark Balch Prize (short story), from Virginia Quarterly Review, "The Hotel Malogo"
- 2008 Library of Virginia Literary Award for Fiction, Measuring Time
- 2011 Commonwealth Writers Prize, shortlist, Oil on Water
- 2012 Orion Book Award, shortlist, Oil on Water
- 2012 PEN/Open Book Award, shortlist, Oil on Water
- 2015 Windham–Campbell Literature Prize (Fiction) valued at $150,000
- 2019 Grand Prix of Literary Associations, shortlist, Travelers.
- 2020 James Tait Black Memorial Prize, shortlist, Travelers.

== Bibliography ==
- Prison Stories (2000), Epik Books
- Waiting for an Angel: A Novel (2004), Penguin Books. ISBN 0-14-101006-1
- New Writing 14 (2006), Granta Books (co-edited with Lavinia Greenlaw).
- Measuring Time: A Novel (2007), W. W. Norton & Company. ISBN 0-393-05251-6.
- Dreams, Miracles, and Jazz: An Anthology of New Africa Fiction (2007), Pan Macmillan (co-edited with Kadija George).
- Oil on Water: A Novel (2010), Hamish Hamilton, ISBN 978-0-241-14486-2. Published in the US (2011) by W. W. Norton & Company, ISBN 978-0-393-33964-2
- The Granta Book of the African Short Story (2011), Granta. ISBN 1-84708-247-5; ISBN 978-1-84708-247-3
- The Chibok Girls (2016), Penguin Books. ISBN 9780241980897, OCLC 960835954
- Travelers: A Novel (2019), W. W. Norton & Company. ISBN 978-0-393-23959-1
